= Jolin Tsai singles discography =

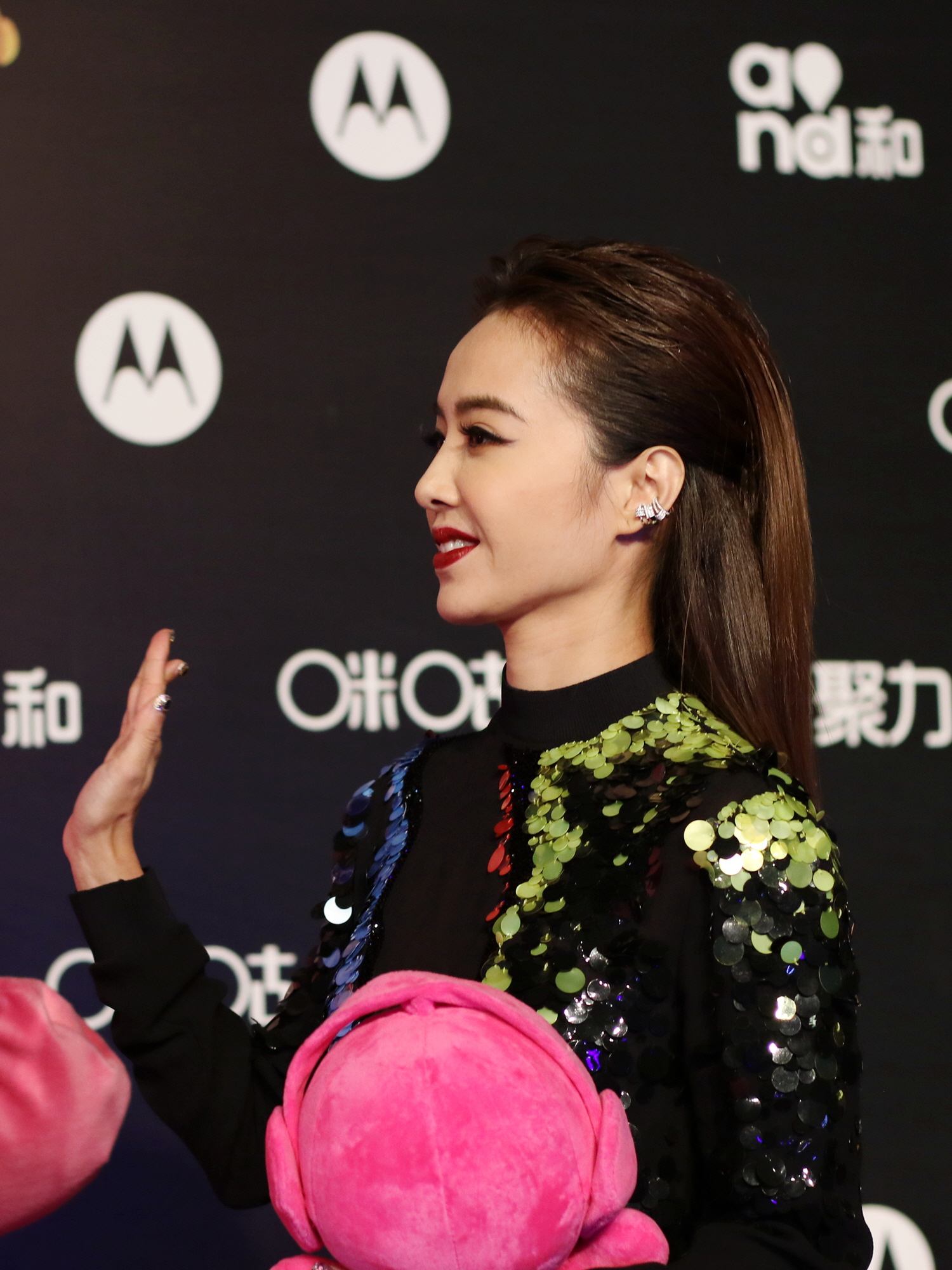
- Tsai at the 10th Migu Music Awards in Shanghai, December 2016
- Singles: 46
- Promotional singles: 9

Taiwanese singer Jolin Tsai has released a total of 46 singles and 9 promotional singles to date. In 2016, the single "Ego-Holic" reached number one on the Billboard Radio China Top 10 Chart, marking her first chart-topping entry on that list. The following year, the single "On Happiness Road" peaked at number eight on the same chart.

In 2018, Tsai debuted on the China TME UNI Chart with the single "Ugly Beauty", which reached number five. The single also topped the Billboard China Top 100 chart, becoming the first number one song in the chart's history. In 2019, the single "Happy New Year Do Re Mi" peaked at number 75 on the China Top 100 chart, while "Gravity" reached number two on the China UNI Chart.

In 2020, the single "Fight as One" reached number 15 on the China UNI Chart. The following year, "Stars Align" and "Equal in the Darkness" peaked at numbers 14 and 59, respectively, on the same chart, with "Equal in the Darkness" also reaching number 36 on the Billboard Dance/Mix Show Airplay chart. In 2022, the single "Untitled" reached number five on the Billboard Taiwan Songs chart.

In 2023, "Someday, Somewhere" and "Oh La La La" peaked at numbers 60 and 65, respectively, on the China UNI Chart. In 2025, "Pleasure" reached number two on both the Billboard Taiwan Songs chart and the China UNI Chart, while "DIY" peaked at number nine on the latter. In 2026, "Prague Square (Jolin Version)" reached number 62 on the China UNI Chart, and "Emoji" peaked at number 62 on the Billboard Philippines Hot 100 chart and number 38 on the New Zealand Top Singles chart.

== Classification criteria ==
Single-release practices differ between the Chinese-language and Western music industries.

In the Chinese-language music industry, songs from upcoming albums have traditionally often been promoted through non-commercial physical singles distributed to radio stations for airplay, usually before an album's release. After an album's release, promotion has often continued through music videos and other promotional activities, with songs described as the first, second, or subsequent promotional tracks, rather than released as additional singles. Songs may also be released as standalone singles without being included on an album. With the development of digital distribution, songs previously promoted through non-commercial physical singles have also become available on streaming services and digital download platforms. In many cases, these digital releases have continued the promotional role of their physical predecessors, even as non-commercial physical singles have become less common. Some promotional singles have also been issued by brands or companies whose products or services are endorsed by the artist, rather than by the artist's record label. These releases may take the form of physical items distributed as promotional gifts or digital releases intended to support advertising campaigns.

In the Western music industry, singles are generally more explicitly identified and documented as individual releases, and additional singles may be released after an album's release. The designation of a song as a lead, second, or subsequent single often corresponds to a distinct single release, although practices vary across artists and markets.

For the purposes of this discography, the "Singles" section lists singles released by the artist's record labels, while the "Promotional singles" section lists singles issued by other brands or companies for promotional purposes. These categories reflect the conventions adopted for this discography and are not intended to establish a universal distinction between singles and promotional singles across the music industry.

== Singles ==
=== 1990s ===
| Title | Year | Album |
|---|---|---|
| "Living with the World" | 1999 | 1019 |
| "The Rose" | 1999 | 1019 |
| "I Know You're Feeling Blue" | 1999 | 1019 |

=== 2000s ===
| Title | Year | Album |
|---|---|---|
| "Don't Stop" | 2000 | Don't Stop |
| "Show Your Love" | 2000 | Show Your Love |
| "Where the Dream Takes You" / "If Don't Want" | 2001 | Lucky Number |
| "Show Your Love / Fall in Love with a Street / You Gotta Know" (remix) | 2002 | Dance Collection |
| "The Spirit of Knight" | 2002 | Magic |
| "Magic" | 2003 | Magic |
| "Warriors in Peace" | 2003 | Warriors of Heaven and Earth: Original Motion Picture Soundtrack |
| "J-Game" | 2005 | J-Game |
| "Destined Guy" (Show Lo featuring Jolin Tsai) | 2005 | Hypnosis Show |
| "My Choice" | 2006 | J-Top |
| "Dancing Diva" | 2006 | Dancing Diva |
| "Marry Me Today" (David Tao featuring Jolin Tsai) | 2006 | Beautiful |
| "Dancing Forever" | 2006 | Dancing Forever |
| "Agent J" | 2007 | Agent J |
| "In My Arms" (Kylie Minogue featuring Jolin Tsai) | 2007 | X (Asia special edition) |
| "Real Man" (featuring Nick Chou) | 2009 | Butterfly |

=== 2010s ===
| Title | Year | Peak chart positions | | Album |
| Title | Year | CHN Billb. | CHN TME | Album |
|---|---|---|---|---|
| "Honey Trap" | 2010 | N/A | N/A | Myself |
| "Honey Trap" (Dance with Me remix) | 2010 | N/A | N/A | Myself |
| "The Great Artist" | 2012 | N/A | N/A | Muse |
| "Journey" | 2013 | N/A | N/A | Non-album single |
| "Kaleidoscope" | 2014 | N/A | N/A | Non-album single |
| "Phony Queen" | 2014 | N/A | N/A | Play |
| "Play" | 2014 | N/A | N/A | Play |
| "The Third Person and I" | 2014 | N/A | N/A | Play |
| "I Wanna Know" (Alesso featuring Jolin Tsai) | 2016 | — | N/A | Non-album single |
| "Play" (Alesso remix version) | 2016 | — | N/A | Non-album single |
| "Ego-Holic" (Starr Chen featuring Jolin Tsai) | 2016 | 1 | N/A | Welcome to the Next Level |
| "Give Love" | 2017 | — | N/A | Non-album single |
| "We Are One" (Hardwell featuring Jolin Tsai) | 2017 | — | N/A | Non-album single |
| "On Happiness Road" | 2017 | 8 | N/A | Non-album single |
| "Stand Up" | 2017 | — | N/A | Non-album single |
| "The Player" | 2018 | — | N/A | Non-album single |
| "Ugly Beauty" | 2018 | 1 | 5 | Ugly Beauty |
| "Gravity" (with Karry Wang) | 2019 | N/A | 2 | Non-album single |
"N/A" denotes releases for which the chart did not exist at the time of release. "—" denotes releases that did not chart.

=== 2020s ===
| Title | Year | Peak chart positions | | | | | Album |
| Title | Year | CHN TME | PHL | NZ Hot | TWN | US Dance Air. | Album |
|---|---|---|---|---|---|---|---|
| "Stars Align" (with R3hab) | 2021 | 14 | — | — | N/A | — | Non-album single |
| "Equal in the Darkness" (with Steve Aoki and Max) | 2021 | 59 | — | — | N/A | 36 | Non-album single |
| "Untitled" | 2022 | — | — | — | 5 | — | Non-album single |
| "Someday, Somewhere" | 2023 | 60 | — | — | — | — | Non-album single |
| "Oh La La La" | 2023 | 65 | — | — | — | — | Non-album single |
| "Pleasure" | 2025 | 2 | — | — | 2 | — | Pleasure |
| "DIY" | 2025 | 9 | — | — | — | — | Pleasure |
| "Prague Square" (Jolin version) | 2026 | 62 | — | — | — | — | Non-album single |
| "Emoji" (with SB19) | 2026 | — | 62 | 38 | — | — | Wakas at Simula |
"N/A" denotes releases for which the chart did not exist at the time of release. "—" denotes releases that did not chart.

== Promotional singles ==
| Title | Year | Peak chart positions | | Album |
| Title | Year | CHN Billb. | CHN TME | Album |
|---|---|---|---|---|
| "Where the Dream Takes You" | 2001 | N/A | N/A | Atlantis: The Lost Empire |
| "Hand in Hand" (with various artists) | 2003 | N/A | N/A | Non-album single |
| "Dare for More" (with various artists) | 2004 | N/A | N/A | Non-album single |
| "Attraction of Sexy Lips" | 2005 | N/A | N/A | Dancing Diva |
| "Pulchritude" | 2006 | N/A | N/A | Dancing Diva |
| "Heartbeat of Taiwan" | 2010 | N/A | N/A | Non-album single |
| "Sun Will Never Set" (DNF Apocalypse version) (with various artists) | 2018 | N/A | — | Non-album single |
| "Happy New Year Do Re Mi" (with Liu Yuning and various artists) | 2019 | 75 | — | Non-album single |
| "Fight as One" (with Eason Chan) | 2020 | N/A | 15 | Non-album single |
"N/A" denotes releases for which the chart did not exist at the time of release. "—" denotes releases that did not chart.

== Other charted songs ==
| Title | Year | Peak chart positions | | Album |
| Title | Year | CHN Billb. | CHN TME | Album |
|---|---|---|---|---|
| "Necessary Evil" | 2018 | — | 49 | Ugly Beauty |
| "Womxnly" | 2018 | 11 | 7 | Ugly Beauty |
| "Karma" | 2018 | 20 | 31 | Ugly Beauty |
| "Lady in Red" | 2018 | 10 | 45 | Ugly Beauty |
| "Sweet Guilty Pleasure" | 2018 | 10 | 29 | Ugly Beauty |
| "Romance" | 2018 | — | 47 | Ugly Beauty |
| "Vulnerability" | 2018 | — | 27 | Ugly Beauty |
| "Hubby" | 2018 | 11 | 21 | Ugly Beauty |
| "Life Sucks" | 2018 | 10 | 24 | Ugly Beauty |
| "Shadow Self" | 2018 | — | 50 | Ugly Beauty |
| "Layers" | 2025 | N/A | 2 | Pleasure |
| "Seven" | 2025 | N/A | 3 | Pleasure |
| "Safari" | 2025 | N/A | 19 | Pleasure |
| "Inside Out" | 2025 | N/A | 68 | Pleasure |
| "Woman's Work" | 2025 | N/A | 65 | Pleasure |
| "Pillow" | 2025 | N/A | 78 | Pleasure |
| "Good Girl" | 2025 | N/A | 53 | Pleasure |
| "Fish Love" | 2025 | N/A | 72 | Pleasure |
| "Bloody Mary" | 2025 | N/A | 76 | Pleasure |
"N/A" denotes releases for which the chart did not exist at the time of release. "—" denotes releases that did not chart.
