= Jolin Tsai albums discography =

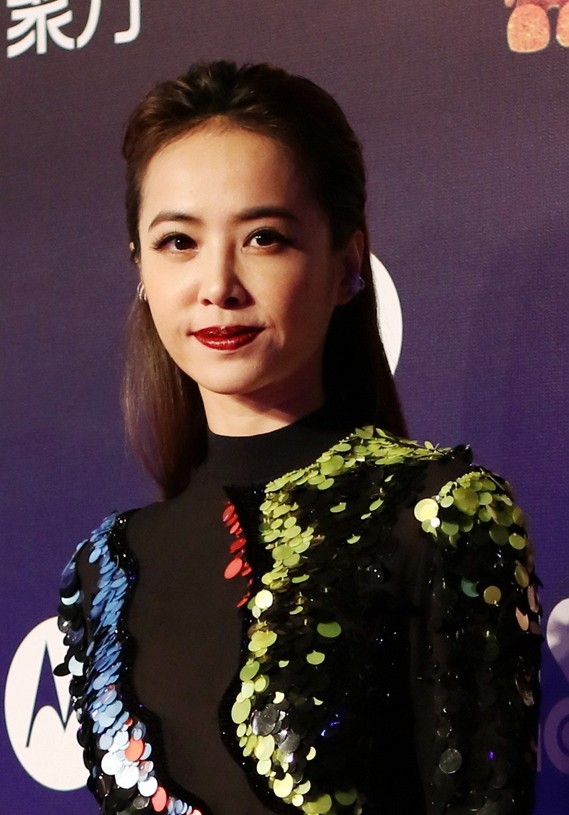
- Tsai at the 10th Migu Music Awards in Shanghai, December 2016
- Studio albums: 16
- Live albums: 5
- Compilation albums: 11

Taiwanese singer Jolin Tsai has released 16 studio albums, 5 live albums, and 11 compilation albums to date. On September 10, 1999, she released her debut studio album 1019, which sold over 450,000 copies in Taiwan. On April 26, 2000, she released her second studio album Don't Stop, which sold over 500,000 copies in Taiwan and ranked 6th in annual album sales in Taiwan. Later that year, on December 22, she released her third studio album Show Your Love, which sold over 260,000 copies in Taiwan. On July 7, 2001, she released her fourth studio album Lucky Number, which sold over 150,000 copies in Taiwan and ranked among the top 20 albums in annual sales.

On March 7, 2003, she released her fifth studio album Magic, which sold over 360,000 copies in Taiwan and 1.5 million copies across Asia, ranking second in annual album sales in Taiwan. On February 27, 2004, she released her sixth studio album Castle, which sold over 300,000 copies in Taiwan and 1.5 million copies in Asia, also ranking second in annual album sales in Taiwan. On April 25, 2005, she released her seventh studio album J-Game, which sold over 260,000 copies in Taiwan and 1.2 million copies across Asia, ranking second in annual album sales in Taiwan.

On May 12, 2006, she released her eighth studio album Dancing Diva, which sold over 300,000 copies in Taiwan and 2.5 million copies in Asia, ranking first in annual album sales in Taiwan. On September 21, 2007, she released her ninth studio album Agent J, which sold over 200,000 copies in Taiwan and 3 million copies across Asia, also ranking first in annual album sales in Taiwan. On October 31, 2008, she released her first cover album Love Exercise, which sold over 30,000 copies in Taiwan and ranked first in annual Western album sales in Taiwan.

On March 27, 2009, she released her tenth studio album Butterfly, which sold over 210,000 copies in Taiwan and 1 million copies in Asia, ranking first in annual album sales in Taiwan. On August 13, 2010, she released her eleventh studio album Myself, which sold over 65,000 copies in Taiwan, ranking fourth in annual album sales in Taiwan. On September 14, 2012, she released her twelfth studio album Muse, which sold over 95,000 copies in Taiwan and ranked third in annual album sales. On November 15, 2014, she released her thirteenth studio album Play, which sold over 85,000 copies in Taiwan and ranked third in annual album sales.

On December 26, 2018, she released her fourteenth studio album Ugly Beauty, which ranked first in annual album sales in Taiwan. On July 25, 2025, she released her fifteenth studio album Pleasure, which ranked first in annual female album sales in Taiwan.

Tsai has sold over 25 million albums, making her the highest-selling Taiwanese female artist since 2000. Starting with her 2003 album Magic, all 10 of her subsequent original studio albums have topped the annual album sales for female artists in Taiwan. Among these, four albums have also been the best-selling albums of the year overall in Taiwan.

== Albums ==
=== Studio albums ===
Title	Album details	Peak chart positions	Sales
Title	Album details	SGP	Sales
1019	Released: September 10, 1999; Label: Universal, D Sound; Formats: 2CD, 2 cassettes	—	TWN: 450,000
Don't Stop	Released: April 26, 2000; Label: Universal, D Sound; Formats: CD, cassette	—	TWN: 500,000
Show Your Love	Released: December 22, 2000; Label: Universal, D Sound; Formats: CD, cassette	—	TWN: 260,000
Lucky Number	Released: July 7, 2001; Label: Universal, D Sound; Formats: CD, cassette	—	TWN: 150,000
Magic	Released: March 7, 2003; Label: Sony; Formats: CD	1	Asia: 1,500,000; TWN: 360,000
Castle	Released: February 27, 2004; Label: Sony; Formats: CD+VCD	2	Asia: 1,500,000; TWN: 300,000
J-Game	Released: April 25, 2005; Label: Sony BMG; Formats: CD, streaming	2	Asia: 1,200,000; TWN: 260,000
Dancing Diva	Released: May 12, 2006; Label: EMI, Mars; Formats: CD, streaming	—	Asia: 2,500,000; TWN: 300,000
Agent J	Released: September 21, 2007; Label: EMI, Mars; Formats: CD, CD+DVD, streaming	—	Asia: 3,000,000; TWN: 200,000
Love Exercise	Released: October 31, 2008; Label: Gold Typhoon, Mars; Formats: CD, streaming	—	TWN: 30,000
Butterfly	Released: March 27, 2009; Label: Warner, Mars; Formats: CD, CD+DVD, streaming	—	Asia: 1,000,000; TWN: 210,000
Myself	Released: August 13, 2010; Label: Warner, Mars; Formats: CD, digital download, streaming	—	TWN: 65,000
Muse	Released: September 14, 2012; Label: Warner, Mars; Formats: CD, digital download, streaming	—	TWN: 95,000
Play	Released: November 15, 2014; Label: Warner, Eternal; Formats: CD, digital download, streaming	—	TWN: 85,000
Ugly Beauty	Released: December 26, 2018; Label: Sony, Eternal; Formats: CD, digital download, streaming	—	CHN: 950,000
Pleasure	Released: July 25, 2025 (digital); Label: Warner, Eternal; Formats: Digital download, streaming	—	CHN: 333,000

=== Compilation albums ===
Title	Album details	Sales
Together	Released: November 6, 2001; Label: Universal, D Sound; Formats: CD+VCD	—N/a
Dance Collection	Released: April 2, 2002; Label: Universal, D Sound; Formats: CD	—N/a
The Age of Innocence	Released: March 14, 2003; Label: Universal, D Sound; Formats: 2CD	—N/a
J9	Released: November 12, 2004; Label: Sony; Formats: CD	—N/a
Born to Be a Star	Released: November 12, 2004; Label: Universal, D Sound; Formats: 2CD+DVD	—N/a
J-Top	Released: May 5, 2006; Label: Sony BMG; Formats: 2CD+DVD, streaming	TWN: 100,000
Dancing Forever	Released: September 29, 2006; Label: EMI, Mars; Formats: 2CD+DVD, streaming	TWN: 60,000
Favorite	Released: November 3, 2006; Label: Sony BMG; Formats: 2CD, streaming	—N/a
Final Wonderland	Released: September 19, 2007; Label: Sony BMG; Formats: 3CD+DVD, streaming	—N/a
Jeneration	Released: February 27, 2009; Label: Gold Typhoon, Mars; Formats: 2CD, streaming	—N/a
Ultimate	Released: August 28, 2012; Label: Sony; Formats: 2CD+DVD, digital download, streaming	—N/a

=== Live albums ===
Title	Album details	Sales
J1 Live Concert	Released: September 23, 2005; Label: Sony BMG; Formats: 2CD+DVD, streaming	—N/a
If You Think You Can, You Can!	Released: June 8, 2007; Label: EMI; Formats: DVD, streaming	TWN: 120,000
Love & Live	Released: October 9, 2009; Label: Warner, Mars; Formats: CD+2DVD, streaming	—N/a
Myself World Tour	Released: October 19, 2013; Label: Warner, Mars; Formats: 2DVD, 3DVD, digital download, streaming	—N/a
Play World Tour	Released: January 30, 2018; Label: Warner, Eternal; Formats: 2DVD, BD, digital download, streaming	—N/a

== See also ==
- List of best-selling albums in Taiwan
