= The Age of Innocence (album) =

2003 greatest hits album by Jolin Tsai

Greatest hits album by Jolin Tsai
- Released: March 14, 2003
- Genre: Pop
- Length: 2:07:21
- Label: Universal; D Sound
- Producer: David Wu; Peter Lee; Paul Lee; Chen Wei

Jolin Tsai chronology
Magic (2003)	The Age of Innocence (2003)	Castle (2004)

The Age of Innocence (Chinese: 純真年代) is a greatest hits album by Taiwanese singer Jolin Tsai, released on March 14, 2003, by Universal. The album features 30 tracks from Tsai's discography during her time with Universal.

== Commercial performance ==
The album peaked at number 14 on the weekly sales chart of G-Music in Taiwan.

== Critical reception ==
Tencent Entertainment noted that this compilation album was released within seven days of Tsai's album Magic under her new label, Sony. Containing 30 tracks, it nearly encompasses the entirety of her works during her time with Universal. It was also the first compilation album issued by her former label while she was releasing new material under her new label.

== Track listing ==
The Age of Innocence – Disc 1
No.	Title	Lyrics	Music	Producer(s)	Length
1.	"Because of You"	Julian Yu	Anders Bagge; Arnthor Birgisson; Christian Karlsson; Patrick Tucker	Peter Lee	4:40
2.	"I Know You're Feeling Blue"	Kiki Hu	Jimmy Ye	David Wu	4:24
3.	"The Rose"	Amanda McBroom	Amanda McBroom	David Wu	4:20
4.	"Living with the World"	Chuang Ching-wen	Ronald Ng	Peter Lee; Paul Lee	3:56
5.	"Out on the Street"	Mao Mao	Jun Young-hun	David Wu	3:49
6.	"Blame It on the Age"	Eric Lin	Michael Tu	David Wu	4:44
7.	"Good-Bye"	Mao Mao; Joe Lai	Keith Chan	David Wu	4:46
8.	"Emptiness"	Chuang Ching-wen	Chervun Liew	Peter Lee	3:52
9.	"Don't Stop"	Mao Mao	Rachel Stevens; Hannah Spearritt; Bradley McIntosh; Jon Lee; Paul Cattermole; Jo O'Meara; Tina Barrett; Eliot Kennedy; Mike Percy; Tim Lever	Paul Lee	3:34
10.	"Are You Happy"	Kiki Hu	Michael Tu	David Wu	4:36
11.	"You Gotta Know"	Lu Hsueh-han	Chen Wei	Chen Wei	4:00
12.	"What Kind of Love"	Jerry Huang	Jimmy Ye	Peter Lee	4:01
13.	"Words of Loneliness"	Wu Yu-kang	Kuo Heng-chi	David Wu	4:56
14.	"Sugar Sugar"	Andy Kim	Jeff Barry	David Wu	3:50
15.	"Eternity"	Chuang Ching-wen	Peter Lee	Peter Lee	4:19
Total length:					63:47

The Age of Innocence – Disc 2
No.	Title	Lyrics	Music	Producer(s)	Length
1.	"Show Your Love"	Benny Chen	Paul Lee	Paul Lee	4:18
2.	"Do You Still Love Me"	Kiki Hu	Azlan Abu Hassan	David Wu	4:23
3.	"Love Is Near"	Adam Hsu	Chen Wei	Chen Wei	3:15
4.	"Fall in Love with a Street"	Hsieh Meng-chuan	Nobuhiro Makino	David Wu	4:24
5.	"Feel Your Presence"	Julian Yu	Chervun Liew	Paul Lee	4:05
6.	"Reluctant"	Hsieh Meng-chuan	Jimmy Ye	David Wu	4:59
7.	"If You Said Love Me on That Day"	Sandee Chan	Sandee Chan	Peter Lee	4:08
8.	"Lucky Number"	Hsieh Meng-chuan	Paul Lee	Paul Lee	4:18
9.	"If You Don't Want"	Hsieh Meng-chuan	Low Shao Ying; Chervun Liew	Peter Lee; Paul Lee	4:12
10.	"Can't Speak Clearly"	Mao Mao	Jay Chou	Peter Lee	5:05
11.	"Take It Easy"	Julian Yu; Mao Mao	Chen Chih-yuan	David Wu	3:52
12.	"Watch Me Closely"	Julian Yu	Chen Wei	Chen Wei	3:40
13.	"Catcher"	Adam Hsu	Peter Lee	Peter Lee	3:55
14.	"Bridge over Troubled Water"	Paul Simon	Paul Simon	David Wu	4:36
15.	"Only One of You"	Yao Chien	Azlan Abu Hassan	Peter Lee	4:24
Total length:					63:34

== Release history ==
Region	Date	Format	Distributor
Taiwan	March 27, 2003	2CD	Universal
