= Together (Jolin Tsai album) =

2001 greatest hits album by Jolin Tsai

Greatest hits album by Jolin Tsai
- Released: November 6, 2001
- Genre: Pop
- Length: 2:14:19
- Label: Universal; D Sound
- Producer: David Wu; Paul Lee; Peter Lee; Chen Wei

Jolin Tsai chronology
Lucky Number (2001)	Together (2001)	Dance Collection (2002)

Together is a greatest hits album by Taiwanese singer Jolin Tsai, released on November 6, 2001, by Universal. The album features 16 songs from her time with Universal, 14 music videos, and behind-the-scenes footage from the making of her album Lucky Number (2001).

== Critical reception ==
Tencent Entertainment noted that Together was Tsai's first greatest hits compilation, featuring 16 of her most iconic singles released during her time with Universal. The album was released amid her contract dispute with her management company, which heightened interest in the collection. The inclusion of 14 music videos added significant appeal at the time of its release.

== Track listing ==
Together – CD
No.	Title	Lyrics	Music	Producer(s)	Length
1.	"I Know You're Feeling Blue"	Kiki Hu	Jimmy Ye	David Wu	4:24
2.	"Don't Stop"	Mao Mao	Rachel Stevens; Hannah Spearritt; Bradley McIntosh; Jon Lee; Paul Cattermole; Jo O'Meara; Tina Barrett; Eliot Kennedy; Mike Percy; Tim Lever	Paul Lee	3:34
3.	"Show Your Love"	Benny Chen	Paul Lee	Paul Lee	4:18
4.	"If You Don't Want"	Hsieh Meng-chuan	Low Shao Ying; Chervun Liew	Peter Lee; Paul Lee	4:12
5.	"Are You Happy"	Kiki Hu	Michael Tu	David Wu	4:36
6.	"Living with the World"	Chuang Ching-wen	Ronald Ng	Peter Lee; Paul Lee	3:56
7.	"Lucky Number"	Hsieh Meng-chuan	Paul Lee	Paul Lee	4:18
8.	"Fall in Love with a Street"	Hsieh Meng-chuan	Nobuhiro Makino	David Wu	4:24
9.	"Do You Still Love Me"	Kiki Hu	Azlan Abu Hassan	David Wu	4:23
10.	"What Kind of Love"	Jerry Huang	Jimmy Ye	Peter Lee	4:01
11.	"Because of You"	Julian Yu	Anders Bagge; Arnthor Birgisson; Christian Karlsson; Patrick Tucker	Peter Lee	4:40
12.	"Take It Easy"	Julian Yu; Mao Mao	Chen Chih-yuan	David Wu	3:52
13.	"Reluctant"	Hsieh Meng-chuan	Jimmy Ye	David Wu	4:59
14.	"You Gotta Know"	Lu Hsueh-han	Chen Wei	Chen Wei	4:00
15.	"Words of Loneliness"	Wu Yu-kang	Kuo Heng-chi	David Wu	4:56
16.	"Good-Bye"	Mao Mao; Joe Lai	Keith Chan	David Wu	4:46
Total length:					69:19

Together – VCD
No.	Title	Length
1.	"Lucky Number Behind-the-Scenes"	2:54
2.	"If You Don't Want" (music video)	4:21
3.	"Lucky Number" (music video)	4:25
4.	"Can't Speak Clearly" (music video)	5:02
5.	"Take It Easy" (music video)	3:52
6.	"Show Your Love" (music video)	4:19
7.	"Do You Still Love Me" (music video)	4:25
8.	"Fall in Love with a Street" (music video)	4:24
9.	"Reluctant" (music video)	4:59
10.	"Are You Happy" (music video)	4:36
11.	"What Kind of Love" (music video)	3:59
12.	"You Gotta Know" (music video)	4:00
13.	"I Know You're Feeling Blue" (music video)	5:10
14.	"Living with the World" (music video)	3:53
15.	"Good-Bye" (music video)	4:41
Total length:		65:00

Together – Chinese edition (CD)
No.	Title	Lyrics	Music	Producer(s)	Length
1.	"I Know You're Feeling Blue"	Kiki Hu	Jimmy Ye	David Wu	4:22
2.	"Don't Stop"	Mao Mao	Rachel Stevens; Hannah Spearritt; Bradley McIntosh; Jon Lee; Paul Cattermole; Jo O'Meara; Tina Barrett; Eliot Kennedy; Mike Percy; Tim Lever	Paul Lee	3:32
3.	"Are You Happy"	Kiki Hu	Michael Tu	David Wu	4:35
4.	"Lucky Number"	Hsieh Meng-chuan	Paul Lee	Paul Lee	4:17
5.	"Fall in Love with a Street"	Hsieh Meng-chuan	Nobuhiro Makino	David Wu	4:22
6.	"Do You Still Love Me"	Kiki Hu	Azlan Abu Hassan	David Wu	4:20
7.	"What Kind of Love"	Jerry Huang	Jimmy Ye	Peter Lee	3:58
8.	"Because of You"	Julian Yu	Anders Bagge; Arnthor Birgisson; Christian Karlsson; Patrick Tucker	Peter Lee	4:39
9.	"Take It Easy"	Julian Yu; Mao Mao	Chen Chih-yuan	David Wu	3:50
10.	"You Gotta Know"	Lu Hsueh-han	Chen Wei	Chen Wei	3:57
11.	"Can't Speak Clearly"	Mao Mao	Jay Chou	Peter Lee	5:04
12.	"Good-Bye"	Mao Mao; Joe Lai	Keith Chan	David Wu	4:45
Total length:					51:41

== Release history ==
Region	Date	Format(s)	Distributor
China	November 6, 2001	CD; cassette	Push
Malaysia	November 6, 2001	CD+VCD; cassette	Universal
Taiwan	November 6, 2001	CD+VCD; cassette	Universal
