= Ultimate (Jolin Tsai album) =

2012 greatest hits album by Jolin Tsai

Greatest hits album by Jolin Tsai
- Released: August 28, 2012
- Genre: Pop
- Length: 2:54:29
- Label: Sony
- Producer: Jamie Hsueh; Bing Wang; Jay Chou; David Wu; Huang Yi; Jack Chou; Peter Lee; Paul Lee; G-Power; Adia

Jolin Tsai chronology
Myself (2010)	Ultimate (2012)	Muse (2012)

Ultimate (Chinese: J女神) is a greatest hits album by Taiwanese singer Jolin Tsai, released by Sony on August 28, 2012. The album features 30 songs and 10 music videos from Tsai's time with Sony and Universal.

== Commercial performance ==
The album reached a peak position of number 14 on Taiwan's Five Music weekly sales chart.

== Track listing ==
Ultimate – CD 1
No.	Title	Lyrics	Music	Producer(s)	Length
1.	"Signature Gesture"	Issac Chen	Edward Chan; Charles Lee	Jamie Hsueh	3:12
2.	"Magic"	Issac Chen	Edward Chan; Charles Lee	Bing Wang	3:46
3.	"J-Game"	Issac Chen	Jonas Nordelius; Andreas Levander; Awa Manneh	Bing Wang	3:51
4.	"36 Tricks of Love"	Kiki Hu	Savan Kotecha; Andrew Frampton; Wayne Wilkins	Bing Wang	3:34
5.	"Prove It"	Kevin Yi	George Samuelson; Michael Lundh; Quint Starkie; Allan Rich	Huang Yi	3:39
6.	"Oh Oh"	Issac Chen	Jonas Nordelius; Andreas Levander; Jeanette Olsson	Jack Chou	3:09
7.	"Overlooking Purposely"	Sunny Lee; Francis Lee	Mads Hauge; Vincent DeGiorgio	Jamie Hsueh	2:59
8.	"Smell of the Popcorn"	Vincent Fang	Wan Chiu	Bing Wang	4:20
9.	"Pirates"	Issac Chen	Jay Chou	Jay Chou	4:35
10.	"The Spirit of Knight"	Jolin Tsai	Jay Chou	Jay Chou	4:17
11.	"Prague Square"	Vincent Fang	Jay Chou	Jay Chou	4:54
12.	"Greek Girl by the Wishing Pond"	Alang Huang	Ivana Wong	Jamie Hsueh	3:10
13.	"Love Love Love"	Simon Liang	Konstantin Meladze	Huang Yi	3:48
14.	"Exclusive Myth"	Issac Chen	Wang Leehom	Jack Chou	4:10
15.	"Show Your Love"	Benny Chen	Paul Lee	Paul Lee	4:18
Total length:					57:42

Ultimate – CD 2
No.	Title	Lyrics	Music	Producer(s)	Length
1.	"Rewind"	Vincent Fang	Jay Chou	G-Power	4:25
2.	"Sky"	Wesley Chia; Kiki Hu	Wesley Chia	Adia	4:38
3.	"Be You for a Day"	Francis Lee	Jamie Hsueh	Jamie Hsueh	4:43
4.	"The Smell of Lemon Grass"	Francis Lee	Peter Lee	Peter Lee	4:32
5.	"The Starter"	Jolin Tsai	Jamie Hsueh	Jamie Hsueh	4:36
6.	"Repeated Note"	Jolin Tsai	Jamie Hsueh	Jamie Hsueh	4:24
7.	"Sweet and Sour"	Francis Lee	Jamie Hsueh	Jamie Hsueh	4:29
8.	"Say Love You"	Simon Liang	Jay Chou	Bing Wang	3:46
9.	"It's Love"	Simon Liang	Jay Chou	Bing Wang	4:16
10.	"Missing You"	Francis Lee	Lin Song-chin	Jamie Hsueh	3:55
11.	"Single Harm"	Francis Lee	Kang Hyun-min	Jamie Hsueh	3:44
12.	"What Kind of Love"	Jerry Huang	Jimmy Ye	Peter Lee	4:01
13.	"Blame It on the Age"	Eric Lin	Michael Tu	David Wu	4:44
14.	"Can't Speak Clearly"	Mao Mao	Jay Chou	David Wu	5:05
15.	"I Know You're Feeling Blue"	Kiki Hu	Jimmy Ye	David Wu	4:24
Total length:					65:42

Ultimate – DVD
No.	Title	Length
1.	"Magic" (music video)	3:45
2.	"J-Game" (music video)	4:04
3.	"The Spirit of Knight" (music video)	4:19
4.	"Prague Square" (music video)	4:53
5.	"Greek Girl by the Wishing Pond" (music video)	3:24
6.	"Say Love You" (music video)	3:49
7.	"Sky" (music video)	5:47
8.	"My Choice" (music video)	4:40
9.	"Rewind" (music video)	4:25
10.	"The Spirit of Knight" / "Pirates" / "Magic" (live video)	11:59
Total length:		51:05

== Release history ==
Region	Date	Format(s)	Distributor
Various	August 28, 2012	Streaming; digital download	Sony
China	August 28, 2012	2CD+DVD	Epic
Malaysia	August 28, 2012	2CD+DVD	Sony
Taiwan	August 28, 2012	2CD+DVD	Sony
