= Lucky Number (album) =

2001 studio album by Jolin Tsai

- Deluxe edition cover

Studio album by Jolin Tsai
- Released: July 7, 2001
- Genre: Pop
- Length: 41:16
- Labels: Universal; D Sound
- Producers: David Wu; Peter Lee; Paul Lee; Chen Wei; Kay Huang

Jolin Tsai chronology
Show Your Love (2000)	Lucky Number (2001)	Together (2001)

Singles from Lucky Number
- 1. "Where the Dream Takes You / If Don't Want" Released: June 28, 2001

Lucky Number is the fourth studio album by Taiwanese singer Jolin Tsai, released on July 7, 2001, by Universal. The album was produced by David Wu, Peter Lee, Paul Lee, Chen Wei, and Kay Huang, blending elements of pop, R&B, disco, and hip-hop.

Due to contractual disputes between Tsai and her management company, D Sound, promotional activities for the album were limited. Nevertheless, it sold over 150,000 copies in Taiwan and ranked among the top 20 best-selling albums in the region in 2001.

== Background and development ==
On June 19, 2001, media reported that Tsai would perform the Mandarin version of the theme song "Where the Dream Takes You" for Disney's animated film Atlantis: The Lost Empire, making her the third artist—following Coco Lee and Jacky Cheung—to sing a Chinese theme song for a Disney film.

On June 21, 2001, it was reported that her upcoming album was scheduled for release on July 13, with pre-orders set to begin on July 28. A concert featuring her new songs was expected to be held in mid-July. The media also noted that Jay Chou had written a new track for the album titled "Can't Speak Clearly". On June 30, Tsai held the debut performance of Mandarin version of "Where the Dream Takes You" in Taipei.

On July 3, 2001, media revealed that her overseas affairs would be managed by the manager behind pop divas Faye Wong and Na Ying, with plans underway for a concert tour by the end of the year. The next day, reports confirmed the album release had been moved up to July 7. Universal stated that pre-orders had exceeded expectations, reaching approximately 28,000 copies. Since the pre-order bonus included tickets to her concert at Nankang 101, which had a capacity of only 7,000, the album release was advanced to avoid potential disputes.

== Writing and recording ==
"If Don't Want" is a slightly melancholic ballad that explores themes of sincerity, persistence, and tolerance in love. Tsai described the song as "undoubtedly tailor-made for me". "Lucky Number" is an upbeat track with a strong rhythm. Producer Paul Lee revealed that the song was inspired by Tsai's commanding stage presence, saying, "You can picture her sharp and carefree dance moves the moment you hear it."

"Can't Speak Clearly" portrays a girl's inner struggle between two romantic relationships. Tsai originally penned the lyrics under the title "Dialogue", drawing inspiration from her classmates' love stories. However, lyricist Hsieh Meng-chuan felt the content was too whimsical, and it was ultimately not used. "Bridge over Troubled Water" is a cover of Simon & Garfunkel's classic. The arrangement blends gospel and R&B elements, with Tsai delivering a richer vocal tone to express themes of friendship and unwavering support.

== Title and artwork ==
Tsai's debut album 1019 laid the foundation for her popularity, leading her to believe that numbers carry a symbolic power to bring good fortune. Inspired by this belief, she named her fourth studio album Lucky Number.

The album cover features a fresh makeup look and a minimalist style. Tsai wears a black off-shoulder tank top, paired with a mature and alluring gaze that conveys both sensuality and growth. The album was released in two editions: the standard edition, which includes four photo cards, and the deluxe edition, which comes with two photobooks. The photo shoot cost NT$1.5 million and was conducted across ten everyday locations—including a swimming pool, library, record store, supermarket, campus, and stage—culminating in a curated selection from over 3,000 photos.

== Release and promotion ==
On June 28, 2001, Tsai held an album pre-order event at Hanshin Department Store in Kaohsiung, Taiwan. The original 20,000 limited-edition pre-order gifts were later increased by an additional 8,000 sets. These gifts included two songs: "Where the Dream Takes You" and "Bridge over Troubled Water". On July 3, 2001, Tsai hosted a press conference in Taipei to celebrate the album's pre-order success. It was announced that over 28,000 copies had been pre-ordered in Taiwan within just 50 hours of launch, prompting the album's release to be moved up to July 7. On July 21, Tsai held the Lucky Number Concert at Nankang 101 in Taipei, drawing a crowd of over 6,000 attendees. On March 21, 2002, Universal released the video compilation Lucky Number Karaoke. The album includes nine music videos, along with six television commercial clips featuring Tsai for Mobitai Communications.

=== Music videos ===
The music video for "If Don't Want" was directed by Chin Cho and features a performance by Ryan Kuo. The video for "Lucky Number" was directed by Milo Hsu, while "Bridge over Troubled Water" was directed by Marlboro Lai. The music videos for "Can't Speak Clearly", "Watch Me Closely", and "Catcher" were all directed by Px3.

=== Live performances ===
On July 29, 2001, Tsai performed "Take It Easy" at the closing gala of the 30 Hour Famine event, organized by Formosa TV. On August 12, she took part in the High Sense Concert hosted by GTV, where she performed "Take It Easy" and "Can't Speak Clearly". On August 19, 2001, Tsai appeared at MTV Mandarin's Summer Music Summit, where she delivered a seven-song set that included "Lucky Number", "Watch Me Closely", "Can't Speak Clearly", "Let Me Alone", "If Don't Want", "Bridge over Troubled Water", and "Take It Easy".

On October 10, 2001, she performed "Take It Easy" and "Can't Speak Clearly" at CTS's National Day Concert. On December 24, 2001, she joined MTV Mandarin's Christmas Party, performing "Can't Speak Clearly" and "If Don't Want". On December 31, 2001, Tsai performed "Lucky Number" at two New Year's Eve concerts hosted by TVBS-G and GTV, pairing it with "Bridge over Troubled Water" and "Can't Speak Clearly", respectively. On January 25, 2002, she performed "Lucky Number" at the 8th China Music Awards Ceremony.

=== Contractual dispute ===
In early July 2001, Tsai's father, Tsai Chu-chen, sent legal notices to several companies that had previously collaborated with Tsai, expressing dissatisfaction with her management company, D Sound. He claimed that the company did not hold legitimate managerial rights and had underpaid Tsai for her work. In response, D Sound issued a counter legal notice accusing Tsai of defamation.

Shortly after, Tsai Chu-chen decided to suspend his daughter's entertainment activities starting August 20, 2001. On August 15, 2001, Tsai held a press conference accompanied by her lawyer, announcing the unilateral termination of her contract with D Sound. In response, the company held its own press conference, accusing Tsai of breaching the contract and demanding a public apology along with NT$10 million in damages. Tsai Chu-chen alleged that in July 2000, D Sound had pressured Tsai and her mother into signing a letter of authorization without his knowledge, granting full cooperation rights with Warner to D Sound following the conclusion of her recording contract with Universal. Although the letter was later withdrawn, it was re-signed under the arrangement of Sam Chen, who had left Universal to join Warner. Chen stated that the document was merely a letter of intent and asserted that Warner would no longer work with Tsai, reserving the right to pursue legal action. David Wu also issued an open letter to Tsai and her family through the media, stating that he would refrain from filing a lawsuit for the time being.

In November 2001, Tsai signed a contract with Comic Ritz, which led D Sound to file a criminal lawsuit against her. On December 4, 2001, the Taipei District Prosecutors Office opened an investigation. D Sound accused Tsai of defamation and sought NT$27 million in damages, while Tsai countersued for misappropriation of funds. Both parties then initiated arbitration proceedings and legal action over the contract dispute. Meanwhile, Tsai Chu-chen filed for a provisional injunction, which was granted, preventing D Sound from obstructing Tsai's entertainment activities before the arbitration ruling. On January 29, 2002, D Sound accused Tsai of infringing on their sound recording copyrights during two year-end performances and released her income statements to the public. A second round of arbitration was held on January 31.

On June 4, 2002, the Chinese Arbitration Association Taipei ruled that the seven-year contract between Tsai and D Sound had been terminated after only two years, and Tsai was ordered to pay NT$9 million in compensation. D Sound responded by stating that the ruling proved their accusations were unfounded and considered withdrawing the criminal defamation lawsuit, though they would continue pursuing claims related to copyright infringement. In response, Tsai Chu-chen emphasized that the arbitration confirmed their right to terminate the contract and revealed that D Sound had indeed breached the agreement and exhibited financial irregularities.

== Commercial performance ==
The album ranked among the top 20 best-selling records in Taiwan in 2001. It also placed number 19 and number 20 on the annual sales charts of Rose Records and Tachung Records, respectively.

== Critical reception ==
Tencent Entertainment reviewed Lucky Number as Tsai's most outstanding work during her time with Universal. The review highlighted her increasingly refined approach to R&B and hip-hop styles, noting that the inclusion of disco and rap elements enhanced the album's overall listening experience and replay value. As her final album with Universal, it was seen as matching the production quality of Show Your Love. The album was praised for encompassing the wide range of musical styles Tsai explored during her Universal era—including ballads, cheerful tunes, melancholic tracks, and rhythm-driven songs—serving as a comprehensive summary of her artistic evolution during that period. The review also pointed out that Tsai's upbeat tracks had begun to establish a more consistent style. Although she still maintained a youthful image, it did not detract from the quality of the music. Significantly, this album marked her first collaboration with female producers Kay Huang and Paula Ma, breaking her previous pattern of working exclusively with male producers. However, the contract dispute that emerged during the album's release cycle affected its promotional efforts, ultimately resulting in sales that fell short of expectations. As a result, Lucky Number became her lowest-selling album during her tenure at Universal.

== Accolades ==
On January 25, 2002, the song "Lucky Number" won the Most Popular Song award at the 8th China Music Awards.

== Track listing ==
No.	Title	Lyrics	Music	Producer(s)	Length
1.	"Bridge over Troubled Water"	Paul Simon	Paul Simon	David Wu	4:36
2.	"Watch Me Closely" (看緊我)	Julian Yu	Chen Wei	Chen Wei	3:40
3.	"Lucky Number"	Hsieh Meng-chuan	Paul Lee	Paul Lee	4:18
4.	"If Don't Want" (如果不想要)	Hsieh Meng-chuan	Low Shao Ying; Chervun Liew	Peter Lee; Paul Lee	4:12
5.	"Catcher" (捕手)	Adam Hsu	Peter Lee	Peter Lee	3:55
6.	"Take It Easy"	Julian Yu; Mao Mao	Chen Chih-yuan	David Wu	3:52
7.	"Only One of You" (只有一個你)	Yao Chien	Azlan Abu Hassan	Peter Lee	4:24
8.	"Can't Speak Clearly" (你怎麼連話都說不清楚)	Mao Mao	Jay Chou	Peter Lee	5:05
9.	"Surprise"	Mao Mao	Jae Chong	David Wu	3:09
10.	"By Me" (由我)	Hsieh Tien-yao	Hsieh Tien-yao	Kay Huang	4:05
Total length:					41:16

Lucky Number – Malaysian limited edition (VCD)
No.	Title	Length
1.	"Lucky Number" (music video)	4:25
2.	"If Don't Want" (music video)	4:21
Total length:		8:46

== Release history ==
Region	Date	Format(s)	Edition(s)	Distributor
China	July 7, 2001	CD; cassette	Standard	Push
Indonesia	July 7, 2001	Cassette	Standard	Universal
Malaysia	July 7, 2001	CD; cassette	Standard	Universal
Malaysia	July 7, 2001	CD+VCD	Limited	Universal
Taiwan	July 7, 2001	CD; cassette	Standard; deluxe	Universal
