= Show Your Love =

2000 studio album by Jolin Tsai

- Standard edition cover

Studio album by Jolin Tsai
- Released: December 22, 2000
- Genre: Pop
- Length: 40:45
- Label: Universal; D Sound
- Producer: David Wu; Paul Lee; Peter Lee; Chen Wei; Jae Chong

Jolin Tsai chronology
Don't Stop (2000)	Show Your Love (2000)	Lucky Number (2001)

Singles from Show Your Love
- 1. "Show Your Love" Released: December 13, 2000

Show Your Love is the third studio album by Taiwanese singer Jolin Tsai, released on December 22, 2000, by Universal. The production team included David Wu, Peter Lee, Paul Lee, Chen Wei, and Jae Chong. The album sold over 260,000 copies in Taiwan. The music video for the song "Fall in Love with a Street" won the MTV Video Music Award for International Viewer's Choice.

== Background and development ==
On July 11, 2000, Tsai traveled to the Juilliard School in New York to participate in a one-month vocal training course led by vocal coaches Don Lawrence and BeV. By November 24, 2000, media reports confirmed that Tsai had completed recording her new album, which she described as feeling like finishing the final exam of a university entrance test, bringing a sense of relief. Subsequently, on December 7, the media revealed that her new album was scheduled for release on December 22.

== Writing and recording ==
The lead single, "Show Your Love", is a high-energy party dance track. During the recording process, producer Paul Lee led Tsai and the sound engineers to dance together in the studio, allowing her to sing while moving. To create an authentic party atmosphere, eight African-American backing vocalists from New York were specially invited to enrich the song’s layers with their harmonies. "Do You Still Love Me" is a heartfelt ballad expressing a woman’s delicate hopes for love alongside her fears of getting hurt.

Tsai spent her summer studying vocal music at the Juilliard School in New York. Inspired by the streets of New York, "Fall in Love with a Street" conveys a woman’s longing and anticipation for love. "Reluctant" features a graceful melody that portrays the emotions within a woman's heart. "Feel Your Presence" reflects Tsai’s transition from adolescence to adulthood, capturing her evolving expectations and emotional changes regarding love.

== Release and promotion ==
The first edition of the album included ten tracks along with the documentary short Jolin's True Life. On February 9, 2001, Universal released a revised edition of the album. Later, on February 25, 2001, Tsai held her first Show Your Love Concert in Panchiao. The second concert took place on March 4 in Taichung. On March 16, 2001, the label released another revised edition, which featured two additional music videos and three live performance videos from the Show Your Love concert. On August 13, 2001, Universal released the video compilation Show Your Love Karaoke. The album includes ten music videos, as well as five television commercial clips featuring Tsai for the brand Tsaio.

=== Single and music videos ===
On December 12, 2000, the music video for the song "Show Your Love" was released across several websites, including Kimo, Yahoo, PChome, Yam, and Sina. It was also broadcast in City Chain's 70 stores across Taiwan, on a 100-inch LED screen truck in northern Taiwan, in Mobitai's 10 stores in central Taiwan, and on the outdoor screen of the Hanshin Department Store in Kaohsiung. Directed by Tony Lin, the video featured 14 dancers and included scenes of Tsai performing aerial dance on wires, creating a lively party atmosphere with an upbeat, dynamic feel. The single "Show Your Love" was officially released the following day, on December 13.

The music video for the song "Do You Still Love Me" was filmed on a remote grassland and directed by Kuang Sheng, with actor Ming Dao invited to star. The video emphasizes a sense of vast open space. The song was ranked number 30 on Hit FM Top 100 Singles of 2001.

The music video for "Fall in Love with a Street" was directed by Ma I-chung and inspired by Tsai's experience studying abroad in New York City. It captures joyful dance practice scenes juxtaposed with the loneliness of homesickness. Tsai expressed that living in a foreign country deepened her appreciation for the warmth of home. Ma I-chung also directed the music videos for the songs "Reluctant" and "Feel Your Presence".

=== Live performances ===
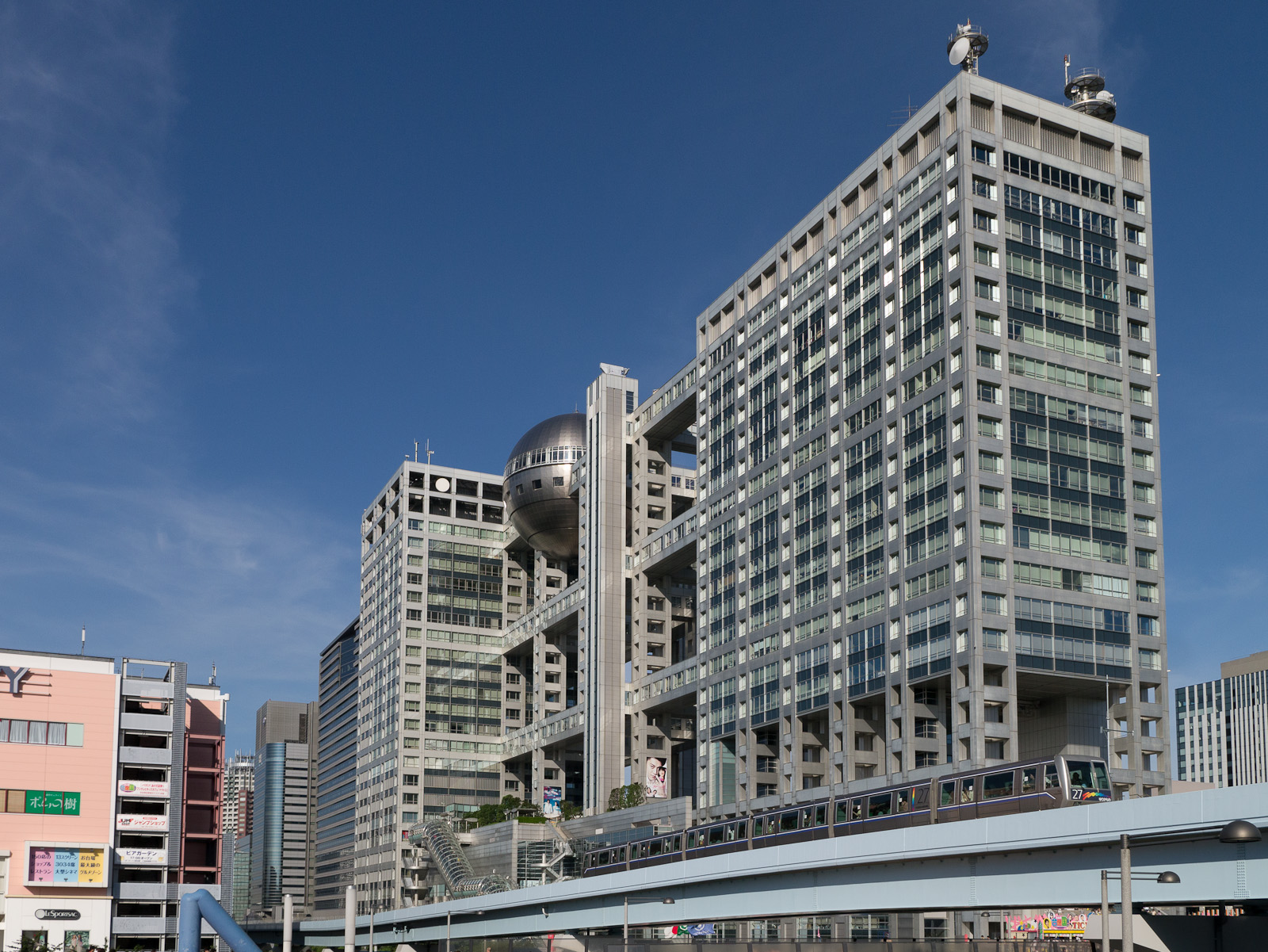
Tsai traveled to the Fuji TV studio in Tokyo, Japan, to record an episode of the variety show Asia Super Live, where she performed "Show Your Love".

On December 31, 2000, Tsai performed at the New Year's Eve Concert hosted by CTS, where she sang "Show Your Love", "Reluctant", "Fall in Love with a Street", "Baby Face", and "Do You Still Love Me". On March 22, 2001, she recorded an appearance on the Japanese Fuji TV variety show Asia Super Live, where she performed "Show Your Love"; the episode aired on March 27. Later that year, on June 9, Tsai took part in a concert held by MTV Mandarin in Taipei, performing "Show Your Love" and "Surprise".

== Commercial performance ==
In 2001, the album ranked number 11 on Rose Records' annual album sales chart in Taiwan.

== Critical reception ==
Southern Metropolis Daily praised the album for clearly establishing Tsai's personal style, noting that her focused and sincere emotions shine through in every song. The review highlighted how listeners could feel her youthful energy and heartfelt expression throughout the album. However, it also pointed out that the album reflects her youth and limited life experience at the time. While the overall listening experience evokes the sweetness of a first love, it contrasts with the complexities of reality, suggesting that there was still room for Tsai to deepen her interpretive artistry in the future.

Tencent Entertainment commented that the album represented a bold musical experiment for Tsai. The record label adopted a more open approach, moving away from strictly conventional styles and allowing for a richer variety of sounds. The review especially noted her performances in the songs "Show Your Love" and "Fall in Love with a Street" as signs of her gradual departure from the innocence of her early debut.

== Accolades ==
On May 18, 2001, Tsai received the Top 10 Most Popular Artists Award at the MTV Mandarin Awards. Later that year, on September 6, the music video for "Fall in Love with a Street" won the 2001 MTV Video Music Award for International Viewer's Choice.

== Track listing ==
Show Your Love – Standard / Celebration / Commemorative edition
No.	Title	Lyrics	Music	Producer(s)	Length
1.	"Show Your Love"	Benny Chen	Paul Lee	Paul Lee	4:18
2.	"Love Is Near" (快有愛)	Adam Hsu	Chen Wei	Chen Wei	3:15
3.	"Do You Still Love Me" (你還愛我嗎)	Kiki Hu	Azlan Abu Hassan	David Wu	4:23
4.	"Baby Face"	Hsieh Meng-chuan	Jae Chong	Jae Chong	3:45
5.	"If You Said Love Me on That Day" (如果那天你說愛我)	Sandee Chan	Sandee Chan	Peter Lee	4:08
6.	"Reluctant" (捨不得)	Hsieh Meng-chuan	Jimmy Ye	David Wu	4:59
7.	"Fall in Love with a Street" (愛上了一條街)	Hsieh Meng-chuan	Nobuhiro Makino	David Wu	4:24
8.	"Pretty Pretty Day"	Mao Mao	David Wu	David Wu	3:07
9.	"See at a Glance" (一眼就看見)	Daryl Yao	Tom Pan	Peter Lee	4:21
10.	"Feel Your Presence" (感覺你的存在)	Julian Yu	Chervun Liew	Paul Lee	4:05
Total length:					40:22

Show Your Love – Commemorative edition (VCD)
No.	Title	Length
1.	"Show Your Love" (music video)	4:19
2.	"Do You Still Love Me" (music video)	4:25
3.	"Opening VCR" / "Show Your Love" / "Baby Face" / "Love Is Near" (live video)	6:20
4.	"If You Said Love Me on That Day" (live video)	4:10
5.	"Feel Your Presence" (live video)	5:25
Total length:		24:39

== Release history ==
Region	Date	Format(s)	Edition	Distributor
China	December 22, 2000	CD; cassette	Standard	Push
Indonesia	December 22, 2000	Cassette	Standard	Universal
Malaysia	December 22, 2000	CD; cassette	Standard	Universal
Taiwan	December 22, 2000	CD; cassette	Standard	Universal
Taiwan	February 9, 2001	CD	Celebration	Universal
Taiwan	March 16, 2001	CD+VCD	Commemorative	Universal
