= Don't Stop (Jolin Tsai album) =

2000 studio album by Jolin Tsai

- Standard edition cover

Studio album by Jolin Tsai
- Released: April 26, 2000
- Genre: Pop
- Length: 41:04
- Labels: Universal; D Sound
- Producers: David Wu; Paul Lee; Peter Lee; Chen Wei

Jolin Tsai chronology
1019 (1999)	Don't Stop (2000)	Show Your Love (2000)

Singles from Don't Stop
- 1. "Don't Stop" Released: April 2000

Don't Stop is the second studio album by Taiwanese singer Jolin Tsai, released on April 26, 2000, by Universal. Produced by David Wu, Peter Lee, Paul Lee, and Chen Wei, the album blends elements of pop, hip-hop, rock, reggae, and R&B, marking the beginning of Tsai's signature style centered around upbeat dance tracks.

The album sold over 500,000 copies in Taiwan, ranking as the sixth best-selling album of the year and the second best-selling album by a female artist in 2000. To date, it remains her highest-selling album in Taiwan.

== Background and development ==
During the Christmas season of December 1999, Tsai traveled to Quad Studios in New York City to record three tracks for her new album—"Don't Stop", "Are You Happy", and "Eternity". While in the United States, she also collaborated with American photographer John N. to shoot the album cover and accompanying photo set.

== Writing and recording ==
The lead single, "Don't Stop", is a Mandarin adaptation of S Club 7's "Bring It All Back". Its lyrics capture the fearless dreams and romantic aspirations of a new generation of youth. "Don't Stop", along with the second single "Are You Happy" and "Eternity", were all recorded at Quad Studios in New York. For these tracks, Tsai once again collaborated with the four African-American backing vocalists who had contributed to her debut album 1019. "Sugar Sugar"—originally performed by The Archies—was reimagined in Tsai's version with a heavier infusion of hip-hop elements.

== Artwork ==
The album cover features a close-up portrait of Tsai, with tousled bangs and a subtle, ambiguous smile that conveys a sense of youthful innocence and tenderness.

== Release and promotion ==
One month before its official release, pre-orders for the album in Taiwan had already exceeded 140,000 copies. Beginning April 11, 2000, Universal held three exclusive listening sessions across Taiwan to preview the new songs. On April 16, 2000, Tsai held the Don't Stop Concert in Taichung. On June 1, 2000, Universal released a limited edition of 50,000 copies to celebrate the album's sales surpassing 400,000. This edition included a bonus photo book titled New York/Hawaii Documentary Photobook.

Later, on July 10, 2000, Tsai performed the Examinee Night Concert in Taipei. The following day, Universal released another limited edition of 50,000 copies to commemorate album sales exceeding 450,000. This version featured three music videos and three live performance videos from the Don't Stop Concert.

On September 5, 2000, Tsai released the video compilation titled Don't Stop Karaoke, which was available in three versions. The DVD version featured 17 music videos from both albums 1019 and Don't Stop. The VCD version included 12 music videos from the same albums, while the 2VCD version not only included the 12 music videos from the VCD version but also added content from the video album, 1019 I Can Concert.

=== Single and music videos ===
The single "Don't Stop" ranked number 17 on Hit FM Top 100 Singles of 2000 in Taiwan. The music videos for "Don't Stop" and "Are You Happy" were directed by Tony Lin, with "Are You Happy" featuring an appearance by Claire Chien. The video for "You Gotta Know" was directed by Kuang Sheng, while JP Huang directed the video for "What Kind of Love", which included a guest appearance by Michael Chang. The music video for "Sugar Sugar" was directed by Showx2.

=== Live performances ===
On May 21, 2000, Tsai performed "You Gotta Know" at the Presidential and Vice Presidential Inauguration Celebration Concert organized by TVBS.

== Commercial performance ==
The album ranked number 10 and number 14 on the 2000 annual sales charts of Taiwan's Rose Records and Tachung Records, respectively.

== Critical reception ==
Tencent Entertainment noted that Tsai's second album marked a shift from the ballad-driven approach of her debut to a more upbeat and cheerful sound, while still centering on themes of youthful romance. Up-tempo tracks like "Don't Stop" and "You Gotta Know", along with the ballad "Are You Happy", all portray the emotions of a young girl navigating youth. The songwriting team, which included Kuo Heng-chi, Jerry Huang, and Michael Tu, enhanced the album's mainstream appeal. In addition to returning producers Paul Lee, Peter Lee, and David Wu, the track "You Gotta Know" introduced a fresh dynamic through Tsai's first collaboration with producer Chen Wei. Though the latter part of the album incorporates rock and reggae elements, the overall tone remains firmly rooted in pop.

Sina Music remarked that while Tsai's debut album 1019 carried a noticeable R&B influence, her second effort, Don't Stop, pivoted toward mainstream Taiwanese pop, virtually abandoning R&B stylings. The review noted that her record label had yet to determine her long-term musical direction, especially as Tsai was expanding her presence in Japan, where she was dubbed "Hikaru Utada's junior". It suggested that a return to R&B might be possible in the future. The album was described as simple yet thoughtfully produced, affirming Tsai's vocal abilities and potential for growth.

== Accolades ==
The song "Don't Stop" received the Most Popular Song Award at the 7th China Music Awards and won the Best Dance Song of the Year (Hong Kong/Taiwan) at the 1st Top Chinese Music Awards.

== Track listing ==
Don't Stop – Standard / Victory / Reissue edition
No.	Title	Lyrics	Music	Producer(s)	Length
1.	"Don't Stop"	Mao Mao	Rachel Stevens; Hannah Spearritt; Bradley McIntosh; Jon Lee; Paul Cattermole; Jo O'Meara; Tina Barrett; Eliot Kennedy; Mike Percy; Tim Lever	Paul Lee	3:34
2.	"Are You Happy" (你快樂嗎)	Kiki Hu	Michael Tu	David Wu	4:36
3.	"What Kind of Love" (什麼樣的愛)	Jerry Huang	Jimmy Ye	Peter Lee	4:01
4.	"You Gotta Know"	Lu Hsueh-han	Chen Wei	Chen Wei	4:00
5.	"Eternity" (永恆)	Chuang Ching-wen	Peter Lee	Peter Lee	4:19
6.	"Everything's Gonna Be Alright" (嗨)	Benny Chen	Chervun Liew	Paul Lee	3:52
7.	"Words of Loneliness" (孤單的人總說無所謂)	Wu Yu-kang	Kuo Heng-chi	David Wu	4:56
8.	"Floating" (飄浮)	Mao Mao	Paul Lee	Paul Lee	4:05
9.	"Love Song for You" (唱這首歌)	Chuang Ching-wen	Lee Soo-young	David Wu	3:51
10.	"Sugar Sugar"	Andy Kim	Jeff Barry	David Wu	3:50
Total length:					41:04

Don't Stop – Celebration edition (VCD)
No.	Title	Length
1.	"Don't Stop" / "Out on the Street" / "Sugar Sugar" (live video)	16:45
2.	"Are You Happy" (live video)	4:16
3.	"You Gotta Know" (live video)	6:00
4.	"You Gotta Know" (music video)	4:00
5.	"What Kind of Love" (music video)	3:59
6.	"Are Your Happy" (music video)	4:36
Total length:		39:36

== Release history ==
Region	Date	Format(s)	Edition	Distributor
China	April 26, 2000	CD; cassette	Standard	Meika
Indonesia	April 26, 2000	Cassette	Standard	Universal
Taiwan	April 26, 2000	CD; cassette	Standard	Universal
Taiwan	June 1, 2000	CD	Victory	Universal
Taiwan	July 11, 2000	CD+VCD	Celebration	Universal
Taiwan	May 24, 2005	CD	Reissue	Universal
