= Fight as One =

Promotional single by Eason Chan and Jolin Tsai
- Released: April 3, 2020
- Studio: Snowman (Hong Kong); New Song (Taipei)
- Genre: Pop
- Length: 3:42
- Label: Yunnan Television
- Composer: Song Bingyang
- Lyricists: Andrew Chu; Eric Kwok; Jerald Chan
- Producer: Jerald Chan

Music video
- "Fight as One" on YouTube

"Fight as One" is a charity single by Hong Kong singer Eason Chan and Taiwanese singer Jolin Tsai, released on April 3, 2020, by Yunnan Television to support global efforts against the COVID-19 pandemic. Written by Andrew Chu, Eric Kwok, Jerald Chan, and Song Bingyang, and produced by Jerald Chan.

== Background and release ==
At the end of 2019, the COVID-19 outbreak began in Wuhan, China, and rapidly spread across the globe. On April 3, 2020, Chan and Tsai, invited by Yunnan Television, released the English charity song "Fight as One". The song is an English adaptation of "The Mountains and Rivers Rest in My Heart", originally performed by Cai Xukun and Tong Liya. Both Chan and Tsai shared that they found the English lyrics to be both meaningful and uplifting.

The song conveys a message of "a united world, fighting the pandemic without borders", and serves as a tribute to healthcare workers worldwide who have been at the forefront of battling the pandemic. Chan remarked, "Nothing can stop our love, nor our kindness and goodwill toward one another," while Tsai expressed her gratitude, saying, "Thanks to all the frontline workers everywhere, guarding all of us. Thank you, fight as one!"

== Music video ==
The music video for "Fight as One" premiered on April 3, 2020. Reports indicated that Chan and Tsai recorded and filmed their parts separately due to the pandemic, with the final product being edited together. The video featured photos of frontline healthcare workers from around the world, as well as everyday scenes of people dealing with the challenges of the pandemic.

=== Controversy ===
The release of the "Fight as One" music video sparked significant controversy in Taiwan. The video featured drawings by Latin American children that included messages such as "China, you can do it" and depictions of the Chinese national flag. Some Taiwanese netizens took issue with the lack of representation of Taiwanese medical workers, accusing the video of being Chinese propaganda. This criticism was compounded by the fact that the video received significantly more "dislike" than "like" votes on Universal's YouTube channels for Taiwan and Hong Kong, with numerous angry comments on both YouTube and Tsai's Facebook page. Some critics even labeled Tsai a "CCP bootlicking artist," accusing her of prioritizing the Chinese market. However, others defended Tsai, arguing that she had no control over the video's content and that the message of global unity was more important during the pandemic.

On April 6, 2020, Tsai addressed the backlash in a heartfelt Facebook post, writing:

"At this moment, I feel so small.
No matter how I will be described or shaped in the future, I want to deeply thank you, thank you for pulling me up with all your strength during my limited time on stage, for redeeming me in person, for accompanying me faithfully without leaving.
Maybe one day, suddenly, you will no longer need me, or no longer remember me. I still believe that this too is a gift of life I must accept.
Until then, I will live for myself with all my strength, laughing, crying, singing…
Thank you to everyone who has appeared in the fragments of my life.
May you still remember to sing for your own life today."

In response to the criticisms, China Times published an article defending Tsai, arguing that China's donation of medical supplies to various countries was factual. The newspaper pointed out that the drawings of the Chinese flag were expressions of gratitude from children, rather than a political endorsement. It also criticized some Taiwanese media and netizens for unfairly targeting Tsai, asserting that the content of the music video was largely determined by Yunnan Television, not by Tsai herself.

== Charts ==
=== Weekly charts ===
Chart (2020)	Peak position
China (Tencent)	15

== Credits and personnel ==
- Eric Kwok – vocal production (Eason Chan), recording engineering (Eason Chan)
- Andrew Chu – vocal production (Jolin Tsai), recording engineering (Jolin Tsai), backing vocals
- Stephen Ting – recording engineering (Jolin Tsai)
- Evan Chen – recording engineering (Jolin Tsai)
- Snowman Studio – vocal recording studio
- New Song Studio – vocal recording studio
- Ted Lo – string arrangement
- Wilson Lam – guitar
- Jerald Chan – backing vocal arrangement, backing vocals
- Jolin Tsai – backing vocals
- Victor Tse – mixing

== Release history ==
Release dates and formats for "Fight as One"
Region	Date	Format(s)	Distributor
China	April 3, 2020	Streaming	Yunnan Television
