= Where the Dream Takes You / If Don't Want =

"Where the Dream Takes You" / "If Don't Want"

Single by Jolin Tsai

from the album Lucky Number
- Released: June 28, 2001
- Genre: Pop
- Length: 8:10
- Label: Universal; D Sound
- Composers: "Where the Dream Takes You": Diane Warren; James Howard; "If Don't Want": Low Shao Ying; Chervun Liew
- Lyricist: Hsieh Meng-chuan
- Producers: "Where the Dream Takes You": David Wu "If Don't Want": Peter Lee; Paul Lee

Jolin Tsai singles chronology
"Show Your Love" (2000)	"Where the Dream Takes You" / "If Don't Want" (2001)	"Show Your Love / Fall in Love with a Street / You Gotta Know (remix)" (2002)

Music video
- "Where the Dream Takes You" on YouTube "If Don't Want" on YouTube

"Where the Dream Takes You" (Chinese: 情不自禁; pinyin: Qíng bù zì jìn; lit. 'Can't help it') and "If Don't Want" (Chinese: 如果不想要; pinyin: Rú guǒ bù xiǎng yào) are songs recorded by Taiwanese singer Jolin Tsai. Both songs were released together as a single on June 28, 2001, by Universal.

"Where the Dream Takes You" is a Mandarin adaptation of American singer Mya's song of the same name, originally composed by James Newton Howard and Diane Warren. The Chinese lyrics were written by Hsieh Meng-chuan, and the track was produced by David Wu. It served as the Mandarin theme song for Disney's animated film Atlantis: The Lost Empire (2001).

"If Don't Want" was written by Hsieh Meng-chuan, Low Shao Ying, and Chervun Liew, and produced by Peter Lee and Paul Lee.

== Background and release ==
On June 19, 2001, media outlets reported that Tsai would perform the Mandarin version of "Where the Dream Takes You" for Disney's Atlantis: The Lost Empire, making her the third artist, after Coco Lee and Jacky Cheung, to perform a Chinese-language theme song for a Disney film. The film, characterized by its adventurous narrative and romantic subplots, features a princess known for her determination and courage, qualities that were cited as aligning with Tsai's public image.

On June 21, 2001, reports indicated that Tsai's next studio album was expected to be released on July 13, 2001, with pre-orders opening on July 28, 2001.

== Composition and recording ==
In "Where the Dream Takes You", Tsai's vocal range is approximately half a semitone higher than Mya's original version. The song's lyrics and the film's storyline share themes of courage, perseverance, and the pursuit of dreams in both life and love.

"If Don't Want" is a mid-tempo ballad characterized by a subtle sense of melancholy. The lyrics emphasize sincerity, persistence, and tolerance in relationships. Tsai described the song as "absolutely tailor-made" for her vocal style and emotional expression.

== Release ==
The single "Where the Dream Takes You" / "If Don't Want" was released on June 28, 2001. On June 30, 2001, Tsai held a press event in Taipei to premiere "Where the Dream Takes You". The music video for "Where the Dream Takes You" was directed by Marlboro Lai, while the music video for "If Don't Want" was directed by Chin Cho and featured actor Ryan Kuo.

In collaboration with McDonald's, a McDonald's exclusive limited version of the single was also released as part of a promotional campaign.

== Track listings ==
- CD single
1. "Where the Dream Takes You" – 3:58
2. "If Don't Want" – 4:12
- CD single – McDonald's exclusive limited version
1. "Where the Dream Takes You" – 3:58

== Release history ==
Release dates and formats for "Where the Dream Takes You" / "If Don't Want"
Region	Date	Format(s)	Distributor
Taiwan	June 28, 2001	Radio airplay	Universal
Taiwan	June 28, 2001	CD	McDonald's
