= Yunnan Television =

Television network in Yunnan, China

Yunnan Television (YNTV)
- Industry: Television Broadcasting
- Founded: October 1, 1969
- Headquarters: Kunming, Yunnan, China
- Products: Television content, Television programming
- Website: www.yntv.cn

Yunnan Television or YNTV is a television station located in Yunnan, China. It began broadcasting on October 1, 1969.

== Channels ==
- Yunnan Satellite Channel
- Yunnan Television 2 (City Channel)
- Yunnan Television 3 (Entertainment Channel)
- Yunnan Television 4 (Life information Channel)
- Yunnan Television 5 (Movie Channel)
- Yunnan Television 6 (Public Channel)
- Yunnan Television 8 (Children Channel)
- Yunnan Lancang-Mekong International Channel

== See also ==
- List of Chinese-language television channels
- Television in the People's Republic of China
