= Dare for More =

Promotional single by various artist
- Language: Mandarin
- Released: May 31, 2004
- Genre: Pop
- Length: 3:56
- Label: Sony
- Composer: Andrew Tuason
- Lyricist: Albert Leung

Music video
- "Dare for More" on YouTube

"Dare for More" (Chinese: 藍色飛揚; pinyin: Lánsè fēiyáng) is a song performed by various artists, written by Albert Leung and Andrew Tuason. It served as the theme song for Pepsi's 2004 advertising campaign and was released as a promotional single on May 31, 2004.

== Background and release ==
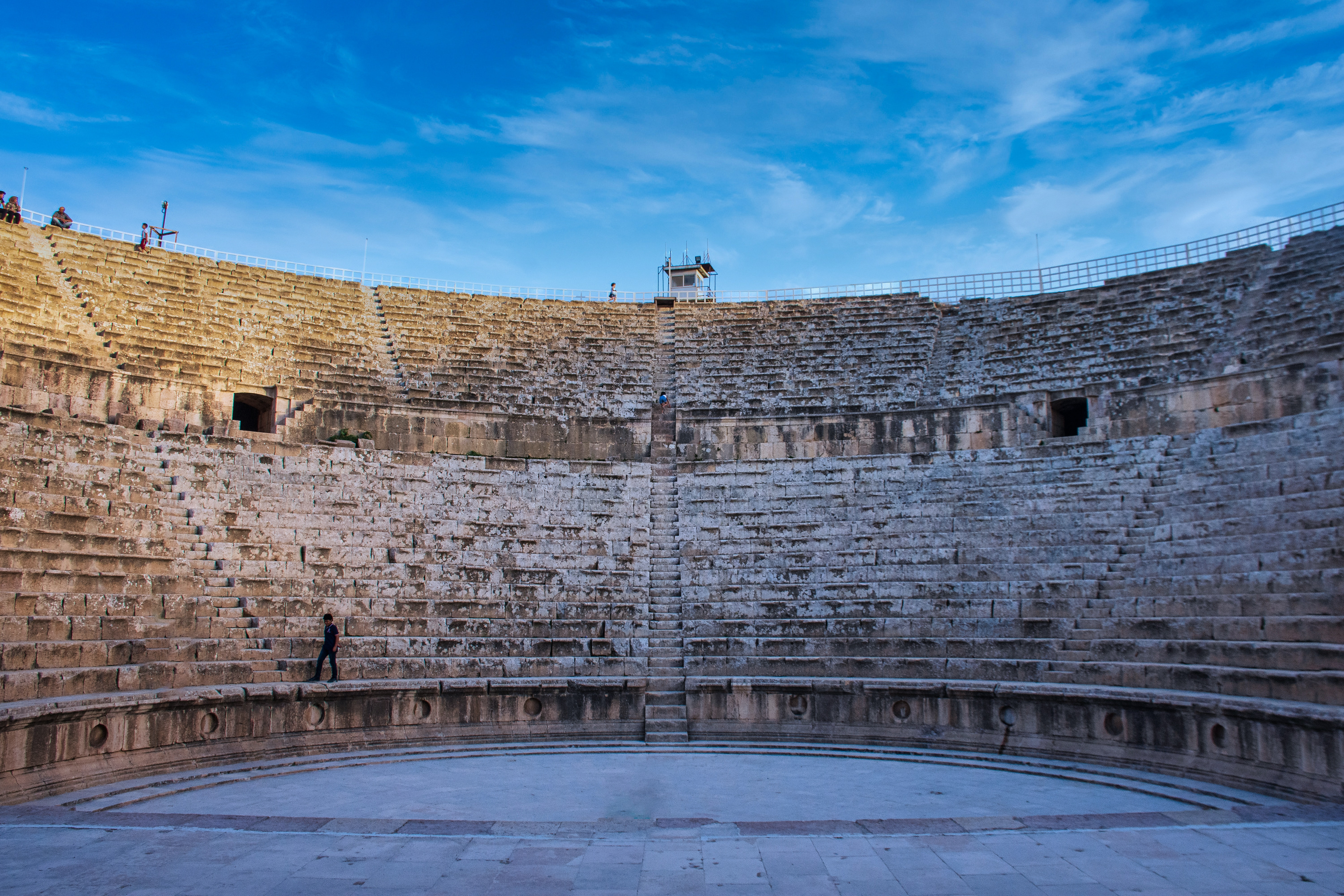
The South Theater (Jerash, Jordan), was one of the filming locations for the music video.

In April 2004, it was reported that nine Pepsi ambassadors, Aaron Kwok, Sammi Cheng, Jay Chou, Jolin Tsai, Edison Chen, and F4, traveled to Jordan to film a new Pepsi commercial. The advertisement, produced in a cinematic style, took ten months to prepare and had a budget exceeding HKD 100 million. All nine stars appeared in ancient-hero costumes for the shoot.

The commercial's theme song, "Dare for More", was performed by the nine ambassadors, with lyrics written by Albert Leung and music composed by Andrew Tuason. Before heading to Jordan, the artists recorded the song over 11 days in Hong Kong and Taiwan, with a rap section performed by Hanjin Tan.

In December 2004, Sony released a compilation album titled Pepsi Music Chart, which featured a version of "Dare for More" sung only by Jay Chou, Jolin Tsai, and F4.

== Live performances ==
On May 31, 2004, the nine Pepsi ambassadors attended the Pepsi Dare for More IX Stars Blue Legend Premiere Press Conference in Hong Kong, where they performed "Dare for More" together.

== Release history ==
Release dates and formats for "Dare for More"
Region	Date	Format(s)	Distributor
Taiwan	May 31, 2004	CD	Pepsi
