= Dance Collection =

2001 remix album by Jolin Tsai

Remix album by Jolin Tsai
- Released: April 2, 2002
- Genre: Dance
- Length: 44:13
- Labels: Universal; D Sound

Jolin Tsai chronology
Together (2001)	Dance Collection (2002)	Magic (2003)

Singles from Dance Collection
- 1. "Show Your Love / Fall in Love with a Street / You Gotta Know (remix)" Released: April 2, 2002

Jolin Tsai singles chronology
"Where the Dream Takes You" / "If Don't Want" (2001)	"Show Your Love / Fall in Love with a Street / You Gotta Know (remix)" (2002)	"The Spirit of Knight" (2002)

Dance Collection (Chinese: 電音舞道館) is a remix album by Taiwanese singer Jolin Tsai, released on April 2, 2002, by Universal. The album features remixed versions of 12 tracks from her discography during her time with Universal.

== Release ==
The album was released in two editions: a standard edition and a limited edition. The limited edition featured two different colored slipcases, with each version limited to 10,000 copies. In addition, Universal released a remixed medley single for the album featuring the tracks "Show Your Love", "Fall in Love with a Street", and "You Gotta Know".

== Critical reception ==
Tencent Entertainment commented that the album primarily consists of remixed versions of Tsai's well-known tracks from her time with Universal, describing it as "old wine in a new bottle". The release was seen largely as a transitional effort aimed at satisfying fans' anticipation during the nearly two-year gap without a new studio album due to her contract dispute. While the album includes several strong, danceable lead tracks, it also features some remixes where slower ballads were awkwardly transformed into dance numbers, resulting in a less cohesive listening experience.

== Track listing ==
No.	Title	Lyrics	Music	Length
1.	"Show Your Love" (remix)	Benny Chen	Paul Lee	4:21
2.	"If You Don't Want" (remix)	Hsieh Meng-chuan	Low Shao Ying; Chervun Liew	3:52
3.	"Are You Happy" (remix)	Kiki Hu	Michael Tu	3:26
4.	"Blame It on the Age" (remix)	Eric Lin	Michael Tu	4:04
5.	"Guessing" (remix)	Daryl Yao	Ronan Keating; Stephen Gately; Shane Lynch; Keith Duffy; Martin Brannigan; Ray Hedges	3:38
6.	"Can't Speak Clearly" (remix)	Mao Mao	Jay Chou	3:25
7.	"Love Is Near" (remix)	Adam Hsu	Chen Wei	3:36
8.	"You Gotta Know" (remix)	Lu Hsueh-han	Chen Wei	4:08
9.	"Words of Loneliness" (remix)	Wu Yu-kang	Kuo Heng-chi	3:18
10.	"Emptiness" (remix)	Chuang Ching-wen	Chervun Liew	3:22
11.	"Floating" (remix)	Mao Mao	Paul Lee	2:57
12.	"Fall in Love with a Street" (remix)	Hsieh Meng-chuan	Nobuhiro Makino	4:06
Total length:				44:13

== Release history ==
Region	Date	Format(s)	Edition(s)	Distributor
China	April 2, 2002	CD; cassette	Standard	Push
Malaysia	April 2, 2002	Cassette	Standard	Universal
Taiwan	April 2, 2002	CD; cassette	Standard; limited	Universal
