= The Great Artist (song) =

Single by Jolin Tsai

from the album Muse
- Language: Mandarin
- Released: August 15, 2012
- Recorded: 2012
- Studio: Platinum (Taipei); VIP (Taipei)
- Genre: Pop
- Length: 3:18
- Label: Warner; Mars
- Composers: Robin Jessen; Anne Judith Wik; Nermin Harambasic; Ronny Svendsen; Charite Viken Reinas; Eirik Johansen; Alexander Puntervold
- Lyricist: Matthew Yen
- Producer: Michael Lin

Jolin Tsai singles chronology
"Honey Trap" (2010)	"The Great Artist" (2012)	"Journey" (2013)

Music video
- “The Great Artist” on YouTube

"The Great Artist" (Chinese: 大藝術家; pinyin: Dà yìshùjiā) is a song by Taiwanese singer Jolin Tsai, featured on her twelfth studio album, Muse (2012). It was produced by Michael Lin, with lyrics penned by Matthew Yen, and a collaborative composition by Robin Jessen, Anne Judith Wik, Nermin Harambasic, Ronny Svendsen, Charite Viken Reinas, Eirik Johansen, and Alexander Puntervold. It was released on August 15, 2012, by Warner as the lead single from Muse.

Both the song and its music video were nominated for Song of the Year and Best Music Video, respectively, at the 24th Golden Melody Awards, with the song ultimately winning the Song of the Year award.

== Background ==
On February 22, 2012, Sam Chen of Warner Music Taiwan revealed on Weibo that Tsai's new album was scheduled for release in the summer of that year and was currently in the song selection phase. On June 12, 2012, media reports indicated that Tsai had completed recording half of the album's tracks. By June 25, 2012, further reports confirmed the album's expected release in August. Tsai's manager, Tom Wang, stated that this album was the most time-intensive project she had undertaken, with some songs being re-recorded multiple times. Moreover, Tsai incorporated many of her personal ideas into the music, music videos, and overall production. On July 10, 2012, Tsai revealed that the album was planned to be released around September 15—her birthday. On July 23, 2012, the media announced that the recording process had been completed.

== Composition and recording ==
The song encourages women to remain courageous and believe that they will ultimately find true love, with lyrics that portray a woman's perspective on an unfaithful male partner. Unlike Tsai's previous dance tracks, this song features multiple emotional shifts and includes a rap section with challenging melodic variations.

Tsai has explained that "The Great Artist" combines a strong rhythmic beat with electronic elements, incorporating chant-like melodies that convey a personal attitude. The lyrics, written by Matthew Yen, emphasize female empowerment and strength. During her performance, Tsai fully immerses herself in the role of a strong, independent woman.

== Music video ==
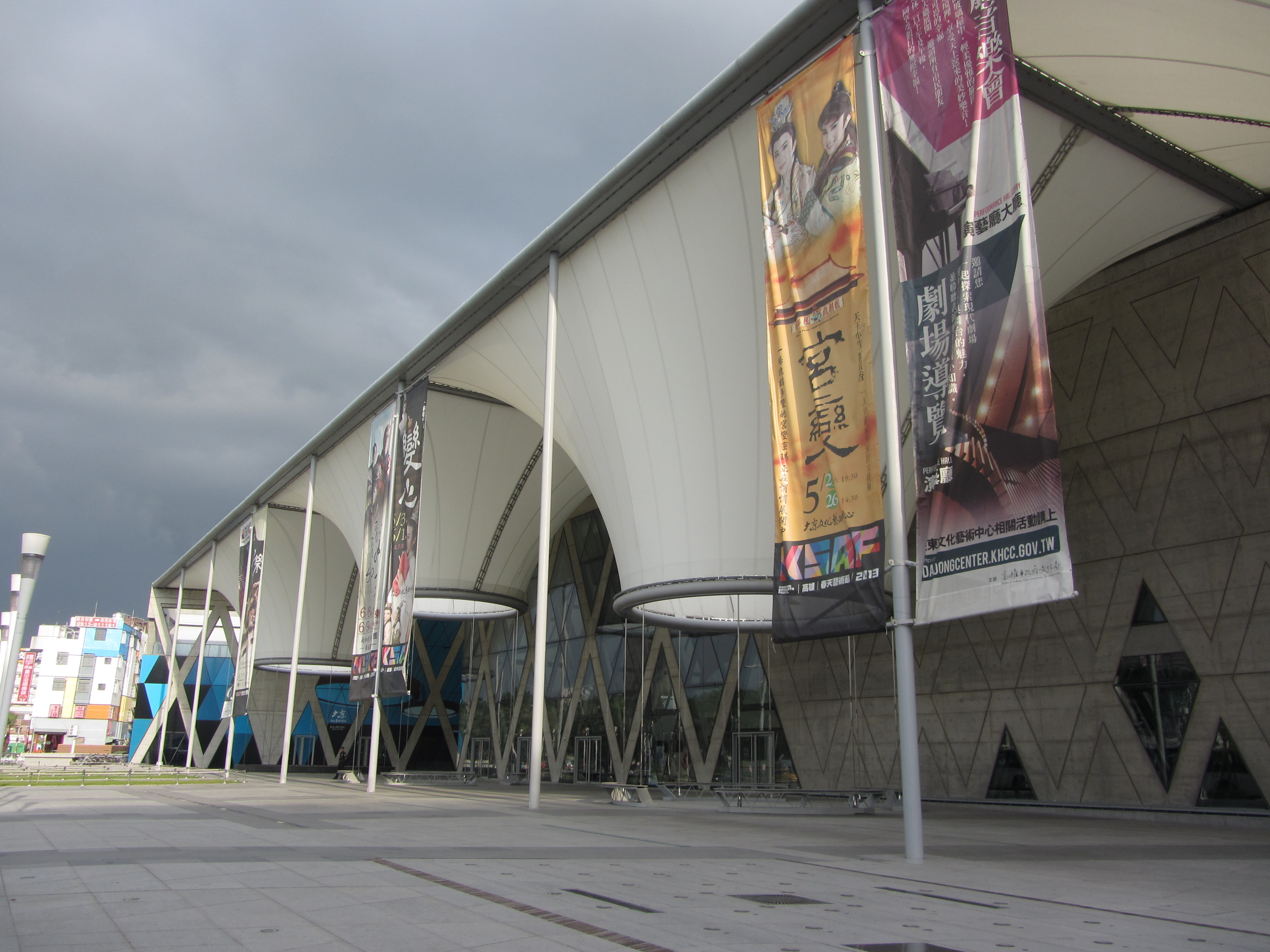
Dadong Arts Center, one of the filming locations for the music video of "The Great Artist"

On August 22, 2012, Tsai released the music video for "The Great Artist", directed by Muh Chen. Set against the backdrop of a "futuristic salon", Chen explained that salons in the 17th and 18th centuries were social venues in France where the bourgeoisie and aristocracy gathered to discuss literature and the arts, often hosted by culturally sophisticated women—resonating with the feminist themes of the song's lyrics. The music video was filmed in Kaohsiung and Taipei, Taiwan, over 38 hours. Three designers created five distinct outfits for the production, which had an estimated budget of approximately NT$8 million.

The following day, on August 23, 2012, Tsai held a promotional event for the music video at the Taipei Circle. The video ranked ninth among Taiwan's most-viewed YouTube videos of 2012 and became the first female artist's video to receive a perfect score on YinYueTai.

It was nominated for Best Music Video at the 24th Golden Melody Awards and won Best Visual Effects at the 2014 Berlin Music Video Awards. Additionally, it received the Bronze Award for Visual Design at the 2013 International Design Awards and the Visual Communication Design Award at the 2016 Golden Pin Design Awards.

== Commercial performance ==
The song was ranked second in Taiwan's Hit FM Top 100 Singles of 2012.

== Critical reception ==
Music critic Michael McCarthy praised "The Great Artist" as a rhythmically distinct mid-tempo opener that blends lush synthesizers with electronic elements. He noted its bold and confident beat, highlighting Tsai's powerful vocal delivery and determined tone, all of which serve to inspire listeners and align perfectly with the overarching theme of the album Muse (2012). Freshmusic magazine described the track as strong and attitude-driven, emphasizing its distinctive lyrical personality and deeming it a flawless introduction to the album.

PlayMusic's music critic Wei Ting highlighted "The Great Artist" as an impactful lead single, noting that its combination with a compelling music video left a lasting impression on audiences even before the album's release. He praised its fusion of electropop sounds with chant-like verses, a strong pop sensibility, and lyrics focused on female empowerment, while commending Tsai's more assertive vocal style.

Li Wenhao from Cool-Style website echoed this sentiment, remarking on the song's powerful momentum, rap-heavy verses, and infectious chorus, while noting that Tsai's rap performance and rhythmic precision have notably improved compared to her past work.

== Accolades ==
On April 9, 2013, the song was awarded one of the Top 20 Songs of the Year at the 3rd Global Chinese Golden Chart Awards. On April 26, 2013, the song won Top Songs of the Year for the Hong Kong/Taiwan category at the 2012 Music Radio China Top Chart Awards. On May 10, 2013, the song ranked among the Top 20 Most Popular Songs of the Year at the 13th Global Chinese Music Awards.

On May 22, 2013, the nominations for the 24th Golden Melody Awards were announced, with "The Great Artist" and its music video receiving nominations for Song of the Year and Best Music Video, respectively. On June 2, 2013, the song was named one of the Top 10 Mandarin Songs of the Year at the Hito Music Awards. On July 6, 2013, the song won Song of the Year at the 24th Golden Melody Awards.

== Live performances ==
On September 30, 2012, Tsai performed the song at the 2012 CCTV Mid-Autumn Festival Gala. On September 13, 2012, she appeared on the Hunan Television's variety show Happy Camp, where she also performed the song. On December 31, 2012, Tsai participated in the 2013 New Year's Eve Concert, organized by Hunan Television, and performed "The Great Artist". On January 19, 2013, she performed the song at the 8th KKBox Music Awards.

On January 30, 2013, she sang the song at Taiwan Music Night held in Paris. On April 18, 2013, Tsai performed the song at the 17th China Music Awards. On May 17, 2013, she took part in the 3rd Global Chinese Golden Chart North America Celebration Concert in Vancouver, where she performed "The Great Artist". On June 2, 2013, Tsai performed the song at the 2013 Hito Music Awards. On July 6, 2013, she performed "The Great Artist" at the 24th Golden Melody Awards.

== Credits and personnel ==
=== Recording and mixing studios ===
- Platinum Studio – recording studio
- VIP Studio – recording studio
- Pro Tool Mixing Studio – mixing studio

=== Personnel ===
- Fang Po-chieh – production assistance, recording engineering
- Michael Lin – harmony arrangement, electric guitar, recording engineering
- Jolin Tsai – backing vocals
- Yeh Yu-hsuan – recording engineering
- Ken Lewis – mixing engineering

== Release history ==
Release dates and formats for "The Great Artist"
Region	Date	Format(s)	Distributor
Various	August 15, 2012	Digital download; streaming; radio play	Warner
