= Happy New Year Do Re Mi =

Promotional single by Jolin Tsai, Liu Yuning, and TikTok influencers
- Language: Mandarin
- Released: January 24, 2019
- Genre: Pop
- Length: 3:52
- Label: ByteDance
- Composers: Huang Weitao; Yang Wangshu; Yu Boshu; Huang Yuhao; Silence Wang; Chen Shuguang; Lin Juncheng
- Lyricists: Guan Lei; Yang Wangshu; Tang Yuming; Wu Chengchen; Huang Yuhao; Silence Wang; Chen Shuguang; Lin Juncheng

Music video
- "Happy New Year Do Re Mi" on YouTube

"Happy New Year Do Re Mi" (Chinese: 新年抖來咪; pinyin: Xīnnián dǒu lái mī) is a song by Taiwanese singer Jolin Tsai, Chinese singer Liu Yuning, and various TikTok influencers. It was released on January 24, 2019, as the theme song for TikTok's 2019 Chinese New Year campaign.

== Composition ==
The song was created as part of TikTok's 2019 Chinese New Year campaign and creatively incorporates segments from several viral hits on the platform, including "Your Ex-Boyfriend", "Babo'erben Benbo'erba", "Learn to Meow", "Buy a Street", "Little Star", "Can You Give Me Your WeChat", and "East and West". The TikTok music team adapted the lyrics, while the track's rearrangement was handled by Chris, Ryoji, and Ant from FeiFan Music.

== Release ==
On January 24, 2019, ByteDance officially released the single "Happy New Year Do Re Mi", featuring Jolin Tsai, Liu Yuning, and a range of popular TikTok influencers including Zhang Xinyao, Wu Jiayu, Guo Congming, Nie Xiaoyu, Li Zeyou, Liu Zhijia, Ma Siyu, Wang Xinyu, Shen Zhongqi, Qu Yiting, LaoWang Oppa, GouDa, and Huang Meng. The song was accompanied by a music video, directed by Zou Fei, which was simultaneously launched on TikTok to coincide with the release, boosting its visibility and engagement on the platform.

== Commercial performance ==
The song peaked at number 75 on the Billboard China Top 100 chart.

== Charts ==
=== Weekly charts ===
Chart (2019)	Peak position
China (Billboard)	75

== Release history ==
Release dates and formats for "Happy New Year Do Re Mi"
Region	Date	Format(s)	Distributor
China	January 24, 2019	Streaming	ByteDance
