= Don't Stop (Jolin Tsai song) =

Single by Jolin Tsai

from the album Don't Stop
- Language: Mandarin
- Released: April 2000
- Studio: Form (Singapore); Plus (Taipei); Quad (New York)
- Genre: Pop
- Length: 3:34
- Label: Universal; D Sound
- Composers: Rachel Stevens; Hannah Spearritt; Bradley McIntosh; Jon Lee; Paul Cattermole; Jo O'Meara; Tina Barrett; Eliot Kennedy; Mike Percy; Tim Lever
- Lyricist: Mao Mao
- Producer: Paul Lee

Jolin Tsai singles chronology
"I Know You're Feeling Blue" (1999)	"Don't Stop" (2000)	"Show Your Love" (2000)

Music video
- "Don't Stop" on YouTube

"Don't Stop" is a song recorded by Taiwanese singer Jolin Tsai, featured on her second studio album Don't Stop (2000). The track is a Mandarin adaptation of S Club 7's song "Bring It All Back", originally written by Rachel Stevens, Hannah Spearritt, Bradley McIntosh, Jon Lee, Paul Cattermole, Jo O'Meara, Tina Barrett, Eliot Kennedy, Mike Percy, and Tim Lever. The Chinese lyrics were written by Mao Mao, and the song was produced by Paul Lee. It was released as the album's lead single in April 2000 by Universal.

== Background and release ==
During Christmas 1999, Tsai traveled to Quad Studios in New York City to record "Don't Stop". On April 26, 2000, she released her second studio album Don't Stop, with the title track serving as the lead single. The accompanying music video was directed by Tony Lin.

== Composition and recording ==
"Don't Stop" features lyrics centered on youthful optimism and the fearless pursuit of dreams and love. The recording took place at Quad Studios in New York and includes backing vocals from four African-American singers who had previously contributed to Tsai's debut album 1019 (1999).

== Commercial performance ==
The song reached number 14 on Hit FM Top 100 Singles of 2000 in Taiwan.

== Awards ==
"Don't Stop" won Most Popular Song at the 7th China Music Awards and Best Hong Kong/Taiwan Dance Song at the inaugural Top Chinese Music Awards.

== Credits and personnel ==
- Chen Wei-chien – production assistance
- Andy Peterson – bass
- Luke Mason – drums
- Danny Madden – backing vocal arrangement, backing vocals
- Stephanie James – backing vocals
- Karen Bernod – backing vocals
- Sean Chan – recording engineering
- Eric Wang – recording engineering
- Freddie Ho – recording engineering
- Mike Anzel – recording engineering
- Form Studio – recording studio
- Plus Studio – recording studio
- Quad Studios – recording studio
- David Wu – mixing production
- Jeremy Lin – mixing engineering
- Premium Studio – mixing studio

== Release history ==
Release dates and formats for "Don't Stop"
Region	Date	Format(s)	Distributor
China	April 2000	Radio airplay	Meika
Taiwan	April 2000	Radio airplay	Universal
