= Living with the World =

Single by Jolin Tsai
- Released: July 16, 1999
- Genre: Pop
- Length: 3:56
- Label: Universal; D Sound
- Composer: Ronald Ng
- Lyricist: Chuang Ching-Wen
- Producers: Peter Lee; Paul Lee

Jolin Tsai singles chronology
"Living with the World" (1999)	"The Rose" (1999)

Music video
- "Living with the World" on YouTube

"Living with the World" (Chinese: 和世界做鄰居; pinyin: Hé shìjiè zuò línjū) is a song by Taiwanese singer Jolin Tsai for her debut studio album, 1019 (1999). The song was written by Chuang Ching-wen and Ronald Ng, and produced by Peter Lee and Paul Lee. It was released as a single on July 16, 1999, by Universal, and served as the annual theme song for 7-Eleven Taiwan. The single was sold exclusively at 7-Eleven convenience stores and marked Tsai's first commercial endorsement.

== Background ==
In May 1998, Tsai gained public attention by winning a singing competition organized by MTV Mandarin. Following her win, she signed a recording contract with Universal in March 1999, becoming one of the label's key new artists.

To prepare her for debut, Universal arranged regular training sessions in singing, dancing, and media presentation. Tsai also received language instruction and was sent abroad to observe international performers in Ireland, Japan, the United States, and the United Kingdom.

== Release ==
"Living with the World" was released on July 16, 1999, as her debut single. The song was used as the theme for that year's 7-Eleven Taiwan advertising campaign and was sold exclusively through the convenience store chain. In its second week of release, the single sold over 20,000 copies in Taiwan.

== Music video ==
The music video for "Living with the World" incorporated footage of rescue and relief efforts following the 1999 Jiji earthquake in Taiwan. The video featured scenes of emergency workers and volunteers, interspersed with shots of Tsai performing. It was intended as a tribute to the collective support shown by various sectors of society during the disaster, with Tsai expressing gratitude for the national and international aid efforts.

== Track listing ==
- CD single
1. "Living with the World" – 3:56
2. "Living with the World" (instrumental) – 3:56

== Release history ==
Release dates and formats for "Living with the World"
Region	Date	Format(s)	Distributor
Taiwan	July 16, 1999	CD	Universal
