= The Spirit of Knight =

Single by Jolin Tsai
- Language: Mandarin
- Released: July 23, 2002
- Studio: J&A (Taipei)
- Genre: Pop
- Length: 4:17
- Label: Sony; Era
- Composer: Jay Chou
- Lyricist: Jolin Tsai
- Producer: Jay Chou

Jolin Tsai singles chronology
"Show Your Love / Fall in Love with a Street / You Gotta Know (remix)" (2002)	"The Spirit of Knight" (2002)	"Magic" (2003)

Music video
- "The Spirit of Knight" on YouTube

"The Spirit of Knight" (Chinese: 騎士精神; pinyin: Qíshì jīngshén) is a song recorded by Taiwanese singer Jolin Tsai for her fifth studio album, Magic (2003). The track was written by Tsai, with composition and production by Jay Chou. It served as the theme song for the Tourism Authority of Thailand's campaign "Amazing Thailand: Siamese Style" and was released as a single on July 23, 2002, by Sony.

== Background ==
In January 2002, media outlets reported that Tsai was preparing material for a new album and speculated that she would sign with Sony. On April 5, 2002, further reports indicated that the album was expected to be released in September and that Tsai might collaborate with management company Mars. On April 23, 2002, Tsai officially signed a recording contract with Sony.

== Composition ==
"The Spirit of Knight" features lyrics written by Tsai, expressing a young woman's longing for protection and emotional resilience. The recording process reportedly took three days to complete. Jay Chou stated that his intention was to help Tsai move beyond her established "sweetheart idol" image by introducing hip-hop and rap elements, thereby expanding her musical style and artistic versatility.

== Music video ==
The accompanying music video for "The Spirit of Knight" was directed by Tony Lin and premiered on July 23, 2002. Filmed on location at Ayutthaya Historical Park and Wat Yai Chai Mongkhon in Thailand, the video combines imagery inspired by ancient Rome with cultural and ethnic motifs from Southeast Asia. Tsai described the visual concept as aiming to convey both grandeur and cultural fusion.

== Live performances ==
Tsai performed "The Spirit of Knight" at the 2003 New Year's Eve Concert in Taiwan on December 31, 2002. She subsequently performed the song at CTS's Lantern Festival Concert on February 15, 2003, Hunan TV's Music Continued on August 13, 2003, and at the Believe in Taiwan Party event on October 10, 2003.

== Credits and personnel ==
- Jay Chou – backing vocals arrangement, backing vocals
- Jolin Tsai – backing vocals
- Gary Yang – recording engineering
- J&A Studio – recording studio
- Dave Yang – mixing engineering
- Life Studio – mixing studio

== Release history ==
Release dates and formats for "The Spirit of Knight"
Region	Date	Format(s)	Distributor
Taiwan	July 23, 2002	Radio airplay	Sony
