= Muse (Jolin Tsai album) =

2012 studio album by Jolin Tsai

- Standard edition cover

Studio album by Jolin Tsai
- Released: September 14, 2012
- Genre: Pop
- Length: 40:19
- Labels: Warner; Mars
- Producers: Michael Lin; Peggy Hsu; JJ Lin; Tanya Chua

Jolin Tsai chronology
Ultimate (2012)	Muse (2012)	Myself World Tour (2013)

Singles from Muse
- 1. "The Great Artist" Released: August 15, 2012

Muse is the twelfth studio album by Taiwanese singer Jolin Tsai, released on September 14, 2012, by Warner. Blending pop music with pop art, the album spans both mainstream and indie styles, and was co-produced by Michael Lin, Peggy Hsu, JJ Lin, and Tanya Chua.

The album sold over 95,000 copies in Taiwan, ranking as the third best-selling album of 2012 and the top-selling album by a female artist that year. It received four nominations at the 24th Golden Melody Awards, including Best Mandarin Album, Song of the Year for "The Great Artist", Best Music Video for the same track, and Best Mandarin Female Singer for Tsai. Ultimately, "The Great Artist" won the award for Song of the Year.

== Background and development ==
On February 22, 2012, Warner's Sam Chen revealed on Sina Weibo that Tsai's new album was scheduled for release during the summer of the same year, and noted that the album was still in the song selection stage at the time. On June 12, 2012, media reports stated that Tsai had already completed recording half of the album's tracks. On June 25, 2012, it was reported that the album was expected to be released in August. Tsai's manager, Tom Wang, shared that this album was the one she had spent the most time recording, with several tracks being re-recorded multiple times. He added that Tsai had incorporated her personal ideas into every aspect of the production, including the music, music videos, and photoshoots. On July 10, 2012, Tsai revealed that the album was expected to be released around her birthday on September 15. Later, on July 23, 2012, media outlets reported that Tsai had completed recording the entire album.

== Writing and production ==
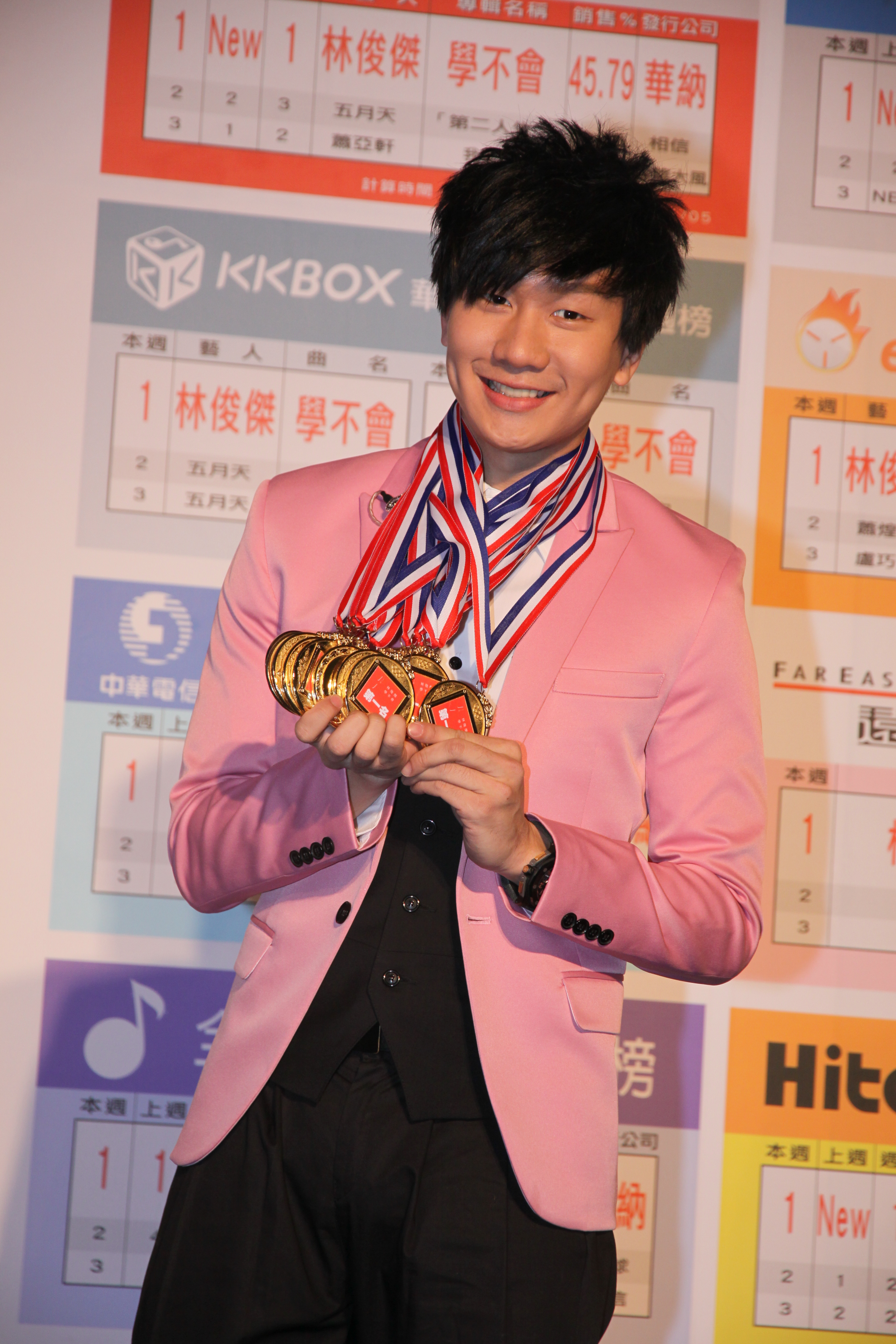
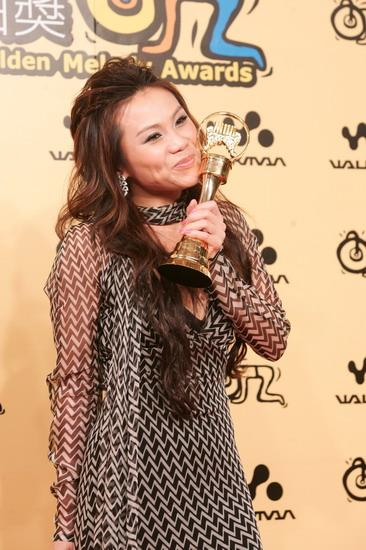
JJ Lin (left) and Tanya Chua (right), two collaborators on the album

The lead single, "The Great Artist", encourages women to maintain a courageous and steadfast attitude, believing that true love will ultimately be found. It portrays a playboy male partner from a female perspective. Unlike Tsai's previous dance tracks, this song features multiple emotional shifts, with rap sections that present greater vocal challenges than before. Tsai explained that the melody is innovative, incorporating electronic elements, and the lyrics are assertive, allowing her to embody a strong female persona in the performance.

"Wandering Poet" centers on a romantic poet characterized by self-centeredness, expressing both joy and sorrow. Peggy Hsu noted that the arrangement is narrative-driven and classical in style; despite the complexity of the melody, Tsai's vocal delivery makes the song accessible and easy to understand. "Dr. Jolin" draws inspiration from the 2012 apocalypse myth, encouraging people to face reality with humor and embrace their authentic selves.

"Mosaic" tells the story of some women losing themselves in love, changing to meet the expectations of their male partners. "Spying on You Behind the Fence" uses the metaphor of a fence to symbolize emotional distance in love, portraying how those who possess happiness can still doubt it due to pessimistic feelings. "Fantasy" inspired by the emotional lives of the LGBTQ+ community, is intended by Tsai to convey a message of equality for everyone in love. "I" reveals Tsai's vulnerable side beyond the stage spotlight. Tanya Chua remarked that this song invites listeners into Tsai's inner world and prompts reflection on whether people would still love the true self beneath external appearances.

"Beast" features lyrics written by Tsai herself, inspired by her everyday emotional experiences. The song blends romantic stories with playful and lighthearted elements. "Friday the 13th", inspired by jokes among friends, encourages singles to enjoy Valentine's Day with happiness. "Color Photos" evokes Tsai's memories of fans organizing her photographs, expressing the timeless beauty captured in those images. "Someone", inspired by a live performance from Tizzy Bac and written by Chen Hui-ting, showcases Tsai's vocal versatility.

== Title and artwork ==
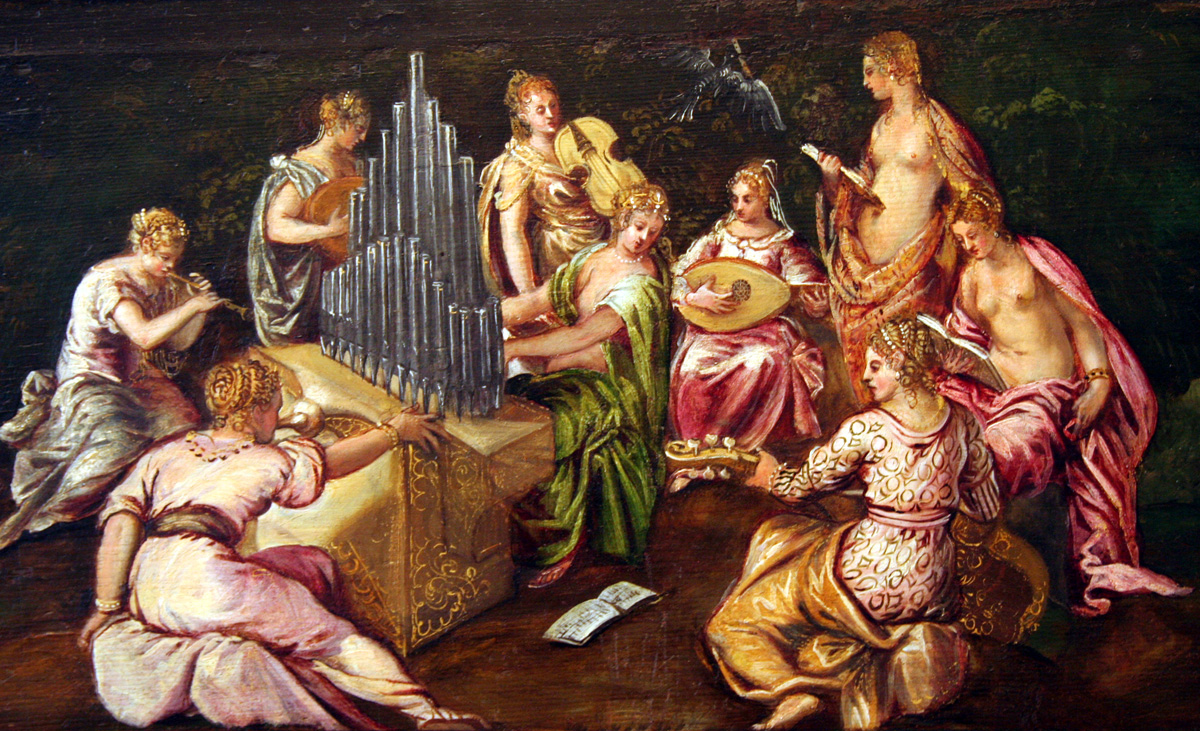
The Muses are the nine inspirational goddesses in ancient Greek religion and mythology, presiding over literature, science, and the arts.

The album title Muse refers to the Muses, the nine inspirational goddesses in ancient Greek religion and mythology who preside over literature, science, and the arts. The term is often used metaphorically to describe a person who inspires artists, musicians, or writers. Tsai explained that the meaning behind the album title is inspiration. She emphasized that, to her, art is not something obscure or difficult to grasp, but rather an expression derived from everyday life. Through singing and performing, she brings these inspirations into her work.

On July 23, 2012, Tsai released the first set of promotional photos for the album, shot by Guillaume Millet with wardrobe designed by Chen Shao-yen. Chen shared that the design inspiration came from the style of French cabaret singers in the 1930s, who typically presented a charming aura through a gender-neutral yet sensual look—an image that aligned perfectly with Tsai's persona and the album's musical style. The photo shoot took place in Paris, with a budget reaching NT$8 million.

The album's second set of promotional photos was taken at the Musée des Arts Forains, a funfair art museum in Paris that served as a filming location for the movie Midnight in Paris (2011). The wardrobe for this set was also designed by Chen Shao-yen, who said the style was inspired by the lead single "The Great Artist", combining sensuality with boldness to suit the female character portrayed in the song.

Tsai's photos taken in France were included in the album's pre-order version, the "Muse of Dream" edition, while the cover and inner-page outfits of another pre-order version, the "Muse of Love" edition, were designed by Tomas Chan. On the single cover for "The Great Artist", Tsai wore a traditional headdress from an ethnic minority in Yunnan, China, which had been passed down from the ancestors of the collector who obtained it during travels in China in the 18th or 19th century. The official album cover and booklet photos were shot by Tong Meng, with packaging designed by Aaron Nieh. The deluxe edition of the album featured cover and booklet photos by Liang Su, with packaging still designed by Aaron Nieh.

== Release and promotion ==
On August 22, 2012, Warner announced that pre-orders for the album were officially open, offering two versions: the "Muse of Dream" edition and the "Muse of Love" edition. The album was scheduled for release on September 14. On September 13, 2012, Tsai held a press conference for the album launch at the Central Academy of Fine Arts in Beijing, China. On October 6, she held the Muse Concert in Tainan, Taiwan. Later that month, on October 26, Tsai released the deluxe version of the album, which included five additional music videos and live performance footage from the Muse Concert.

=== Single ===
Dadong Arts Center, one of the filming locations for the music video of "The Great Artist"

On August 15, 2012, Tsai released the single "The Great Artist". On August 22, 2012, she unveiled the music video for the song, which was directed by Muh Chen. The video is set in a "futuristic salon", a concept inspired by 17th and 18th-century French salons—social gatherings where members of the bourgeoisie and aristocracy discussed literature and the arts. Chen explained that these salons were typically hosted by intelligent and elegant noblewomen, a setting that aligned with the song's feminist themes. The music video was filmed over 38 hours in Kaohsiung and Taipei. It featured five different outfits designed by three stylists, with a total production cost of NT$8 million. On August 23, 2012, Tsai held a promotional event for the music video at the Taipei Circle. The video ranked number 9 on YouTube's list of most-viewed videos in Taiwan for 2012 and became the first music video by a female artist to receive a perfect score on YinYueTai.

=== Music videos ===
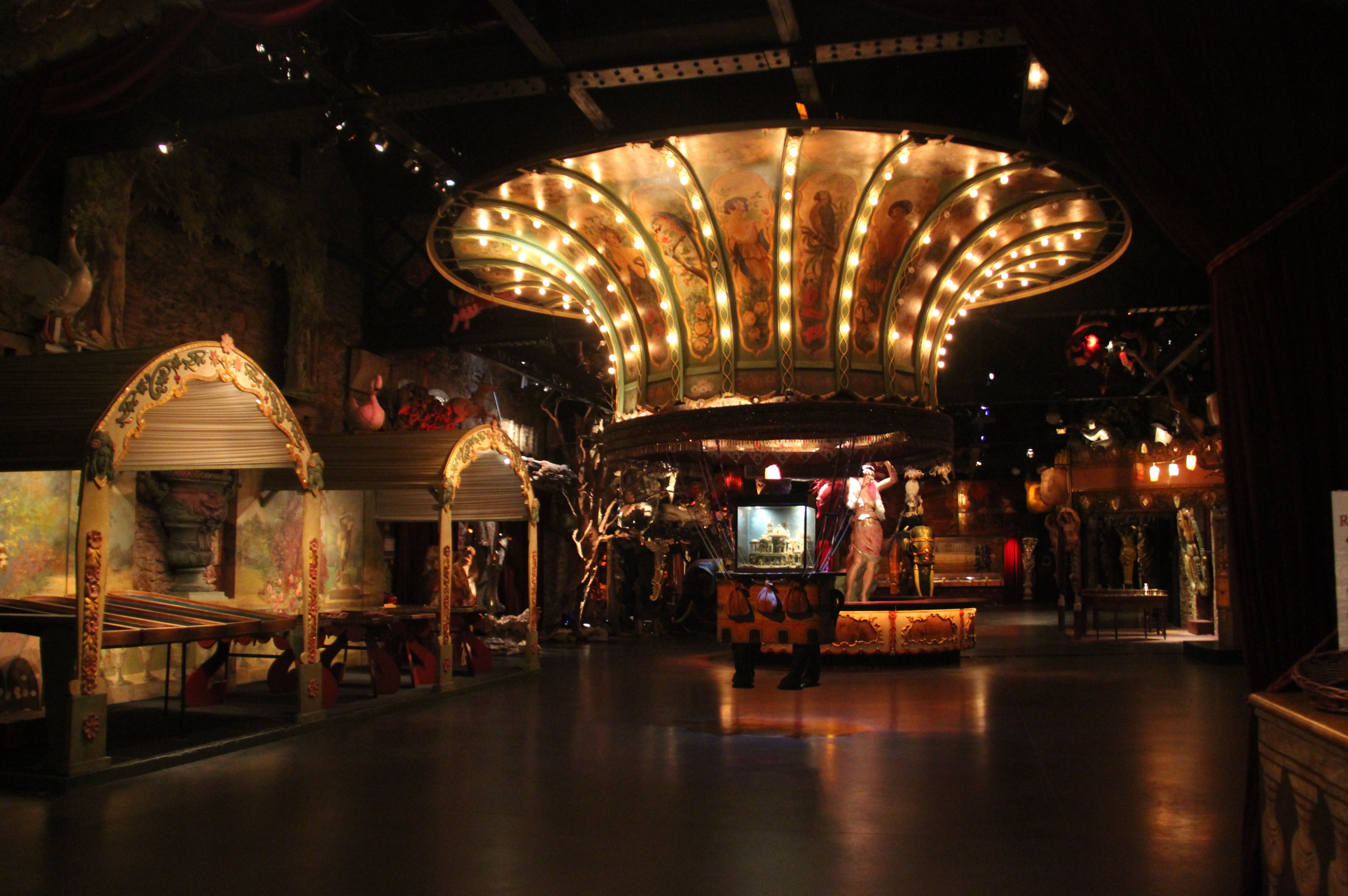
Musée des Arts Forains, one of the filming locations for the music video of "Spying on You Behind the Fence"

On September 11, 2012, Tsai released the music video for "Wandering Poet", directed by JP Huang and starring Ariel Lin and Austin Lin. The video tells the story of a woman who falls in love with a poetic artist, only to discover that the love she possesses is merely a replica. Tsai shared that during the recording process, she was reminded of the protagonist in the film Black Swan (2010), and sought to express the duality every woman experiences in love—an external self and an internal self. In the video, her vocal performance reflects the "black swan", while Ariel Lin, who fearlessly pursues love, represents the "white swan".

On September 24, 2012, Tsai released the music video for "Dr. Jolin", directed by Marlboro Lai. In the video, she plays a doctor from a futuristic world, exploring themes of gender fluidity and promoting gender equality. On October 3, 2012, she released the music video for "Mosaic", directed by Chen Hung-i. Shot entirely in black and white, the video highlights the song's emotional and lyrical depth. On October 15, 2012, Tsai unveiled the music video for "Spying on You Behind the Fence", directed by Jude Chen. Opening with the image of a black cat—a symbol of cautious femininity in love—the video adopts a European aesthetic and voyeuristic perspective.

On October 25, 2012, the music video for "Fantasy", directed by Bill Chia, was released. Set in a metaphorical "Garden of Eden", it was filmed at the Future Pavilion in Taipei Expo Park. The video conveys a message that love transcends race, gender, and skin color. Tsai emphasized that love is equal and noted that the song's lyrics reflect the nature of modern relationships.

On December 10, 2012, Tsai released the music video for "I", directed by Fu Tien-yu. The video features her removing her makeup and gazing at her bare-faced reflection, symbolizing introspection and vulnerability. On February 22, 2013, Tsai released the music videos for "Color Photos" and "Friday the 13th", both directed by Jude Chen and starring Johnny Yang and Phoebe Lin. On March 13, 2013, the music video for "Beast", also directed by Bill Chia, was released. The video explores the tension between consciousness and the subconscious, visually interpreting the inner emotional struggle.

=== Live performances ===
On September 30, 2012, Tsai performed the song "The Great Artist" at the 2012 CCTV Mid-Autumn Festival Gala. On September 13, 2012, Tsai appeared on the Chinese variety show Happy Camp on Hunan TV, where she performed "The Great Artist" and "Mosaic". On November 5, 2012, she participated in the recording of Hunan TV's Your Face Sounds Familiar, performing "Fantasy" and "Dr. Jolin". On December 31, 2012, she took part in Hunan TV's New Year's Eve Concert, where she performed "Beast" and "The Great Artist". On January 19, 2013, Tsai performed "The Great Artist", "Fantasy", and "Dr. Jolin" at the 8th KKBox Music Awards.

On January 30, 2013, she performed "The Great Artist", "Beast", "Fantasy", and "Dr. Jolin" at the Taiwan Music Night held in Paris. On April 18, 2013, Tsai performed "The Great Artist" and "Dr. Jolin" at the 17th China Music Awards. On May 17, 2013, she participated in the 3rd Global Chinese Golden Chart North America Concert in Vancouver, where she performed "The Great Artist" and "Dr. Jolin". On June 2, 2013, Tsai performed "The Great Artist" and "Dr. Jolin" at the 2013 Hito Music Awards. On July 6, she took part in the 24th Golden Melody Awards, where she performed "The Great Artist".

== Commercial performance ==
On September 26, 2012, Tsai held a press conference in Taipei, Taiwan, to celebrate the commercial success of her album. During the event, it was announced that the album had topped the weekly sales charts in its first week of release at major Taiwanese retailers, including Pok'elai, Eslite, Chia Chia, G-Music, and Five Music. In 2012, the album ranked number eight on the year-end sales chart of Pok'elai, number two on G-Music's annual chart, and number two on Five Music's annual chart. By December 31, 2012, the album had sold over 95,000 copies in Taiwan, becoming the third best-selling album of the year and the highest-selling album by a female artist. In 2013, the album continued to perform strongly, ranking number eight on G-Music's annual chart.

Additionally, the songs "The Great Artist", "Wandering Poet", and "Dr. Jolin" ranked number two, number ten, and number 24 respectively on Taiwan's Hit FM Top 100 Singles of 2012.

== Critical reception ==
Professional ratings
Review scores
Source	Rating
Freshmusic	7.5/10
PlayMusic	4/5 stars
Tencent Entertainment	7/10

Wei Ting, a critic for PlayMusic, described the album as a model for contemporary pop music, praising its clear thematic focus, well-balanced pacing, and well-executed packaging. He noted that it successfully satisfied Tsai's existing fanbase while also expanding into new markets. Another critic, Hui Lan, gave the album a rating of 4 out of 5, highlighting the outstanding arrangement and mixing of the dance tracks. She also praised Tsai's sweet and crystal-clear vocals, stating that she demonstrated the vocal prowess expected of a diva, excelling in both ballads and upbeat songs.

Freshmusic magazine rated the album 7.5 out of 10, recognizing Tsai's effort to incorporate new musical elements. While noting that there was still room for improvement in her interpretation, the review emphasized that she had moved away from overly commercialized or superficial styles, signaling a transformation in her artistic direction. Tencent Entertainment gave the album a score of 7 out of 10, acknowledging its pop foundation but also pointing out a notable evolution in its musical tone. The review commended Tsai's creative team, particularly for collaborating with a range of independent and niche artists on the album.

Critic Michael McCarthy described Muse as a richly colorful and pure pop album, full of depth and worthy of repeated listening. Meanwhile, critic Jamie Lee regarded Muse as one of the most groundbreaking albums of the year, applauding Tsai's fearless innovation and her efforts to set new standards in the Mandopop industry.

== Accolades ==
On September 17, 2012, Tsai was nominated for Best Asian Act at the 2012 MTV Europe Music Awards for the album. On January 3, 2013, she won the Yahoo Asia Buzz Awards for Top 10 Most Popular Female Singers of the Year. On January 19, 2013, Tsai was recognized as one of the Top 10 Singers at the 8th KKBox Music Awards. On April 9, 2013, the album was awarded Best Mandarin Album at the 3rd Global Chinese Golden Chart Awards, while the song "The Great Artist" was recognized as one of the Top 20 Songs of the Year. Tsai also received the Best Female Singer. On April 13, 2013, Tsai won Best Hong Kong/Taiwan Female Artist at the 1st V Chart Awards.

On April 18, 2013, the album was awarded Best Hong Kong/Taiwan Album at the 17th China Music Awards, and Tsai won Most Popular Asian Singer. On April 26, 2013, the song "The Great Artist" won Best Mandarin Song at the 2012 Music Radio China Top Chart Awards, while Tsai received Most Popular Hong Kong/Taiwan Female Singer. On May 10, 2013, "The Great Artist" was recognized one of the Top 20 Mandarin Songs at the 13th Global Chinese Music Awards, and Tsai ranked among the Top 5 Female Singers.

On May 22, 2013, the 24th Golden Melody Awards announced its nominees, with the album receiving a nomination for Best Mandarin Album, and "The Great Artist" and its music video being nominated for Song of the Year and Best Music Video, respectively. Tsai was also nominated for Best Mandarin Female Singer. On June 2, 2013, "The Great Artist" won Top 10 Mandarin Songs of the Year at the Hito Music Awards, while Tsai received Best Female Singer, Global Media Recommended Female Singer, and Global Chinese Outstanding Artist awards.

On July 6, 2013, "The Great Artist" won Song of the Year at the 24th Golden Melody Awards. On September 3, 2013, Tsai was recognized one of the Top 10 Stars at the 4th Top 10 Stars Awards. On November 22, 2013, "Mosaic" won Top 10 Songs at the 18th Singapore Hit Awards, and Tsai was awarded Most Popular Female Singer.

== Track listing ==
Muse – Standard / Special Limited edition
No.	Title	Lyrics	Music	Producer(s)	Length
1.	"The Great Artist" (大藝術家)	Matthew Yen	Robin Jessen; Anne Judith Wik; Nermin Harambasic; Ronny Svendsen; Charite Viken Reinas; Eirik Johansen; Alexander Puntervold	Michael Lin	3:18
2.	"Dr. Jolin"	Peggy Hsu	Iggy Strange Dahl; Johan Moraeus; Christoffer Vikberg	Michael Lin	3:45
3.	"Fantasy" (迷幻)	Greeny Wu	Mikko Tamminen; Udo Mechels; Rike Boomgaarden	Michael Lin	3:29
4.	"Friday the 13th" (十三號星期舞)	Jimmy Chou	Pasi Siitonen; Adam Powers; Nalle Ahlstedt	Michael Lin	3:18
5.	"Beast"	Jolin Tsai	Tarmo Keranen; Karin Fransson	Michael Lin	2:39
6.	"Spying on You Behind the Fence" (柵欄間隙偷窺你)	Greeny Wu	Greeny Wu	Michael Lin	2:38
7.	"Color Photos" (彩色相片)	Greeny Wu	Greeny Wu	Michael Lin	3:51
8.	"Wandering Poet" (詩人漫步)	Peggy Hsu	Peggy Hsu	Peggy Hsu	5:07
9.	"Someone" (有人)	Chen Hui-ting	Chen Hui-ting	Michael Lin	4:00
10.	"Mosaic" (馬賽克)	Tom Wang	JJ Lin	JJ Lin	4:08
11.	"I" (我)	Xiao Han	Tanya Chua	Tanya Chua	4:06
Total length:					40:19

Muse – Special Limited edition (DVD 1)
No.	Title	Length
1.	"The Great Artist" (live video)	3:25
2.	"Beast" (live video)	2:43
3.	"Color Photos" (live video)	3:51
4.	"Mosaic" (live video)	4:03
5.	"Someone" (live video)	3:58
6.	"Spying on You Behind the Fence" (live video)	2:40
7.	"I" (live video)	4:13
8.	"Wandering Poet" (live video)	4:58
9.	"Fantasy" (live video)	3:30
10.	"Friday the 13th" (live video)	3:24
11.	"Dr. Jolin" (live video)	3:49
Total length:		40:34

Muse – Special limited edition (DVD 2)
No.	Title	Length
1.	"The Great Artist" (music video)	4:31
2.	"Wandering Poet" (music video)	5:55
3.	"Dr. Jolin" (music video)	3:43
4.	"Mosaic" (music video)	4:01
5.	"Spying on You Behind the Fence" (music video)	2:40
Total length:		20:50

== Release history ==
Region	Date	Format(s)	Edition(s)	Distributor
Various	September 14, 2012	Streaming; digital download	Standard	Mars
Various	October 26, 2012	Streaming; digital download	Special Limited	Mars
China	September 14, 2012	Streaming	Standard	YDX
China	September 14, 2012	CD	Standard	GSM
China	October 26, 2012	CD+2DVD	Special Limited	GSM
Taiwan	September 14, 2012	CD	Standard	Warner
Taiwan	October 26, 2012	CD+2DVD	Special Limited	Warner
