= I Know You're Feeling Blue =

Single by Jolin Tsai

from the album 1019
- Language: Mandarin
- Released: September 1999
- Studio: Tong Lau (Hong Kong); Form (Singapore); Quad (New York)
- Genre: Pop
- Length: 4:24
- Label: Universal; D Sound
- Composer: Jimmy Ye
- Lyricist: Kiki Hu
- Producer: David Wu

Jolin Tsai singles chronology
"The Rose" (1999)	"I Know You're Feeling Blue" (1999)	"Don't Stop" (2000)

Music video
- "I Know You're Feeling Blue" on YouTube

"I Know You're Feeling Blue" (Chinese: 我知道你很難過; pinyin: Wǒ zhīdào nǐ hěn nánguò) is a song by Taiwanese singer Jolin Tsai, featured on her debut studio album 1019 (1999). It was written by Kiki Hu and Jimmy Ye, and produced by David Wu. It was issued in September 1999, by Universal as the second single from 1019.

== Background and release ==
On September 10, 1999, Tsai released her debut studio album 1019, along with the single "I Know You're Feeling Blue". The music video for the song was directed by Chou Ko-tai.

== Composition and recording ==
The song "I Know You're Feeling Blue" is a heartfelt ballad in which Tsai, despite being a new artist at the time, demonstrated an unexpectedly mature and refined vocal interpretation.

Lyricist Kiki Hu revealed that the song was originally written in collaboration with composer Jimmy Ye for Chinese singer Na Ying. However, since Na was not releasing music in Taiwan at the time, the song was sold by the publishing company to Universal.

Because the original lyrics conveyed a more mature tone, Universal wanted them adapted to better suit Tsai's age. As a result, a meeting was arranged between Hu and Tsai. Hu then rewrote the lyrics from the perspective of a young woman, framing the song as words of comfort shared between friends discussing romantic experiences.

Hu noted that early in her career, Tsai was known as a "Teenage Boy Killer", with a fan base largely consisting of male listeners. With the warmth and empathy in this song's lyrics, she was able to resonate with a broader female audience as well, helping to expand her fan base and establish a wider appeal.

== Commercial performance ==
The song was ranked number 30 on Taiwan's Hit FM Top 100 Singles of the Year in 1999.

== Personnel ==
- Greg Chen – production assistance
- Melody Liang – vocal coach
- Jeremy Lin – mixing engineering
- Premium Studio – mixing studio
- Keith Chan – keyboards, recording engineering
- Jun Kung – drums
- Aba – guitar
- Harold D – bass
- KY – recording engineering
- Helen – recording engineering assistance
- Tong Lau Studio – recording studio
- Peter Lee – vocal production
- Sean Chen – recording engineering
- Form Studio – recording studio
- Danny Madden – backing vocal arrangement
- Nicki Richards – backing vocals
- Audrey L. Wheeler – backing vocals
- Stephanie James – backing vocals
- Zhana – backing vocals
- Karen Bernod – backing vocals
- John James – backing vocals
- Steve Abrams – backing vocals
- Keith Fluitt – backing vocals
- Mike Anzel – recording engineering assistance
- James Warner – recording engineering assistance
- Quad Studios – recording studio

== Release history ==
Release dates and formats for "I Know You're Feeling Blue"
Region	Date	Format(s)	Distributor
Taiwan	September 1999	Radio airplay	Universal
