= 1019 (album) =

1999 studio album by Jolin Tsai

- Standard edition cover

Studio album by Jolin Tsai
- Released: September 10, 1999
- Genre: Pop
- Length: 42:59
- Labels: Universal; D Sound
- Producers: David Wu; Peter Lee; Paul Lee

Jolin Tsai chronology
1019 (1999)	Don't Stop (2000)

Singles from 1019
- 1. "The Rose" Released: September 1999; 2. "I Know You're Feeling Blue" Released: September 1999

1019 is the debut studio album by Taiwanese singer Jolin Tsai, released on September 10, 1999, by Universal. Produced by David Wu, Peter Lee, and Paul Lee, the album blends elements of pop, hip-hop, R&B, and world music. It was a commercial success, selling over 400,000 copies in Taiwan.

== Background ==
In May 1998, Tsai participated in a singing competition co-organized by MTV Mandarin and Sony. She won in the singing category with her performance of English songs. Fellow contestants in the same season included Maggie Chiang and A-Lin. Judge Wawa Chen described her as a "born singer", noting that she "sings with her natural talent", while judge Lee Cheng-fan remarked, "It would be a thrill to produce an album for her."

In March 1999, Tsai signed with Universal, becoming the label's key new artist of the year. The label arranged a six-month intensive training program for her, which included bi-weekly classes in dance, makeup, and languages, as well as trips to Ireland and the United States to watch live performances by international artists. Sam Chen of Universal stated that he decided to sign her immediately after watching her competition video. He recalled seeing Tsai, still in her school uniform, reading an English book backstage before changing into her performance outfit—a contrast in demeanor that convinced him of her star potential.

On July 16, 1999, Tsai released her debut single, "Living with the World", which served as the theme song for 7-Eleven Taiwan's annual advertising campaign. The track also acted as a preview of her upcoming debut studio album, scheduled for release that September.

== Writing and recording ==
The lead single, "The Rose", and the fifth single, "Good-Bye", were recorded at Quad Studios in New York City, featuring eight African-American backing vocalists to create a choral arrangement and sonic atmosphere reminiscent of a gospel choir. The second single, "I Know You're Feeling Blue", along with the fourth single, "Blame It on the Youth", and the sixth single, "Emptiness", are heartfelt ballads that reflect the mainstream sensibilities of the Mandarin pop market at the time. "Out on the Street", a hip-hop-infused track adapted from "A Song Story" by the Korean group Idol, adds rhythmic variety to the album. Meanwhile, songs such as "Who Are You" and "Living with the World" highlight Tsai’s versatility and her ability to interpret a diverse range of musical styles.

== Title and artwork ==
The album title 1019 carries symbolic meaning: the "10" is a homophonic reference to "Jolin" in Mandarin, while "19" represents Tsai’s age at the time of the release. The album centers around a fresh, shy, girl-next-door image, with the cover featuring a melancholic side-profile portrait of her. Her initial look for the album featured a white long dress, highlighting her 19-year-old persona as a studious, music-loving young woman. Later promotional visuals transitioned to midriff-baring outfits, projecting a healthy and lively style. According to Universal, Tsai embodies a striking duality—reserved and introverted offstage, yet exuding powerful stage presence when performing.

== Release and promotion ==
The original release of 1019 featured ten songs along with instrumental versions of two tracks. On September 11, 1999, Tsai held album launch events in Kaohsiung and Taichung, where a limited-edition was sold exclusively on-site. On October 15, 1999, Universal released a revised editionon to mark the album's milestone of surpassing 200,000 copies sold in Taiwan. This version included a single CD containing the ten songs, accompanied by a photo booklet, while the instrumental tracks were removed. On December 4, Tsai held the 1019 I Can concert in Taipei. Shortly after, on December 13, Universal released another revised edition, commemorating over 350,000 units sold. This edition featured six music videos and a behind-the-scenes short titled 1019 Universal Highlights. Finally, on January 15, 2000, the finally revised edition was launched, combining content from the previous editions into a comprehensive release.

=== Singles and music videos ===
Tsai released two singles from the album, "The Rose" and "I Know You’re Feeling Blue", both accompanied by music videos directed by Chou Ko-tai. Notably, "I Know You’re Feeling Blue" was ranked number 30 on Hit FM Top 100 Singles of 1999 in Taiwan. The music video for "Blame It on the Youth" was directed by Marlboro Lai and featured actor Lin Yo-wei. Meanwhile, the videos for "Good-Bye" and "Emptiness" were directed by Tony Lin.

== Critical reception ==
Tencent Entertainment's review noted that the album's ten tracks follow a conventional style, with "I Know You're Feeling Blue" successfully embodying Tsai's youthful girl-next-door image—filling a gap in Taiwan's Mandarin pop scene that lacked a local artist with this positioning. The album, centered around themes of youthful emotions, was produced by David Wu, Peter Lee, and Paul Lee, delivering a consistently solid quality.

Sina Hong Kong praised Tsai's vocal skills for their R&B influence, recognizing her as a strong vocalist. Although the album's style leans toward mainstream and lacks distinctive features, it remained competitive among Taiwanese debut releases that year.

== Accolades ==
Tsai received multiple accolades for this album, including the Favorite New Artist Bronze Award at the 1999 UFO People's Choice Awards, the Most Popular New Female Singer at the 6th China Music Awards, the Best New Artist Gold Award at the 7th Singapore Hit Awards, the Most Potential New Artist at the 1999 Top Music Chart Awards, and the Best New Artist Silver Award at the 2nd TVB8 Mandarin Music On Demand Awards. Additionally, the song "I Know You're Feeling Blue" won the UFO People's Choice Award for Most Played Song Award.

== Track listing ==
1019 – Standard / Special Commemorative edition (CD 1)
No.	Title	Lyrics	Music	Producer(s)	Length
1.	"Because of You"	Julian Yu	Anders Bagge; Arnthor Birgisson; Christian Karlsson; Patrick Tucker	Peter Lee	4:40
2.	"I Know You're Feeling Blue" (我知道你很難過)	Kiki Hu	Jimmy Ye	David Wu	4:24
3.	"Guessing" (猜想)	Daryl Yao	Ronan Keating; Stephen Gately; Shane Lynch; Keith Duffy; Martin Brannigan; Ray Hedges	David Wu	4:15
4.	"Who Are You" (你是誰)	Julian Yu	Jose Manuel Lopez Moles	David Wu	4:09
5.	"Living with the World" (和世界做鄰居)	Chuang Ching-wen	Ronald Ng	Peter Lee; Paul Lee	3:56
6.	"Out on the Street" (上街)	Mao Mao	Jun Young-hun	David Wu	3:49
7.	"Blame It on the Age" (怪我太年輕)	Eric Lin	Michael Tu	David Wu	4:44
8.	"Good-Bye"	Mao Mao; Joe Lai	Keith Chan	David Wu	4:46
9.	"Emptiness" (空白)	Chuang Ching-wen	Chervun Liew	Peter Lee	3:52
10.	"I Know You're Feeling Blue" (instrumental)				4:24
Total length:					42:59

1019 – Standard / Special Commemorative edition (CD 2)
No.	Title	Lyrics	Music	Producer(s)	Length
1.	"The Rose"	Amanda McBroom	Amanda McBroom	David Wu	4:20
2.	"The Rose" (instrumental)				4:20
Total length:					8:40

1019 – Celebration / Re-Celebration / Back-to-School Celebration / Reissue edition (CD)
No.	Title	Length
1.	"The Rose"	4:20
2.	"Because of You"	4:40
3.	"I Know You're Feeling Blue"	4:24
4.	"Guessing"	4:15
5.	"Who Are You"	4:09
6.	"Living with the World"	3:56
7.	"Out on the Street"	3:49
8.	"Blame It on the Age"	4:44
9.	"Good-Bye"	4:46
10.	"Emptiness"	3:52
Total length:		42:55

1019 – Re-Celebration / Back-to-School Celebration edition (VCD)
No.	Title	Length
1.	"I Know You're Feeling Blue" (music video)	5:10
2.	"The Rose" (music video)	5:05
3.	"Blame It on the Age" (music video)	4:44
4.	"Emptiness" (music video)	3:47
5.	"Living with the World" (music video)	3:53
6.	"Good-Bye" (music video)	4:41
7.	"1019 Universal Highlights"	10:02
Total length:		37:22

== Release history ==
Region	Date	Format(s)	Edition	Distributor
China	September 10, 1999	CD; cassette	Standard	Meika
Indonesia	September 10, 1999	Cassette	Standard	Universal
Malaysia	September 10, 1999	CD; cassette	Standard	Universal
Taiwan	September 10, 1999	2CD; 2 cassette	Standard	Universal
Taiwan	September 11, 1999	2CD	Special Commemorative	Universal
Taiwan	October 15, 1999	CD	Celebration	Universal
Taiwan	December 13, 1999	CD+VCD	Re-Celebration	Universal
Taiwan	January 15, 2000	CD+VCD	Back-to-School Celebration	Universal
Taiwan	March 25, 2005	CD	Reissue	Universal
