= Show Your Love (Jolin Tsai song) =

Single by Jolin Tsai

from the album Show Your Love
- Language: Mandarin
- Released: December 13, 2000
- Genre: Pop
- Length: 4:18
- Label: Universal; D Sound
- Composer: Paul Lee
- Lyricist: Chen Ching-nan
- Producer: Paul Lee

Jolin Tsai singles chronology
"Don't Stop" (2000)	"Show Your Love" (2000)	"Where the Dream Takes You" / "If Don't Want" (2001)

Music video
- "Show Your Love" on YouTube

"Show Your Love" is a song recorded by Taiwanese singer Jolin Tsai, featured on her third studio album Show Your Love (2000). The song was written by Chen Ching-nan, composed and produced by Paul Lee, and released as the album's lead single on December 13, 2000, by Universal.

== Background and release ==
On July 11, 2000, Tsai traveled to New York City to attend a two-month vocal training program at the Juilliard School. By November 24, 2000, media outlets reported that she had completed recording her new album. Subsequent reports confirmed that the album would be released on December 22, 2000. Prior to the album's release, the title track "Show Your Love" was issued as the lead single on December 13, 2000. The song also served as the Mandarin theme song for the 2000 film How the Grinch Stole Christmas.

== Composition and recording ==
"Show Your Love" is an upbeat pop track characterized by a lively, celebratory atmosphere. The recording features backing vocals from eight African-American singers, whose rhythmic harmonies and soulful delivery contributed to the song's dynamic sound and festive energy.

== Music video ==
The music video for "Show Your Love" premiered on December 12, 2000, across several major Taiwanese online platforms, including Kimo, PChome, Yam, Yahoo, and Sina. It was simultaneously screened in City Chain retail stores across Taiwan, displayed on a 100-inch LED screen mounted on the "Jolin Battle Bus" in northern Taiwan, at Mobitai outlets in central Taiwan, and on the outdoor screen of Hanshin Department Store in Kaohsiung.

Directed by Tony Lin, the video features Tsai and 14 dancers performing in a lively party setting. Tsai also performs aerial dance sequences suspended on wires, visually emphasizing the song's energetic and uplifting tone.

== Live performances ==
Tsai performed "Show Your Love" at the New Year's Eve Concert in Taipei on December 31, 2000. On March 22, 2001, she recorded a performance of the song for Fuji TV's Asia Super Live in Tokyo, which was broadcast on March 27, 2001. She later performed the song at the MTV Concert in Taipei on June 9, 2001.

== Release history ==
Release dates and formats for "Show Your Love"
Region	Date	Format(s)	Distributor
Taiwan	December 13, 2000	Radio airplay	Universal
