= Jimmy Ye =

Singaporean singer-songwriter (born 1967)

Jimmy Ye Liang Jun
- Born: 1967 (age 58–59)
- Occupations: Singer; songwriter
- Years active: 1993–1998; 2015–present

Chinese name
- Traditional Chinese: 葉良俊
- Simplified Chinese: 叶良俊
Transcriptions
Standard Mandarin
- Hanyu Pinyin: Yè Liángjùn
- Musical career
- Genre: Mandopop
- Instrument: Vocals

Jimmy Ye Liang Jun (born 1967) is a Singaporean former singer and a director at Singapore Management University (SMU).

Liang Jun is a former lecturer in Law who left the legal profession for a music career. He is also currently Director and SMU Office of Student Life while still active as a performer and creative director for big events such as Sing.浪. He has written songs for artists of the Chinese music scene, including Jackie Cheung, Andy Lau, Anita Mui, Leslie Cheung, Jeff Chang, Jolin Tsai, Alan Tam and Kit Chan.

== Singing career ==
Ye started his singing career as a freelance singer, performing at Singapore Tourism Board and private functions.

In 1992, Ye signed with Sony Music and released his first album, Give Me Your Love, which he wrote three of the tracks.

In 1996, Ye with Liang Wern Fook, created a Mandarin musical, December Rains, with George Chan and Kit Chan as the main leads.

In 1997, Ye became a songwriter after five years as a singer. He was also approached by Television Corporation of Singapore to write songs for its actors. He had also wrote songs for various singers, such as "Xiao Wan Yi" (小玩意) for Cass Phang, the second title track "Tai Xiang Ai Ni" (太想爱你) for Jeff Chang's album Dreams and also the main two title tracks song "Want to Feel the Breeze With You" (想和你去吹吹风) and "Three Days Two Nights" (三天两夜) for Jacky Cheung's album Want to Feel the Breeze With You.

In 1998, Ye retired from the music scene.

In 2015, Ye held his first solo concert at the Esplanade. He also wrote a new single "How Are You" for the concert.

On 6 February 2021, as part of the AL!VE series, Ye performed a solo concert at Capitol Theatre of the Capitol Singapore.

In 2022, Ye adapted December Rains to a concert, December Rains The Concert and performed in it also.

== Academic career ==
Ye was initially a law lecturer at the National University of Singapore but became a freelance singer.

In 2000, Ye joined Singapore Polytechnic as part of the founding team of lecturers for its Diploma in Music and Audio Technology. He subsequently joined SMU and became Director of Student Life.

== Discography ==
=== Studio albums ===
Title	Album details	Ref
Give Me Your Love (把你的愛交給我)	Released: 1993; Label: Sony Music	
Truly (最真)	Released: 1994; Label: Sony Music	
Zhui xin (追心)	Released: 1995; Label: Sony Music	
Wo zong shi ting ni shuo (我總是聽你說)	Released: 1996; Label: EMI Taiwan	
Be Willing To Part With (捨得)	Released: 1997; Label: EMI Taiwan	

=== Singles ===
Title	Year	Album
"How are you" (你还好吗？)	2015	Non-album single

=== Songwriting credits ===
Year	Credit	Title	Artist	Album
1995	Lyricist	"一份真"	Mavis Hee	Regret (遗憾)
1995	Lyricist	"我要"	Zheng Zhan Lun	
1995	Lyricist	"小玩意"	Cass Phang	Outside The Window (窗外)
1995	Lyricist	“有心无力”	Andy Lau	A Bird Searching for Love (情未鸟)
1996	Lyricist	"給我一些時間"	Amy Chan	女人背後
1996	Lyricist	"I Want To Fly" (我要先飛)	Edmond Leung	Breathe
1996	Lyricist	"体谅"	Ng King Kang (吴庆康)	吊起来卖
1996	Lyricist	"太想愛你"	Jeff Chang	Dreams
