= Peter Lee (musician) =

Singaporean singer, songwriter, and record producer

Lee Shih Shiong
- Born: 24 July 1966 (age 60); Singapore
- Occupations: Musician, composer, record producer
- Years active: 1984–present
- Family: Lee Wei Shiong
- Awards: Star Awards 2001: Special Achievement AwardGolden Melody Awards – Best Composition; 2001 Cloudy Day

Chinese name
Transcriptions
Standard Mandarin
- Hanyu Pinyin: Lǐ Sīsōng
Yue: Cantonese
- Jyutping: lei5 si1 sung1
- Musical career
- Genre: Pop
- Instrument: Piano

Peter Lee Shih Shiong (Chinese: 李偲菘; pinyin: Lǐ Sīsōng; born 24 July 1966) is a Singaporean musician, composer, and record producer. In 2001, Lee won a Golden Melody Award for Best Composition for his work, "Cloudy Day", performed by his apprentice Stefanie Sun.

== Musical career ==
In 2006, Lee, with his brother, opened the Lee Wei Song Music School in Shanghai. They opened another branch in Beijing in 2010.

== Personal life ==
Lee has a twin brother, Lee Wei Shiong.

== Awards and nominations ==
Year	Award	Result
2001	Special Achievement Award	Won
