= List of songs recorded by Jolin Tsai =

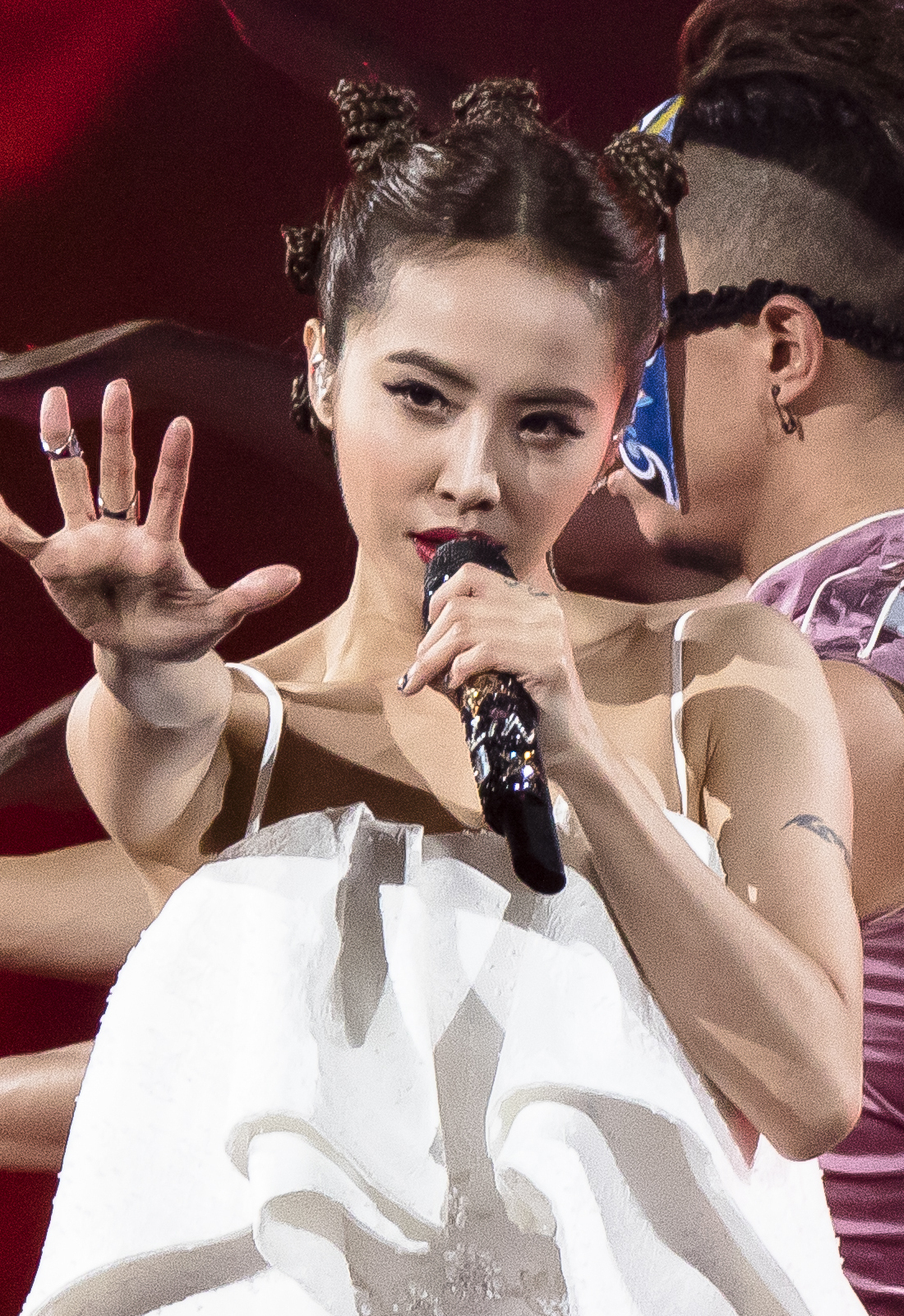
Tsai performing at the 10th KKBox Music Awards in Taipei, February 2015

Taiwanese singer Jolin Tsai has recorded 222 songs across 16 studio albums, 7 live albums, and 11 compilation albums to date. She released her debut studio album 1019 in 1999. Following this, she released a series of successful albums, including Dancing Diva (2006), Muse (2012), Play (2014), and Ugly Beauty (2018), all of which have won Golden Melody Awards. She has also released a number of hit songs, including tracks that ranked in the top 10 of the Hit FM Top 100 Singles in Taiwan, such as "Say Love You", "It's Love", "Sky", "Pretence", "Marry Me Today", "Sun Will Never Set", "I Won't Last a Day Without You", "Butterfly", "Honey Trap", "The Great Artist", "Play", "The Third Person and I", "Ugly Beauty", "Stars Align", and "Pleasure".

Tsai has also been involved in the writing of several songs, including "The Spirit of Knight", "The Starter", "Repeated Note", "The Prologue", "Beast", "I'm Not Yours", "Womxnly", "Sweet Guilty Pleasure", and "DIY". In addition, Tsai has recorded songs for several films and television series, including the theme songs for Atlantis: The Lost Empire ("Where the Dream Takes You"), Why Me, Sweetie?! ("Angel of Love"), Warriors of Heaven and Earth ("Warriors in Peace"), Tiny Times 3 ("Kaleidoscope"), On Happiness Road ("On Happiness Road"), Monster Hunt 2 ("Stand Up"), The Wolf ("Who Am I"), Marry My Dead Body ("Untitled"), and the web series At the Moment ("Someday, Somewhere").

== Songs ==
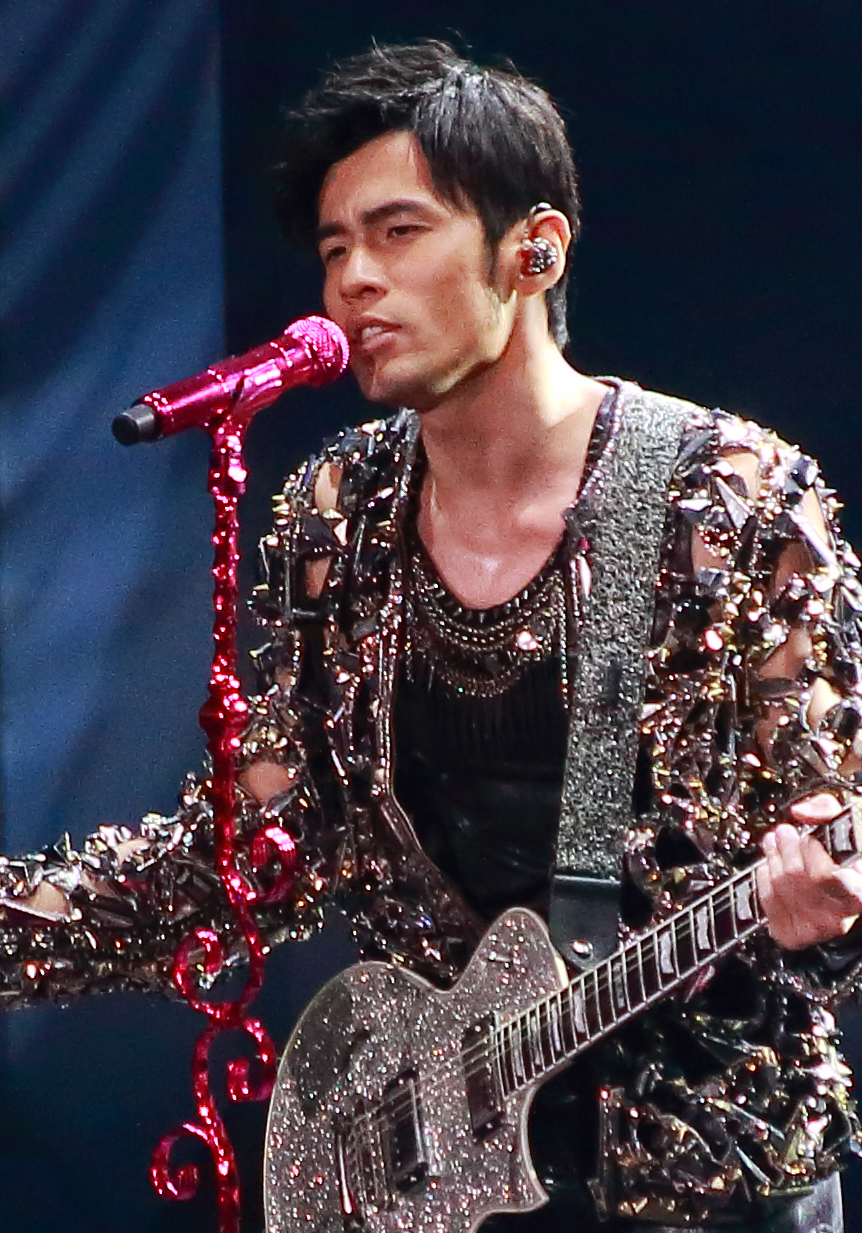
Jay Chou co-wrote "Can't Speak Clearly" from Lucky Number, "The Spirit of Knight", "Say Love You", and "Prague Square" from Magic, "Pirates", "It's Love", and "Rewind" from Castle, and he provided background vocals for "The Spirit of Knight", "Prague Square", and "Pirates".

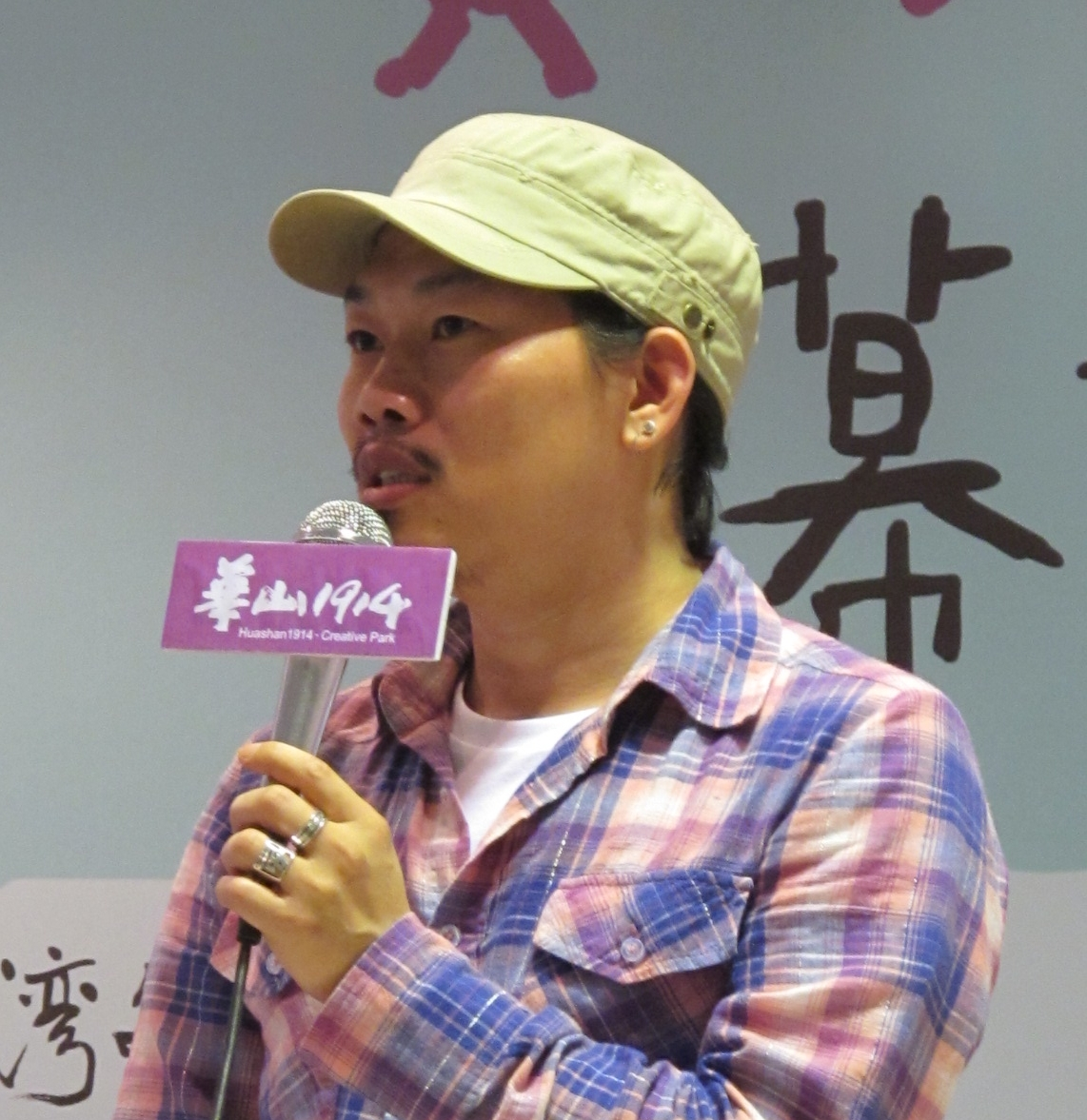
Vincent Fang co-wrote "Prague Square" and "Smell of the Popcorn" from Magic, "Rewind" from Castle, "Love in the Shape of a Heart" from Dancing Diva, "Heartbeat of Taiwan", "Shake Your Body", and "Be Wonderful Together".

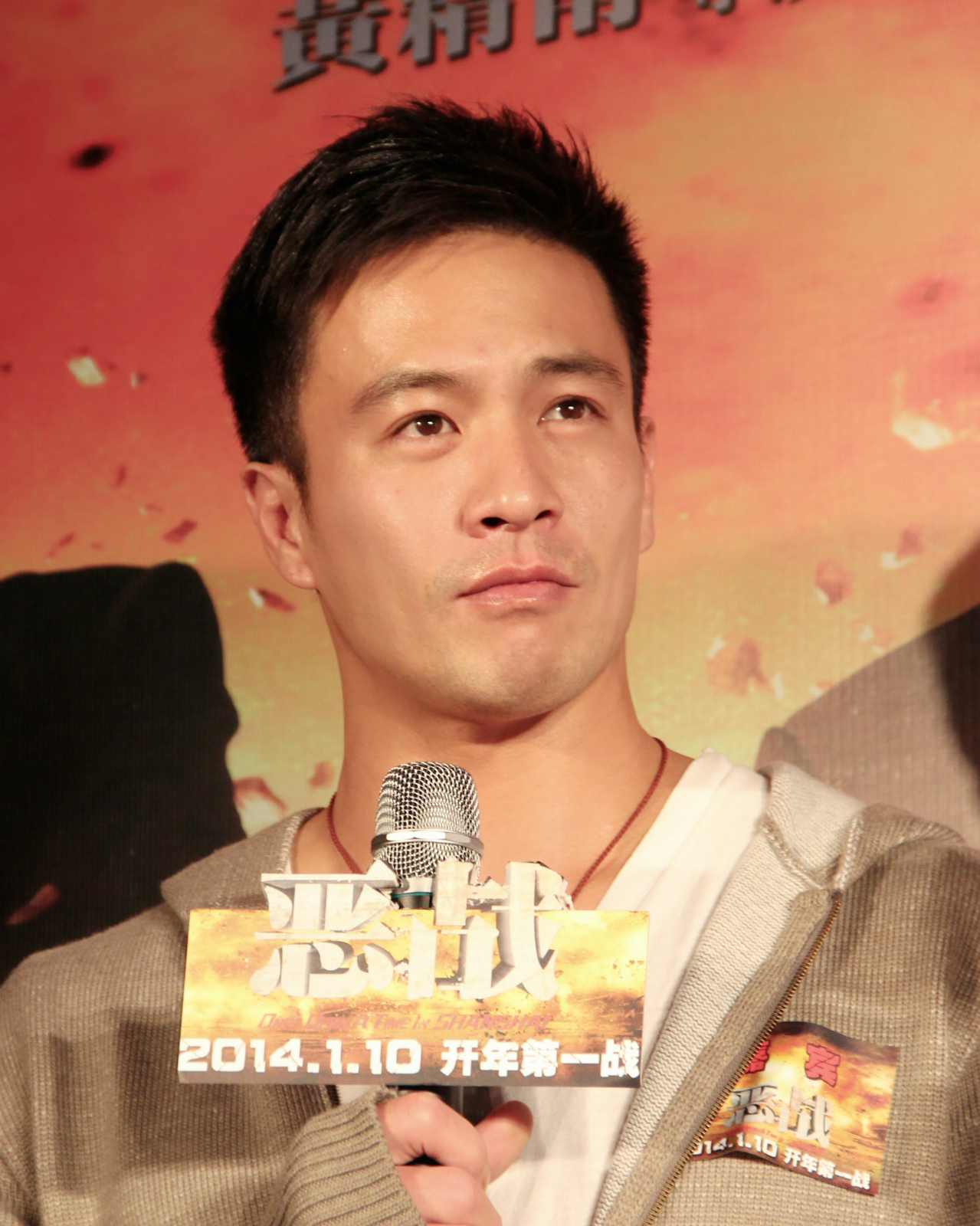
Tsai duetted with Andy On on "Angel of Love".

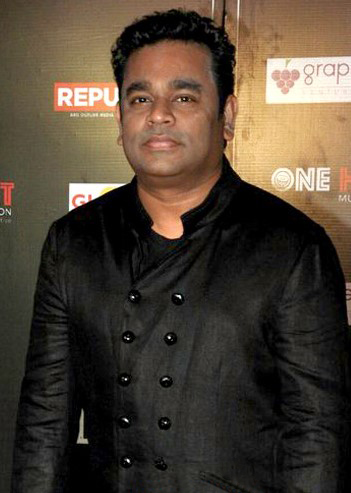
A. R. Rahman co-wrote "Warriors in Peace".

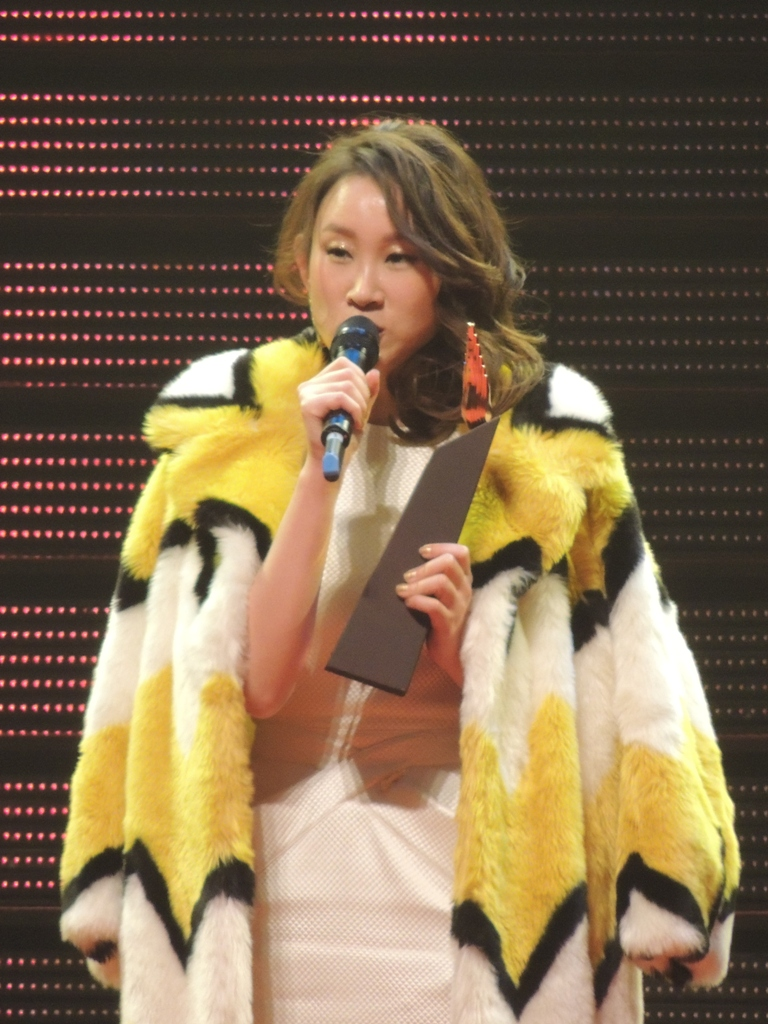
Ivana Wong co-wrote "Greek Girl by the Wishing Pond" from J-Game.

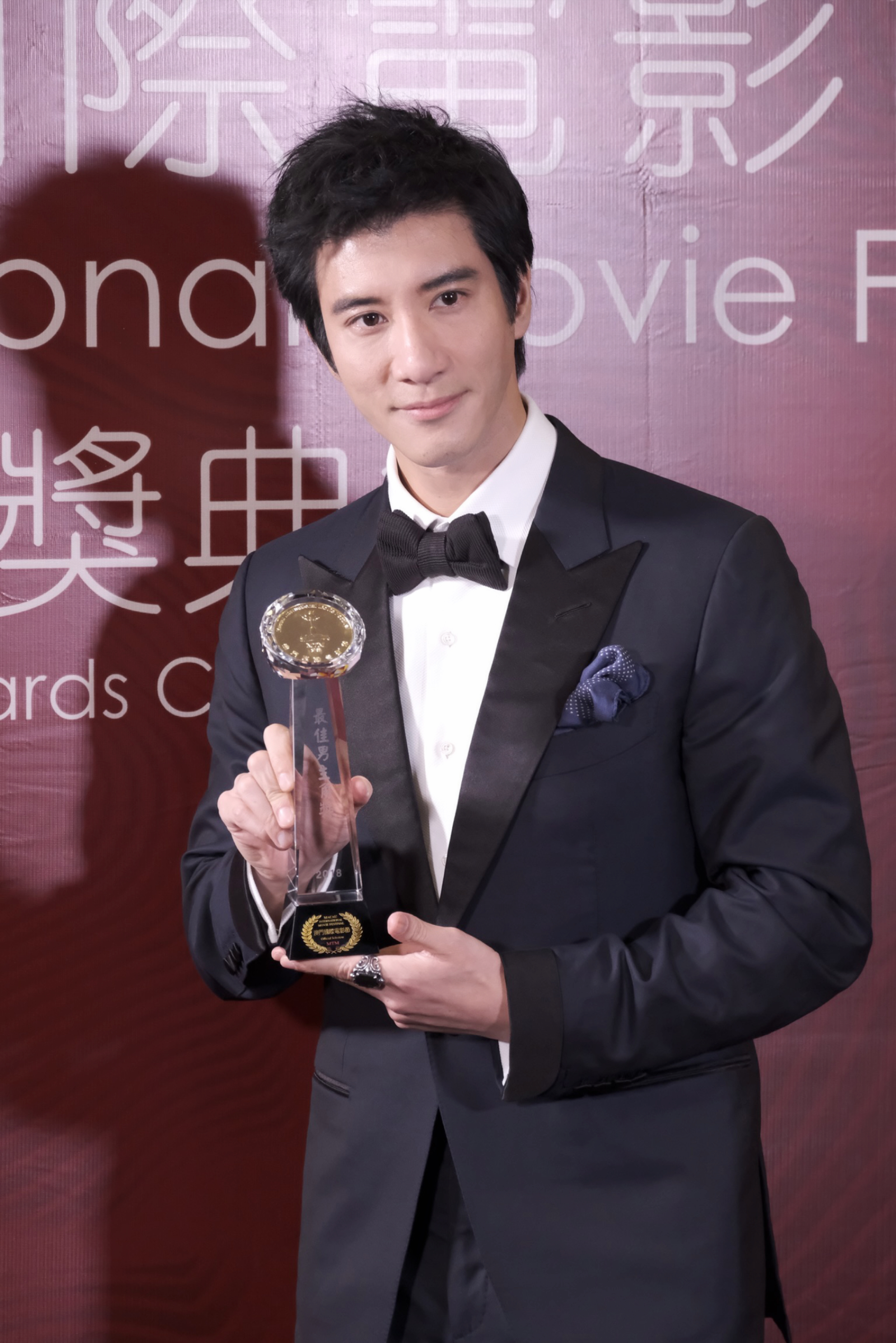
Wang Leehom co-wrote "Exclusive Myth" from J-Game.

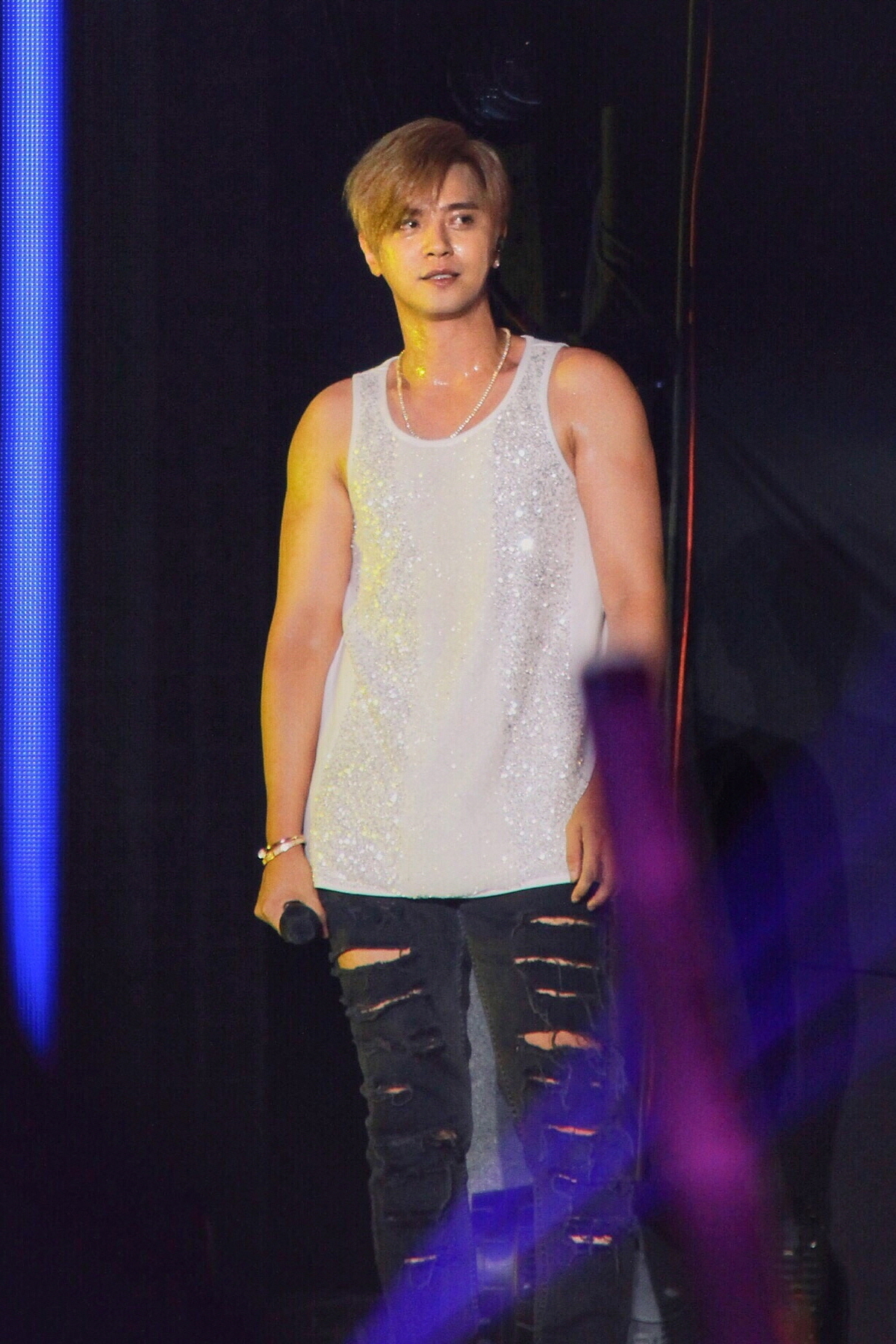
Tsai appeared as a featured artist on Show Lo's song "Destined Guy" from Lo's album, Hypnosis Show.

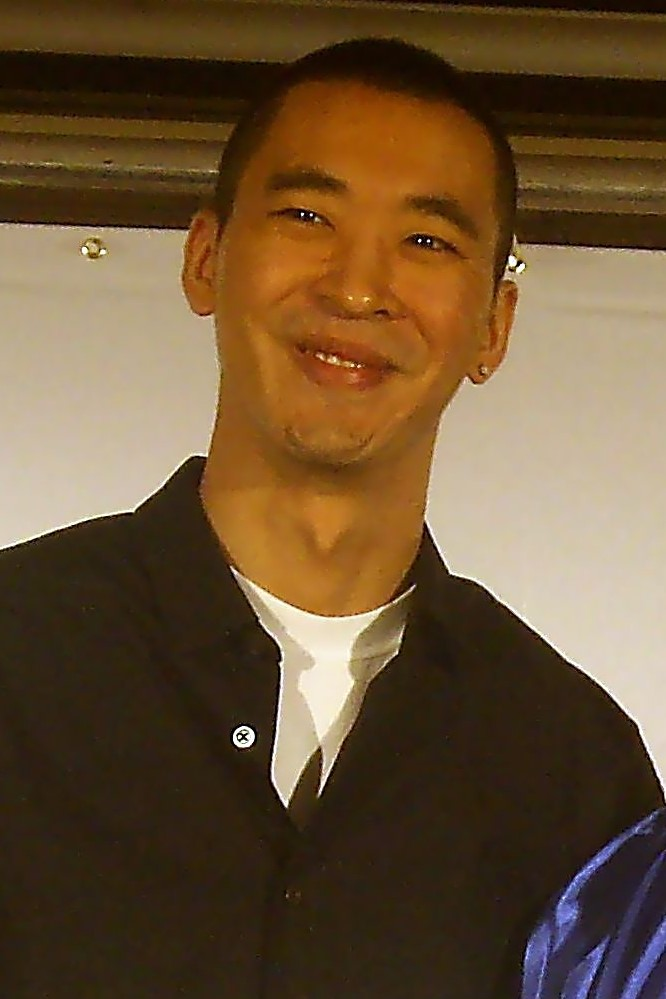
Stanley Huang was featured on "Nice Guy" from Dancing Diva.

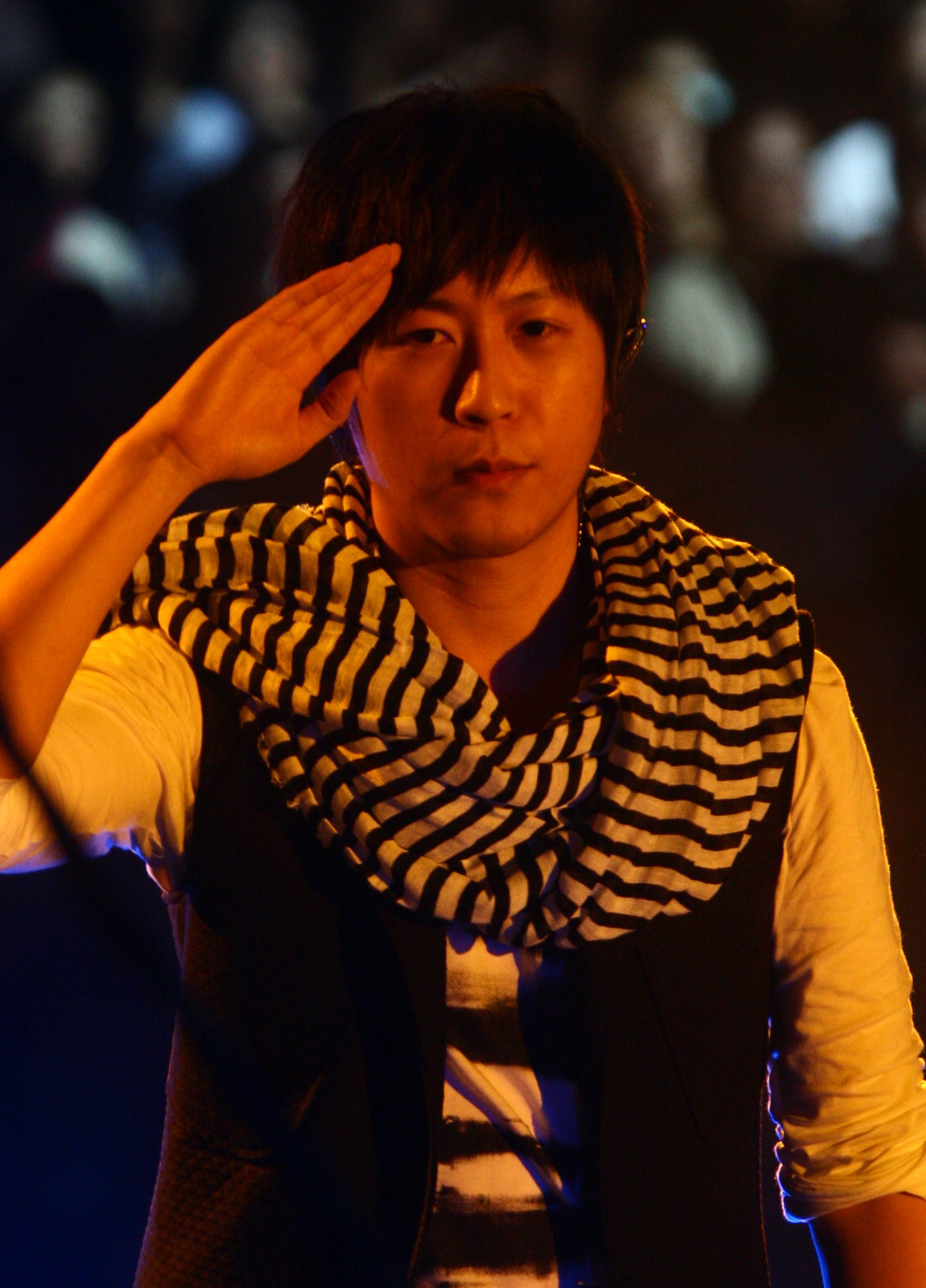
Ashin co-wrote "The Finale" from Dancing Diva and "Womxnly" from Ugly Beauty.

Tsai duetted with David Tao on "Marry Me Today" from his album, Beautiful.

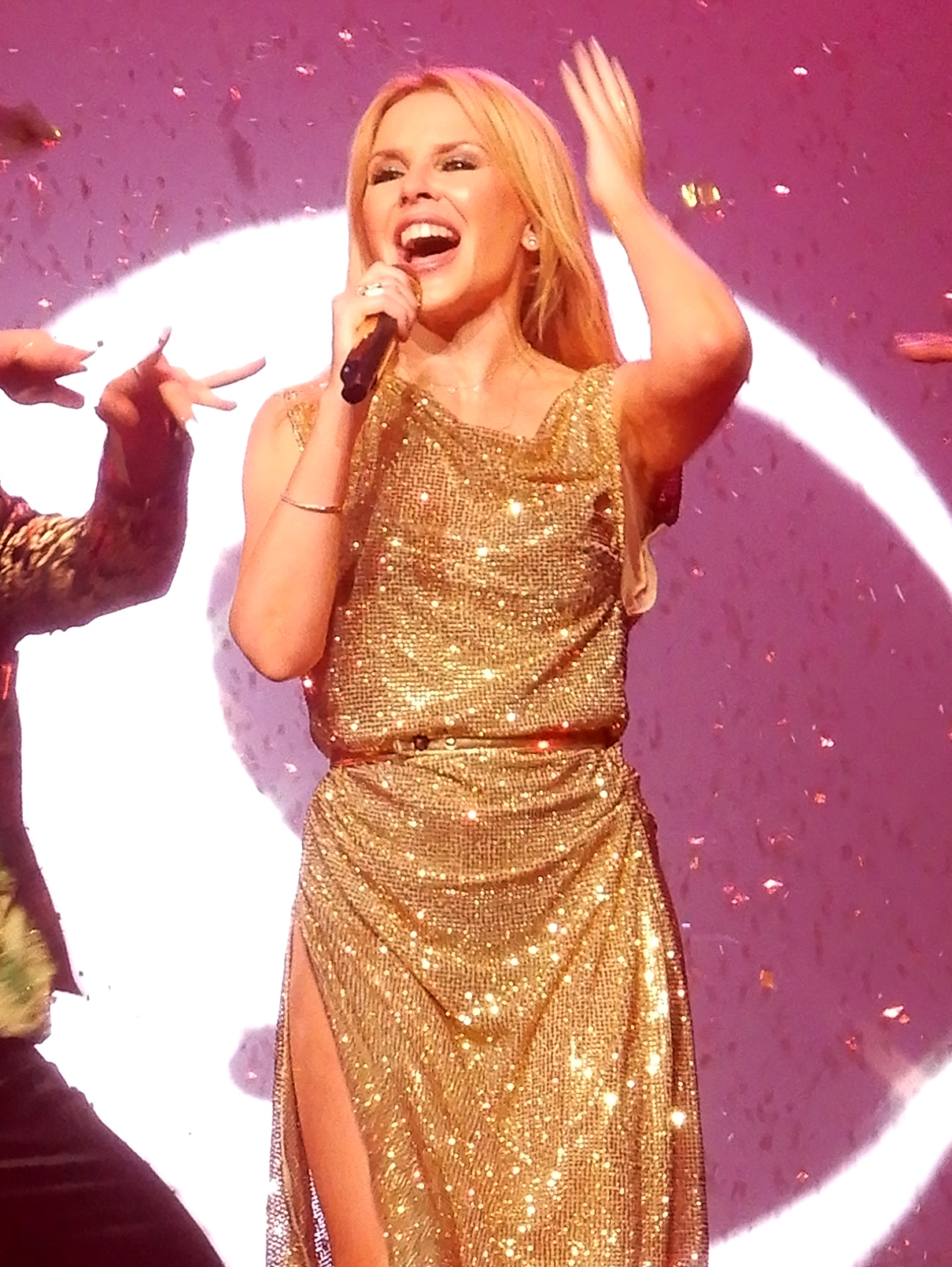
Tsai appeared as a featured artist on Kylie Minogue's song "In My Arms" from the Asia special edition of Minogue's album, X.

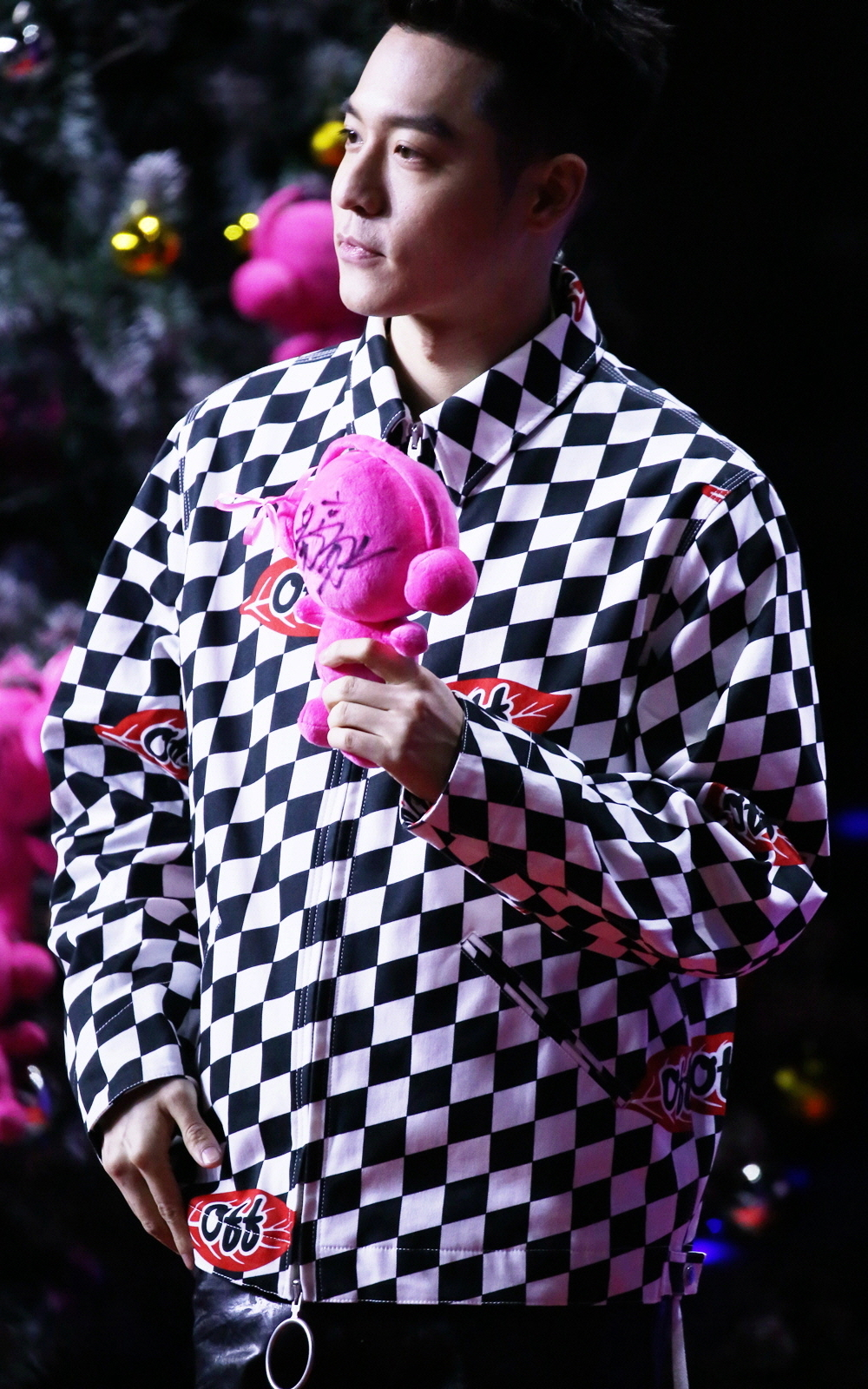
Nick Chou appeared as a featured artist on "Real Man" from Butterfly.

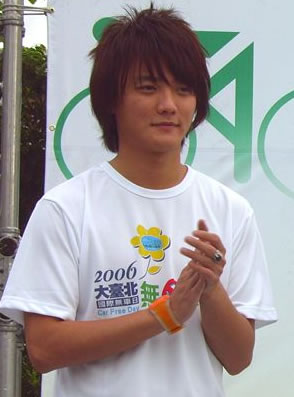
Real Huang co-wrote "Compromise" from Butterfly and "Kaleidoscope".

Tan Vui Chuan co-wrote "You Hurt My Feelings" from Butterfly and "Let's Break Up" from Myself.

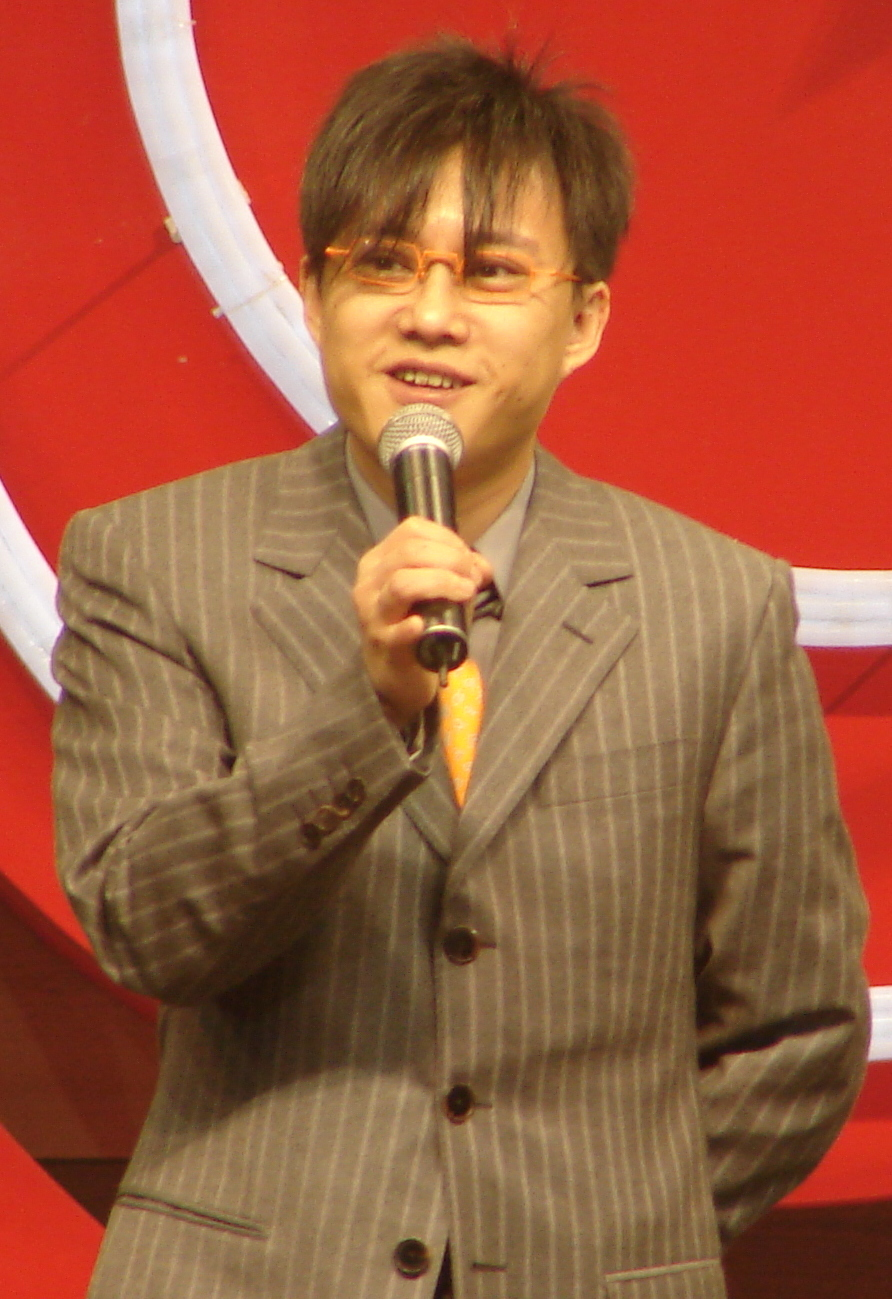
Albert Leung co-wrote "You Hurt My Feelings" from Butterfly and "We're All Different, Yet the Same" from Play.

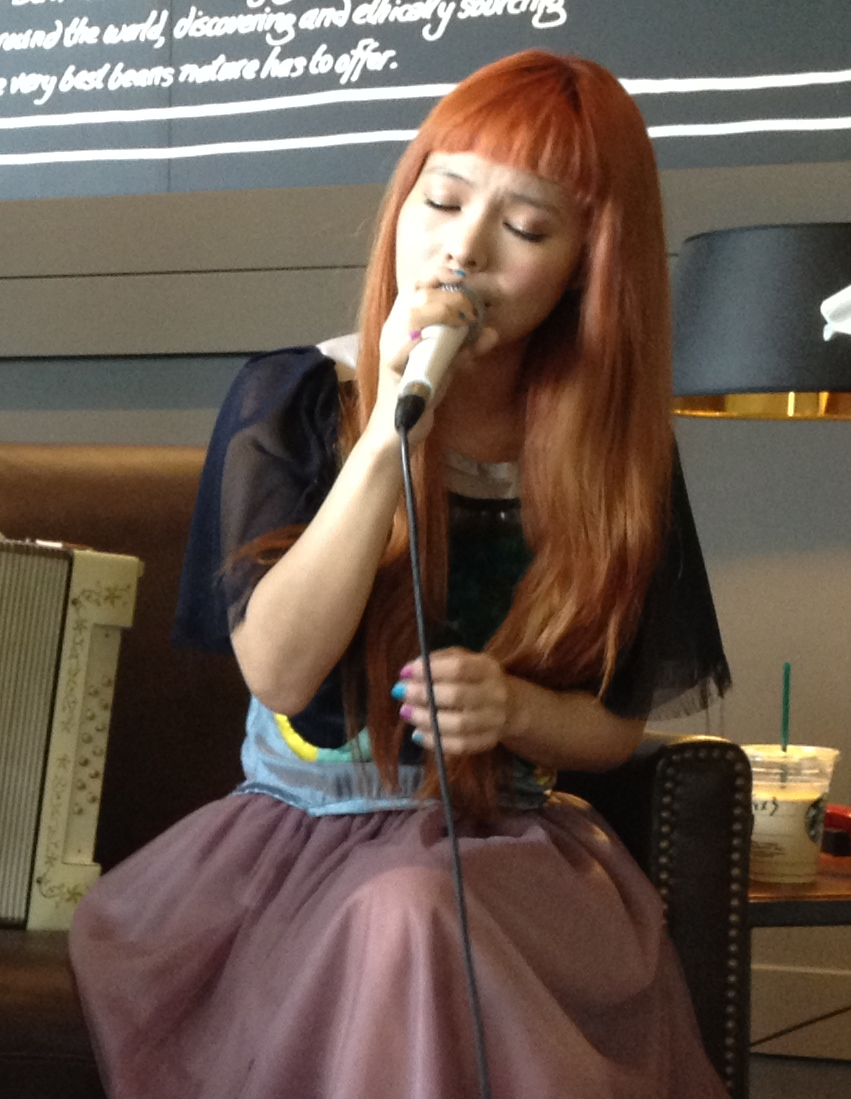
Peggy Hsu co-wrote "Dr. Jolin" and "Wandering Poet" from Muse.

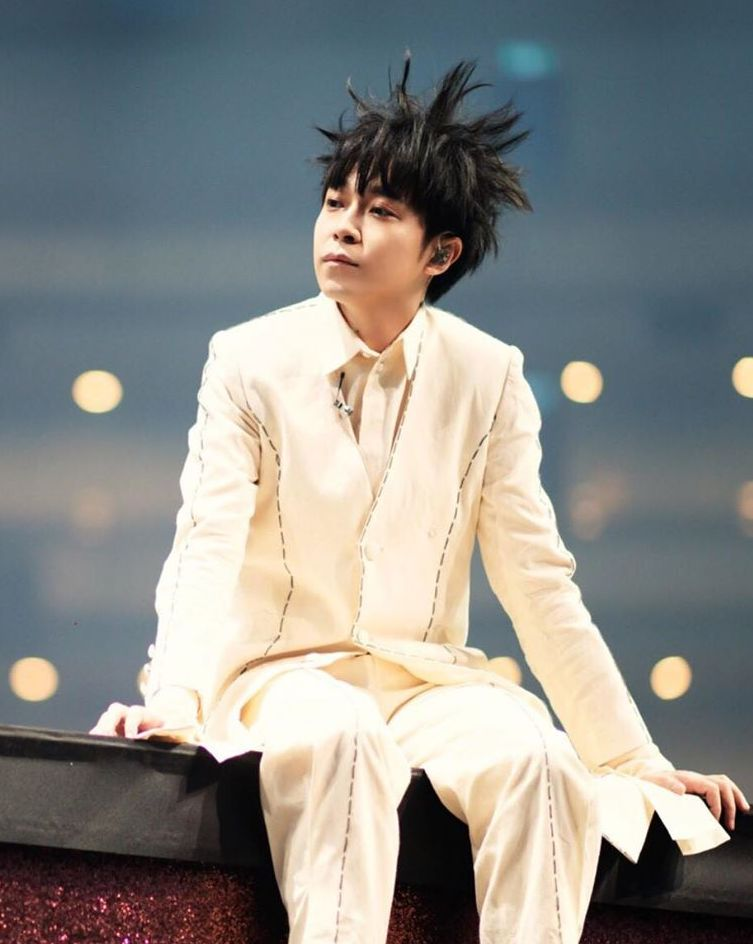
Greeny Wu co-wrote "Fantasy", "Spying on You Behind the Fence", and "Color Photos" from Muse and "Ugly Beauty" from Ugly Beauty.

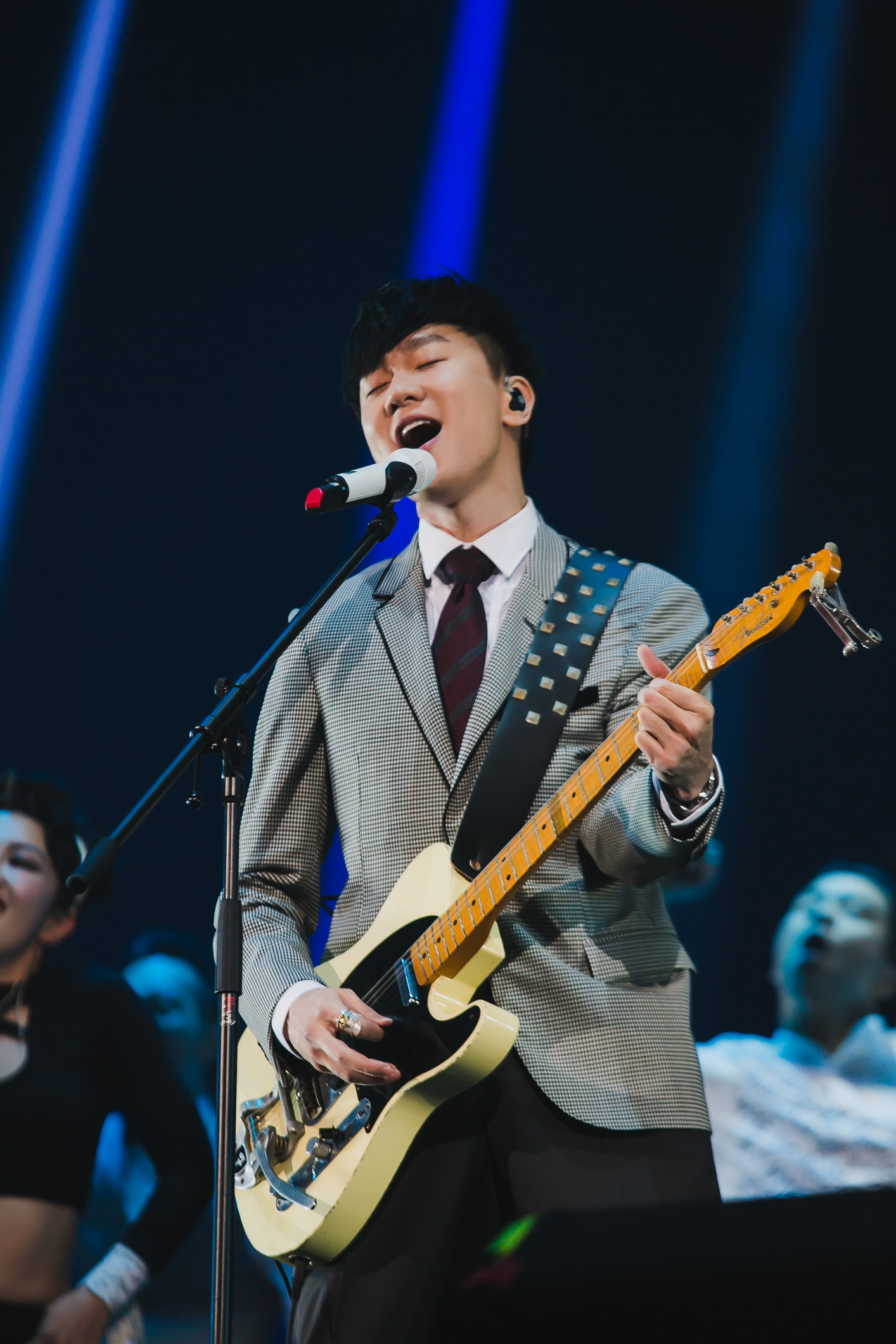
JJ Lin co-wrote "Mosaic" from Muse and "The Third Person and I" from Play.

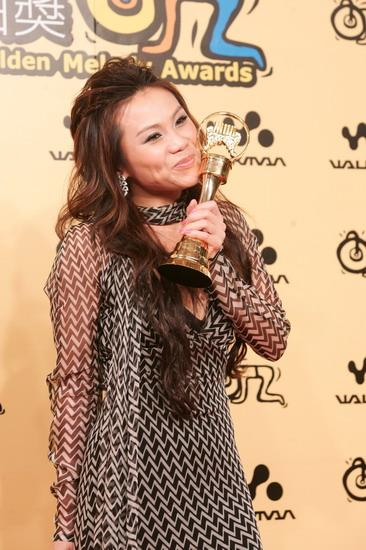
Tanya Chua co-wrote "I" from Muse.

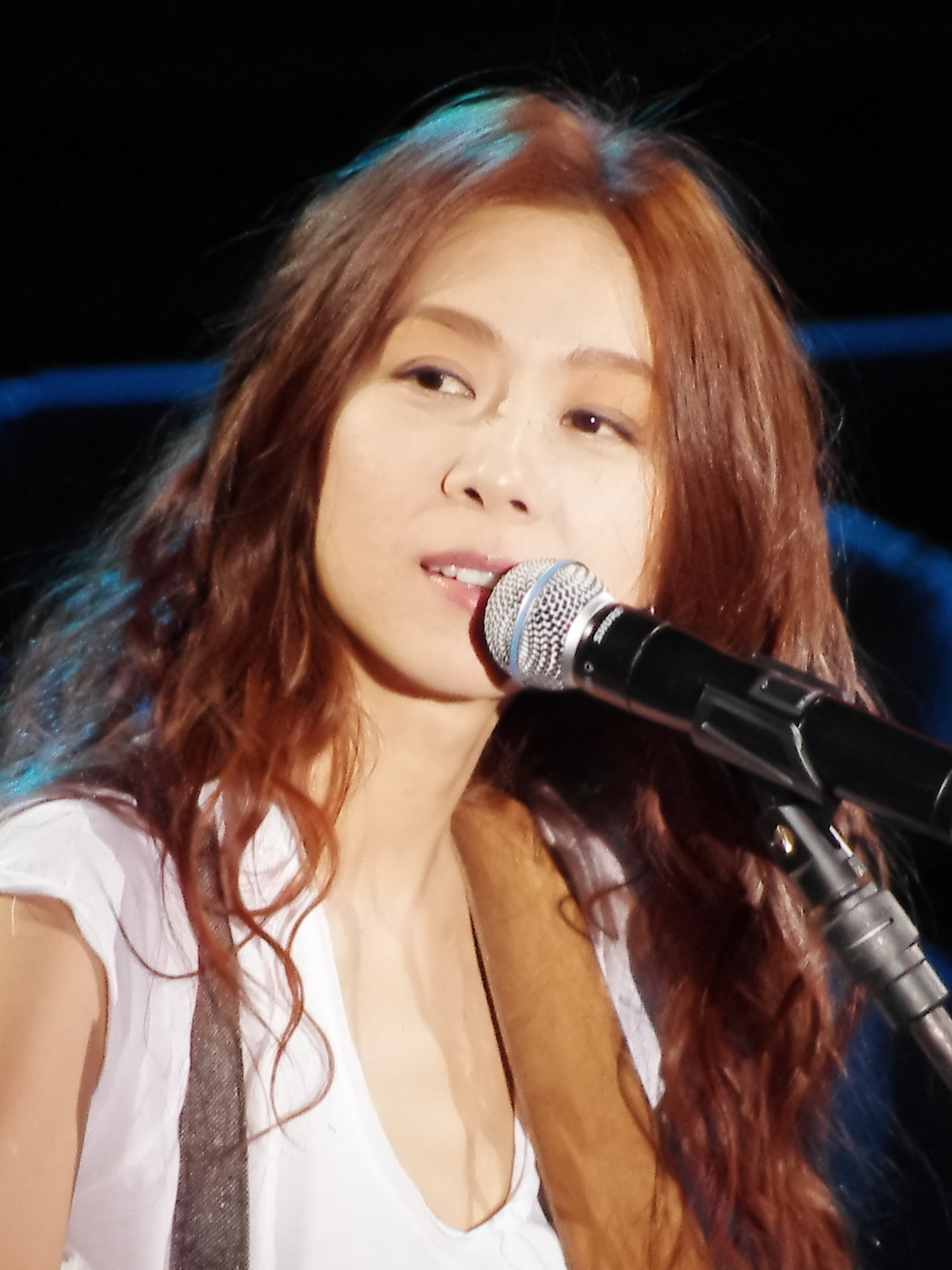
Cheer Chen wrote "Gentlewomen" from Play.

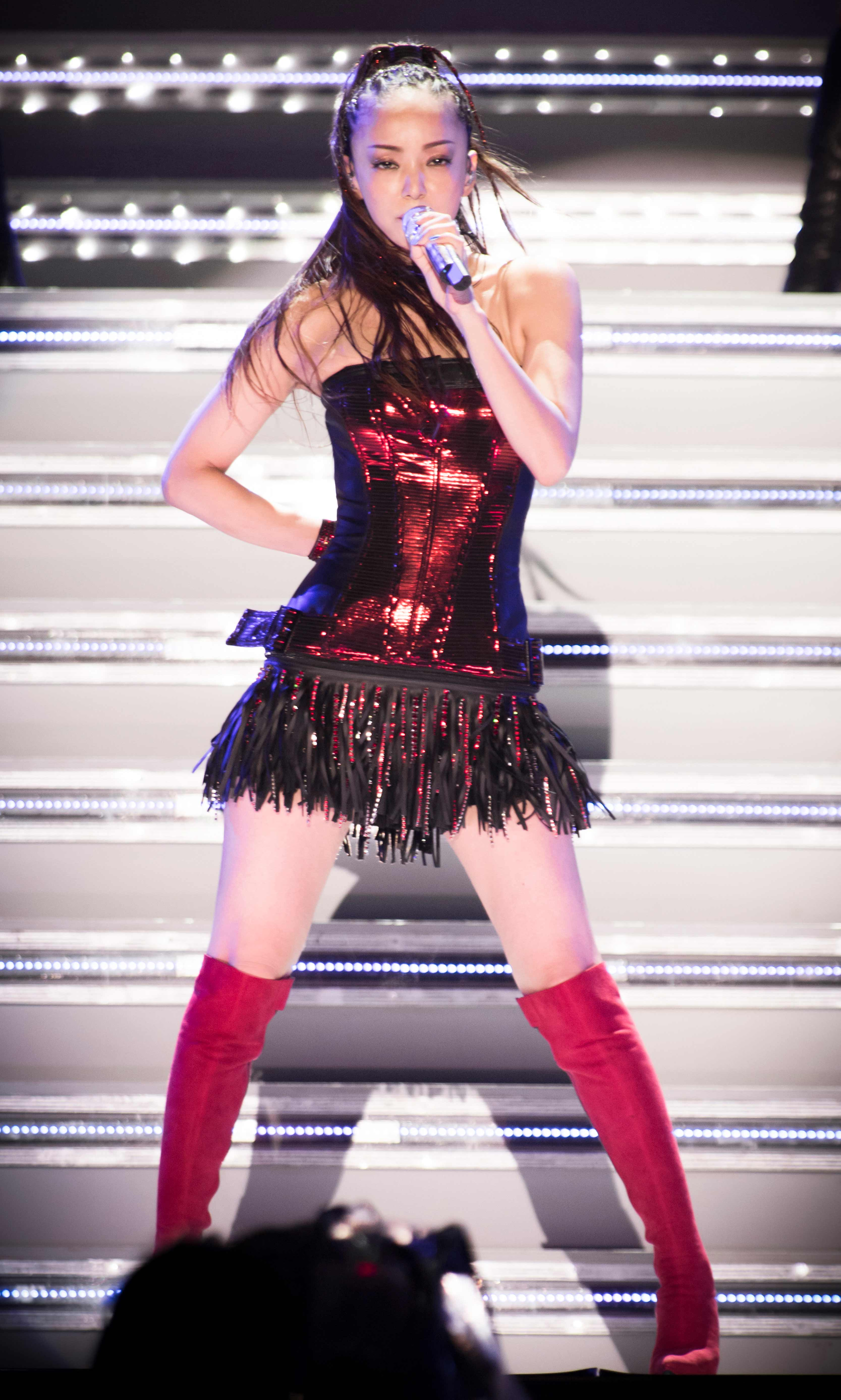
Namie Amuro appeared as a featured artist on "I'm Not Yours" from Play.

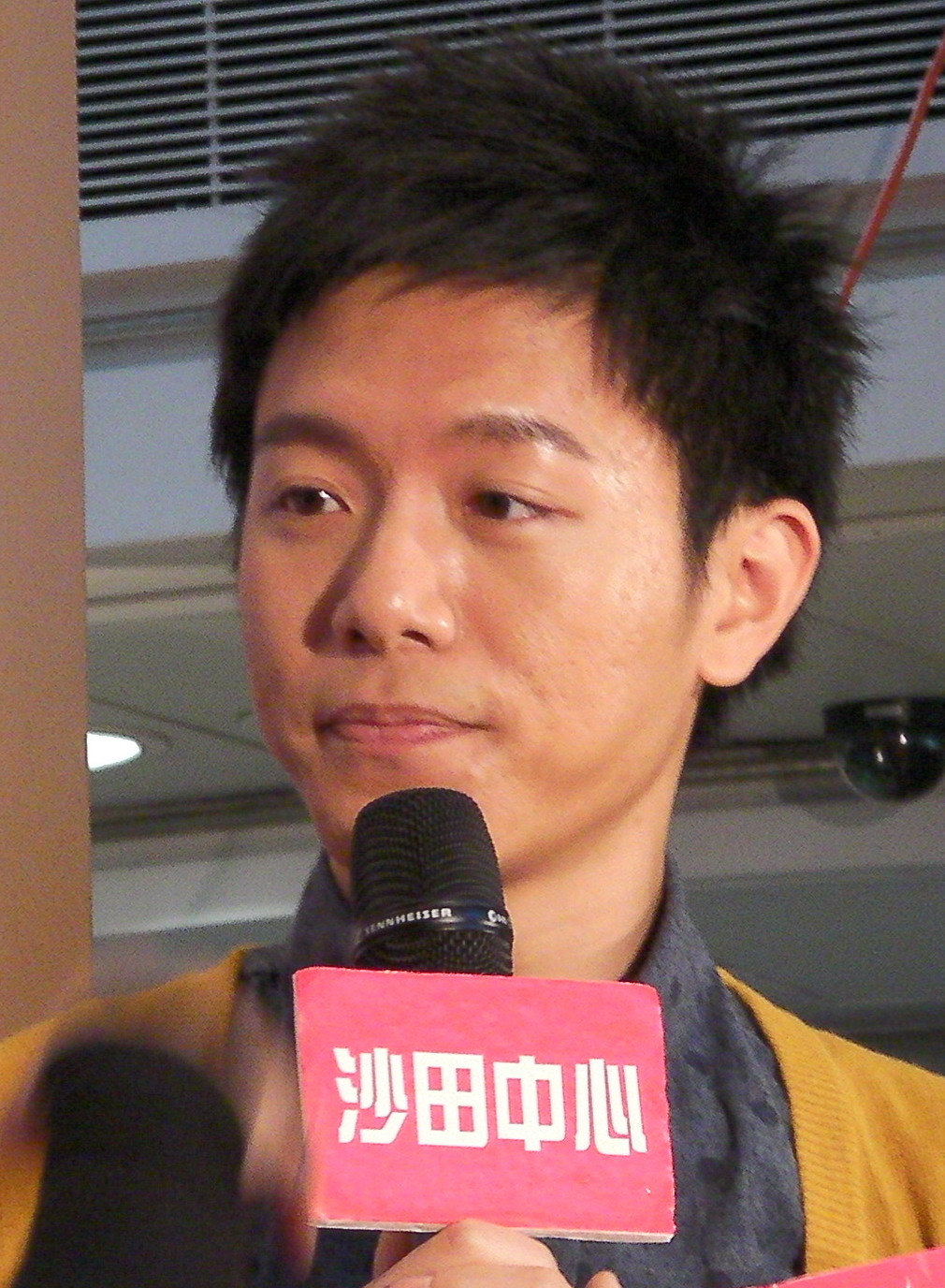
William Wei co-wrote "I Love, I Embrace" from Play.

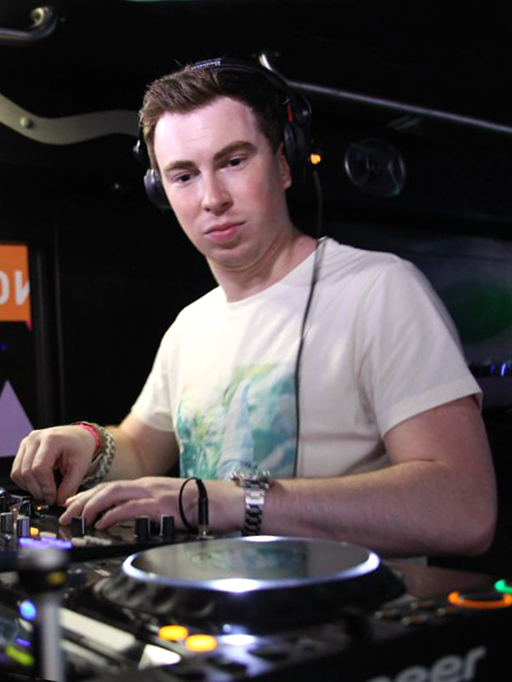
Hardwell co-wrote "We Are One".

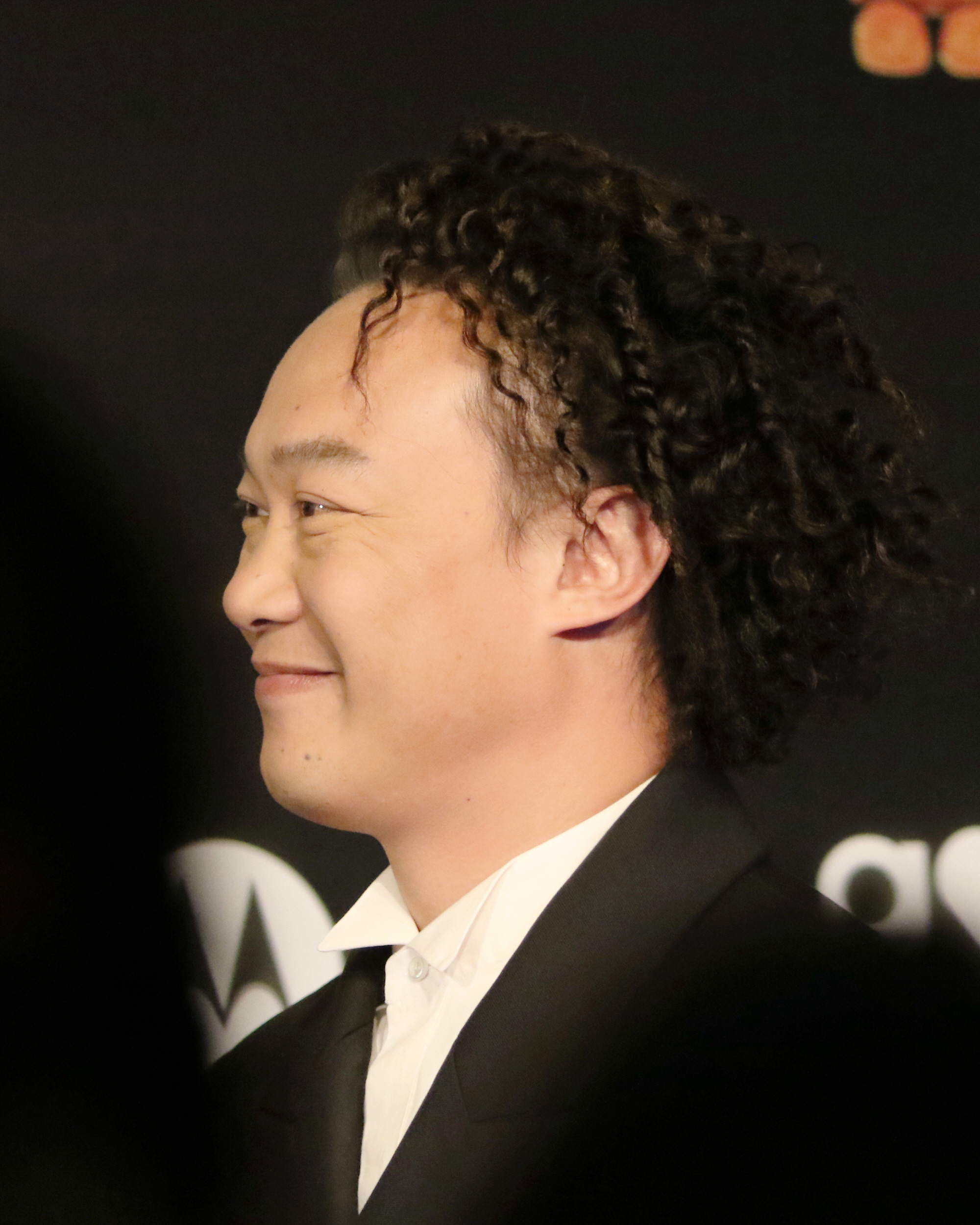
Tsai duetted with Eason Chan on "Fight as One".

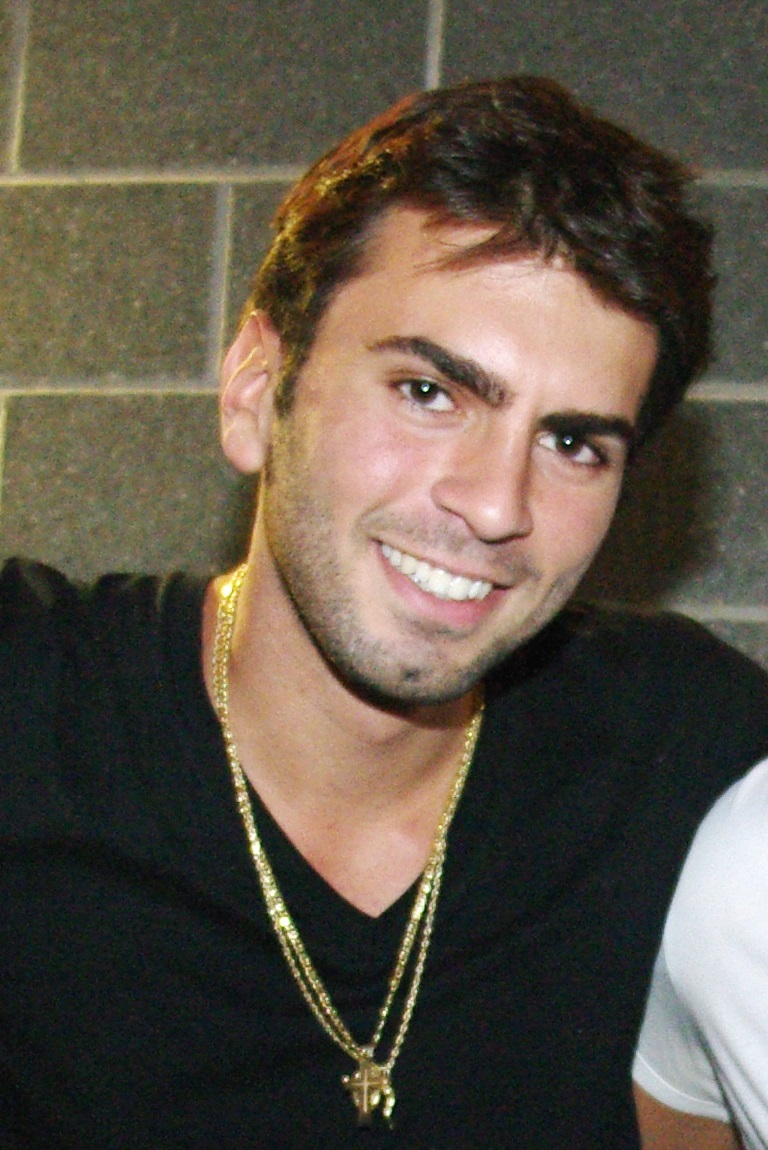
R3hab co-wrote "Stars Align".

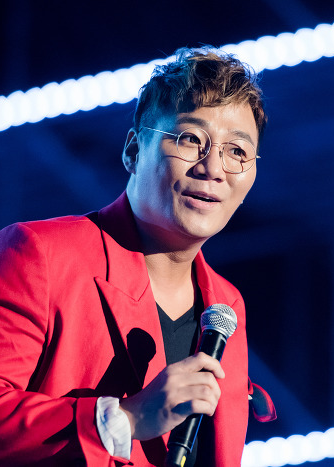
Maurice Yoon co-wrote "Who Am I".

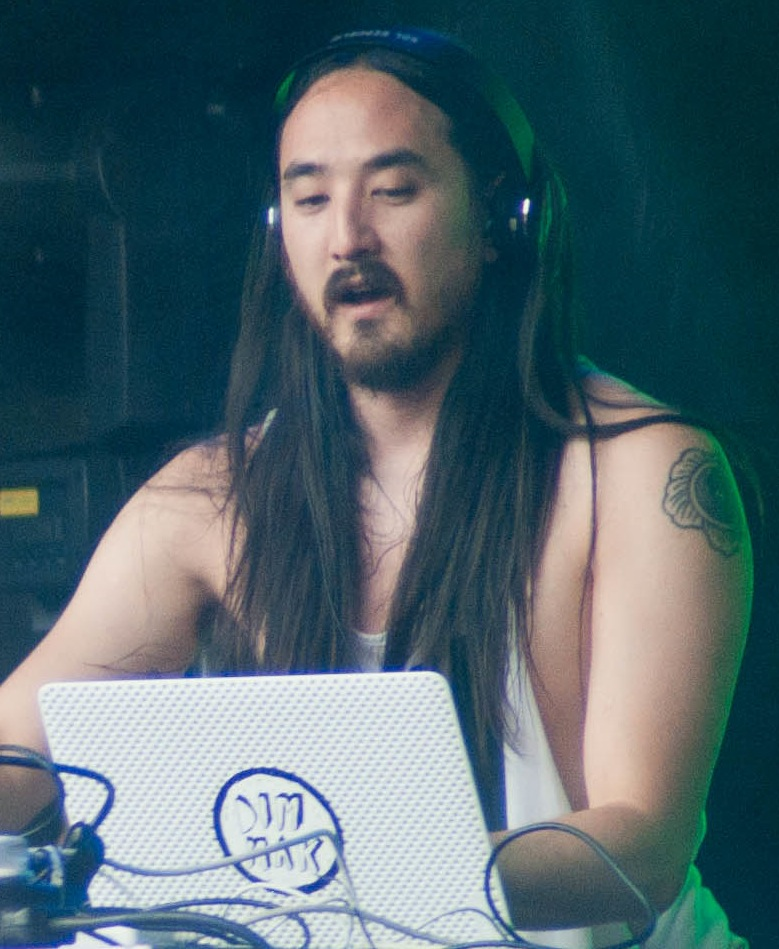
Steve Aoki co-wrote "Equal in the Darkness".

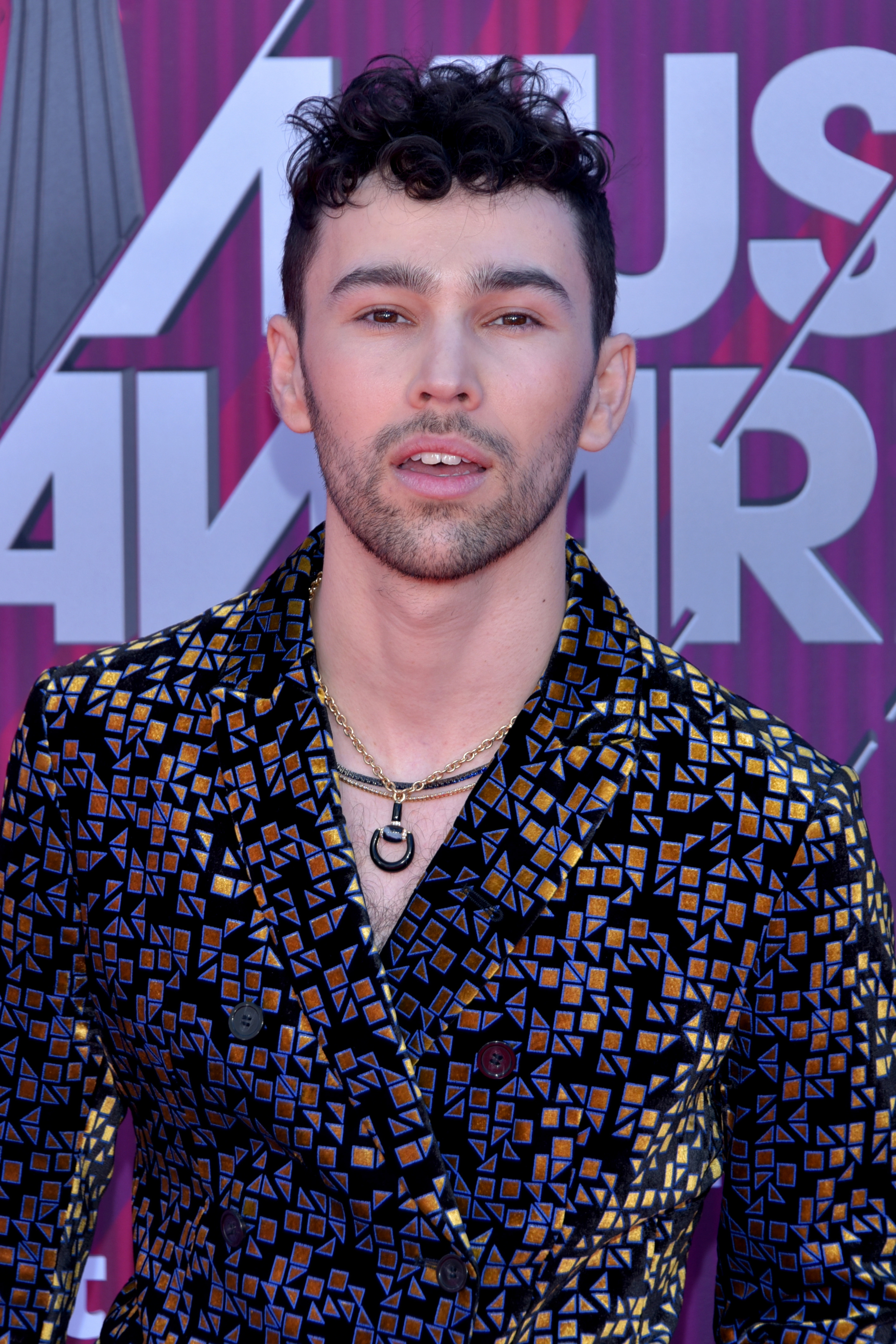
Tsai duetted with MAX on "Equal in the Darkness".

Tsai recorded with SB19 on "Emoji" from SB19's album, Wakas at Simula.

Key
‡	Indicates songs written by Jolin Tsai
†	Indicates songs covered by Jolin Tsai

Song	Writer(s)	Album	Year
"36 Tricks of Love"	Savan Kotecha; Andrew Frampton; Wayne Wilkins; Kiki Hu	Castle	2004
"A Wonder in Madrid"	Hagen Troy; Alang Huang	Dancing Diva	2006
"Accompany with Me"	Yi Jet Qi; Daryl Yao	Butterfly	2009
"Agent J"	Ooi Teng Fong; Sunny Lee; Matthew Yen; Neoh Kim Hin	Agent J	2007
"Alone"	Eric Ng; Al Kuan	Agent J	2007
"Angel of Love" with Andy On	Peter Kam; Andrew Ling	Why Me, Sweetie?! Original Sound Track	2003
"Angel" †	Sarah McLachlan	Love Exercise	2008
"Are You Happy"	Michael Tu; Kiki Hu	Don't Stop	2000
"Attraction of Sexy Lips"	Terry Lee; Sunny Lee	Dancing Diva	2006
"Baby Face"	Jae Chong; Hsieh Meng-chuan	Show Your Love	2000
"Be Wonderful Together" †	Brandon Green; Colby Green; Vincent Fang	—N/a	2014
"Be You for a Day"	Jamie Hsueh; Francis Lee	Magic	2003
"Beast"	Tarmo Keränen; Karin Fransson; Jolin Tsai ‡	Muse	2012
"Because of You" †	Anders Bagge; Arnthor Birgisson; Christian Karlsson; Patrick Tucker; Yu Kuang-chung	1019	1999
"Beijing Welcomes You" with various artists	Xiao Ke; Albert Leung	The Official Album for Beijing 2008 Olympic Games	2008
"Black-Haired Beautiful Girl"	Jonas Saeed; Pia Sjöberg; Matthew Yen	Myself	2010
"Blame It on the Age"	Michael Tu; Eric Lin	1019	1999
"Bloody Mary"	Jolin Tsai ‡ Choice37; Hae; Se.A; Sonny; Lil G Zayvo	Pleasure	2025
"Bravo Lover" †	Lina Rafn; Adam Powers; Paw Lagermann; Issac Chen	Agent J	2007
"Bridge over Troubled Water" †	Paul Simon	Lucky Number	2001
"Butterflies in My Stomach"	Gino Chen; Andrew Chen	Myself	2010
"Butterfly"	Anders Kjer; David Clewett; Alice Gernandt; Matthew Yen	Butterfly	2009
"By Me"	Hsieh Tien-yao	Lucky Number	2001
"Can't Speak Clearly"	Jay Chou; Mao Mao	Lucky Number	2001
"Catcher"	Peter Lee; Adam Hsu	Lucky Number	2001
"Change the Future" with various artists	Lo Ta-yu; Albert Leung	—N/a	2009
"Clothing Astrology"	Jonas Nordelius; Andreas Levander; Marcus Dernulf; Francis Lee	J-Top	2006
"Color Photos"	Greeny Wu	Muse	2012
"Compromise"	Real Huang; Real Band; Howard Chiang	Butterfly	2009
"Dancing Diva"	Miriam Nervo; Olivia Nervo; Greg Kurstin; Issac Chen	Dancing Diva	2006
"Dancing Forever"	Roger Olsson; Klas Johan Wahl; Nick Whitecross; Issac Chen	Dancing Forever	2006
"Dare for More" with various artists	Andrew Tuason; Albert Leung	—N/a	2004
"Dare to Go to the Cemetery" †	Tadashi Yoshida; Kuo Ta-cheng	Dancing Forever	2006
"Darkness"	Peter Kam; Andrew Ling	Why Me, Sweetie?! Original Sound Track	2003
"Destined Guy" Show Lo featuring Jolin Tsai	Ralph Chertwell; Jud Mahoney; Michael Nielsen; Allen Sovory; Issac Chen	Hypnosis Show	2005
"Disappearing Castle"	Alex Chang Jien; Kevin Yi	Castle	2004
"DIY"	Jolin Tsai ‡ Jackson Dimiglio-Wood; Richard Craker	Pleasure	2025
"Do You Still Love Me"	Azlan Abu Hassan; KiKi Hu	Show Your Love	2000
"Don't Stop" †	Rachel Stevens; Hannah Spearritt; Bradley McIntosh; Jon Lee; Paul Cattermole; Jo O'Meara; Tina Barrett; Eliot Kennedy; Mike Percy; Tim Lever; Mao Mao	Don't Stop	2000
"Dr. Jolin"	Iggy Strange Dahl; Johan Moraeus; Christoffer Wikberg; Peggy Hsu	Muse	2012
"Ego-Holic" Starr Chen featuring Jolin Tsai	Starr Chen; David Ke	Welcome to the Next Level	2016
"Emoji" with SB19	Felip Jhon Suson; John Paulo Nase; Jolin Tsai ‡ Joshua Daniel Nase; Chendy	Wakas at Simula	2026
"Emptiness"	Chervun Liew; Chuang Ching-wen	1019	1999
"Equal in the Darkness" (Mandarin version) with Steve Aoki and MAX	Teemu Brunila; Justin Phillip Stien; Steve Aoki; Liam Tian	—N/a	2021
"Equal in the Darkness" with Steve Aoki and MAX	Teemu Brunila; Justin Phillip Stien; Steve Aoki	—N/a	2021
"Eternity"	Peter Lee; Chuang Ching-wen	Don't Stop	2000
"Everything's Gonna Be Alright"	Chervun Liew; Benny Chen	Don't Stop	2000
"Exclusive Myth"	Wang Leehom; Issac Chen	J-Game	2005
"Fake Confess"	Paul Lee; Francis Lee	Magic	2003
"Fall in Love with a Street"	Nobuhiro Makino; Hsieh Meng-chuan	Show Your Love	2000
"Fantasy"	Mikko Tamminen; Udo Mechels; Rike Boomgaarden; Greeny Wu	Muse	2012
"Fear-Free"	Paul Lee; Cheng Shu-fei	Agent J	2007
"Feel Your Presence"	Chervun Liew; Yu Kuang-chung	Show Your Love	2000
"Fight as One" with Eason Chan	Song Bingyang; Andrew Chu; Eric Kwok; Jerald Chan	—N/a	2020
"Fish Love"	Jolin Tsai ‡ Mattheos Herbert Weedon; Theodore Geoffrey Weedon; Tom Martin; Riley Biederer	Pleasure	2025
"Floating"	Peter Lee; Mao Mao	Don't Stop	2000
"Friday the 13th"	Pasi Siitonen; Adam Powers; Nalle Ahlstedt; Jimmy Chou	Muse	2012
"Gentlewomen"	Cheer Chen	Play	2014
"Get the Party Started" †	Linda Perry	Love Exercise	2008
"Give Love" †	Hung Yu-tung	—N/a	2017
"Golden Triangle"	Nik Quang; Lars Quang; RnG; Thea Hall; Issac Chen	Agent J	2007
"Good Girl"	Jolin Tsai ‡ Cheer Chen; Jackson Dimiglio-Wood; Richard Craker; Stephen Jones	Pleasure	2025
"Good Thing"	George Samuelson; Michael Lundh; Quint Starkie; Rebecca Hortlund; Francis Lee	Magic	2003
"Good-Bye"	Keith Chan; Mao Mao; Joe Lei	1019	1999
"Gravity" with Karry Wang	Zhong Wanyun	—N/a	2019
"Greek Girl by the Wishing Pond"	Ivana Wong; Alang Huang	J-Game	2005
"Guessing" †	Ronan Keating; Stephen Gately; Shane Lynch; Keith Duffy; Martin Brannigan; Ray Hedges; Daryl Yao	1019	1999
"Habitual Betrayal"	Paul Lee; Issac Chen; Howard Chiang	Jeneration	2009
"Hand in Hand" with various artists	Wang Leehom; David Tao; Issac Chen	—N/a	2003
"Happy New Year Do Re Mi" with Liu Yuning and various artists	Huang Weitao; Yang Wangshu; Yu Boshu; Huang Yuhao; Silence Wang; Chen Shuguang; Lin Juncheng; Guan Lei; Tang Laoshi; Wu Chengchen	—N/a	2019
"Hauteur" †	Kay Denar; Rob Tyger; Shawn Casselle; Gino Chen; Sunny Lee	Jeneration	2009
"Heard That Love's Ever Been Back" †	Peter Lee	Dancing Forever	2006
"Heart Breaking Day"	Alex Fung; Matthew Yen	Dancing Diva	2006
"Heartbeat of Taiwan"	Michael Lin; Vincent Fang	—N/a	2010
"Honey Trap"	Danielle Senior; Scott Wild; Luke Tsui; Gino Chen	Myself	2010
"Hot Winter" †	Mikkel Sigvardt; Thomas Troelsen; Jimmy Chou; Howard Chiang; Luke Chen	Butterfly	2009
"Hubby"	Rhys Fletcher; Stan Dubb; Richard Craker; Alex Sypes; Jolin Tsai ‡ Jennifer Hung; Color Lee	Ugly Beauty	2018
"Hunting Cupid"	Edward Chan; Charles Lee; Jack Chou	J-Game	2005
"I Feel Good!"	Chin Tieh-chang; Thomas Tsai; Daryl Yao	Sony Shining Star: Sony Asian New Talent's Notebook	2000
"I Love, I Embrace"	William Wei; Derek Shih	Play	2014
"I Know You're Feeling Blue"	Jimmy Ye; Kiki Hu	1019	1999
"I Wanna Know" † Alesso featuring Jolin Tsai	Jolin Tsai ‡ Alessandro Lindblad; Kahouly Nicolay Sereba; Vincent Dery; Ozzy Jaquesson Sowe	—N/a	2016
"I Won't Last a Day Without You" †	Roger Nichols; Paul Williams	Love Exercise	2008
"I'm Not Yours" featuring Namie Amuro	Jolin Tsai ‡ Hayley Aitken; Olof Lindskog; Iggy Strange Dahl; Wyman Wong	Play	2014
"I"	Tanya Chua; Xiao Han	Muse	2012
"Ideal State"	Kaede Chang; Alang Huang	Agent J	2007
"If Don't Want"	Chervun Liew; Hsieh Meng-chuan; Low Shao Ying	Lucky Number	2001
"If You Said Love Me at That Day"	Sandee Chan	Show Your Love	2000
"In My Arms" Kylie Minogue featuring Jolin Tsai	Kylie Minogue; Calvin Harris; Richard "Biff" Stannard; Paul Harris; Julian Peake	X (Asia special edition)	2007
"Inside Out"	Jolin Tsai ‡ Anders Gukko; Sandra Wikström; The Crane; Razor Chiang	Pleasure	2025
"It's Love"	Jay Chou; Simon Liang	Castle	2004
"J-Game"	Jonas Nordelius; Andreas Levander; Awa Manneh; Issac Chen	J-Game	2005
"Journey"	Jaakko Salovaara; Park Geun-tae; Nalle Ahlstedt; Matthew Yen	—N/a	2013
"Kaleidoscope"	Real Huang; Matthew Yen	—N/a	2014
"Karma"	Jolin Tsai ‡ Hayley Aitken; Johan Gustafsson; Lan Xiaoxie	Ugly Beauty	2018
"Kiss Me" †	Matt Slocum	Love Exercise	2008
"Lady in Red"	Alex Ni; Lotus Wang; Karencici; Jeff Bova; Matthew Yen	Ugly Beauty	2018
"Lady Marmalade" †	Bob Crewe; Kenny Nolan	Love Exercise	2008
"Layers"	Jolin Tsai ‡ Nick Lee; Ross Golan	Pleasure	2025
"Let's Break Up"	Tan Vui Chuan; David Ke	Myself	2010
"Let's Move It"	Nik Quang; Lars Quang; RnG; Sasia Nielsen; James Chu; Bruce Yao	Agent J	2007
"Life Sucks"	Sam Fishman; Jazelle Rodriguez; Samual Petersen; Tom Wang	Ugly Beauty	2018
"Lip Reading"	Ooi Teng Fong; Neoh Kim Hin	Play	2014
"Living with the World"	Ronald Ng; Chuang Ching-wen	1019	1999
"Love Attraction" †	Michel Daudin; Matthieu Chedid; Sunny Lee	Butterfly	2009
"Love in the Shape of a Heart"	Yuri ChanVincent Fang	Dancing Diva	2006
"Love Is Near"	Chen Wei; Adam Hsu	Show Your Love	2000
"Love Love Love" †	Konstantin Meladze; Simon Liang	Castle	2004
"Love Player"	Gabriel Ssezibwa; Rene Prang; Lars Quang; Nik Quang; Gino Chen	Myself	2010
"Love Song for You" †	Lee Soo-young; Chuang Ching-wen	Don't Stop	2000
"Lovefool" †	Nina Persson; Peter Svensson	Love Exercise	2008
"Lucky Number"	Paul Lee; Hsieh Meng-chuan	Lucky Number	2001
"Macho Babe"	Jo Hyun-chul; Luke Tsui	Myself	2010
"Magic"	Edward Chan; Charles Lee; Issac Chen	Magic	2003
"Marry Me Today" David Tao featuring Jolin Tsai	David Tao; Wawa Chen	Beautiful	2006
"Medusa"	Emile Ghantous; Erik Nelson; Nasri Atweh; Lakesha Hinton; Matthew Yen	Play	2014
"Metronome"	Jamie Hsueh; Jolin Tsai ‡	Agent J	2007
"Miss Trouble"	Jolin Tsai ‡ Hayley Aitken; Olof Lindskog; Iggy Strange Dahl; David Ke	Play	2014
"Missing You"	Lim Seong Gim; Francis Lee	J-Game	2005
"Missing" †	Simon Raymonde; Elizabeth Fraser; Robin Guthrie; Wyman Wong	Dancing Forever	2006
"Mosaic"	JJ Lin; Tom Wang	Muse	2012
"Mr. Q"	Miriam Nervo; Olivia Nervo; Ben Thomas; Dele Ladimeji; Issac Chen	Dancing Diva	2006
"My Choice"	Tan Boon Wah; Francis Lee; Al Kuan	J-Top	2006
"Necessary Evil"	Razor Chiang; Starr Chen; Lee Wei-jing	Ugly Beauty	2018
"Nice Cat" †	Anna Lidner; Charles Kwashie Tamakloe; Issac Chen	Castle	2004
"Nice Guy" featuring Stanley Huang	Stanley Huang; Luke Tsui	Dancing Diva	2006
"Nothing Left to Say"	Ooi Teng Fong; Neoh Kim Hin	Myself	2010
"Now Is the Time" †	Brandon Green; Julia Dougall; Colby Green; Ellen Pietropaoli	Pepsi Beats of the Beautiful Game	2014
"Oh La La La"	Jolin Tsai ‡ Richard Craker; Presto'C; Wendy Wen	—N/a	2023
"Oh Oh"	Jonas Nordelius; Andreas Levander; Jeanette Olsson; Issac Chen	J-Game	2005
"On Happiness Road"	Mickey Lin; Lin Chia-ching; Francis Lee; Lin Hwang-kuen	—N/a	2017
"Only One of You"	Azlan Abu Hasan; Yao Chien	Lucky Number	2001
"Opposite"	KingMing; Huang Tzu-yuan	The Wolf Original Television Series Soundtrack	2020
"Out on the Street" †	Jun Young-hun; Mao Mao	1019	1999
"Overlooking Purposely"	Mads Hauge; Vincent DeGiorgio; Sunny Lee; Francis Lee	J-Game	2005
"Parachute"	Zyan Tan	Butterfly	2009
"Paradise" †	Jem Griffiths; Gerard B. Young Jr. Johann Sebastien Bach; Ward Swingle; Issac Chen	J1 Live Concert	2005
"Party Star"	Gabriel Ssezibwa; Rene Prang; Lars Quang; Nik Quang; Matthew Yen	Myself	2010
"Phony Queen"	Dominik Rothert; Jason Worthy; Jessica Jean Pfeiffer; Alexander Krause; Wyman Wong	Play	2014
"Physical" †	Steve Kipner; Terry Shaddick	Love Exercise	2008
"Pillow"	Jolin Tsai ‡ Abigail Frances Jones; A-Hao; Starr Chen	Pleasure	2025
"Pirates"	Jay Chou; Issac Chen	Castle	2004
"Play"	Alex Ni; Hsia Yu	Play	2014
"Pleasure"	Jolin Tsai ‡ Ross Golan; Richard Craker; Valentina Ploy; Tom Wang	Pleasure	2025
"Prague Square"	Jay Chou; Vincent Fang	Magic	2003
"Pretence"	Howard Ku; Howard Chiang	Dancing Diva	2006
"Pretence" (Cantonese version)	Howard Ku; Keith Chan	Dancing Forever	2006
"Pretty Pretty Day"	David Wu; Mao Mao	Show Your Love	2000
"Priceless"	Tam Jung Chen; Gino Chen; Ang Swee Giap	Agent J	2007
"Priority"	Dawn Joseph; Henry Gorman; Francis Lee	Castle	2004
"Prove It"	George Samuelson; Michael Lundh; Quint Starkie; Allan Rich; Kevin Yi	Magic	2003
"Pulchritude"	Lars Quang; Thea Winkelmann; Luke Tsui	Dancing Diva	2006
"Real Hurt"	Jackey Yow; David Ke	Myself	2010
"Real Man" † featuring Nick Chou	Jonas Jeberg; Mikkel Sigvardt; Mich Hansen; Nina Woodford; Isaac Chen	Butterfly	2009
"Reluctant"	Jimmy Ye; Hsieh Meng-chuan	Show Your Love	2000
"Repeated Note"	Jamie Hsueh; Jolin Tsai ‡	J-Game	2005
"Rewind"	Jay Chou; Vincent Fang	Castle	2004
"Rival in Love"	Toby Baker; Paul Borg; Debbie French; Gary Poole; Gino Chen	Dancing Forever	2006
"Romance"	Victor Lau; Wyman Wong	Ugly Beauty	2018
"Rope on Vest"	Clayton Cheung; Jolin Tsai ‡	Magic	2003
"Run Run" †	Henrik Korpi; Karen Poole; Mathias Wollo; Matthew Yen; Issac Chen	Jeneration	2009
"Safari"	Jolin Tsai ‡ Mark Carl Stolinski Williams; Raul Ignacio Cubina; GG Ramirez; James Norton	Pleasure	2025
"Say Love You"	Jay Chou; Simon Liang	Magic	2003
"See at a Glance"	Tom Pan; Daryl Yao	Show Your Love	2000
"Seven"	Jolin Tsai ‡ Greeny Wu; Richard Craker	Pleasure	2025
"Shadow Self"	Mickey Lin; Jolin Tsai ‡ Sam Ho; Huang Tzu-yuan	Ugly Beauty	2018
"Shake Your Body" with various artists	Ting Yang; Vincent Fang	—N/a	2014
"Show Your Love"	Paul Lee; Benny Chen	Show Your Love	2000
"Signature Gesture"	Edward Chan; Charles Lee; Issac Chen	J9	2004
"Single Harm" †	Kang Hyun-min; Francis Lee	J9	2004
"Sky"	Wesley Chia; Kiki Hu	J-Game	2005
"Slave Ship"	Jamie Hsueh; Issac Chen	Magic	2003
"Slow Life" †	Thomas Eriksson; Isaac Chen	Butterfly	2009
"Smell of the Popcorn"	Wan Chiu; Vincent Fang	Magic	2003
"Someday, Somewhere"	Jolin Tsai ‡ Richard Craker; Ren Chi	—N/a	2023
"Someone"	Chen Hui-ting	Muse	2012
"Spying on You Behind the Fence"	Greeny Wu	Muse	2012
"Stand Up"	Hanif Hitmanic Sabzevari; Dennis DeKo Kordnejad; Pontus PJ Ljung; Daniel Kim; Xu Qi	—N/a	2017
"Stars Align" with R3hab	Fadil El Ghoul; Rik Annema; Cimo Fränkel	—N/a	2021
"Sugar Sugar" †	Andy Kim; Jeff Barry	Don't Stop	2000
"Sun Will Never Set" †	Alexander Bard; Anders Hansson; Luke Tsui	Agent J	2007
"Surprise"	Jae Chong; Mao Mao	Lucky Number	2001
"Sweet and Sour"	Jamie Hsueh; Francis Lee	J-Game	2005
"Sweet Guilty Pleasure"	Jolin Tsai ‡ Olof Lindskog; Hayley Aitken; Johan Moraeus; Adia	Ugly Beauty	2018
"Sweetie"	Peter Kam; Andrew Ling	Why Me, Sweetie?! Original Sound Track	2003
"Tacit Violence"	Nik Quang; Thea Hall; Lars Quang; RnG; Isaac Chen; Howard Chiang; Sunny Lee	Agent J	2007
"Take Immediate Action"	Ooi Teng Fong; Neoh Kim Hin	Myself	2010
"Take It Easy"	Chen Chih-yuan; Yu Kuang-chung; Mao Mao	Lucky Number	2001
"Thank You" †	Dido Armstrong; Paul Herman	Love Exercise	2008
"The Blower's Daughter" †	Damien Rice	Love Exercise	2008
"The Finale"	Peter Lee; Ashin	Dancing Diva	2006
"The Great Artist"	Robin Jenssen; Anne Judith Wik; Nermin Harambasic; Ronny Svendsen; Charite Viken Reinas; Eirik Johansen; Alexander Puntervold; Matthew Yen	Muse	2012
"The Player"	Alex Ni; Swing Wang; Huang Chien-chou	—N/a	2018
"The Prologue"	Xiao Yu; Jolin Tsai ‡	Dancing Diva	2006
"The Rose" †	Amanda McBroom	1019	1999
"The Shadow Dancer"	Christian Lindberg; Ivar Lisinski; Billy Mann; Isaac Chen	Butterfly	2009
"The Smell of Lemon Grass"	Peter Lee; Francis Lee	Castle	2004
"The Spirit of Knight"	Jay Chou; Jolin Tsai ‡	Magic	2003
"The Starter"	Jamie Hsueh; Jolin Tsai ‡	Castle	2004
"The Third Person and I"	JJ Lin; Tom Wang	Play	2014
"There Is a Tiger" † with various artists	Jon Ma	—N/a	2010
"Touch Your Heart" †	Huang Tung-kung; Huang Chien-ming; Chris Hou	—N/a	2009
"Turn Back Time"	Xiao Yu; Chen Li'an; David Ke	The Wolf Original Television Series Soundtrack	2020
"Ugly Beauty"	Rhys Fletcher; Stan Dubb; Richard Craker; Jolin Tsai ‡ Starr Chen; Jennifer Hung; Greeny Wu	Ugly Beauty	2018
"Under the Sea" †	Alan Menken; Matthew Yen	Hong Kong Disneyland: The Grand Opening Celebration Album	2005
"Untitled"	Jolin Tsai ‡ Kay Liu; Vison Chen; David Ke	—N/a	2022
"Vulnerability"	Xiao Yu; Liao Ting-i	Ugly Beauty	2018
"Wandering Poet"	Peggy Hsu	Muse	2012
"Warriors in Peace"	A. R. Rahman; Francis Lee	Warriors of Heaven and Earth: Original Motion Picture Soundtrack	2003
"Watch Me Closely"	Chen Wei; Yu Kuang-chung	Lucky Number	2001
"We Are One" Hardwell featuring Jolin Tsai	Robbert van de Corput; Willem van Hanegem; Ward van der Harst; Robin van Loenen; Alexander Tidebrink	—N/a	2017
"We're All Different, Yet the Same"	Christoffer Vikberg; Hayley Aitken; Iggy Strange Dahl; Johan Moraeus; Albert Leung	Play	2014
"What Kind of Love"	Jimmy Ye; Jerry Huang	Don't Stop	2000
"When You Say Nothing at All" †	Don Schlitz; Paul Overstreet	Love Exercise	2008
"Where the Dream Takes You"	Diane Warren; Newton Howard; Hsieh Meng-chuan	Atlantis: The Lost Empire	2001
"Who Am I" with Jony J	Maurice; KingMing; Neoh Kim Hin; Jony J	The Wolf Original Television Series Soundtrack	2020
"Who Are You"	Jose Manuel Lopez Moles; Yu Kuang-chung	1019	1999
"Woman's Work"	Jolin Tsai ‡ Jenna Andrews; Stephen Eric Kirk; Joe Kirk	Pleasure	2025
"Womxnly"	Razor Chiang; Jolin Tsai ‡ Ashin	Ugly Beauty	2018
"Words of Loneliness"	Kuo Heng-chi; Wu Yu-kang	Don't Stop	2000
"You Gotta Know"	Chen Wei; Henry Lu	Don't Stop	2000
"You Hurt My Feelings"	Tan Vui Chuan; Albert Leung	Butterfly	2009

== Unreleased songs ==
- "Cherry Cherry" is a song co-written by Adam Hsu, with the specific songwriting credits remaining unclear. Tsai performed the song once during Kiki Ting's 2002 concert but has never recorded or released it.
- "Let Love Come Closer" is an adaptation of Destiny's Child's "Stand Up for Love", originally composed by David Foster and later re-lyricized by Issac Chen. The song served as the theme for McDonald's 2005 World Children's Day campaign. Tsai first performed it during the Power of Love Concert held by Show Lo in 2005. She later included it in her 2006 Dancing Forever World Tour for three performances in Taipei, though it was never officially recorded or released.
- "Little Child" is a song specifically written for Tsai by Stone, Ashin, and Chen Mo. She first performed the song at her 2013 Summer Super Slippa concert, but it was never recorded or released. The song later became the theme for the 2014 film Endless Nights in Aurora and was reinterpreted by Fish Leong, with some lyrical changes.
