= Heartbeat of Taiwan =

Promotional single by Jolin Tsai
- Language: Mandarin
- Released: April 27, 2010
- Genre: Pop
- Length: 4:07
- Label: Warner; Mars
- Composer: Michael Lin
- Lyricist: Vincent Fang
- Producer: Michael Lin

Music video
- "Heartbeat of Taiwan" on YouTube

"Heartbeat of Taiwan" (Chinese: 台灣的心跳聲; pinyin: Táiwān de xīntiàoshēng) is a song by Taiwanese singer Jolin Tsai, with lyrics by Vincent Fang and music and production by Michael Lin. It served as the theme song for the Taiwan Pavilion at the Expo 2010. It was released on April 27, 2010, as a promotional single by Taiwan Realty.

== Composition ==
Tsai was invited to perform "Heartbeat of Taiwan", the theme song for the Taiwan Pavilion at the Expo 2010. She collaborated with rapper Ryan Kou, who performed the rap segment of the track.

The lyricist Vincent Fang explained that the lyrics were inspired by the imagery of sky lanterns and highlighted distinctive elements of Taiwanese culture, such as Sanyi wood sculpture, Meinong oil-paper umbrella, and Yanshuei firework—marking a departure from his usual depictions of European themes.

The song blends pop with cultural and humanistic elements. Tsai expressed her delight in taking on the role of lead vocalist, noting that the song's poetic imagery captures Taiwan's unique cultural spirit. She shared her hope that the song would help more people fall in love with Taiwan and looked forward to the full release of its music video.

== Music video ==
The music video was sponsored by Taiwan Realty, with a production budget of NT$50 million. Directed by Jerry Fan, the music video was widely aired as a television commercial across Taiwan, and made freely available online and as a physical DVD.

The video showcases Taiwan's breathtaking natural landscapes, quaint alleyways, traditional folk customs, and religious practices—evoking a strong sense of cultural identity and emotional connection. Tsai appears in the video, delivering a heartfelt performance as she gently lights lanterns to offer blessings on behalf of the nation. She invites viewers to experience the genuine heartbeat of Taiwan through the song's lyrics, melody, and visuals.

Fan noted that Tsai, along with the lyricist Vincent Fang and the producer Michael Lin, are longtime friends, which gave her interpretation added depth and sincerity. Initially, she was not intended to appear on screen, but her inclusion ultimately enhanced the overall impact of the video. The music video was broadcast throughout the six-month duration of the World Expo and heavily promoted on Taiwanese television channels.

== Mentioned items ==
Lyrics mentioned	hedera helix, fire hydrant, neon lighting, Sanyi wood sculpture, and Yonghe soy milk
Video mentioned	sunrise, sea of clouds, shinboku, water buffalo, diabolo, tai chi, sanheyuan, grocery store, Guishan Island, Bamboo Lake, taekwondo, glove puppetry, ferris wheel, Taipei 101, road traffic safety, street artist, Tamsui Old Street, Hakka blue shirt, Taiwan floral cloth, carousel, people with Down syndrome, Chiang Kai-shek Memorial Hall, Dihua Street, Taipei Xia-Hai City God Temple, Taipei International Flora Exposition Pavilion of Dreams (Xinsheng Park), National Symphony Orchestra, Museum of Drinking Water, Dalongdong Baoan Temple (corresponding to Lungshan Temple in the lyrics), and Huadong Valley (corresponding to Chiayi–Tainan Plain in the lyrics)
Both lyrics and video mentioned	swallowtail butterfly, nanohana, Tamsui River, Taroko National Park, Night market in Taiwan, Cloud Gate Dance Theater, Yanshuei firework, sky lantern, Pingtung blackfin tuna, Meinong oil-paper umbrella, baseball in Taiwan (representing Taiwan Spirit), Fengtian Temple (corresponding to Mazu in the lyrics), Pat Ka Chiong (depicted as Guan Jiang Shou in the video), Chiayi–Tainan Plain (depicted as Huadong Valley in the video), and Bangka Lungshan Temple (depicted as Dalongdong Baoan Temple in the video)

== Live performances ==
On December 13, 2011, Tsai performed the song in the EVA Air 20th Anniversary Concert. On August 9, 2014, she performed the song at the Hsinchu Hakka Yimin Festival in Taiwan.

== Influences ==
Due to its catchy lyrics and memorable melody, "Heartbeat of Taiwan" gained wide popularity and became a subject for various parodies and adaptations by netizens. Around the time of the song's release, Taiwan was actively engaged in public debate over the death penalty. In response to this social discourse, the Taiwan Alliance to End the Death Penalty created and released a parody version titled "Heartbeat of Killing". This adaptation was intended to highlight and critique the implications and ethical concerns surrounding capital punishment.

== Release history ==
Region	Date	Format	Distributor
Taiwan	April 27, 2010	DVD	Taiwan Realty
