= Stars Align (song) =

2021 single by R3hab and Jolin Tsai

Single by R3hab and Jolin Tsai
- Released: March 21, 2021
- Genre: Dance
- Length: 2:41
- Label: Liquid State
- Songwriters: Fadil El Ghoul; Rik Annema; Cimo Fränkel
- Producer: R3hab

R3hab singles chronology
"Distant Memory" (2021)	"Stars Align" (2021)	"Sorry I Missed Your Call" (2021)

Jolin Tsai singles chronology
"Gravity" (2019)	"Stars Align" (2021)	"Equal in the Darkness" (2021)

Music video
- "Stars Align" on YouTube

"Stars Align" is a song by Dutch DJ R3hab and Taiwanese singer Jolin Tsai. It was written by Fadil El Ghoul, Rik Annema, and Cimo Fränkel, and produced by R3hab. It served as the theme song for the third anniversary of the video game PUBG Mobile. The single was released on March 21, 2021, by Liquid State.

== Background ==
On August 30, 2020, Tsai's manager, Tom Wang, revealed that she was planning to release new music. On November 29, 2020, Tsai confirmed that a new single would be released the following year. Later, on December 22, 2020, she commented, "The release of a new song really depends on luck. We'll start some production work, but it's uncertain whether it will be completed on time." On January 19, 2021, Wang shared that Tsai had finished recording her new single, noting that "the song selection process took quite a while."

On March 18, 2021, R3hab announced that his new single with Tsai would be released on March 21. Tsai remarked, "This song is beyond words. I'm truly excited for 'Stars Align' to meet the world and to hear fans' reactions." On March 22, 2021, she revealed plans to shoot a music video for the song.

== Composition and recording ==
The song is rooted in electronic dance music, blending R3hab's signature EDM beats with an energetic and richly layered arrangement. Tsai's precise articulation and distinctive vocal tone complement the dance style seamlessly. "Stars Align" marks the first collaboration between R3hab and Tsai. Tsai shared that she was instantly drawn to the demo, especially the catchy and playful hook. Upon hearing the final version, its melody and rhythm made her want to dance. R3hab expressed that he's constantly pushing musical boundaries and exploring new styles, and his collaboration with Tsai sparked fresh inspiration and creativity.

== Music video ==
On April 5, 2021, U.S.-based music marketing company Proximity released the lyric video for "Stars Align". Later, on April 23, 2021, Tsai unveiled the official music video, directed by Muh Chen. The video tells the story of Tsai awakening in an enchanted forest, where she encounters a mysterious hermit. She follows him to a Moroccan-inspired architectural setting, where she experiences insomnia, sorrow, fasting, and emotional withdrawal—symbolizing the turmoil of a love-struck "illness". Through this journey, her inner world gradually begins to heal.

The video was filmed over the course of two days, during which Tsai wore eight distinct outfits reflecting a wide range of styles. To evoke an exotic atmosphere, the video was shot at the Kenting Amanda Hotel in Pingtung County, Taiwan. Tsai shared that she had previously traveled to Morocco, where the architecture—featuring inward-facing windows, vibrant room colors, and lavish pool designs—left a lasting impression of opulence. Additional scenes were filmed at the White Banyan Garden in Manzhou, Pingtung County. Tsai described the opportunity to shoot there as a rare and valuable experience. The choreography combines elements of vogue and floorwork, presenting a high level of technical difficulty.

On December 1, 2021, "Stars Align" ranked fourth on YouTube Taiwan's list of the Top Trending Music Videos of the Year.

== Other versions ==
On April 22, 2021, a remixed version of "Stars Align" by Alle Farben was released. This was followed by another remix by Faulhaber, which debuted on May 20, 2021.

== Commercial performance ==
The song was ranked number 10 on Hit FM's Top 100 Singles of 2021.

== Accolades ==
On December 11, 2021, "Stars Align" was awarded one of the Top 10 Songs at the 3rd Tencent Music Entertainment Awards.

== Track listing ==
- Digital download and streaming
1. "Stars Align" – 2:41
- Digital download and streaming – Alle Farben remix
1. "Stars Align" (Alle Farben remix) – 2:54
- Digital download and streaming – Faulhaber remix
1. "Stars Align" (Faulhaber remix) – 2:44

== Charts ==
=== Weekly charts ===
Chart (2021)	Peak position
China (Tencent)	14

== Release history ==
Release dates and formats for "Stars Align"
Region	Date	Format(s)	Version	Label
Various	March 21, 2021	Digital download; streaming	Original version	Liquid State
Various	April 22, 2021	Digital download; streaming	Alle Farben remix	Liquid State
Various	May 20, 2021	Digital download; streaming	Faulhaber remix	Liquid State
