= Why Me, Sweetie?! =

2003 Hong Kong film by Jingle Ma

- DVD cover
- Directed by: Jingle Ma
- Written by: Susan Chan; Ivy Yung
- Produced by: Cheung Chi-Gwong
- Starring: Louis Koo; Cherrie Ying; Tats Lau
- Cinematography: Jingle Ma; Chan Kwok-Hung
- Edited by: Kwong Chi-Leung
- Music by: Peter Kam
- Distributed by: China Star Entertainment Group
- Release date: 10 April 2003
- Running time: 97 minutes
- Country: Hong Kong
- Language: Cantonese

Why Me, Sweetie?! (simplified Chinese: 失忆𠝹女王; traditional Chinese: 失憶𠝹女王) is a 2003 Hong Kong film directed by Jingle Ma and starring Louis Koo and Cherrie Ying.

== Plot ==
This is the film that inspired the American 50 First Dates with Adam Sandler. The movie starts with Don (Louis Koo) on a bus with 2 girls fighting over him. He then meets Ding Ding(Cherrie Ying) who suddenly falls in love with him. But when he woke up early next morning, he had forgotten Ding Ding and she got real mad at him. But luckily, a doctor(Tats Lau) told Ding Ding everything about Don. So they try to help Don with his memories, before he stays like that forever...

== Cast ==
- Louis Koo
- Cherrie Ying
- Tats Lau
- Sui Junbo
