= Gravity (Karry Wang and Jolin Tsai song) =

Single by Karry Wang and Jolin Tsai
- Language: Mandarin
- Released: November 2, 2019
- Studio: 55TEC (Beijing); Mega Force (New Taipei)
- Genre: Pop
- Length: 4:17
- Label: Time Fengjun
- Songwriter: Zhong Wanyun
- Producer: Razor Chiang

Karry Wang singles chronology
"My Way" (2019)	"Gravity" (2019)	"Beautiful" (2020)

Jolin Tsai singles chronology
"Ugly Beauty" (2018)	"Gravity" (2019)	"Stars Align" (2021)

"Gravity" (Chinese: 心引力; pinyin: Xīn yǐn lì) is a song by Chinese singer Karry Wang and Taiwanese singer Jolin Tsai. Written by Zhong Wanyun and produced by Razor Chiang, the track was released as a single on November 2, 2019, through Time Fengjun.

== Background ==
The collaboration between Wang and Tsai was first discovered on October 18, 2019, when the Beijing Municipal Bureau of Culture and Tourism included Tsai in its official performance permit bulletin for Wang's Dream Concert. The concert was scheduled for November 1, 2019, at the Cadillac Arena in Beijing.

During an interview on October 28, 2019, Wang confirmed Tsai's participation, expressing excitement over their collaboration and stating, "It is such a joy to share the stage with Jolin Tsai." The performance, which marked the debut of their duet "Gravity", took place at Wang's concert, where he remarked that "Jolin will surely bring sweetness to the song."

== Composition ==
"Gravity" is a lighthearted pop duet characterized by an upbeat tempo and guitar-driven instrumentation. The song's vocal arrangement emphasizes the harmonious blending of Wang's and Tsai's voices, contributing to the sweet, romantic tone of the track. The lyrics reflect themes of mutual attraction, affection, and the blissful moments of love, further enhancing its light and charming mood.

== Charts ==
=== Weekly charts ===
Chart (2019)	Peak position
China (Tencent)	2

== Credits and personnel ==
- AJ Chen – recording engineering, mixing
- Chuan Wang – background vocals, background vocal arrangement
- 55TEC Studio – recording studio
- Mega Force Studio – recording studio, mixing studio

== Release history ==
Release dates and formats for "Gravity"
Region	Date	Format(s)	Distributor
Various	November 2, 2019	Digital download; streaming	Time Fengjun
