= Jeneration =

2009 greatest hits album by Jolin Tsai

Greatest hits album by Jolin Tsai
- Released: February 27, 2009
- Genre: Pop
- Length: 1:57:38
- Label: Gold Typhoon; Mars
- Producer: Adia; Peter Lee; Paul Lee; Lars Quang; Nik Quang; RnG; Michael Lin; Paula Ma; Jae Chong; Bing Wang; Stanley Huang; Johan Lee; Wu Bai; David Tao; Yuri Chan; Jamie Hsueh

Jolin Tsai chronology
Love Exercise (2008)	Jeneration (2009)	Butterfly (2009)

Jeneration (Chinese: J世紀) is a greatest hits album by Taiwanese singer Jolin Tsai, released on February 27, 2009, by Gold Typhoon. The album features 27 tracks originally released during Tsai's time with EMI, along with three previously unreleased songs.

== Background ==
On December 16, 2008, Tsai signed with Warner. On February 19, 2009, Gold Typhoon announced plans to release a greatest hits compilation featuring 27 tracks from Tsai's EMI era, along with three previously unreleased songs: "Hauteur", "Run Run", and "Habitual Betrayal". On the same day, media reports revealed that Gold Typhoon and Sony had initially planned to jointly release the compilation, but the project was canceled due to copyright and revenue-sharing disputes.

== Commercial performance ==
In its first week of release, the album ranked number five on Taiwan's Chia Chia Records sales chart, and secured number two on both the G-Music and Five Music weekly sales charts.

== Critical reception ==
Tencent Entertainment commented that this greatest hits album released by Gold Typhoon is likely the only compilation from Tsai's EMI era. They highlighted the three previously unreleased new songs as the album's standout features, although stylistically they offer little innovation and can even be seen as leftover works from the Gold Typhoon era. Nonetheless, these tracks hold collectible value for fans. The album's release timing, just before Tsai's new album Butterfly (2009), mirrors similar strategies previously used by Universal and Sony, resulting in mixed market reactions. Despite this, Tsai's immense popularity ensured the album received some level of support.

Hong Kong Economic Times noted that the new songs "Hauteur" and "Run Run" fall within Tsai's signature electronic dance genre but fail to stand out, possibly due to being remakes of older material. In contrast, the other new track, "Habitual Betrayal", incorporates minor key elements, delivering a favorable effect.

== Track listing ==
Jeneration – Disc 1
No.	Title	Lyrics	Music	Producer(s)	Length
1.	"Hauteur"	Gino Chen; Sunny Lee	Kay Denar; Rob Tyger; Shawn Casselle	Jae Chong	3:39
2.	"Run Run"	Issac Chen; Matthew Yen	Henrik Korpi; Karen Poole; Mathias Wollo	Bing Wang	2:41
3.	"Pulchritude"	Luke Tsui	Lars Quang; Thea Winkelmann	Adia	3:33
4.	"Dancing Diva"	Issac Chen	Miriam Nervo; Olivia Nervo; Greg Kurstin	Adia	3:04
5.	"Agent J"	Sunny Lee; Matthew Yen; Neoh Kim Hin	Ooi Teng Fong	Adia	3:35
6.	"A Wonder in Madrid"	Alang Huang	Hagen Troy	Paul Lee	3:35
7.	"Mr. Q"	Issac Chen	Miriam Nervo; Olivia Nervo; Ben Thomas; Dele Ladimeji	Adia	3:21
8.	"Nice Guy"	Luke Tsui	Stanley Huang	Stanley Huang	3:19
9.	"Let's Move It"	Bruce Yao	Nik Quang; Lars Quang; RnG; Sasia Nielsen; James Chu	Lars Quang; Nik Quang; RnG	3:14
10.	"Rival in Love"	Gino Chen	Toby Baker; Paul Borg; Debbie French; Gary Poole	Adia	3:01
11.	"Golden Triangle"	Issac Chen	Nik Quang; Thea Hall; Lars Quang; RnG	Lars Quang; Nik Quang; RnG	3:02
12.	"Dancing Forever"	Issac Chen	Roger Olsson; Klas Johan Wahl; Nick Whitecross	Adia	4:06
13.	"Bravo Lover"	Issac Chen	Lina Rafn; Adam Powers; Paw Lagermann	Adia	3:53
14.	"Dare to Go to the Cemetery"	Kuo Ta-cheng	Tadashi Yoshida	Wu Bai	4:14
15.	"Sun Will Never Set"	Luke Tsui	Alexander Bard; Anders Hansson	Michael Lin	3:48
Total length:					52:05

Jeneration – Disc 2
No.	Title	Lyrics	Music	Producer(s)	Length
1.	"Habitual Betrayal"	Issac Chen; Howard Chiang	Paul Lee	Paul Lee	4:30
2.	"Heard That Love's Ever Been Back"	Peter Lee	Peter Lee	Peter Lee	5:08
3.	"Pretence"	Howard Chiang	Howard Ku	Paula Ma	5:15
4.	"Heart Breaking Day"	Matthew Yen	Alex Fung	Peter Lee	4:11
5.	"Priceless"	Ang Swee Giap; Gino Chen; Tam Jung Chen	Tam Jung Chen	Michael Lin	4:33
6.	"Tacit Violence"	Issac Chen; Sunny Lee; Wonderful	Nik Quang; Thea Hall; Lars Quang; RnG	Lars Quang; Nik Quang; RnG	3:01
7.	"Ideal State"	Alang Huang	Kaede Chang	Paul Lee	3:32
8.	"Marry Me Today"	David Tao; Wawa Chen	David Tao	David Tao	4:32
9.	"Love in the Shape of a Heart"	Vincent Fang	Yuri Chan	Yuri Chan	4:10
10.	"Alone"	Al Kuan	Carl Ng	Paula Ma	4:41
11.	"Metronome"	Jolin Tsai	Jamie Hsueh	Derek Lin	4:38
12.	"Fear-Free"	Cheng Shu-fei	Paul Lee	Paul Lee	4:35
13.	"The Finale"	Ashin	Peter Lee	Peter Lee	4:38
14.	"The Prologue"	Jolin Tsai	Xiao Yu	Peter Lee	4:31
15.	"Missing"	Wyman Wong	Simon Raymonde; Elizabeth Fraser; Robin Guthrie	Peter Lee	3:38
Total length:					65:33

== Release history ==
Region	Date	Format	Distributor
Various	February 27, 2009	Streaming	Mars
Taiwan	February 27, 2009	2CD	Gold Typhoon
China	March 25, 2009	2CD	Push Typhoon
