= Love Exercise =

2008 studio album by Jolin Tsai

- Standard edition cover

Studio album by Jolin Tsai
- Released: October 31, 2008
- Recorded: 2008
- Genre: Pop
- Length: 41:09
- Label: Gold Typhoon; Mars
- Producer: Paula Ma; Peter Lee; Jim Lee; Daniel Bi; Paul Lee; Adia

Jolin Tsai chronology
Agent J (2007)	Love Exercise (2008)	Jeneration (2009)

Love Exercise (Chinese: 愛的練習語) is a cover album by Taiwanese singer Jolin Tsai, released on October 31, 2008, by Gold Typhoon. The album was launched alongside a book of the same name. It features ten English-language cover songs, produced by Paula Ma, Peter Lee, Jim Lee, Daniel Bi, Paul Lee, and Adia.

Originally scheduled for release on March 7, 2008, the album's launch was delayed due to internal personnel changes and share acquisitions within EMI Greater China. The album sold over 30,000 copies in Taiwan and ranked as the top-selling Western album in Taiwan for 2008.

== Background ==
On January 12, 2008, media reports revealed that Tsai had begun recording an English-language album planned for release after the 2008 Lunar New Year. The album was set to be accompanied by a new English learning book authored by Tsai. On January 20, 008, EMI announced that pre-orders for the album would open on February 14, with an official release date scheduled for March 7. Tsai expressed that learning English through listening to songs is both fast and practical, stating, "Even now, I still prefer to learn English by listening to music." The album features ten English songs centered on themes of love and emotions. It is paired with an English book of the same title, which uses song lyrics to help analyze vocabulary and grammar.

== Development ==
On February 29, 2008, media reports indicated that the album's release had been delayed due to internal personnel changes within EMI Greater China. Tsai's manager, Howard Chiang, stated that the production costs had exceeded NT$5 million and urged EMI to finalize the release date as soon as possible. On March 26, 2008, reports emerged that EMI planned to cease its record business operations in Asia after Easter that year. By July 4, 2008, media revealed that Tsai's team had missed the original promotional schedule and that she would no longer be able to participate in promotion activities for the album.

On August 3, former EMI Asia regional general manager Norman Cheng announced plans to acquire all EMI shares in Greater China, including Taiwan's EMI, Hong Kong's Gold Entertainment, and Mainland China's Push Typhoon, restructuring them into a new company called Gold Typhoon. Artists formerly under EMI, including Tsai, would automatically transfer their contracts to Gold Typhoon. On August 27, 2008, media reports stated that the album was expected to be released between September and October. On October 14, 2008, Gold Typhoon announced that pre-orders would open on October 17, with the official release set for October 31.

== Release and promotion ==
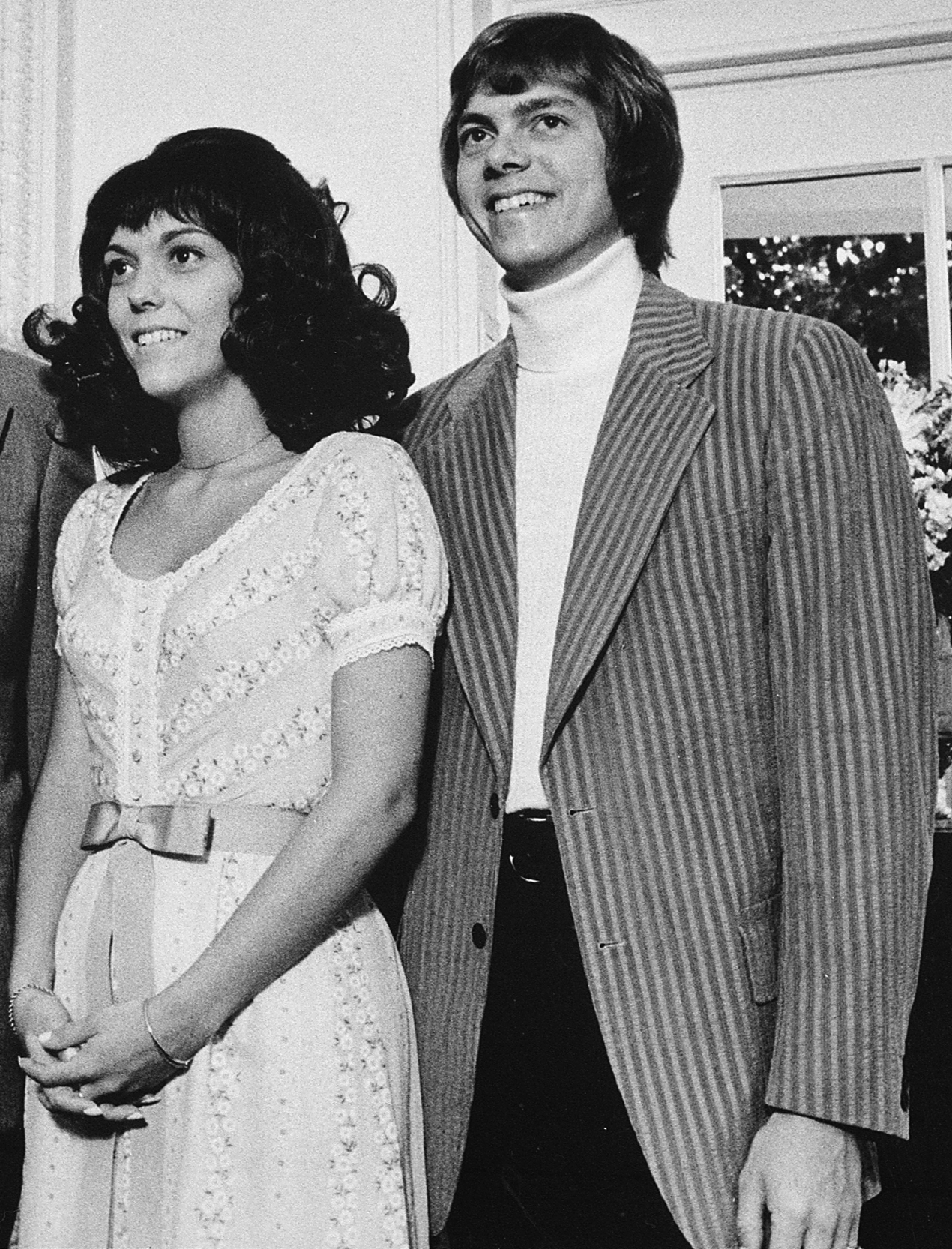
Tsai covered the Carpenters' song "I Won't Last a Day Without You" on the album.

On October 20, 2008, the lead track "I Won't Last a Day Without You" was released ahead of the album. The music video for the song, directed by Marlboro Lai, premiered on October 30. On November 23, 2008, the music video for "When You Say Nothing at All" was released, directed by Hooya Chen. However, Tsai did not appear in the video. On November 28, 208, Gold Typhoon issued a special edition of the album. In December 2008, the music video for "Lady Marmalade", directed by HooYa Production, was released, with Tsai again not participating in the video.

== Commercial performance ==
In its first week of release, the album topped the Western album sales charts at Taiwan's G-Music and Five Music stores. By December 31, 2008, despite minimal promotional efforts, the album's sales surpassed 30,000 copies. It ranked tenth and second on the 2008 annual Western album sales charts of G-Music and Five Music, respectively, and was recognized as the best-selling Western album in Taiwan for the year. Additionally, the track "I Won't Last a Day Without You" secured number seven on 2008 Hit FM Top 100 Singles chart.

== Critical reception ==
NetEase Entertainment commented, "Not only was there a six-month delay, but the album's production remains very faithful to the originals. The arrangements are traditional, and there is virtually no adaptation. It is straightforward and lacks any real innovation." The review also noted that, despite disappointing sales caused by delays in the approval process, the album's concept—selecting ten popular English love songs centered on Tsai's own experiences—offers valuable inspiration for other artists. The reinterpretations in the later stages successfully conveyed her personal insights and style. Tencent Entertainment criticized the album's production quality as insufficient and felt that the overly classic song selection contributed to a largely negative reception.

== Track listing ==
No.	Title	Writer(s)	Producer(s)	Length
1.	"Get the Party Started"	Linda Perry	Daniel Bi	3:52
2.	"Kiss Me"	Matt Slocum	Paul Lee	3:15
3.	"I Won't Last a Day Without You"	Roger Nichols; Paul Williams	Paula Ma	5:01
4.	"Physical"	Steve Kipner; Terry Shaddick	Adia	3:56
5.	"Angel"	Sarah McLachlan	Paula Ma	4:35
6.	"Lady Marmalade"	Bob Crewe; Kenny Nolan	Paula Ma	4:26
7.	"Lovefool"	Nina Persson; Peter Svensson	Jim Lee	3:17
8.	"The Blower's Daughter"	Damien Rice	Paula Ma	4:57
9.	"Thank You"	Dido Armstrong; Paul Herman	Peter Lee	3:34
10.	"When You Say Nothing at All"	Don Schlitz; Paul Overstreet	Peter Lee	4:16
Total length:				41:09

== Release history ==
Region	Date	Format	Edition	Distributor
Various	October 31, 2008	Streaming	Standard	Mars
China	October 31, 2008	CD	Standard	Push Typhoon
China	December 15, 2008	CD	Deluxe	Push Typhoon
China	February 9, 2009	CD	LOHAS	Push Typhoon
Taiwan	October 31, 2008	CD	Standard	Gold Typhoon
Taiwan	November 28, 2008	CD	LOHAS	Gold Typhoon
