= Equal in the Darkness =

Single by Steve Aoki, Jolin Tsai, and Max Schneider
- Released: October 21, 2021
- Genre: Dance
- Length: 7:00
- Label: Liquid State
- Songwriters: Teemu Brunila; Justin Philip Stein; Steve Aoki; Tian Chenming (Note: Mandarin version lyrics only)
- Producer: Steve Aoki

Steve Aoki singles chronology
"End of the World" (2021)	"Equal in the Darkness" (2021)	"Stars Don't Shine" (2021)

Jolin Tsai singles chronology
"Stars Align" (2021)	"Equal in the Darkness" (2021)	"Untitled" (2022)

Max Schneider singles chronology
"Butterflies" (2021)	"Equal in the Darkness" (2021)	"Wasabi" (2022)

Music video
- English version on YouTube; Mandarin version on YouTube

"Equal in the Darkness" (Chinese: 都沒差; pinyin: Dōu méi chā) is a song by American DJ and record producer Steve Aoki, Taiwanese singer Jolin Tsai, and American singer Max Schneider. The song was written by Teemu Brunila, Justin Philip Stein, Steve Aoki, and Tian Chenming, and produced by Aoki. It was released on October 21, 2021, by Liquid State in both Mandarin and English-language versions.

== Background ==
On July 29, 2021, Tsai revealed that she would soon release a new single. Later that day, Aoki and Schneider premiered a new track at Lollapalooza in Chicago, which featured Tsai's vocals. Both Tsai's Chinese and English names were prominently displayed on the stage backdrop. The single was originally scheduled for release on August 13, 2021, but was delayed due to scheduling adjustments, although production had been completed.

On October 19, 2021, Aoki confirmed that the collaboration would be released on October 21, 2021. Tsai announced that the track would be available in both a Mandarin and English version, and that the music video was in production.

== Composition ==
"Equal in the Darkness" revolves around the theme that "in darkness, we are all afraid; that very fear makes us equal." The lyrics reflect the fragility and vulnerability people feel in the face of fear and sorrow, while conveying a sense of universal shared experience. At the time of recording, Tsai was facing personal challenges and emotional lows, which inspired her to participate in the project. The song was originally composed as a ballad, and Tsai expressed excitement when Aoki transformed the demo into its final production. Due to time zone differences, Tsai worked late into the night, collaborating remotely with Aoki.

== Music video ==
On October 22, 2021, Aoki released a visualizer for the track on his YouTube channel, and announced that the official music video would be released the following week. A teaser for the official music video was uploaded on November 1, 2021, confirming a November 2, 2021 release (Pacific Time). Tsai also released a separate Mandarin version of the video on November 15, 2021, marking its premiere on her own channel.

The music video was shot in Los Angeles and Taipei, directed by Ariel Michelle. Due to travel restrictions, Michelle directed Tsai's scenes remotely via live video, marking Tsai's first time filming a music video under these conditions. The video portrays Tsai performing within a transparent glass enclosure, symbolizing being trapped by dark emotions, but eventually breaking free and embracing light and hope. Her two contrasting outfits in the video combine softness and strength, reinforcing the message that facing fear requires both vulnerability and courage.

== Other versions ==
On November 19, 2021, Aoki released a "Steve Aoki Character X" version of the song, which blends English vocals with the Chinese instrumental arrangement. A lyric video for this version was uploaded to YouTube on November 23, 2021. On December 3, 2021, a remix package titled "The Remixes" was released, featuring two additional remixes of the song.

== Commercial performance ==
The English version of the song ranked number 32 on Hit FM Top 100 Singles of 2021, while the Mandarin version followed closely at number 37 on the same list. Additionally, the track spent four weeks on Billboard's Dance/Mix Show Airplay chart, reaching a peak position of number 36.

== Critical reception ==
Taiwanese musician Tseng Jen-yi praised Tsai for her versatility in cross-genre collaborations, highlighting her ability to not only engage the Mandopop market but also push herself onto the international stage. Tseng noted that Tsai's efforts showcased both leadership and artistic courage.

== Awards ==
On November 30, 2021, "Equal in the Darkness" was nominated for Best Collaborative Single at the Asian Pop Music Awards. On July 8, 2023, the song won Cross-Border Collaboration Single of the Year at the 4th Tencent Music Entertainment Awards.

== Live performances ==
On July 29, 2021, Aoki and Schneider performed the song at Lollapalooza in Chicago, ahead of the track's official release.

== Track listing ==
- Digital download and streaming
1. "Equal in the Darkness" – 3:30
2. "Equal in the Darkness" (Mandarin version) – 3:30
- Digital download and streaming – "Equal in the Darkness" (Steve Aoki Character X version)
1. "Equal in the Darkness" (Steve Aoki Character X version) – 3:30
- Digital download and streaming – "Equal in the Darkness" (The remixes)
1. "Equal in the Darkness" (Gabry Ponte remix) – 3:01
2. "Equal in the Darkness" (Crazy Donkey remix) – 3:03

== Charts ==
=== Weekly charts ===
Chart (2021–2022)	Peak position
China (Tencent)	59
US Dance/Mix Show Airplay (Billboard)	36

== Release history ==
Release dates and formats for "Equal in the Darkness"
Region	Date	Version	Format(s)	Distributor
Various	October 21, 2021	Original	Digital download; streaming	Liquid State
Various	November 19, 2021	Steve Aoki Character X version	Digital download; streaming	Liquid State
Various	December 3. 2021	The remixes	Digital download; streaming	Liquid State
