= Untitled (Jolin Tsai song) =

Single by Jolin Tsai
- Language: Mandarin
- Released: December 9, 2022
- Studio: BB Road (Taipei)
- Genre: Pop
- Length: 4:54
- Label: Sony; Eternal
- Composers: Jolin Tsai; Kay Liu
- Lyricists: Vison Chen; David Ke
- Producers: Jolin Tsai; Howe Chen

Jolin Tsai singles chronology
"Equal in the Darkness" (2021)	"Untitled" (2022)	"Someday, Somewhere" (2023)

Music video
- "Untitled" on YouTube

"Untitled" (Chinese: 親愛的對象; pinyin: Qīn'ài de duìxiàng) is a song by Taiwanese singer Jolin Tsai, written by Tsai, Kay Liu, Vision Chen, and David Ke, and produced by Tsai and Howe Chen. The track was released as a single on December 9, 2022, by Sony and serves as the theme song for the Taiwanese film Marry My Dead Body (2023). The song earned a nomination for Best Original Film Song at the 60th Golden Horse Awards.

== Background ==
On October 5, 2022, Tsai was seen leaving a nightclub in Taipei's Xinyi District, sparking speculation about a new project. Her manager clarified that she had been filming content for an upcoming release. In early November 2022, media reports confirmed that Tsai would release a new single to serve as the theme for a film.

On December 4, 2022, the production team for Marry My Dead Body (2023) teased that the theme song would be sung by a female artist known for keeping pet dogs, leading to speculation that Tsai was the artist in question.

On December 8, 2022, Tsai officially confirmed she had recorded the song, titled "Untitled", which would be released at midnight on December 9, 2022, with its music video premiering at noon the same day. Tsai also hosted a livestream alongside director Cheng Wei-hao and actor Austin Lin to share insights into the creative process.

== Composition and recording ==
Tsai was invited by film director Cheng Wei-hao to perform the theme song a year prior to the release. After reading the screenplay and viewing rough footage of the film, Tsai decided to compose the song herself. She immersed herself in the emotional nuances of the script, experimenting with unconventional ideas. Though Tsai initially doubted whether her composition met the director's expectations, she ultimately produced a version that both she and the director were satisfied with.

Musically, the song blends elements of urban contemporary, featuring ethereal piano passages, dance rhythms, and subtle synthesizer flourishes. The track explores the uncertainties of love, transitioning into a tone of conviction and understanding.

== Title ==
The Chinese title uses the word "object" to signify relationships that defy conventional definitions or labels, emphasizing a love that evolves over time into something more profound, such as family, friends, or partners. The English title, "Untitled", embodies the idea of a relationship that transcends formal categories, allowing for a more open and inclusive view of human connection. Tsai highlighted the universality of love, where individuals can define their relationships in their own terms.

== Release ==
The song reached number 5 on the Billboard Taiwan Songs Chart on December 24, 2022, and later peaked at number 14 on the Metro Radio Hits Pop Chart on January 14, 2023. It also ranked number 18 on Hit FM Top 100 Singles of the Year on January 19, 2023.

== Music video ==
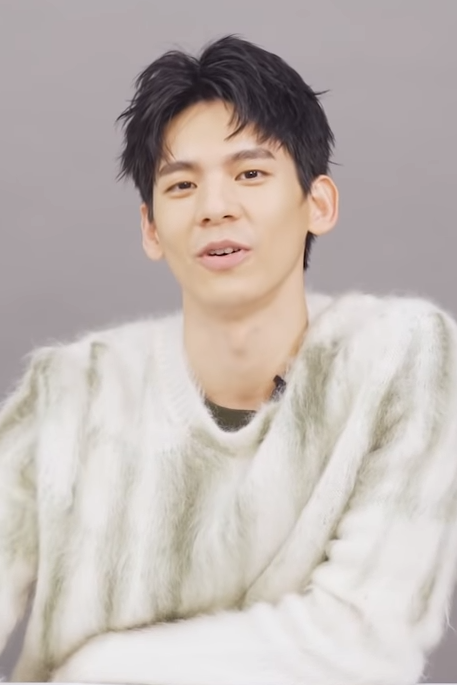
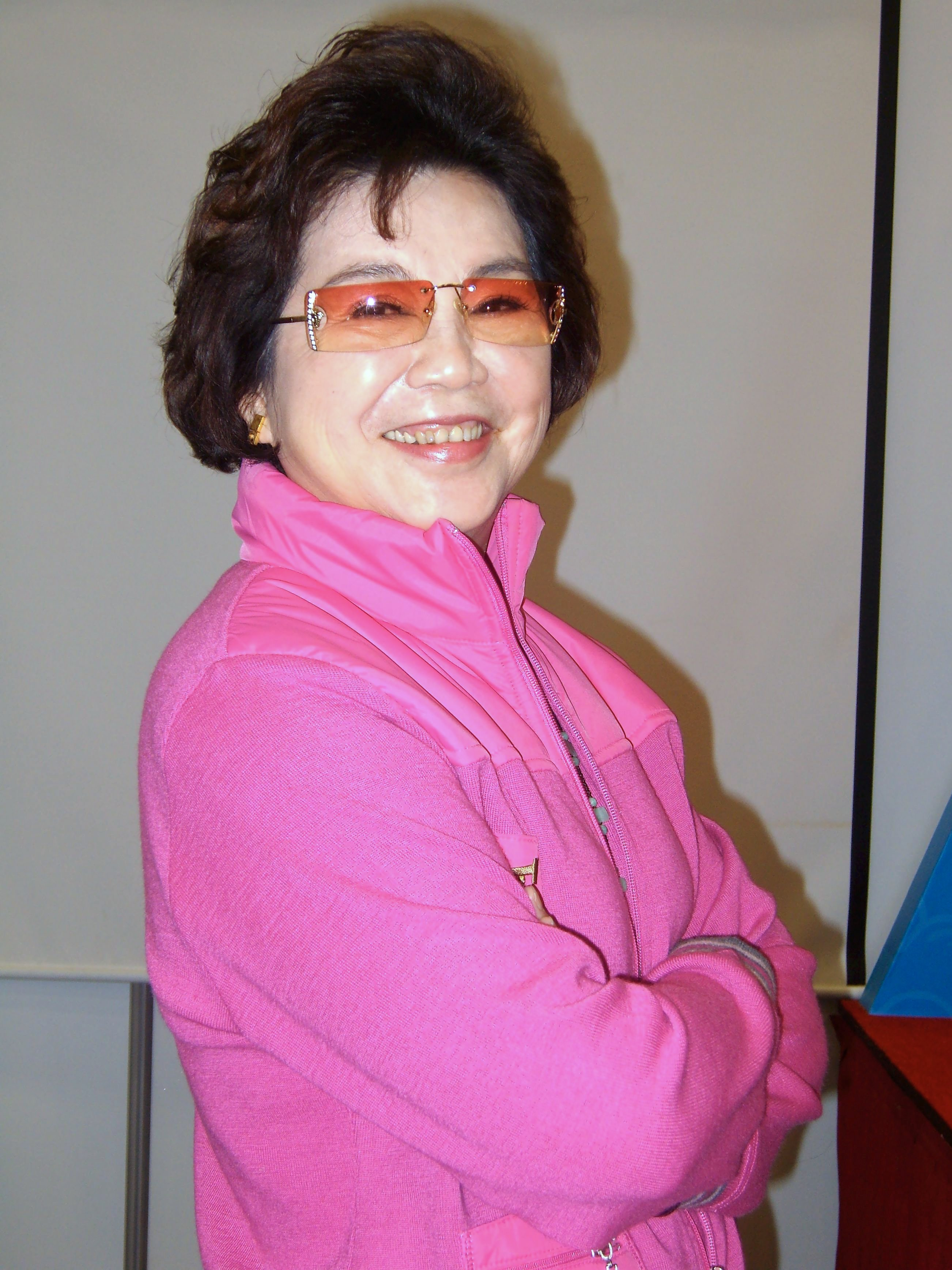
Austin Lin (left) and Wang Man-chiao (right) appear in the music video.

Directed by Yin Chen-hao, the music video for "Untitled" stars actor Austin Lin and veteran actress Wang Man-chiao. The video depicts the emotional journey between a grandson, Mao-mao (Lin), and his grandmother (Wang). Tsai plays a DJ, symbolizing a catalyst for reconciliation between the two characters. The video, conceived as a prequel to Marry My Dead Body (2023), explores the theme of "coming out", both in terms of sexual identity and sharing one's deepest emotions with loved ones. The closing scene, featuring a silent, poignant exchange between grandmother and grandson, symbolizes acceptance and mutual understanding.

== Critical reception ==
Musician Joey Lou praised the song as a distinctive ballad, emphasizing its atmospheric verses, clear chorus rhythm, and the steadily building emotional intensity.

== Awards ==
On June 3, 2023, "Untitled" won Most Popular Digital Single at the Hito Music Awards. On October 3, 2023, it was nominated for Best Original Film Song at the 60th Golden Horse Awards.

== Trivia ==
During the selection process for the 34th Golden Melody Awards, the song was shortlisted from over 4,000 entries for Song of the Year. Though it did not make the final nomination list, it was one of the most discussed "snubs" of the ceremony.

== Live performances ==
On June 19, 2023, Tsai performed "Untitled" live on the Japanese YouTube music channel The First Take.

== Charts ==
=== Weekly charts ===
Chart (2022–2023)	Peak position
Taiwan (Billboard)	5

== Credits and personnel ==
Credits are adapted from the description of the music video for "Untitled" on YouTube.

Music

- Jolin Tsai – production, background vocals, vocoder
- Howe Chen – production, drum sampling, bass, synthesizer, vocoder
- Lin Jie – piano, bass, synthesizer, production assistance
- Shivia Lee – background vocal arrangement
- Yeh Yu-hsuan – recording engineering
- BB Road Studio – recording studio
- Joe Grasso – mixing engineering
- The Brewery Recording Studio – mixing studio
- Shen Kuan-lin – production assistance

Video

- Spacebar Studio – production
- Huang Shih-hsuan – executive production
- Lin Chin-erh – executive production
- Huang Fu-lei – administrative coordination
- Yin Chen-hao – direction
- Lin Yu-ling – assistant direction
- Shih Yu-chuan – assistant direction
- Austin Lin – starring
- Wang Man-chiao – starring

== Release history ==
Release dates and formats for "Untitled"
Region	Date	Format(s)	Distributor
Various	2022年12月9日	Digital download; streaming	Sony
China	2022年12月9日	Streaming	YDX
