= Jolin Tsai videography =

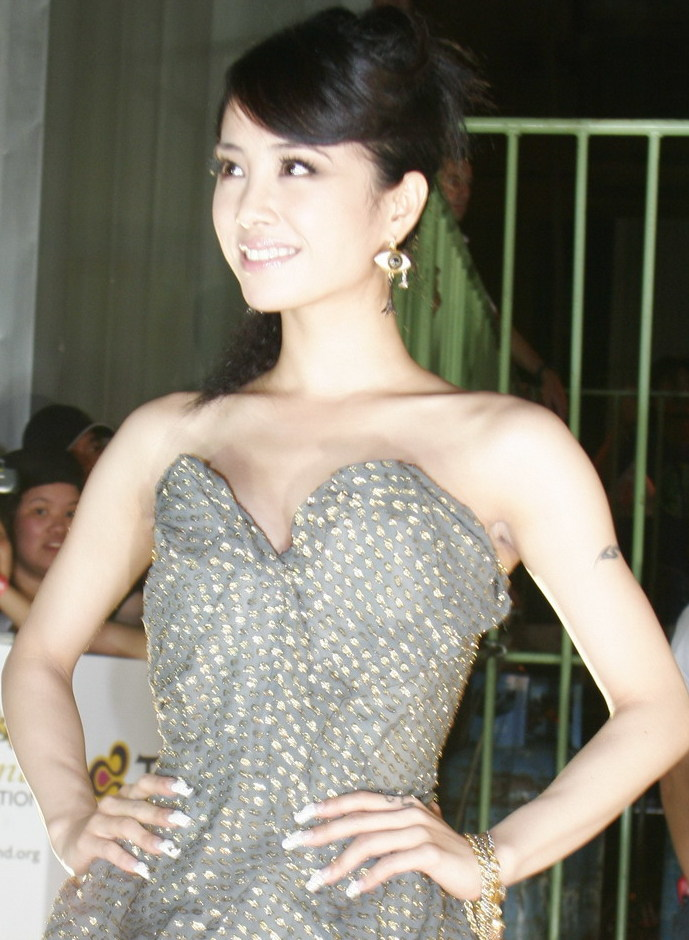
- Tsai on the red carpet of the MTV Asia Awards at Bangkok in May 2006
- Music videos: 194
- Video albums: 33
- Video singles: 4

Taiwanese singer Jolin Tsai has released a total of 194 music videos, 33 video albums, and 4 video singles to date. In 2000, she released the concert video 1019 I Can Concert. That same year, she also released the music video compilation Don't Stop Karaoke. In 2001, she released the concert video Show Your Love Concert and the music video compilation Show Your Love Karaoke. In 2002, she issued the music video compilation Lucky Number Karaoke.

In 2005, she released the concert tour video J1 Live Concert. In 2007, she released the documentary video If You Think You Can, You Can!. In 2009, she issued the concert video Love & Live. In 2013, she released the concert tour video Myself World Tour, and in 2018, she released the concert tour video Play World Tour.

== Music videos ==
=== 1990s ===
Title	Year	Director(s)	Album	Ref.
"I Know You're Feeling Blue"	1999	Chou Ko-tai	1019	
"Because of You"	1999	Unknown	1019	
"Blame It on the Age"	1999	Marlboro Lai	1019	
"Good-Bye"	1999	Tony Lin	1019	
"The Rose"	1999	Chou Ko-tai	1019	
"Living with the World"	1999	Unknown	1019	
"Guessing"	1999	Unknown	1019	
"Emptiness"	1999	Tony Lin	1019	
"Who Are You"	1999	Unknown	1019	
"Out on the Street"	1999	Unknown	1019	

=== 2000s ===
Title	Year	Director(s)	Album	Ref.
"Don't Stop"	2000	Tony Lin	Don't Stop	
"Are You Happy"	2000	Tony Lin	Don't Stop	
"You Gotta Know"	2000	Kuang Sheng	Don't Stop	
"What Kind of Love"	2000	JP Huang	Don't Stop	
"Sugar Sugar"	2000	Show×2	Don't Stop	
"Eternity"	2000	Unknown	Don't Stop	
"Everything's Gonna Be Alright"	2000	Unknown	Don't Stop	
"Love Song for You"	2000	Unknown	Don't Stop	
"Show Your Love"	2000	Tony Lin	Show Your Love	
"Do You Still Love Me"	2000	Kuang Sheng	Show Your Love	
"Feel Your Presence"	2001	Ma I-chung	Show Your Love	
"Fall in Love with a Street"	2001	Ma I-chung	Show Your Love	
"Reluctant"	2001	Ma I-chung	Show Your Love	
"Baby Face"	2001	Unknown	Show Your Love	
"Pretty Pretty Day"	2001	Unknown	Show Your Love	
"If You Said Love Me at That Day"	2001	Unknown	Show Your Love	
"Love Is Near"	2001	Unknown	Show Your Love	
"See at a Glance"	2001	Unknown	Show Your Love	
"Where the Dream Takes You"	2001	Marlboro Lai	Atlantis: The Lost Empire	
"If Don't Want"	2001	Chin Cho	Lucky Number	
"Lucky Number"	2001	Milo Hsu	Lucky Number	
"Can't Speak Clearly"	2001	P×3	Lucky Number	
"Bridge over Troubled Water"	2001	Marlboro Lai	Lucky Number	
"Take It Easy"	2001	Unknown	Lucky Number	
"By Me"	2001	Unknown	Lucky Number	
"Surprise"	2001	Unknown	Lucky Number	
"Watch Me Closely"	2001	P×3	Lucky Number	
"Only One of You"	2001	Unknown	Lucky Number	
"Catcher"	2001	P×3	Lucky Number	
"The Spirit of Knight"	2002	Tony Lin	Magic	
"Magic"	2003	Kuang Sheng	Magic	
"Fake Confess"	2003	Tony Lin	Magic	
"Say Love You"	2003	Kuang Sheng	Magic	
"Prague Square"	2003	Chen Hung-bin	Magic	
"Be You for a Day"	2003	Tony Lin	Magic	
"Rope on Vest"	2003	Tony Lin	Magic	
"Slave Ship"	2003	Unknown	Magic	
"Smell of the Popcorn"	2003	Unknown	Magic	
"Prove It"	2003	Unknown	Magic	
"Good Thing"	2003	Unknown	Magic	
"Angel of Love" (with Andy On)	2003	Unknown	Why Me, Sweetie?! Original Sound Track	
"Darkness"	2003	Unknown	Why Me, Sweetie?! Original Sound Track	
"Sweetie"	2003	Unknown	Why Me, Sweetie?! Original Sound Track	
"Hand in Hand" (with various artists)	2003	Unknown	—N/a	
"Warriors in Peace"	2003	Unknown	Warriors of Heaven and Earth Original Motion Picture Soundtrack	
"Pirates"	2004	Marlboro Lai	Castle	
"36 Tricks of Love"	2004	Kuang Sheng	Castle	
"It's Love"	2004	Marlboro Lai	Castle	
"The Smell of Lemon Grass"	2004	Tony Lin	Castle	
"Love Love Love"	2004	Marlboro Lai & Bill Chia	Castle	
"The Starter"	2004	Tony Lin	Castle	
"Disappearing Castle"	2004	Unknown	Castle	
"Nice Cat"	2004	Unknown	Castle	
"Priority"	2004	Unknown	Castle	
"Rewind"	2004	Unknown	Castle	
"Dare for More" (with various artists)	2004	Unknown	—N/a	
"Signature Gesture"	2004	Marlboro Lai & Bill Chia	J9	
"Single Harm"	2004	Jimmy Chou	J9	
"J9 Magic Non-Stop Remix"	2004	Unknown	J9	
"J-Game"	2005	Marlboro Lai & Bill Chia	J-Game	
"Sky"	2005	JP Huang	J-Game	
"Overlooking Purposely"	2005	Kuang Sheng	J-Game	
"Greek Girl by the Wishing Fountain"	2005	Marlboro Lai & Bill Chia	J-Game	
"Exclusive Myth"	2005	Kuang Sheng	J-Game	
"Repeated Note"	2005	Marlboro Lai	J-Game	
"Missing You"	2005	Marlboro Lai	J-Game	
"Sweet and Sour"	2005	Unknown	J-Game	
"Oh Oh"	2005	Unknown	J-Game	
"Hunting Cupid"	2005	Unknown	J-Game	
"Under the Sea"	2005	Unknown	Hong Kong Disneyland the Grand Opening Celebration Album	
"Destined Guy" (Show Lo featuring Jolin Tsai)	2005	Marlboro Lai	Hypnosis Show	
"Paradise"	2005	Marlboro Lai & Bill Chia	J1 Live Concert	
"Attraction of Sexy Lips"	2005	Marlboro Lai	Dancing Diva	
"My Choice"	2006	Chin Cho	J-Top	
"Clothing Astrology"	2006	Bill Chia	J-Top	
"J-Top Hits"	2006	Unknown	J-Top	
"Dancing Diva"	2006	Marlboro Lai & Bill Chia	Dancing Diva	
"Pretence"	2006	Leste Chen	Dancing Diva	
"A Wonder in Madrid"	2006	Terry & Friends	Dancing Diva	
"Mr. Q"	2006	Kuang Sheng	Dancing Diva	
"The Prologue"	2006	May Wen	Dancing Diva	
"Pulchritude"	2006	Marlboro Lai	Dancing Diva	
"Nice Guy" (featuring Stanley Huang)	2006	Chen Hung-i	Dancing Diva	
"Love in the Shape of a Heart"	2006	May Wen	Dancing Diva	
"Heart Breaking Day"	2006	May Wen	Dancing Diva	
"The Finale"	2006	JP Huang	Dancing Diva	
"Marry Me Today" (David Tao featuring Jolin Tsai)	2006	Tony Lin	Beautiful	
"Dancing Forever"	2006	Jeff Chang	Dancing Forever	
"Missing You"	2006	Marlboro Lai	Dancing Forever	
"Dare to Go to the Cemetery"	2006	Marlboro Lai	Dancing Forever	
"Heard That Love's Ever Been Back"	2006	Marlboro Lai	Dancing Forever	
"Agent J"	2007	Jeff Chang	Agent J	
"Bravo Lover"	2007	Marlboro Lai	Agent J	
"Alone"	2007	Jeff Chang	Agent J	
"Sun Will Never Set"	2007	Marlboro Lai	Agent J	
"Fear-Free"	2007	Jeff Chang	Agent J	
"Tacit Violence"	2007	Kuang Sheng	Agent J	
"Priceless"	2007	Kuang Sheng	Agent J	
"Ideal State"	2007	Marlboro Lai	Agent J	
"Metronome"	2007	Marlboro Lai	Agent J	
"Golden Triangle"	2007	Kuang Sheng	Agent J	
"Let's Move It"	2007	Marlboro Lai	Agent J	
"Beijing Welcomes You" (with various artists)	2008	Unknown	The Official Album for Beijing 2008 Olympic Games	
"I Won't Last a Day Without You"	2008	Marlboro Lai	Love Exercise	
"When You Say Nothing at All"	2008	Hooya Chen	Love Exercise	
"Lady Marmalade"	2008	Hooya	Love Exercise	
"Hauteur"	2009	Unknown	Jeneation	
"Habitual Betrayal"	2009	Unknown	Jeneation	
"Real Man" (featuring Nick Chou)	2009	Marlboro Lai	Butterfly	
"Compromise"	2009	Hsu Yun-hsuan	Butterfly	
"Butterfly"	2009	Marlboro Lai	Butterfly	
"Slow Life"	2009	Marlboro Lai	Butterfly	
"Accompany with Me"	2009	Hsu Yun-ting	Butterfly	
"Love Attraction"	2009	Unknown	Butterfly	
"The Shadow Dancer"	2009	Unknown	Butterfly	
"Parachute"	2009	Unknown	Butterfly	
"You Hurt My Feelings"	2009	Unknown	Butterfly	
"Hot Winter"	2009	Unknown	Butterfly	
"Change the Future" (with various artists)	2009	Unknown	—N/a	

=== 2010s ===
Title	Year	Director(s)	Album	Ref.
"There Is a Tiger" (with various artists)	2010	Unknown	—N/a	
"Heartbeat of Taiwan"	2010	Unknown	—N/a	
"Honey Trap"	2010	Cha Eun Teak	Myself	
"Love Player"	2010	Marlboro Lai	Myself	
"Nothing Left to Say"	2010	Bill Chia	Myself	
"Butterflies in My Stomach"	2010	Marlboro Lai	Myself	
"Take Immediate Action"	2010	Marlboro Lai	Myself	
"Real Hurt"	2010	Sam Hu	Myself	
"Black-Haired Beautiful Girl"	2010	Kuang Sheng	Myself	
"The Great Artist"	2012	Muh Chen	Muse	
"Wandering Poet"	2012	JP Huang	Muse	
"Dr. Jolin"	2012	Marlboro Lai	Muse	
"Mosaic"	2012	Chen Hung-i	Muse	
"Spying on You Behind the Fence"	2012	Jude Chen	Muse	
"Fantasy"	2012	Bill Chia	Muse	
"I"	2012	Fu Tien-yu	Muse	
"Color Photos"	2012	Jude Chen	Muse	
"Friday the 13th"	2012	Unknown	Muse	
"Beast"	2012	Bill Chia	Muse	
"Journey"	2013	Bill Chia	—N/a	
"Now Is the Time"	2014	Muh Chen	Pepsi Beats of the Beautiful Game	
"Kaleidoscope"	2014	Unknown	—N/a	
"Shake Your Body" (with various artists)	2014	Muh Chen	—N/a	
"Be Wonderful Together"	2014	Dennis Liu	—N/a	
"Phony Queen"	2014	Jeff Chang	Play	
"Play"	2014	Muh Chen	Play	
"The Third Person and I"	2014	Fu Tien-yu	Play	
"Medusa"	2014	Jennifer Wu	Play	
"We're All Different, Yet the Same"	2014	Hou Chi-jan	Play	
"Gentlewomen"	2014	Scott Beardslee & Kitty Lin	Play	
"Lip Reading"	2014	Thomas Wyatt & Edwin Eversole	Play	
"I'm Not Yours" (featuring Namie Amuro)	2014	Muh Chen	Play	
"I Love, I Embrace"	2014	Thomas Wyatt & Edwin Eversole	Play	
"I Wanna Know" (Alesso featuring Jolin Tsai)	2016	Unknown	—N/a	
"Ego-Holic" (Starr Chen featuring Jolin Tsai)	2016	Hsieh Yu-en	Welcome to the Next Level	
"Give Love"	2017	Hi-Organic	—N/a	
"On Happiness Road"	2017	Sung Hsin-yin	—N/a	
"Stand Up"	2017	Muh Chen	—N/a	
"The Player"	2018	Wise Mind	—N/a	
"Sun Will Never Set" (DNF Apocalypse version) (with various artists)	2018	Unknown	—N/a	
"Ugly Beauty"	2018	Muh Chen	Ugly Beauty	
"Happy New Year Do Re Mi" (with Liu Yuning and various artists)	2019	Zou Fei	—N/a	
"Hubby"	2019	Jeff Chang	Ugly Beauty	
"Womxnly"	2019	Ryan Parma	Ugly Beauty	
"Life Sucks"	2019	Jeff Chang	Ugly Beauty	
"Lady in Red"	2019	Cheng Wei-hao	Ugly Beauty	
"Karma"	2019	Remii Huang	Ugly Beauty	
"Romance"	2019	Cheng Wei-hao	Ugly Beauty	

=== 2020s ===
Title	Year	Director(s)	Album	Ref.
"Fight as One" (with Eason Chan)	2020	Tan Ke & Fu Jing	—N/a	
"Who Am I" (with Jony J)	2020	Unknown	The Wolf Original Television Series Soundtrack	
"Opposite"	2020	Unknown	The Wolf Original Television Series Soundtrack	
"Sweet Guilty Pleasure"	2020	Leo Liao	Ugly Beauty	
"Stars Align" (with R3hab)	2021	Muh Chen	—N/a	
"Equal in the Darkness" (with Steve Aoki and MAX)	2021	Ariel Michelle	—N/a	
"Equal in the Darkness" (Mandarin version) (with Steve Aoki and MAX)	2021	Ariel Michelle	—N/a	
"Untitled"	2022	Yin Chen-hao	—N/a	
"Someday, Somewhere"	2023	Unknown	—N/a	
"Oh La La La"	2023	Dawson Pon	—N/a	
"Sun Will Never Set" (Mars version)	2024	Curry Tian	—N/a	
"Pleasure"	2025	Christian Breslauer	Pleasure	
"DIY"	2025	Christian Breslauer	Pleasure	
"Pillow"	2025	Jeremy Qin	Pleasure	
"Fish Love"	2025	Rodrigo Inada	Pleasure	
"Prague Square" (Jolin version)	2026	Birdy Nio	—N/a	
"Emoji" (with SB19)	2026	Alan Ante Jr. & John Vladimir Manalo	Wakas at Simula	

=== Cameo appearances ===
Title	Artist(s)	Year	Director(s)	Album	Ref.
"$$$"	Edison Chen featuring FAMA	2008	Vernie Yeung	—N/a	
"Party Boy"	Show Lo	2008	Marlboro Lai & Show Lo	Trendy Man	

== Video albums ==
Title	Release details	Description
1019 (3rd edition)	Released: December 13, 1999; Label: Universal · D Sound; Format: CD+VCD	The edition contains six music videos from 1019 and one documentary film.
1019 (4th edition)	Released: January 15, 2000; Label: Universal · D Sound; Format: CD+VCD	The edition contains six music videos from 1019 and one documentary film.
1019 I Can Concert	Released: March 16, 2000; Label: Universal · D Sound; Format: VCD	The release chronicles the 1019 I Can Concert in Taipei on December 4, 1999.
Don't Stop (3rd edition)	Released: July 11, 2000; Label: Universal · D Sound; Format: CD+VCD	The edition contains three music videos from Don't Stop and three live videos of the Don't Stop Concert in Taipei on April 16, 2000.
Don't Stop Karaoke	Released: September 5, 2000; Label: Universal · D Sound; Format: VCD · 2VCD · 2DVD	The release has three versions, the DVD version contains 17 music videos from 1019 and Don't Stop, the VCD version contains 12 music videos from 1019 and Don't Stop, and the 2VCD version contains the content of 1019 I Can Concert in addition to the content of the VCD version.
Show Your Love (3rd edition)	Released: March 16, 2001; Label: Universal · D Sound; Format: CD+VCD	The edition contains two music videos from Show Your Love and three live videos of the Show Your Love Concert.
Show Your Love Concert	Released: May 10, 2001; Label: Universal · D Sound; Format: 2VCD	The release chronicles the Show Your Love Concert in Panchiao on February 25, 2001.
Show Your Love Karaoke	Released: August 13, 2001; Label: Universal · D Sound; Format: VCD	The release contains ten music videos from Show Your Love and five commercials of Tsaio.
Together	Released: November 6, 2001; Label: Universal · D Sound; Format: CD+VCD	The release contains 14 music videos released during Universal era and one behind-the-scenes documentary film about Lucky Number.
Lucky Number Karaoke	Released: March 21, 2002; Label: Universal · D Sound; Format: VCD	The release contains nine music videos from Lucky Number and six commercials of Mobitai Communications.
Magic (deluxe edition)	Released: May 23, 2003; Label: Sony; Format: CD+DVD	The edition contains 11 music videos from Magic.
Castle	Released: February 27, 2004; Label: Sony; Format: CD+VCD	The release contains one documentary film.
Castle (deluxe edition)	Released: April 30, 2004; Label: Sony; Format: CD+DVD	The edition contains ten music videos from Castle.
Born to Be a Star	Released: November 12, 2004; Label: Universal · D Sound; Format: 2CD+DVD	The release contains 15 music videos released during Universal era.
J-Game (deluxe edition)	Released: July 8, 2005; Label: Sony BMG; Format: CD+DVD	The edition contains ten music videos from J-Game.
J1 Live Concert	Released: September 23, 2005; Label: Sony BMG; Format: 2CD+DVD	The release chronicles the Taipei date of the J1 World Tour on November 20, 2004 and two behind-the-scenes documentary films.
J-Top	Released: May 5, 2006; Label: Sony BMG; Format: 2CD+DVD	The release contains four music videos released during Sony era and one documentary film.
Dancing Diva (Perfect Celebration edition)	Released: July 7, 2006; Label: EMI · Mars; Format: CD+DVD	The edition contains 11 music videos from Dancing Diva.
Dancing Forever	Released: September 29, 2006; Label: EMI · Mars; Format: 2CD+DVD	The release chronicles the Pulchritude Concert in Kaohsiung on July 1, 2006
If You Think You Can, You Can!	Released: June 8, 2007; Label: EMI; Format: DVD	The release chronicles the Taipei dates of the Dancing Forever World Tour from November 17 to 19, 2006, one documentary film, and four music videos from Dancing Forever.
Final Wonderland	Released: September 19, 2007; Label: Sony BMG; Format: 3CD+DVD	The release contains 22 music videos released during Sony era.
Agent J (limited edition)	Released: September 21, 2007; Label: EMI · Mars; Format: CD+DVD	The edition contains the film, Agent J (2007).
Agent J (Champion special edition)	Released: October 26, 2007; Label: EMI · Mars; Format: CD+DVD	The edition contains ten music videos and four dance performance videos from Agent J.
Agent J (special celebration edition)	Released: December 7, 2007; Label: EMI · Mars; Format: CD+DVD	The edition chronicles the Agent J Concert in Tamsui on October 21, 2007 and one music video from Agent J.
Butterfly	Released: March 27, 2009; Label: Warner · Mars; Format: CD+DVD	The release contains two dance performance videos from Butterfly and two dance tutorial videos.
Butterfly (deluxe edition)	Released: May 22, 2009; Label: Warner · Mars; Format: CD+DVD	The edition contains five music videos from Butterfly.
Love & Live	Released: October 9, 2009; Label: Warner · Mars; Format: CD+2DVD	The release chronicles the Butterfly Concert in Taichung on May 9, 2009 and the Slow Life Concert in Taipei on May 24, 2009.
Myself (Take 2 – Dance with Me edition)	Released: October 29, 2010; Label: Warner · Mars; Format: CD+DVD	The edition contains six music videos from Myself and one behind-the-scenes documentary film.
Ultimate	Released: August 28, 2012; Label: Sony; Format: 2CD+DVD	The release contains nine music videos released during Sony era and one live video of the J1 World Tour in Taipei on November 20, 2004.
Muse (special limited edition)	Released: October 26, 2012; Label: Warner · Mars; Format: CD+2DVD	The edition contains five music video from Muse and chronicles the Muse Concert in Tainan on October 6, 2012.
Myself World Tour	Released: October 19, 2013; Label: Warner · Mars; Format: 2DVD · 3DVD	The release chronicles the Taipei dates of the Myself World Tour from December 22 to 23, 2012 and the music video of "Journey".
Play (Replay deluxe international edition)	Released: February 6, 2015; Label: Warner · Eternal; Format: CD+DVD	The edition contains nine music video from Play.
Play World Tour	Released: January 30, 2018; Label: Warner · Eternal; Format: 2DVD · BD	The release chronicles the Taipei dates of the Play World Tour from May 22 to 25, 2015, four We're All Different, Yet the Same documentary films, and one behind-the-scenes documentary film.

== Video singles ==
Title	Release details
"Attraction of Sexy Lips"	Released: December 30, 2005; Label: Mars; Format: CD
"Pulchritude"	Released: June 20, 2006; Label: EMI · Mars; Format: VCD
"Heartbeat of Taiwan"	Released: April 27, 2010; Label: Warner · Mars; Format: DVD
"Journey"	Released: September 11, 2013; Label: Warner · Mars; Format: CD+DVD
