= Final Wonderland =

2007 greatest hits album by Jolin Tsai

Greatest hits album by Jolin Tsai
- Released: September 19, 2007
- Genre: Pop; dance
- Length: 4:15:14
- Label: Sony BMG
- Producer: Jamie Hsueh; Bing Wang; Huang Yi; Jay Chou; Peter Lee; Jack Chou; Adia; G-Power

Jolin Tsai chronology
If You Think You Can, You Can! (2007)	Final Wonderland (2007)	Agent J (2007)

Final Wonderland (Chinese: 夢綺地) is a greatest hits compilation album by Taiwanese singer Jolin Tsai, released by Sony BMG on September 19, 2007. The album features 40 songs from Tsai's Sony era, along with 22 music videos and two remix medleys.

== Commercial performance ==
In its first week of release, the album ranked number 18 on G-Music's weekly sales chart and number 19 on Five Music's weekly sales chart in Taiwan.

== Critical reception ==
Tencent Entertainment noted that this compilation was released just two days before Agent J (2007), marking Tsai's third showdown between her former and current record labels. The album not only gathered popular hits but also included nearly all of her Sony-era tracks. Surprisingly, it offered three CDs and one DVD at the price of a single album. However, due to the heavy reliance on previously released material and a lack of fresh content, it failed to replicate the success of J-Top (2006), ultimately fading quickly from public attention.

Sina Music's review acknowledged the album's appeal but also pointed out some shortcomings. The main issue was that since EMI had already released Dancing Diva (2006) and Sony BMG had issued J-Top featuring many older songs, this new greatest hits album held less appeal for fans who already owned those releases. Nevertheless, for listeners who had not purchased J-Top or Tsai's Sony-era albums, it remained a worthwhile choice.

== Track listing ==
Final Wonderland – CD 1
No.	Title	Lyrics	Music	Producer(s)	Length
1.	"J-Start remix" (Paradise / Magic / Signature Gesture / J-Game)	Issac Chen	Jemma Griffiths; Gerard B. Young Jr.; Johann Sebastian Bach; Ward Swingle; Edward Chan; Charles Lee; Jonas Nordelius; Andreas Levander; Awa Manneh		6:36
2.	"Hot-J remix" (36 Tricks of Love / Overlooking Purposely / Prague Square / Love Love Love)	Kiki Hu; Sunny Lee; Francis Lee; Vincent Fang; Simon Liang	Savan Kotecha; Andrew Frampton; Wayne Wilkins; Mads Hauge; Vincent DeGiorgio; Jay Chou; Konstantin Meladze		6:43
3.	"Magic"	Issac Chen	Edward Chan; Charles Lee	Bing Wang	3:46
4.	"Signature Gesture"	Issac Chen	Edward Chan; Charles Lee	Jamie Hsueh	3:12
5.	"J-Game"	Issac Chen	Jonas Nordelius; Andreas Levander; Awa Manneh	Bing Wang	3:51
6.	"36 Tricks of Love"	Kiki Hu	Savan Kotecha; Andrew Frampton; Wayne Wilkins	Bing Wang	3:34
7.	"Prove It"	Kevin Yi	George Samuelson; Michael Lundh; Quint Starkie; Allan Rich	Huang Yi	3:39
8.	"Nice Cat"	Issac Chen	Anna Lidner; Charles Kwashie Tamakloe	Bing Wang	3:32
9.	"Overlooking Purposely"	Sunny Lee; Francis Lee	Mads Hauge; Vincent DeGiorgio	Jamie Hsueh	2:59
10.	"Hunting Cupid"	Jack Chou	Edward Chan; Charles Lee	Jamie Hsueh	3:20
11.	"Priority"	Francis Lee	Dawn Joseph; Henry Gorman	Bing Wang	3:34
12.	"Smell of the Popcorn"	Vincent Fang	Wan Chiu	Bing Wang	4:20
13.	"Good Thing"	Francis Lee	George Samuelson; Michael Lundh; Quint Starkie; Rebecca Hortlund	Huang Yi	3:15
Total length:					52:21

Final Wonderland – CD 2
No.	Title	Lyrics	Music	Producer(s)	Length
1.	"Paradise"	Issac Chen	Jemma Griffiths; Gerard B. Young Jr.; Johann Sebastian Bach; Ward Swingle	Jamie Hsueh	3:14
2.	"The Spirit of Knight"	Jolin Tsai	Jay Chou	Jay Chou	4:17
3.	"Prague Square"	Vincent Fang	Jay Chou	Jay Chou	4:54
4.	"Love Love Love"	Simon Liang	Konstantin Meladze	Huang Yi	3:48
5.	"Greek Girl by the Wishing Pond"	Alang Huang	Ivana Wong	Jamie Hsueh	3:10
6.	"Pirates"	Issac Chen	Jay Chou	Jay Chou	4:35
7.	"Exclusive Myth"	Issac Chen	Wang Leehom	Jack Chou	4:10
8.	"Oh Oh"	Issac Chen	Jonas Nordelius; Andreas Levander; Jeanette Olsson	Jack Chou	3:09
9.	"Say Love You"	Simon Liang	Jay Chou	Bing Wang	3:46
10.	"Single Harm"	Francis Lee	Kang Hyun-min	Jamie Hsueh	3:44
11.	"It's Love"	Simon Liang	Jay Chou	Bing Wang	4:16
12.	"Clothing Astrology"	Francis Lee	Jonas Nordelius; Andreas Levander; Marcus Dernulf	Bing Wang	3:41
Total length:					46:44

Final Wonderland – CD 3
No.	Title	Lyrics	Music	Producer(s)	Length
1.	"Sky"	Wesley Chia; Kiki Hu	Wesley Chia	Adia	4:38
2.	"Repeated Note"	Jolin Tsai	Jamie Hsueh	Jamie Hsueh	4:24
3.	"Sweet and Sour"	Francis Lee	Jamie Hsueh	Jamie Hsueh	4:29
4.	"Missing You"	Francis Lee	Lin Song-chin	Jamie Hsueh	3:55
5.	"The Starter"	Jolin Tsai	Jamie Hsueh	Jamie Hsueh	4:36
6.	"The Smell of Lemon Grass"	Francis Lee	Peter Lee	Peter Lee	4:32
7.	"Be You for a Day"	Francis Lee	Jamie Hsueh	Jamie Hsueh	4:43
8.	"Slave Ship"	Issac Chen	Jamie Hsueh	Jamie Hsueh	4:56
9.	"Disappearing Castle"	Kevin Yi	Alex Chang Jien	Peter Lee	4:10
10.	"Fake Confess"	Francis Lee	Paul Lee	Peter Lee	4:10
11.	"Rope on Vest"	Jolin Tsai	Clayton Cheung	Jamie Hsueh	4:05
12.	"My Choice"	Francis Lee; Al Kuan	Tan Boon Wah	Jamie Hsueh	4:31
13.	"Darkness"	Andrew Ling	Peter Kam	Jamie Hsueh	4:41
14.	"Sweetie"	Andrew Ling	Peter Kam	Jamie Hsueh	3:35
15.	"Rewind"	Vincent Fang	Jay Chou	G-Power	4:25
Total length:					65:50

Final Wonderland – DVD
No.	Title	Length
1.	"The Spirit of Knight" (music video)	4:19
2.	"Magic" (music video)	3:45
3.	"Fake Confess" (music video)	4:07
4.	"Prague Square" (music video)	4:53
5.	"Say Love You" (music video)	3:49
6.	"Be You for a Day" (music video)	4:36
7.	"Rope on Vest" (music video)	4:01
8.	"Pirates" (music video)	4:37
9.	"36 Tricks of Love" (music video)	3:37
10.	"It's Love" (music video)	4:18
11.	"The Smell of Lemon Grass" (music video)	4:28
12.	"The Starter" (music video)	4:37
13.	"Love Love Love" (music video)	3:48
14.	"Signature Gesture" (music video)	3:13
15.	"Sky" (music video)	5:47
16.	"J-Game" (music video)	4:04
17.	"Greek Girl by the Wishing Pond" (music video)	3:24
18.	"Overlooking Purposely" (music video)	3:04
19.	"Missing You" (music video)	3:58
20.	"Exclusive Myth" (music video)	4:11
21.	"Repeated Note" (music video)	4:27
22.	"Paradise" (music video)	3:16
Total length:		90:19

== Release history ==
Region	Date	Format(s)	Distributor
Various	September 19, 2007	Streaming	Sony BMG
Malaysia	September 19, 2007	3CD+DVD	Sony BMG
Taiwan	September 19, 2007	3CD+DVD	Sony BMG
