= J-Top =

2006 greatest hits album by Jolin Tsai

- Standard edition cover

Greatest hits album by Jolin Tsai
- Released: May 5, 2006
- Genre: Pop
- Length: 2:59:57
- Label: Sony BMG
- Producer: Bing Wang; Jamie Hsueh; Peter Lee; Jay Chou; Jack Chou; Adia; Huang Yi; G-Power

Jolin Tsai chronology
J1 Live Concert (2005)	J-Top (2006)	Dancing Diva (2006)

Singles from J-Top
- 1. "My Choice" Released: April 26, 2006

J-Top is a greatest hits album by Taiwanese singer Jolin Tsai, released by Sony BMG on May 5, 2006. The album features 20 tracks from her time with Sony, along with four music videos, a documentary, a remix medley, and two previously unreleased songs. It sold over 100,000 copies in Taiwan and ranked as the fifth best-selling album of the year in 2006.

== Background ==
On April 11, 2006, media reports revealed that Sony BMG planned to release a greatest hits compilation for Tsai in early May of that year. On April 20, 2006, it was further reported that the album would be officially released on May 5. Pre-orders for the album began on April 21, 2006.

On April 11, 2006, media reports revealed that Sony BMG would release a greatest hits compilation for Tsai in early May of that year. On April 20, the label officially announced the release of J-Top on May 5, 2006. Preorders for the album began on April 21. The album, which was released on May 5, included 20 tracks from Tsai's albums under Sony, four music videos, a documentary, a remix medley, and two previously unreleased songs: "My Choice" and "Clothing Astrology".

== Writing ==
The songs "My Choice" and "Clothing Astrology" were originally recorded by Tsai during her time with Sony but were excluded from previous albums to maintain a balanced musical style. "My Choice" is a delicate ballad that opens with piano and features sweeping strings in the chorus to heighten its emotional depth, portraying the helplessness and reluctance following the end of a relationship.

"Clothing Astrology" is a mid-tempo dance track with a strong, distinct rhythm infused with hip-hop influences, showcasing Tsai's sultry side. For this compilation, Sony BMG also produced a remix medley, blending six songs—"Signature Gesture", "Magic", "Say Love You", "Overlooking Purposely", "Prague Square", and "Rewind"—into an electronic dance version.

== Music Videos ==
On April 26, 2006, Sony BMG released the music video for the song "My Choice", directed by Chin Cho. The video featured Ring Chiu, a member of the group MYRS who bears a striking resemblance to Tsai, in the lead role. The audience response was mixed. On May 27, 2006, Sony BMG released the music video for "Clothing Astrology", directed by Bill Chia. The video showcased six doll-like costumes recreating Tsai's fashion styles from the era of Magic (2003) through J-Game (2005). Sony BMG described the work as a "graduation gift" to Tsai, expressing their best wishes.

== Commercial performance ==
In its first week of release, the album debuted at number one on the weekly sales charts of both G-Music and Five Music in Taiwan. By December 12, 2006, media reports confirmed that the album had sold over 100,000 copies in Taiwan and ranked as the fifth best-selling album of 2006 in the region. Additionally, it placed number 14 on Five Music's annual sales chart for that year.

== Critical reception ==
Shu Wa of Tencent Entertainment noted that this greatest hits compilation was released just one week before Tsai's first album with EMI, Dancing Diva (2006), putting her in a position of competing with her own work in the market. The album features 20 hit singles from her Sony era, alongside two new songs and video content from the J1 World Tour. It was Tsai's first greatest hits album to offer a pre-order option and remains her best-selling compilation from the Sony period.

Stephen Lee of Sina Music commented that the album effectively consolidates Tsai's representative works during her Sony BMG years, including popular tracks like "Say Love You", "Magic", "Sky", "Overlooking Purposely", "Pirates", and "J-Game", all of which enjoyed popularity across the Greater China region. He regarded the compilation as an important retrospective of her musical style at that time. Regarding the new tracks, he felt "My Choice" was a lyrical ballad but lacked distinctiveness, while "Clothing Astrology" was overall unremarkable. In contrast, the older songs held greater appeal.

== Track listing ==
J-Top – CD 1
No.	Title	Lyrics	Music	Producer(s)	Length
1.	"My Choice" (我要的選擇)	Francis Lee; Al Kuan	Tan Boon Wah	Jamie Hsueh	4:31
2.	"Magic" (看我72變)	Issac Chen	Edward Chan; Charles Lee	Bing Wang	3:46
3.	"Say Love You" (說愛你)	Simon Liang	Jay Chou	Bing Wang	3:46
4.	"Fake Confess" (假面的告白)	Francis Lee	Paul Lee	Peter Lee	4:10
5.	"36 Tricks of Love" (愛情三十六計)	Kiki Hu	Savan Kotecha; Andrew Frampton; Wayne Wilkins	Bing Wang	3:34
6.	"It's Love" (就是愛)	Simon Liang	Jay Chou	Bing Wang	4:16
7.	"The Smell of Lemon Grass" (檸檬草的味道)	Francis Lee	Peter Lee	Peter Lee	4:32
8.	"Pirates" (海盜)	Issac Chen	Jay Chou	Jay Chou	4:35
9.	"Exclusive Myth" (獨佔神話)	Issac Chen	Wang Leehom	Jack Chou	4:10
10.	"Disappearing Castle" (消失的城堡)	Kevin Yi	Alex Chang Jien	Peter Lee	4:10
11.	"Smell of the Popcorn" (爆米花的味道)	Vincent Fang	Wan Chiu	Bing Wang	4:20
Total length:					45:50

J-Top – CD 2
No.	Title	Lyrics	Music	Producer(s)	Length
1.	"Clothing Astrology" (衣服占心術)	Francis Lee	Jonas Nordelius; Andreas Levander; Marcus Dernulf	Bing Wang	3:41
2.	"J-Game" (野蠻遊戲)	Issac Chen	Jonas Nordelius; Andreas Levander; Awa Manneh	Bing Wang	3:51
3.	"Greek Girl by the Wishing Pond" (許願池的希臘少女)	Alang Huang	Ivana Wong	Jamie Hsueh	3:10
4.	"Sky" (天空)	Wesley Chia; Kiki Hu	Wesley Chia	Adia	4:38
5.	"Signature Gesture" (招牌動作)	Issac Chen	Edward Chan; Charles Lee	Jamie Hsueh	3:12
6.	"Love Love Love"	Simon Liang	Konstantin Meladze	Huang Yi	3:48
7.	"Repeated Note" (反覆記號)	Jolin Tsai	Jamie Hsueh	Jamie Hsueh	4:24
8.	"Overlooking Purposely" (睜一隻眼閉一隻眼)	Sunny Lee; Francis Lee	Mads Hauge; Vincent DeGiorgio	Jamie Hsueh	2:59
9.	"Prague Square" (布拉格廣場)	Vincent Fang	Jay Chou	Jay Chou	4:54
10.	"Rewind" (倒帶)	Vincent Fang	Jay Chou	G-Power	4:25
11.	"The Spirit of Knight" (騎士精神)	Jolin Tsai	Jay Chou	Jay Chou	4:17
12.	"J-Top Hits" (Signature Gesture / Magic / Say Love You / Overlooking Purposely / Prague Square / Rewind)	Issac Chen; Simon Liang; Sunny Lee; Francis Lee; Vincent Fang	Edward Chan; Charles Lee; Jay Chou; Mads Hauge; Vincent DeGiorgio		6:03
Total length:					49:22

J-Top – DVD
No.	Title	Length
1.	"My Choice" (music video)	4:40
2.	"Signature Gesture" (music video)	3:13
3.	"Single Harm" (music video)	3:44
4.	"Paradise" (music video)	3:16
5.	"2002–2005 J-Top Documentary"	69:52
Total length:		84:45

== Release history ==
Region	Date	Format(s)	Edition	Distributor
Various	May 5, 2006	Streaming	Standard	Sony BMG
Hong Kong	May 5, 2006	2CD+DVD	Standard	Sony BMG
Malaysia	May 5, 2006	2CD+DVD	Standard	Sony BMG
Singapore	May 5, 2006	2CD+DVD	Standard	Sony BMG
Taiwan	May 5, 2006	2CD+DVD	Standard	Sony BMG
China	July 3, 2006	2CD	Standard	GSM
China	July 3, 2006	2 cassette	Standard	GSM
China	July 3, 2006	DVD	Standard	GSM
China	July 3, 2006	2VCD	Standard	GSM
China	October 30, 2006	2CD+DVD	Limited	GSM
