= My Choice (song) =

Single by Jolin Tsai

from the album J-Top
- Language: Mandarin
- Released: April 26, 2006
- Genre: Pop
- Length: 4:31
- Label: Sony BMG
- Composer: Tan Boon Wah
- Lyricists: Francis Lee; Al Kuan
- Producer: Jamie Hsueh

Jolin Tsai singles chronology
"Destined Guy" (2005)	"My Choice" (2006)	"Dancing Diva" (2006)

Music video
- "My Choice" on YouTube

"My Choice" (Chinese: 我要的選擇; pinyin: Wǒ yào de xuǎnzé) is a song by Taiwanese singer Jolin Tsai, featured on her greatest hits album J-Top (2006). Written by Francis Lee, Al Kuan, and Tan Boon Wah, and produced by Jamie Hsueh, it was released as the album's lead single on April 26, 2006, by Sony BMG.

== Background ==
On February 16, 2006, Tsai signed a new recording contract with EMI. Shortly after, on April 21, 2006, Sony BMG began accepting pre-orders for her compilation album J-Top, which included "My Choice" as its lead track.

== Composition and recording ==
"My Choice" opens with a soft piano introduction that transitions into a sweeping string arrangement during the chorus, underscoring Tsai's emotional vocal performance. The song begins with an almost a cappella section, allowing Tsai's delicate yet powerful tone to take center stage. Lyrically, the song explores themes of heartbreak and separation, with the central message that the end of a relationship is "not my choice".

== Music video ==
The music video for "My Choice", directed by Chin Cho, was released on April 26, 2006.

== Release history ==
Release dates and formats for "My Choice"
Region	Date	Format(s)	Distributor
China	April 26, 2006	Radio airpaly	Sony BMG
