= J-Game =

2005 studio album by Jolin Tsai

- Standard edition cover

Studio album by Jolin Tsai
- Released: April 25, 2005
- Genre: Pop
- Length: 38:48
- Label: Sony BMG
- Producer: Jamie Hsueh; Jack Chou; Bing Wang; Adia

Jolin Tsai chronology
| Born to Be a Star (2004) | J-Game (2005) | J1 Live Concert (2005) |

Singles from J-Game
- 1. "J-Game" Released: April 13, 2005

J-Game is the seventh studio album by Taiwanese singer Jolin Tsai, released on April 25, 2005, by Sony BMG. Produced by Jamie Hsueh, Jack Chou, Bing Wang, and Adia, the album blends a rich variety of musical styles, including pop, hip-hop, electronic, old-school, disco, and Chinese traditional elements.

The album sold over 260,000 copies in Taiwan and surpassed 1.2 million copies across Asia. It ranked as the second best-selling album of the year in Taiwan and was the top-selling album by a female artist in 2005.

== Background and development ==
On January 11, 2005, media reports revealed that Tsai planned to release a new album between March and April of the same year. By January 24, 2005, it was reported that she had begun recording and aimed to complete three songs before the 2005 Lunar New Year, with the album continuing her signature upbeat dance style. On January 25, 2005, reports indicated that Tsai would be involved in songwriting for the new album. She stated that upbeat tracks are her strength and would remain a key feature, revealing she had written lyrics exploring themes of love and philosophy, though their inclusion was not yet confirmed. She also mentioned that the record label had invited Jay Chou to compose songs but had not yet received the finished work.

On February 26, 2005, media disclosed that Jay Chou had completed an upbeat track and submitted it for evaluation by the record label. By March 17, 2005, Tsai had nearly finished recording ten songs. The next day, Sony's executive Liu Tian-chien stated that while Jay Chou's song rights had been secured and multiple lyricists were working on the lyrics, its inclusion in the album was still undecided. Tsai expressed her respect for the company's final decision.

On March 30, 2005, reports suggested the new album would be released by the end of April, with the lead single titled "J-Game", co-written by Issac Chen. The second song was said to be a ballad. On April 8, 2005, media revealed that Wang Leehom had also contributed a Chinese-style R&B track to the album, which Tsai said she loved. The album was produced by Jamie Hsueh, Bing Wang, and others. Tsai mentioned that over a hundred songs had been considered, with only the most fitting selected for the final tracklist.

== Writing and recording ==
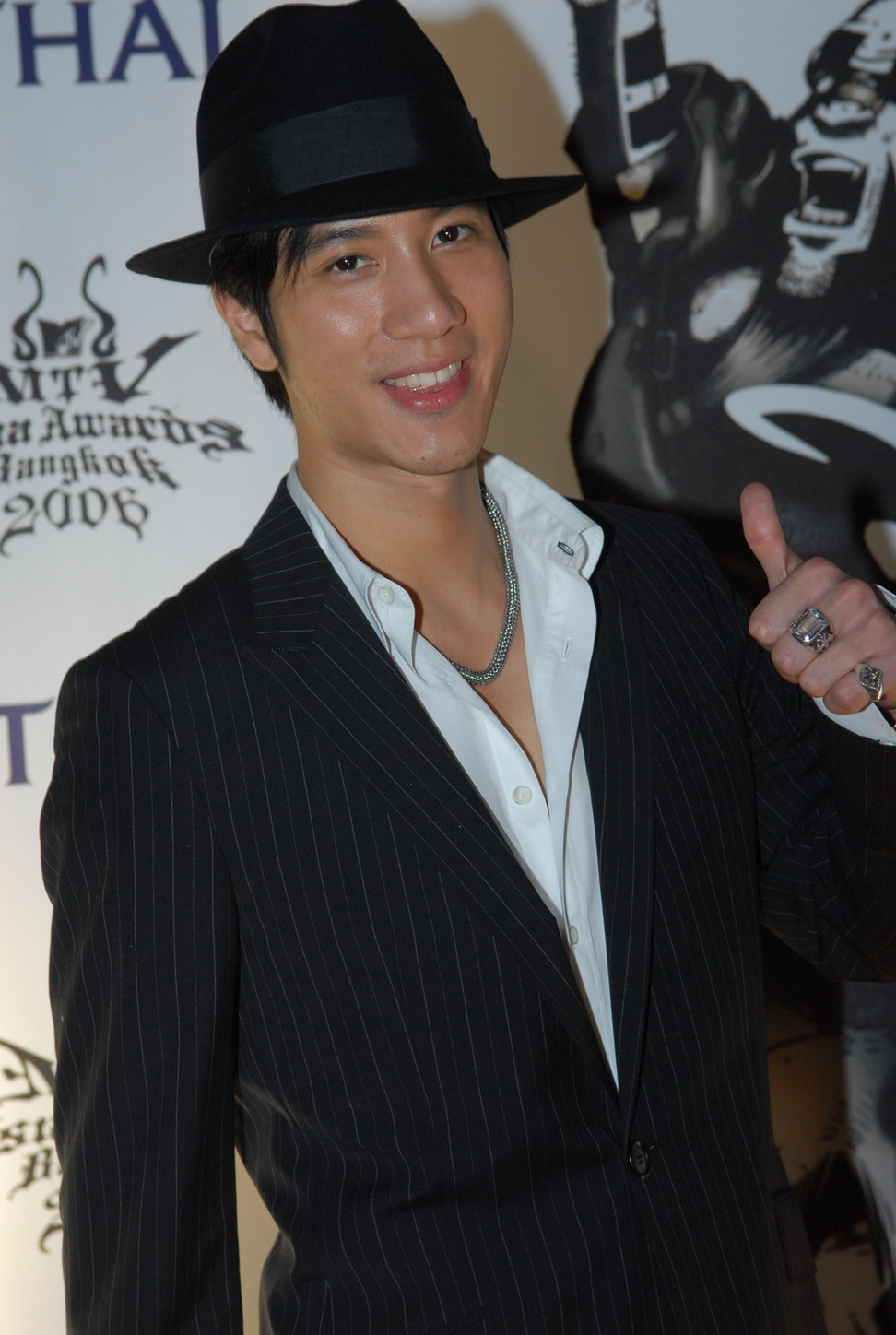
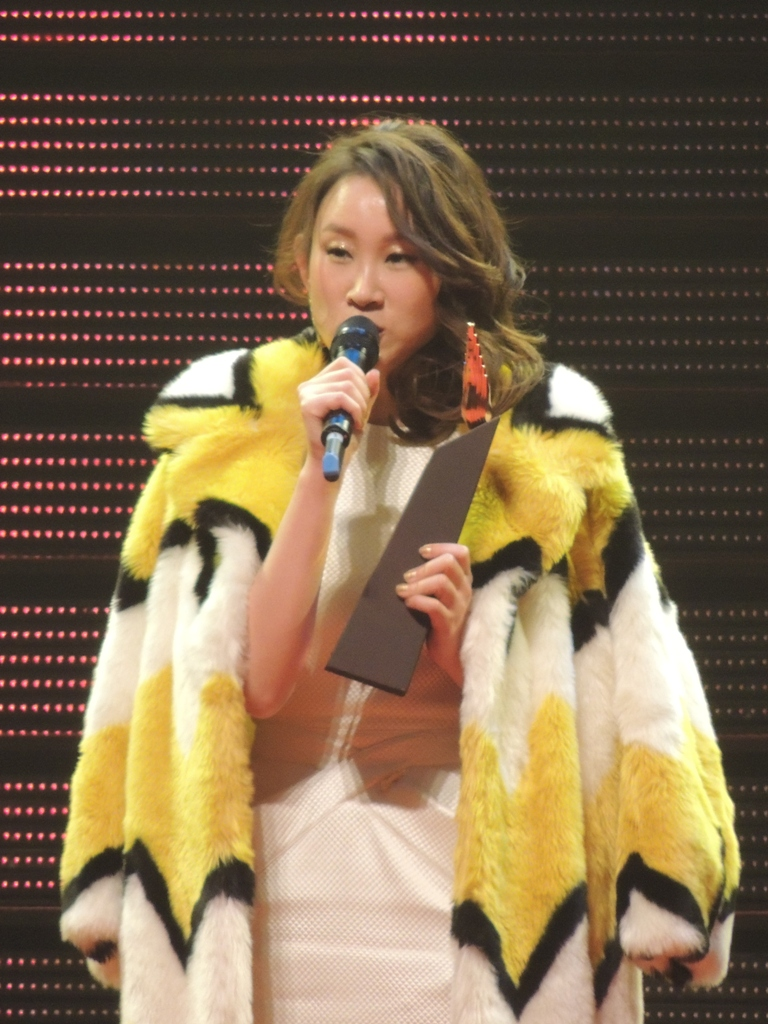
Wang Leehom (left) and Ivana Wong (right), two collaborators on the album

The lead single, "J-Game", blends hip-hop, rap, old-school, and disco elements. It opens with playful spoken lines, paired with a rhythmic intro and electronic effects throughout, creating a joyful atmosphere. The lyrics draw creative inspiration from the 1995 film Jumanji, extensively using animal names to symbolize the many roles people play in life. To capture the song's style, Tsai experimented with multiple vocal ranges before recording to find the most fitting delivery.

"Sky" unfolds gradually with piano melodies, complemented by Tsai's deep and emotionally rich voice. "Overlooking Purposely" features an upbeat tempo and describes ways of handling romantic relationships. "Greek Girl by the Wishing Pond" showcases an exotic style, combining turntable effects and harmonies to evoke a Mediterranean vibe. "Exclusive Myth" fuses traditional Chinese melodies with modern rhythms to portray themes of new-age love.

"Repeated Note", penned by Tsai herself, uses musical notation as a metaphor for an indefinable kind of love. "Missing You" expresses romantic feelings through smooth melodies. "Sweet and Sour" is built on crisp guitar sounds, conveying the complex emotions within love. "Oh Oh" depicts playful interactions between girls with a lively musical style. Finally, "Hunting Cupid" combines rock rhythms and strong beats, expressing a proactive attitude toward love.

== Title and artwork ==
The album centers around the theme of "Game" and conveys a message of perseverance through life's journey, friendships, love, and everyday experiences. This message is expressed through three visually and musically integrated concepts: "Jisco-Game", "Jissing-Game", and "Jancy-Game", each representing a distinct emotional spectrum—adventure, joy, sorrow, and growth. These three concepts correspond to the album's diverse musical styles. "Jisco-Game" features fast-paced dance tracks infused with hip-hop, electronic, old-school, and disco elements. "Jissing-Game" focuses on ballads that explore themes of longing and emotional growth in love. "Jancy-Game" blends whimsical fantasy with upbeat rhythms, showcasing a departure from conventional musical norms.

The album's visual styling was crafted by Chen Sun-hua, signaling a shift toward a more mature image. The overall styling budget totaled NT$500,000, with some materials specially sourced from Japan. On the cover of the pre-order edition, Tsai is seen wearing a royal blue, low-cut gown custom-made by Chen, featuring a skirt designed with patchwork cuts. The standard edition presents a more casual look, with a T-shirt and jeans on the front cover, while the back cover features a pink balloon skirt designed by Rei Kawakubo, paired with handcrafted jewelry and earrings to create a visually layered effect.

For the deluxe edition, Tsai appears in a punk-inspired outfit she styled herself. The look includes a retro bleached calfskin jacket, a mini skirt, and gold accessories. Tsai explained that ornate accessories were used to soften the masculine edge of punk fashion and infuse it with femininity, while gold was the trend color of that summer.

== Release and promotion ==
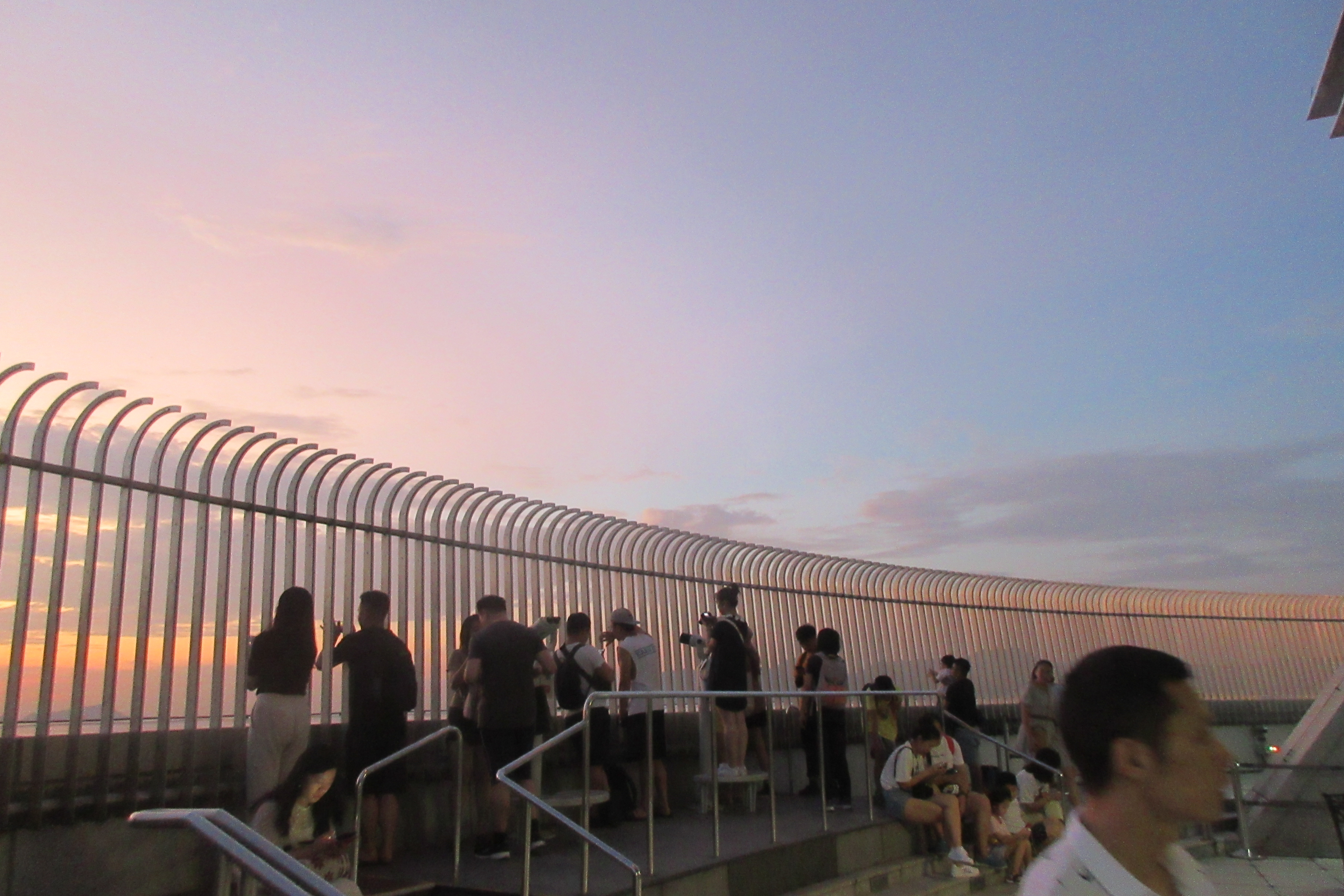
The rooftop observatory deck of Taipei 101 served as the venue for the album's celebration event.

On April 11, 2005, Sony BMG announced that the album would be available for pre-order starting April 15. Pre-order bonuses included behind-the-scenes footage from the music video of the song "J-Game". On April 16, 2005, Tsai held an album premiere at the Red House Theater Square in Taipei. The album was officially released on April 25, 2005.

On June 1, 2005, Tsai held a celebration event for the album at the rooftop observatory deck of Taipei 101. On June 18, 2005, she hosted the Exclusive Asia Concert in Taichung, drawing a crowd of over 20,000 attendees. On July 8, 2005, she released the deluxe edition of the album, which included ten additional music videos.

On December 20, 2005, media reports revealed that Tsai's contract with Sony BMG had actually expired as early as February that year. Despite being without a contract, she continued to actively support the label's promotional efforts.

=== Single and music videos ===
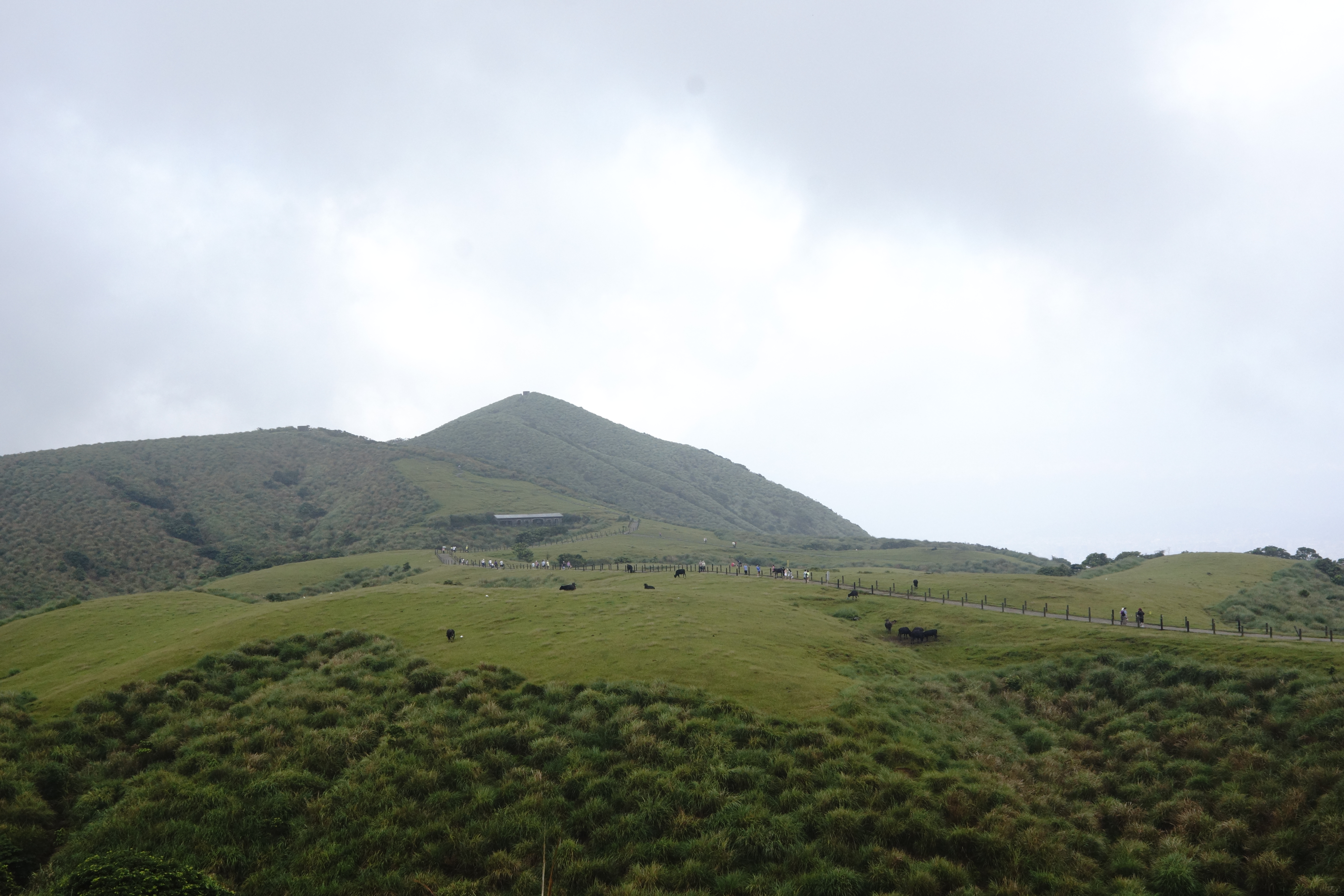
Qingtiangang Grassland in Yangmingshan National Park served as one of the filming locations for the music video of the track "Sky".

On April 13, 2005, Tsai released the single "J-Game". The music video was co-directed by Marlboro Lai and Bill Chia, with a production budget of approximately NT$1.5 million. The video features vibrant animation that blends a fantastical game world with reality, interspersed with scenes of Tsai dancing by the water's edge. The directors designed surreal, hyperrealistic floral settings and used a helicopter as a guiding motif to symbolize the passage between illusion and reality. The video ends with Tsai piloting the helicopter, symbolizing fearless determination. This helicopter, costing around NT$30 million, was designed by a Ferrari designer.

The music video for the song "Sky" was directed by JP Huang and filmed at Qingtiangang Grassland in Yangmingshan National Park. The music video for "Exclusive Myth" was directed by Kuang Sheng, with a production cost of about NT$1.5 million. The set featured alleys and archways with Oriental aesthetics, complemented by ink wash landscape animations created by a film art team. Composer Wang Leehom served as the creative consultant, contributing ideas such as Chinese-style settings, slow-motion camera work, traditional instruments like the erhu and guzheng, and smoke effects. The video's narrative portrays Tsai communicating with a past life through a spirit board, playing both an angel and a demon, symbolizing the contrast between past and present lives.

The music video for "Overlooking Purposely" was directed by Kuang Sheng. The music video for "Greek Girl by the Wishing Pond" was co-directed by Marlboro Lai and Bill Chia. The music video for "Repeated Note", directed by Marlboro Lai, features Tsai holding a cat symbolizing betrayal, appearing with light makeup and clutching a diary; the visuals show her using correction fluid to erase past sweet memories. The music video for "Sweet and Sour" was also directed by Marlboro Lai.

=== Live performances ===
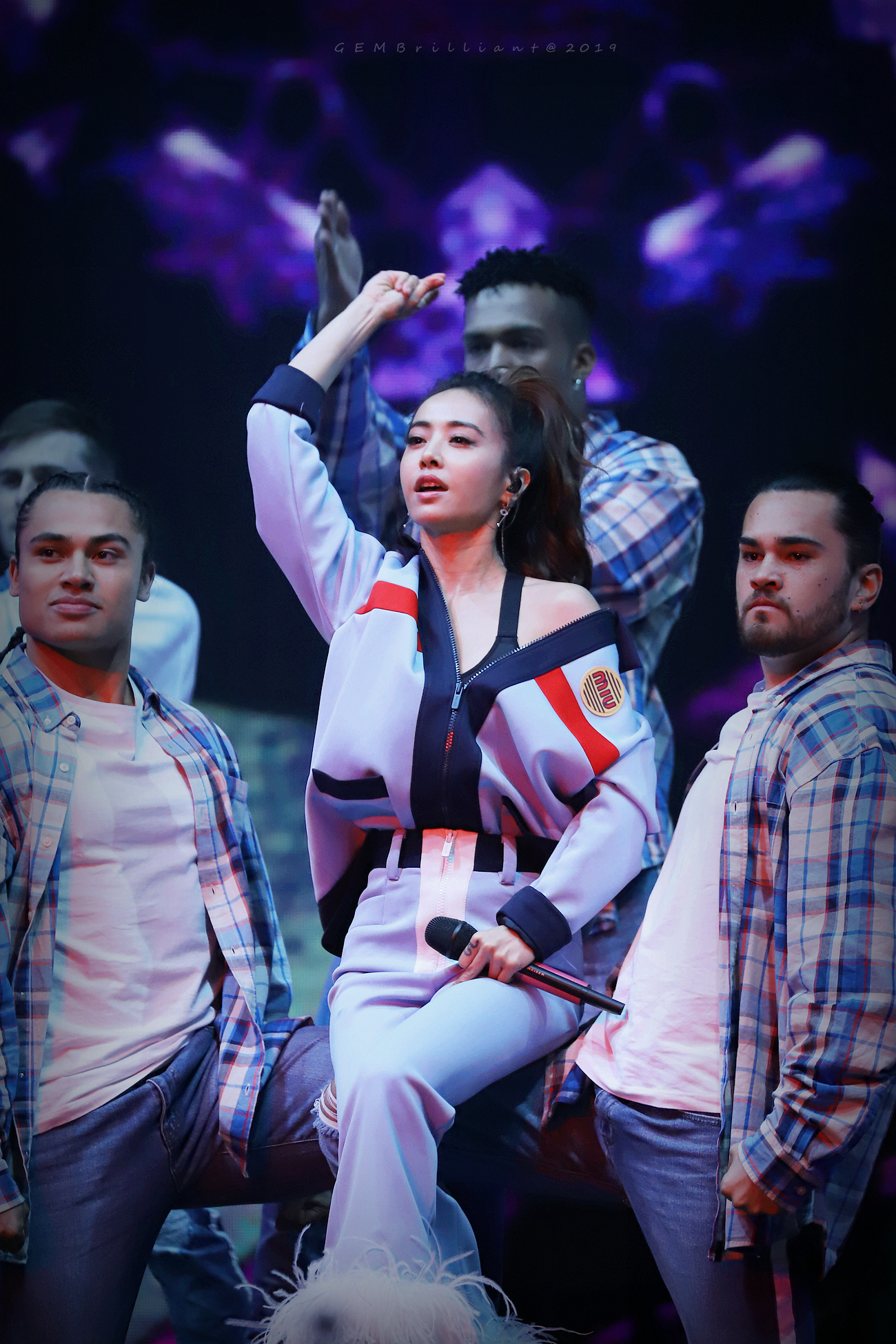
Tsai performed "J-Game" at the 12th Migu Music Awards, December 2018

On July 24, 2005, Tsai attended the 7th CCTV-MTV Music Awards, where she performed "J-Game". On August 5, 2005, she participated in the 2005 Metro Radio Mandarin Hits Music Awards, performing "Sky" and "J-Game". On August 20, 2005, Tsai appeared at the 2005 Taipei Pop Music Festival, where she performed "Overlooking Purposely" and "J-Game". On September 3, 2005, she performed "J-Game" at the 5th Global Chinese Music Awards.

On October 19, 2005, Tsai performed "J-Game" at the opening ceremony of the 7th Nanning International Folk Song Arts Festival. On October 25, 2005, she attended the China Online Music Festival Concert, where she also performed "J-Game". On December 31, 2005, Tsai performed "J-Game", "Sky", and "Overlooking Purposely" at the New Year's Eve Concert in Kaohsiung.

On January 11, 2006, she performed "J-Game" at the 12th China Music Awards. On January 21, 2006, she performed "Sky" and "J-Game" at the 2006 Hito Music Awards. On February 26, 2006, Tsai performed "Greek Girl by the Wishing Pond" and "Sky" at the 2006 TVBS Music Awards. Subsequently, Tsai continued to attend various events held around the world, where she performed songs from the album.

== Commercial performance ==
On April 16, 2005, Sony BMG announced that the album had surpassed 15,000 pre-orders in Taiwan on its first day of availability. By April 25, 2005, media reported that over 150,000 copies had been pre-ordered in Taiwan within just ten days. In its first week of release, the album debuted at number one on the weekly sales charts of Taiwan's G-Music, Asia Music, and Five Music. On May 27, 2005, G-Music announced that the album had remained at the top of its weekly chart for five consecutive weeks. On June 1, 2005, Sony BMG revealed that the album had sold over one million copies across Asia. By August 1, 2005, media reports confirmed that total sales in Asia had surpassed 1.2 million copies. On December 5, 2005, it was reported that the album had sold more than 220,000 copies in Taiwan alone.

On December 17, 2005, the media revealed that the album was the second best-selling record of the year in Taiwan, and the best-selling album by a female artist. It also ranked number 2 and number 4 on the 2005 annual sales charts of G-Music and Five Music, respectively. Final reports stated that the album sold over 260,000 copies in Taiwan and more than 1.2 million copies throughout Asia in 2005.

Additionally, the song "J-Game" ranked number 26 on Taiwan's Hit FM Top 100 Singles of 2005. "Sky" and "Overlooking Purposely" placed at number 2 and number 65, respectively.

== Critical reception ==
The Chinese Musicians Exchange Association praised the album for following current trends to an exceptional degree, calling it a pinnacle of bubblegum pop evolution. They commended its production quality, noting it was full of surprises and worthy of repeated listening, though they suggested more attention be given to tailoring the music to Tsai's vocal range. Music critic Yang Liting highlighted the involvement of Wang Leehom as a collaborator, praising the album's bold experimentation with musical styles and its further reinforcement of Tsai's status as the queen of dance-pop. Liang Yucong of Guangzhou Broadcasting Network described the album as more international and stylistically diverse than her previous works, with a more mature and feminine tone. He credited Wang Leehom's participation with introducing fresh hip-hop elements and noted improvements in Tsai's vocal performance. Wang Biaomin of Ai FM pointed out that Tsai once again led with dance music and successfully showcased her unique artistic identity.

Xi Fei of Wow! FM offered a more reserved assessment, stating that while the album's overall listenability was slightly weaker than her previous release, the songs grew on the listener with time but lacked instant impact. Nevertheless, he affirmed that Tsai's consistent personal growth with each album was a key reason for her lasting popularity. Shu Wa of Tencent Entertainment observed that the album's production continued the style of her previous two works, with uptempo tracks leaning toward electronic sounds. The addition of new local producers, with Jamie Hsueh leading and Wang Leehom making his first collaborative appearance, was noted. However, compared to her previous collaborations with Jay Chou, the response was more subdued, and despite producer Adia's debut involvement, the track "Sky" failed to generate the expected chemistry.

NetEase Entertainment considered the album finely crafted but somewhat lackluster, describing it as technically polished yet lacking a standout moment. Zhou Bing of Music FM Radio Guangdong regarded the album as solid but unremarkable, noting that although Jay Chou was no longer involved, the quality remained stable and the style consistent. It was well received among younger fans, though the weaker melodic hooks could pose challenges for its longevity. He Yajia of New Express felt that the album's attempt to blend hip-hop, electronica, old-school, and disco into a distinctive "Jisco" style resulted in a lack of cohesion. The effort to innovate fell short, leading to a scattered feel and the absence of a clear identity or direction. Although the producers each showcased their individual strengths, the end result left Tsai's artistic position feeling undefined.

== Accolades ==
On July 24, 2005, Tsai won the Best Female Taiwan Singer award at the 7th CCTV-MTV Music Awards, thanks to this album. On August 5, 2005, she received the Best Asian Singer and the Best Stage Performance awards at the 2005 Metro Radio Mandarin Hits Music Awards. The song "J-Game" won the Song of the Year and the Top Songs awards, while "Sky" received the Top Songs award. On September 3, 2005, Tsai was awarded the Most Popular Female Singer and Best Stage Performance awards at the 5th Global Chinese Music Awards. On October 30, 2005, "J-Game" won the Top 10 Taiwan Songs at the 3rd Southeast Music Chart Awards.

On November 5, 2005, Tsai won the 2005 Singapore Hit Award for Best Chart Performance. On December 15, 2005, she received the Best Female Singer award in the Import Category at the 5th China Golden Record Awards. On January 11, 2006, Tsai won the Most Popular Hong Kong/Taiwan Female Singer award at the 12th China Music Awards, and "Sky" won Song of the Year. On January 21, 2006, Tsai won the Best Female Singer award and the Most Charting Singles Artist award at the 2006 Hito Music Awards. The album was recognized for the longest consecutive number one album, and "Sky" won the Top 10 Mandarin Songs of the Year. On January 23, 2006, she was awarded the Bronze Prize for Most Popular Female Artist at the 28th Top Ten Chinese Gold Songs Awards.

On February 17, 2006, she won the Best Female Singer of the Year award at the 1st KKBox Music Awards, and the album won the Top 10 Albums of the Year. The song "Overlooking Purposely" won the Top 10 Singles, while "Sky" won the Top 10 Karaoke Songs of the Year. On February 26, 2006, Tsai received the Best Female Singer award at the 2006 TVBS Music Awards, and the album won the Top 10 Albums. On March 1, 2006, she was nominated for the Favorite Artist Taiwan award at the MTV Asia Awards 2006. On April 24, 2006, Tsai won several accolades at the 2005 Music Radio China Top Chart Awards, including Best Female Artist, Best Stage Performance, and Most Loved Artist by Music Radio DJs. On May 20, 2006, she won the Most Popular Taiwanese Female Artist award at the 3rd Melody King Awards, and "J-Game" won the Top 10 Mandarin Songs. Additionally, the song "Exclusive Myth" won the Top 10 Mandarin Songs at the Canadian Chinese Pop Music Awards.

== Track listing ==
J-Game – Standard / Champion Celebration edition
| No. | Title | Lyrics | Music | Producer(s) | Length |
|---|---|---|---|---|---|
| 1. | "Intro" | | | Jamie Hsueh; Jack Chou | 0:43 |
| 2. | "J-Game" (野蠻遊戲) | Issac Chen | Jonas Nordelius; Andreas Levander; Awa Manneh | Bing Wang | 3:51 |
| 3. | "Greek Girl by the Wishing Pond" (許願池的希臘少女) | Alang Huang | Ivana Wong | Jamie Hsueh | 3:10 |
| 4. | "Sky" (天空) | Wesley Chia; Kiki Hu | Wesley Chia | Adia | 4:38 |
| 5. | "Overlooking Purposely" (睜一隻眼閉一隻眼) | Sunny Lee; Francis Lee | Mads Hauge; Vincent DeGiorgio | Jamie Hsueh | 2:59 |
| 6. | "Repeated Note" (反覆記號) | Jolin Tsai | Jamie Hsueh | Jamie Hsueh | 4:24 |
| 7. | "Sweet and Sour" (酸甜) | Francis Lee | Jamie Hsueh | Jamie Hsueh | 4:29 |
| 8. | "Oh Oh" | Issac Chen | Jonas Nordelius; Andreas Levander; Jeanette Olsson | Jack Chou | 3:09 |
| 9. | "Exclusive Myth" (獨佔神話) | Issac Chen | Wang Leehom | Jack Chou | 4:10 |
| 10. | "Hunting Cupid" (追殺邱比特) | Jack Chou | Edward Chan; Charles Lee | Jamie Hsueh | 3:20 |
| 11. | "Missing You" (好想你) | Francis Lee | Lin Song-chin | Jamie Hsueh | 3:55 |
| Total length: | | | | | 38:48 |

J-Game – Champion Celebration edition (DVD)
| No. | Title | Length |
|---|---|---|
| 1. | "J-Game" (music video) | 4:04 |
| 2. | "Greek Girl by the Wishing Pond" (music video) | 3:24 |
| 3. | "Sky" (music video) | 5:47 |
| 4. | "Overlooking Purposely" (music video) | 3:04 |
| 5. | "Repeated Note" (music video) | 4:27 |
| 6. | "Sweet and Sour" (music video) | 4:30 |
| 7. | "Oh Oh" (music video) | 3:10 |
| 8. | "Hunting Cupid" (music video) | 3:22 |
| 9. | "Exclusive Myth" (music video) | 4:11 |
| 10. | "Missing You" (music video) | 3:58 |
| Total length: | | 39:57 |

== Release history ==
| Region | Date | Format(s) | Edition | Distributor |
|---|---|---|---|---|
| Various | April 25, 2005 | Streaming | Standard | Sony |
| China | April 25, 2005 | CD; cassette | Standard | Epic |
| China | April 25, 2005 | CD | Limited | Epic |
| China | July 8, 2005 | VCD | Video compilation | Epic |
| Malaysia | April 25, 2005 | CD | Standard | Sony |
| Malaysia | July 8, 2005 | VCD | Video compilation | Sony |
| Taiwan | April 25, 2005 | CD | Standard | Sony |
| Taiwan | July 8, 2005 | CD+DVD | Champion Celebration | Sony |
| Taiwan | December 15, 2017 | LP | Standard | Sony |
