= Show Your Love Concert =

2001 live video album by Jolin Tsai

Video by Jolin Tsai
- Released: May 10, 2001
- Recorded: February 25, 2001
- Venue: Panchiao Stadium (Panchiao, Taiwan)
- Genre: Pop
- Length: 1:22:41
- Label: Uniuversal; D Sound

Jolin Tsai chronology
Don't Stop Karaoke (2000)	Show Your Love Concert (2001)	Show Your Love Karaoke (2001)

Show Your Love Concert (Chinese: Show Your Love演唱會) is a live video album by Taiwanese singer Jolin Tsai, released on May 10, 2001, by Universal. The album features live performances from the Show Your Love Concert, held on February 25, 2001, at the Panchiao Stadium in Panchiao, Taiwan.

== Background and release ==
On December 22, 2000, Tsai released her third studio album, Show Your Love. On February 25, 2001, she held her first Show Your Love Concert at the Panchiao Stadium in Panchiao, attracting nearly 20,000 attendees. The second concert took place on March 4, 2001 at the planned site of Fulfillment Amphitheater in Taichung, drawing over 10,000 fans. On May 10, 2001, she released the live video album Show Your Love Concert Karaoke, featuring the performance from the Panchiao concert.

== Track listing ==
Show Your Love Concert – Disc 1
No.	Title	Lyrics	Music	Length
1.	"Show Your Love" (short version) / "Baby Face" / "Love Is Near" / "Show Your Love" (full version)"	Benny Chen; Hsieh Meng-chuan; Adam Hsu	Paul Lee; Jae Chong; Chen Wei	10:31
2.	"Gussing" / "Who Are You" / "Living with the World"	Daryl Yao; Julian Yu; Chuang Ching-wen	Ronan Keating; Stephen Gately; Shane Lynch; Keith Duffy; Martin Brannigan; Ray Hedges; Jose Manuel Lopez Moles; Ronald Ng	7:58
3.	"If You Said Love Me on That Day"	Sandee Chan	Sandee Chan	4:10
4.	"Eternity"	Chuang Ching-wen	Peter Lee	4:12
5.	"See at a Glance"	Daryl Yao	Tom Pan	4:16
6.	"Are You Happy"	Kiki Hu	Michael Tu	5:02
Total length:				36:09

Show Your Love Concert – Disc 2
No.	Title	Lyrics	Music	Length
1.	"Feel Your Presence"	Julian Yu	Chervun Liew	5:25
2.	"You Gotta Know"	Lu Hsueh-han	Chen Wei	4:54
3.	"Sugar Sugar"	Andy Kim	Jeff Barry	3:48
4.	"Fall in Love with a Street"	Hsieh Meng-chuan	Nobuhiro Makino	4:21
5.	"I Know You're Feeling Blue"	Kiki Hu	Jimmy Ye	4:07
6.	"Reluctant"	Hsieh Meng-chuan	Jimmy Ye	5:01
7.	"Pretty Pretty Day"	Mao Mao	David Wu	3:35
8.	"Everything's Gonna Be Alright"	Benny Chen	Chervun Liew	3:51
9.	"Don't Stop"	Mao Mao	Rachel Stevens; Hannah Spearritt; Bradley McIntosh; Jon Lee; Paul Cattermole; Jo O'Meara; Tina Barrett; Eliot Kennedy; Mike Percy; Tim Lever	7:42
10.	"Good-Bye"	Mao Mao; Joe Lai	Keith Chan	3:48
Total length:				46:32

== Release history ==
Region	Date	Format	Distributor
Taiwan	May 10, 2001	2VCD	Universal
