= Magic (Jolin Tsai album) =

2003 studio album by Jolin Tsai

- Standard edition cover

Studio album by Jolin Tsai
- Released: March 7, 2003
- Genre: Pop
- Length: 45:51
- Label: Sony
- Producers: Bing Wang; Peter Lee; Jamie Hsueh; Jay Chou; Huang Yi

Jolin Tsai chronology
Dance Collection (2002)	Magic (2003)	The Age of Innocence (2003)

Singles from Magic
- 1. "Magic" Released: February 19, 2003

Magic (Chinese: 看我72變; pinyin: Kàn wǒ qīshíèr biàn) is the fifth studio album by Taiwanese singer Jolin Tsai, released on March 7, 2003, by Sony. The album was produced by a team of prominent figures including Bing Wang, Peter Lee, Jamie Hsueh, Jay Chou, and Huang Yi. It blends a variety of musical styles—pop, disco, funk, folk, hip-hop, and British rock—crafted with a focus on Tsai's vocal tone, delivery, and artistic positioning. Widely regarded as a pivotal work in her career, Magic marked her transformation in sound and firmly established dance-pop as the defining direction of her musical identity.

Following its release, the album topped the G-Music sales charts in Taiwan for ten consecutive weeks, selling over 360,000 copies domestically. It achieved total sales of over 1.5 million copies across Asia. In 2003, Magic ranked as the second best-selling album of the year in Taiwan and was the highest-selling album by a female artist.

The album was nominated for Album of the Year at the 15th Golden Melody Awards. Tsai herself was nominated for Best Mandarin Female Singer, and Baby Chung received a nomination for Best Music Arrangement for his work on the track "Prague Square"—a category he ultimately won.

== Background and development ==
On December 20, 2001, media reports indicated that Tsai was in talks to sign with a new record label, with Sony emerging as the likely choice. Tsai responded, "I can swear that no contract has even been drafted yet." By January 22, 2002, reports stated that she had begun planning a new album and was soliciting song submissions.

On June 5, 2002, the media reported that Tsai's new album was scheduled for release in September and noted her intention to sign a management contract with an agency under Ke Fu-hung. On July 23, 2002, Tsai officially signed a two-year contract with Sony for three albums. By September 16, 2002, reports confirmed that she had recorded five songs for the upcoming album and was preparing to begin studio work. Further reports on December 7, 2002 indicated that the album was slated for release in January of the following year.

On February 12, 2003, Sony hosted a listening session for Tsai's new album, inviting music professionals such as Jamie Hsueh, Paula Ma, and John Yuan to discuss the album's promotion strategy. The next day, media announced the album's release date as March 7, 2003, highlighting that, unlike her previous approach of selecting songs from numerous demos, this album's tracks were custom-crafted by producers to suit Tsai's vocal qualities. The entire production process spanned several months.

== Writing and recording ==
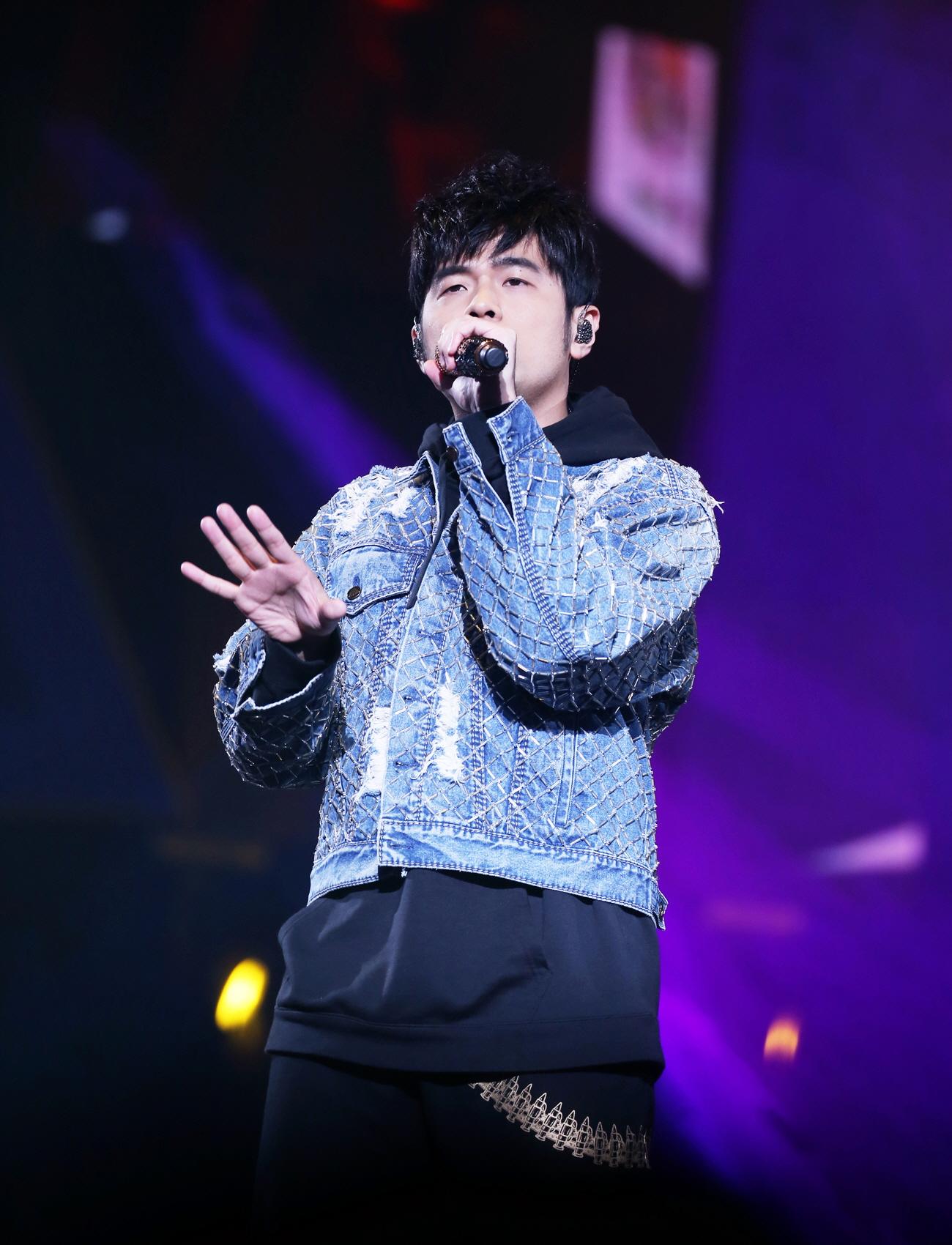
Jay Chou, one of the collaborators on the album

The lead single, "Magic", combines hip-hop and disco elements, featuring computer-simulated sanxian sounds. Its intro exudes a mysterious yet playful vibe, with an overall upbeat rhythm. Tsai spent about two weeks recording the track in the studio, singing nearly a hundred takes in total. "Fake Confess" is a lyrical ballad that opens with violin, transitioning into a string quartet and piano arrangement in the midsection, creating a dynamic melody. Tsai's vocal performance on this track has been described as sorrowful yet not bitter, successfully conveying the song's themes of emotional hurt. Media praised it as one of her most emotionally expressive performances since her debut.

"Say Love You" begins with electric guitar, accompanied by Tsai's lively vocals and rap harmonies, presenting a lighthearted and humorous pop atmosphere that strengthens the overall British rock style. "Be You for a Day" is a slow ballad led by piano, depicting a melancholic emotional state. During recording, Tsai worked closely with the producers to adjust vocal placement and emotional expression, resulting in a softer vocal tone that marked a departure from her previous style.

"Rope on Vest" features lyrics written by Tsai herself, offering a more mature and sensitive emotional perspective. The song's melody, composed by several musicians, ultimately settled on a waltz in 3/4 time by Clayton Cheung, enriched with piano, strings, and MIDI production. Its arrangement is characterized by rich chord progressions. "Prove It" is a rhythm-heavy hip-hop dance number, with Tsai delivering a strong vocal performance enhanced by vocal effects. The lyrics express a straightforward and modern view of love, reflecting the autonomous attitude of contemporary women.

== Title and artwork ==
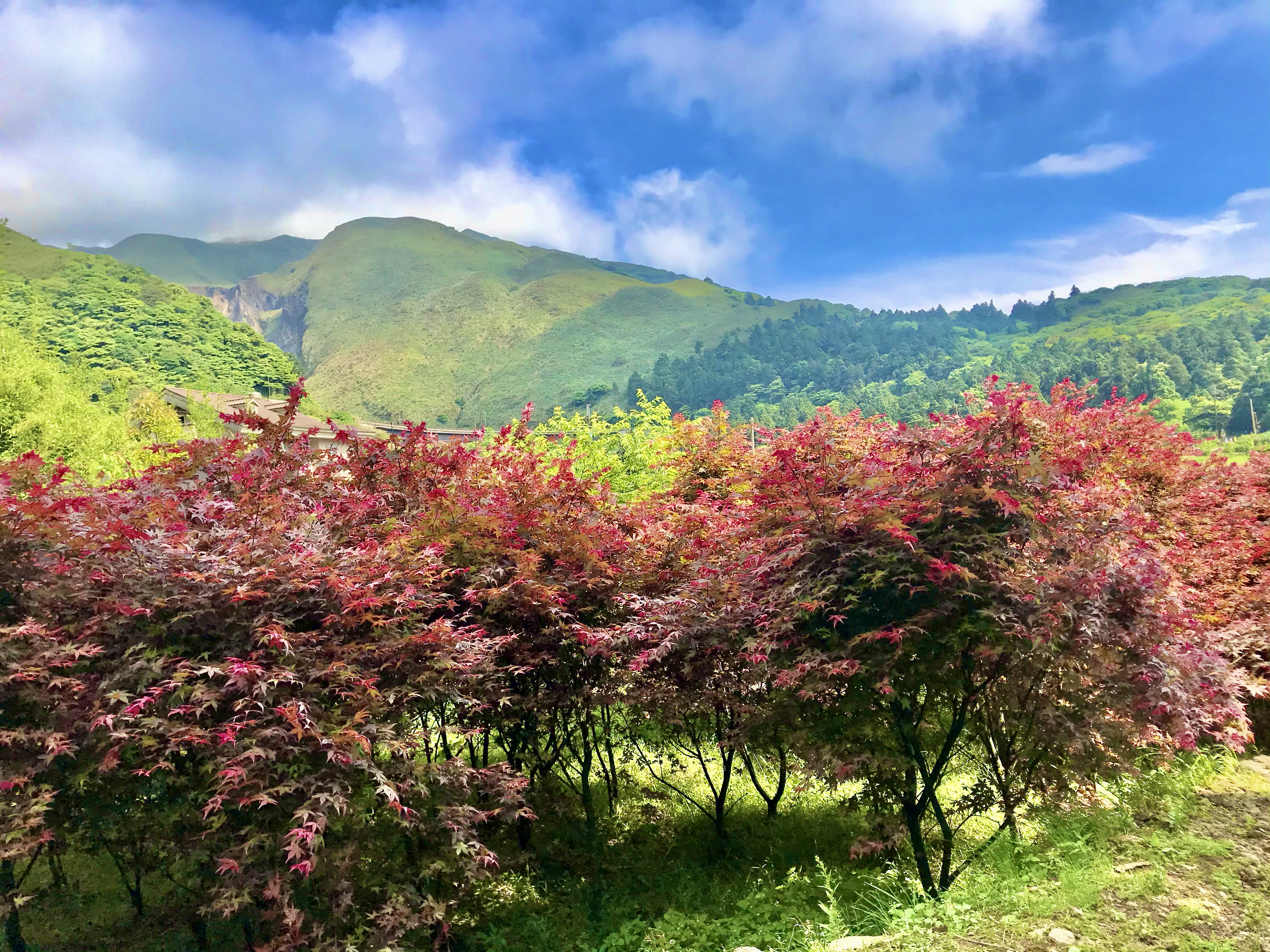
The special edition of the album featured a cover and photo booklet shot at the Bamboo Lake area of Yangmingshan National Park.

Regarding the album title's meaning, Tsai explained that this work aims to showcase her transformation in performance, encompassing adjustments in vocal style, dance choreography, and overall image. She emphasized that different songs would feature distinct vocal approaches, with sharper dance moves and more diverse, colorful wardrobe choices to highlight her evolved artistry.

To emphasize this musical and visual transformation, the official edition's cover and photo booklet adopted the theme of "Hibernation Evolution", illustrating the process through three stages: "Hibernation", "Awakening", and "Breaking the Ice". During the "Hibernation" shoot, the photographer wrapped Tsai's body in long fabric to mimic a cocoon, creating a sense of stillness. The "Awakening" phase featured white fabric cut into fringes tied around her arms, symbolizing the state of being roused by light. The "Breaking the Ice" images were captured underwater and enhanced with computer-generated droplets and glaciers, representing breakthrough and rebirth.

For styling, to present a more mature image, Tsai and stylist Chen Sun-hua traveled to Japan to select wardrobe pieces, focusing on off-shoulder and shoulder-baring dresses in primarily white and pink tones. The white outfit worn on the official cover was custom-made by designer Wang Qinghua using fabrics sourced from Japani.

The deluxe edition embraced the theme of "Spring Blossoms and Flourishing Life" for its cover and photo booklet, which were shot in the Bamboo Lake area of Yangmingshan National Park. The record label rented a flower field where Tsai donned spring-themed attire, symbolizing the album's success following its release.

== Release and promotion ==
On March 6, 2003, Sony held a press event for Tsai's new album at the New York New York Shopping Center in Taipei, revealing that the album's production cost exceeded NT$40 million. On April 12, 2003, Tsai held the Say Love You Concert in Tainan, attracting over 10,000 attendees. On May 18, 2003, she hosted the Say Love You Online Concert, which was broadcast live via Azio TV and the MyMuch website, drawing over 100,000 online viewers. On May 23, 2003, Tsai released the deluxe edition of the album, which included 11 additional music videos. On May 29, 2003, she held the Magic Concert in Las Vegas.

=== Single ===
On February 19, 2003, Tsai released the single "Magic". In the music video, she showcased four different outfits, including a floral one-piece dress, a Western cowboy ensemble, casual riding pants, and a punk-inspired outfit. To highlight the fusion of song and dance, the record label invited choreographer Rambo Lan to create a complex routine featuring intricate hand gestures that evoke the illusion of magic tricks. Since the song served as the theme for the online game Asgard, the director team used computer post-production to transform the dancers into game characters. They also designed scenes where Tsai dances alongside these animated figures. This process required frame-by-frame matching of dance movements while carefully ensuring the realism and detail of the visual effects.

=== Music videos ===
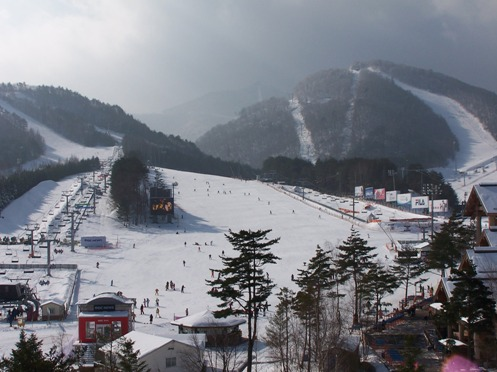
Yongpyong Ski Resort, one of the filming locations for the music video of "Fake Confess"

The music video for "Fake Confess" was directed by Tony Lin. To capture the song's melancholic atmosphere, the record label invested NT$1 million and arranged for Tsai to shoot at Yongpyong Ski Resort in South Korea, at the end of January 2003. This location is famously known as a filming site for the TV drama Winter Sonata. Originally, Korean actor Won Bin was invited to play the male lead with a proposed fee of NT$3 million for one hour, but due to scheduling conflicts with his film shoot, a Taiwanese model was ultimately cast as his replacement.

The music video for "Prague Square" was directed by Kuang Sheng and featured an exotic fantasy style. The record label spent NT$1 million to recreate a medieval European setting, meticulously designing props, sets, and costumes. The production included as many as 50 extras on set. The video for "The Spirit of Knight" was also directed by Tony Lin and filmed at Ayutthaya Historical Park and Wat Chaiwatthanaram temple in Thailand. Tsai described the MV as blending ancient Roman aesthetics with rich ethnic elements. The production invested considerable effort in camera work, location selection, choreography, and set construction. The music video for "Say Love You" was directed by Kuang Sheng and featured actor Nick Chao. Both "Be You for a Day" and "Rope on Vest" had their music videos directed by Tony Lin.

=== Live performances ===
On April 13, 2003, Tsai performed "Say Love You" and "Fake Confess" at the My Way Concert. On July 5, 2003, she appeared in the J. S. G. Selections and performed "Say Love You". On August 2, 2003, she took the stage at the 14th Golden Melody Awards ceremony, delivering a performance of "Magic".

On October 10, 2003, she participated in the Believe Taiwan Fighting Party, where she performed "The Spirit of Knight", "Magic", "Prague Square", and "Say Love You". On November 2, 2003, she appeared at the Huangpu River Source Ecological and Cultural Festival in Anji, China, performing "Magic", "Prague Square", and "Say Love You". On November 15, 2003, Tsai performed "Magic" and "Say Love You" at the Asia Super Star Anti Piracy Concert.

On November 30, 2003, she joined the Star Storm Concert, where she performed "Magic", "Said Love You", and "Fake Confess". On December 3, 2003, she sang "Say Love You" at the 2003 Metro Radio Hits Music Awards. On December 24, 2003, at the Christmas Party held by Eastern TV, Tsai performed "Magic", "Say Love You", and "Fake Confess".

== Commercial performance ==
On March 13, 2003, media reported that the album sold over 80,000 copies in Taiwan within six days of its release. It debuted at number one on the weekly sales charts of G-Music and Asia Music. By May 18, 2003, the album had topped the G-Music weekly chart for ten consecutive weeks. On June 7, 2003, the album's sales in Taiwan surpassed 300,000 copies, and by June 16, it had secured the top spot on the 2003 mid-year album sales chart in Taiwan. On August 10, 2003, Sony announced that the album had sold over 500,000 copies in mainland China, with total sales across Asia exceeding 1 million copies.

By January 7, 2004, media reported that the album was the second best-selling album of 2003 in Taiwan and the top-selling album by a female artist that year. Ultimately, the album sold over 360,000 copies in Taiwan and more than 1.5 million copies across Asia.

In terms of chart performance, the title track "Magic" ranked number one on UFO Radio's 2003 year-end top songs chart in Taiwan, while "Say Love You" ranked sixth and "Prague Square" also made the top 100. On the Hit FM Top 100 Singles chart of 2003 in Taiwan, "Say Love You" ranked number three, "Magic" placed number 24, and "Prague Square" came in at number 65.

== Critical reception ==
Tencent Entertainment commented that the album not only marked a transformation in Tsai's image, but also introduced a more diverse and pop-oriented musical style. The review emphasized that Sony's strategic repositioning of Tsai was a key factor in the album's success, noting the meticulous and refined selection of lyrics and compositions. Through collaborations with new producers such as Huang Yi, Jamie Hsueh, Bing Wang, and Jay Chou, the album achieved a fashionable and international sound—seamlessly blending trendiness and mainstream appeal across both upbeat and slower tracks.

Renowned producer Kay Huang also praised the album highly, stating that its songs helped Tsai rediscover her artistic identity. She lauded the album's well-conceived concept and regarded it as a successful example of crafting a distinct pop aesthetic within the Mandopop industry. Huang predicted the album would become one of Tsai's representative works. Apple Music described the album as a pivotal moment in Tsai's career, highlighting its break from her youthful, girlish image and the establishment of a dance-pop–driven musical direction.

Music critic Qing Yanling called the album a declaration of Tsai's transformation, noting that its lyrical content reflected her personal journey at the time and provided a blueprint for future artists–especially those pursuing a dance-pop style. Sina Entertainment observed that the album marked a shift from Tsai's previous high-pitched belting toward a deeper and more emotionally nuanced vocal delivery. However, Sohu Entertainment offered a more critical perspective, suggesting that although the involvement of producers like Jay Chou added value, the multitude of contributors ultimately led to a scattered sonic identity, preventing the album from achieving a fully cohesive musical style.

The album was selected by Tencent Music's Wave Review Panel as one of the 200 Best Mandarin Albums of 2001–2020, ranking 18th among albums released between 2001 and 2010.

== Accolades ==
On July 5, 2003, the song "Say Love You" won the Most Popular Mandarin Song award at the 2003 Q2 J. S. G. Selections. On July 28, 2003, the album was awarded Best Album of the First Half of 2003 at the Taiwan's G-Music chart, and Tsai received the Best Female Artist award for her work on the album. On August 3, 2003, Tsai won Best Female Singer at the Metro Radio Hits Music Awards, with "Say Love You" also taking home the Best Mandarin Song award. On September 6, 2003, she was honored with the Most Popular Taiwanese Artist award at the 10th Singapore Hit Awards.

On November 6, 2003, Tsai was nominated for Favorite Artist Taiwan at the MTV Asia Awards 2004. On December 28, 2003, she won Best Mandarin Female Singer at the Metro Radio Hits Music Awards, while "Say Love You" earned the Top Mandarin Songs award. On January 19, 2004, "Prague Square" was named one of the Top 10 Mandarin Songs at the Canadian Chinese Pop Music Awards. On February 21, 2004, the album won Long-lasting Album of the Year at the Hito Music Awards, and Tsai was recognized as Best Female Artist of the Year. Additionally, "Say Love You" won Longest-Charting Song of the Year and Top Mandarin Songs of the Year.

On March 30, 2004, the album was nominated for Album of the Year at the 15th Golden Melody Awards, with Tsai receiving a nomination for Best Mandarin Female Singer. Baby Chung was also nominated for Best Music Arrangement for his work on "Prague Square". On April 10, 2004, the album was awarded Top 10 Best-Selling Mandarin Albums of 2003 by the IFPI Hong Kong Top Sales Awards. On May 8, 2004, Jamie Hsueh won the Best Music Arraignment award at the 15th Golden Melody Awards for "Prague Square". On July 11, 2004, "Prague Square"was named one of the Top 10 Mandarin Songs at the 4th Chinese Music Media Awards.

== Track listing ==
Magic – Standard edition
No.	Title	Lyrics	Music	Producer(s)	Length
1.	"Say Love You" (說愛你)	Simon Liang	Jay Chou	Bing Wang	3:46
2.	"Magic" (看我72變)	Issac Chen	Edward Chan; Charles Lee	Bing Wang	3:46
3.	"Fake Confess" (假面的告白)	Francis Lee	Paul Lee	Peter Lee	4:10
4.	"Slave Ship" (奴隸船)	Issac Chen	Jamie Hsueh	Jamie Hsueh	4:56
5.	"Prague Square" (布拉格廣場)	Vincent Fang	Jay Chou	Jay Chou	4:54
6.	"Be You for a Day" (做一天的你)	Francis Lee	Jamie Hsueh	Jamie Hsueh	4:43
7.	"Prove It"	Kevin Yi	George Samuelson; Michael Lundh; Quint Starkie; Allan Rich	Huang Yi	3:39
8.	"Smell of the Popcorn" (爆米花的味道)	Vincent Fang	Wan Chiu	Bing Wang	4:20
9.	"Rope on Vest" (馬甲上的繩索)	Jolin Tsai	Clayton Cheung	Jamie Hsueh	4:05
10.	"Good Thing" (好東西)	Francis Lee	George Samuelson; Michael Lundh; Quint Starkie; Rebecca Hortlund	Huang Yi	3:15
11.	"The Spirit of Knight" (騎士精神)	Jolin Tsai	Jay Chou	Jay Chou	4:17
Total length:					45:51

Magic – Hong Kong standard edition (CD 2)
No.	Title	Lyrics	Music	Producer(s)	Length
1.	"Darkness" (我很怕黑)	Andrew Ling	Peter Kam	Jamie Hsueh	4:39
Total length:					4:39

Magic – Deluxe Celebration edition (DVD)
No.	Title	Length
1.	"Say Love You" (music video)	3:49
2.	"Magic" (music video)	3:45
3.	"Fake Confess" (music video)	4:07
4.	"Slave Ship" (music video)	4:55
5.	"Prague Square" (music video)	4:53
6.	"Be You for a Day" (music video)	4:36
7.	"Prove It" (music video)	3:36
8.	"Smell of the Popcorn" (music video)	4:19
9.	"Rope on Vest" (music video)	4:01
10.	"Good Thing" (music video)	3:11
11.	"The Spirit of Knight" (music video)	4:19
Total length:		45:31

== Charts ==
=== Weekly charts ===
Chart (2003)	Peak position
Singaporean Albums (RIAS)	1

== Release history ==
Region	Date	Format(s)	Edition(s)	Distributor
China	March 7, 2003	CD; cassette	Standard	Epic
China	June 19, 2003	VCD	Video compilation	Epic
Hong Kong	March 7, 2003	2CD	Standard	Sony
Hong Kong	May 23, 2003	CD+DVD	Deluxe Celebration	Sony
Indonesia	March 7, 2003	Cassette	Standard	Sony
Malaysia	March 7, 2003	CD; cassette	Standard	Sony
Malaysia	June 19, 2003	VCD	Video compilation	Sony
Singapore	March 7, 2003	CD	Standard	Sony
Singapore	June 19, 2003	VCD	Video compilation	Sony
Taiwan	March 7, 2003	CD	Standard	Sony
Taiwan	May 23, 2003	CD+DVD	Deluxe Celebration	Sony
