= 1019 I Can Concert =

2000 live video album by Jolin Tsai

Video by Jolin Tsai
- Released: March 16, 2000
- Recorded: December 4, 1999
- Venues: Nankang 101 (Taipei, Taiwan)
- Genre: Pop
- Length: 43:45
- Labels: Universal; D Sound

Jolin Tsai chronology
1019 I Can Concert (2000)	Don't Stop Karaoke (2000)

1019 I Can Concert (Chinese: 1019我可以演唱會) is a live video album by Taiwanese singer Jolin Tsai, released on March 16, 2000, by Universal. The album features live performances from the 1019 I Can Concert, which was held on December 4, 1999, at Nankang 101 in Taipei.

== Background and release ==
On September 10, 1999, Tsai released her debut studio album 1019. Later that year, on December 4, she held the 1019 I Can Concert at Nankang 101 in Taipei, drawing a crowd of over 5,000—a record-breaking achievement for a new artist. On March 16, 2000, she released the live video album 1019 I Can Concert, which captures the performance from that night.

== Track listing ==
No.	Title	Lyrics	Music	Length
1.	"Out on the Street" (上街)	Mao Mao	Jun Young-hun	4:39
2.	"Blame It on the Age" (怪我太年輕)	Eric Lin	Michael Tu	4:43
3.	"I Know You're Feeling Blue" (我知道你很難過)	Kiki Hu	Jimmy Ye	4:22
4.	"First Love"	Hikaru Utada	Hikaru Utada	4:18
5.	"Greatest Love of All"	Linda Creed	Michael Masser	4:48
6.	"The Rose"	Amanda McBroom	Amanda McBroom	4:20
7.	"Emptiness" (空白)	Chuang Ching-wen	Chervun Liew	3:50
8.	"Who Are You" (你是誰)	Julian Yu	Keith Chan	4:06
9.	"Living with the World" (和世界做鄰居)	Chuang Ching-wen	Ronald Ng	3:54
10.	"Good-Bye"	Mao Mao; Joe Lai	Keith Chan	4:45
Total length:				43:45

== Release history ==
Region	Date	Format	Distributor
Taiwan	March 16, 2000	VCD	Universal
