= J-Game (song) =

Single by Jolin Tsai

from the album J-Game
- Language: Mandarin
- Released: April 13, 2005
- Studio: M.E (Taiwan)
- Genre: Pop
- Length: 3:51
- Label: Sony BMG
- Composers: Jonas Nordelius; Andreas Levander; Awa Manneh
- Lyricist: Issac Chen
- Producer: Bing Wang

Jolin Tsai singles chronology
"Warriors in Peace" (2003)	"J-Game" (2005)	"Destined Guy" (2005)

Music video
- "J-Game" on YouTube

"J-Game" (Chinese: 野蠻遊戲; pinyin: Yěmán yóuxì) is a song by Taiwanese singer Jolin Tsai, featured on her seventh studio album J-Game (2005). Written by Issac Chen, Jonas Nordelius, Andreas Levander, and Awa Manneh, and produced by Bing Wang, it was released as the album's lead single on April 13, 2005, by Sony BMG.

== Background ==
On January 23, 2005, Tsai announced that her upcoming album was slated for release in April, revealing that she had already completed three songs, one of which included lyrics she had written herself. She mentioned that several other tracks were still in development, with the final tracklist expected to be confirmed before the Chinese New Year holiday. By March 31, 2005, media outlets reported that "J-Game", a composition by Issac Chen, would be selected as the lead single for the album.

== Composition ==
"J-Game" blends elements of hip-hop, old-school, and disco, creating an energetic rhythm paired with a catchy melody. The lyrics feature metaphors such as "tiger" and "mouse", symbolizing the different roles people take on in life. Tsai later reflected that the song's imagery represented life as a "savage game", where individuals must navigate challenges with courage and adaptability.

== Music video ==
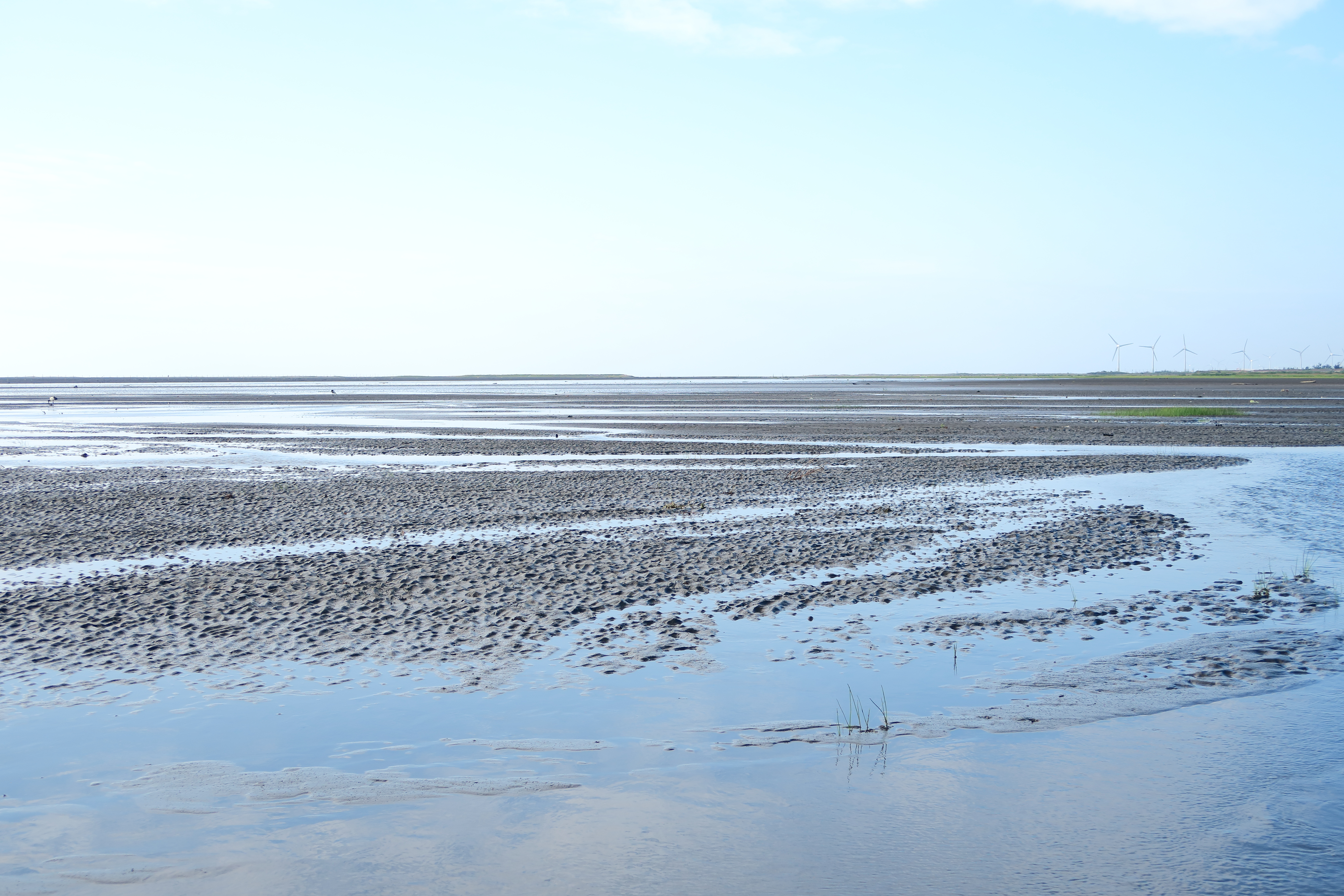
The Gaomei Wetlands served as one of the filming locations for the music video.

The music video for "J-Game" was co-directed by Marlboro Lai and Bill Chia, with a production budget of approximately NT$1.5 million. Filming took place in various locations, including the Gaomei Wetlands, and featured extensive use of computer-generated imagery, creating animated flower fields. In the video, Tsai transitions between a "real world" and a "virtual world", traveling in a futuristic helicopter designed by Ferrari's chief designer, valued at around NT$30 million.

Tsai's choreography includes rock-paper-scissors-inspired hand movements, and her fashion in the video features a pink ballet-inspired dress designed by Rei Kawakubo of Comme des Garçons. Following the video's release, some media outlets compared its animated sequences to Madonna's "Love Profusion" video, though Tsai defended the design as an original take that reflected the song's themes of life and survival.

== Commercial performance ==
"J-Game" ranked at number 26 on Taiwan's Hit FM Top 100 Singles of 2005.

== Critical reception ==
New Express described "J-Game" as an exploration of survival through the adventures of love and life, praising the integration of new dance elements and diverse musical influences. However, some critics felt that, as a lead single, it lacked the impact of Tsai's previous hits like "Magic" and "Love Love Love". The production was also described as "noisy", with some reviews noting that Tsai's enunciation was occasionally unclear, which slightly affected the overall delivery.

== Awards ==
On August 5, 2005, "J-Game" won both the Top Mandarin Song and Mandarin Song of the Year awards at the Metro Radio Mandarin Hits Music Awards. Later, on October 30, 2005, the track was named one of the Top 10 Taiwanese Songsat the 3rd Southeast Music Chart Awards. It was further recognized on May 20, 2006, when it was included among the Top 10 Mandarin Songs at the 3rd Music King Awards.

== Live performances ==
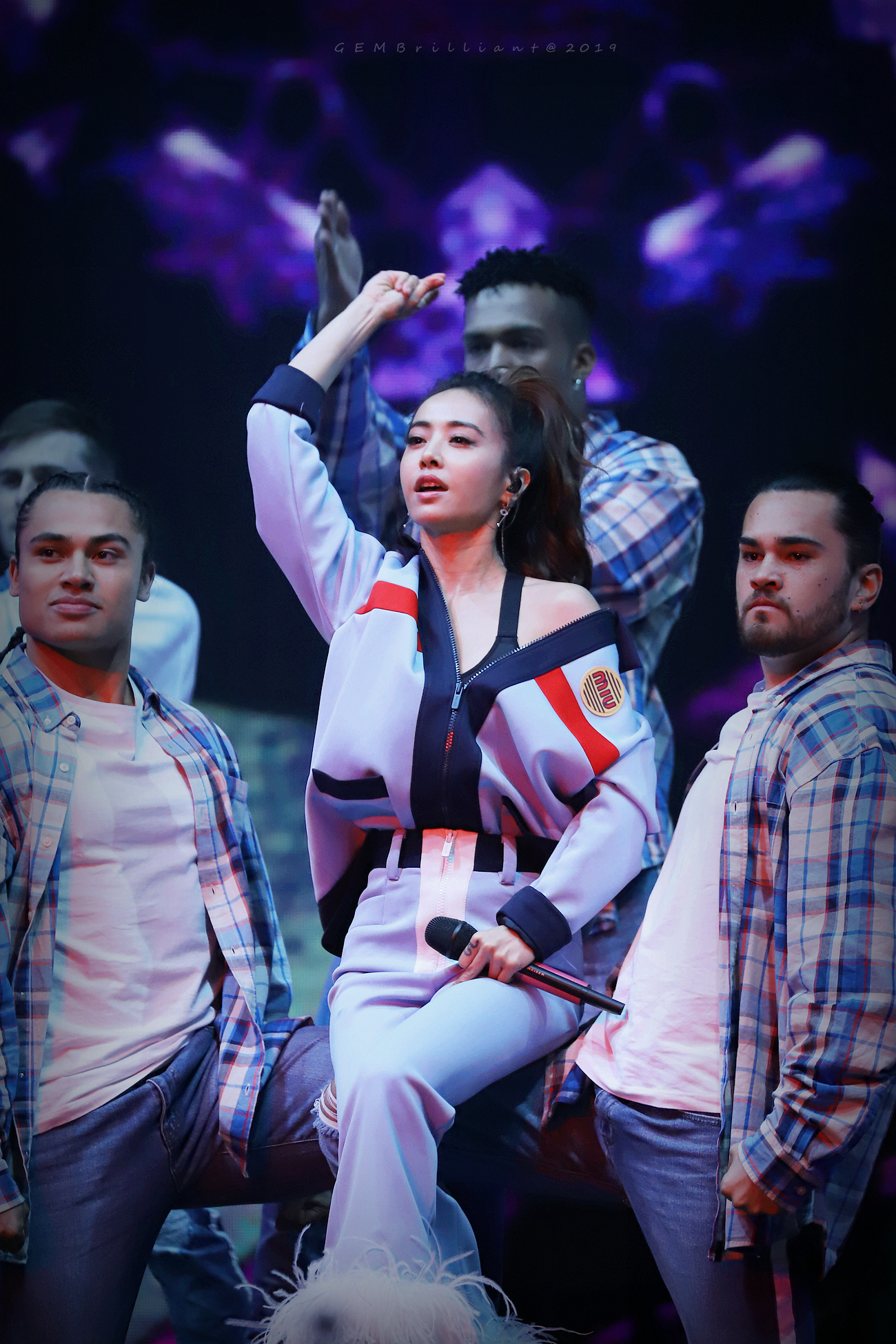
On December 8, 2018, Tsai performed "J-Game" at the 12th Migu Music Awards.

On July 24, 2005, Tsai performed the track at the 7th CCTV-MTV Music Awards and later performed it on TVB's variety show Jade Solid Gold on July 31, 2005. She also featured the song at the 2005 Metro Radio Mandarin Hits Music Awards on August 5, 2005, followed by a performance at the Taipei Pop Music Festival on August 20, 2005.

The song was part of Tsai's setlist at the 5th Global Chinese Music Awards on September 3, 2005, and she later performed it at the opening gala of the 7th Nanning International Folk Song Arts Festival on October 19, 2005, and at the China (Taizhou) Internet Music Festival Concert on October 25, 2005.

Tsai included "J-Game" in her setlist at the 2005 Kaohsiung New Year's Eve Concert on December 31, 2005, and performed it at the 12th China Music Awards on January 11, 2006. She continued to feature the song in her performances at the 2006 Hito Music Awards on January 21 and on TVB's Jade Solid Gold on February 22, 2006.

== Credits and personnel ==
- Paula Ma – backing vocals
- Fan Ya-cheng – recording engineering
- AJ Chen – recording engineering
- A-Tai – recording engineering
- M.E Studio – recording studio
- Dave Yang – mixing engineering
- Dave Yang Recording Studio – mixing studio

== Release history ==
Release dates and formats for "J-Game"
Region	Date	Format(s)	Distributor
Taiwan	April 13, 2005	Radio airplay	Sony BMG
