= Southeast Music Chart Awards =

Southeast Music Chart Awards (Chinese: 东南劲爆音乐榜颁奖典礼), is a Chinese music awards ceremony that is presented by SETV, which created a pop music news TV program called FeiChangYinYue, featuring Southeast Music Chart since 2002.

== Ceremony ==
Year	Date	Venue	Host city	Host	Ref.
2005	October 30	Zuchang Stadium	Jinjiang		
2006	November 11	Fujian Provincial Stadium	Fuzhou		
2008	November 15		Fuzhou		
2009	November 6				
2010	November 11				
