= Al Kuan =

Malaysian musician

Al Kuan is a Malaysian music producer, recording engineer, songwriter, copyright manager, A&R, columnist, and artists agent.

== Early life ==
The book collection of Kuan's father made Kuan a bookworm since a young age. In elementary school, he read classic literature such as Reader's Digest, Dream of the Red Chamber, Journey to the West, Romance of the Three Kingdoms, and biographies. From middle school onwards, he read Coconut House and practiced more writing.

When he started working, Kuan felt that his peers’ conversations were not deep enough, so he would write his views on internet blogs. Once, his article made it to the homepage of Tomorrow Times, which attracted the attention of Taiwanese netizens.

== Career ==
=== Early career ===
After graduating with a background in recording engineering in 1994, Kuan has been working in the pop music industry. He worked as a record engineer in the early stage of his career, and became a producer in 1997. The first album he produced was Juelong Zhang's "Zuopin 1997". After 2000, Kuan began to write songs. His work “Zuotian 昨天" was chosen by Salsa Chen and became his first released song, published in Fish Leung's album “Courage 勇氣”. After he released another song “Kuai Le Shi Zi Zhao De 快樂是自找的" by Bibi Chao, he was invited by Francis Lee to write the song “Yuan Zui 原罪" for Karen Mok.

Kuan later joined the OP company FunkieMonkies founded by Eric Ng and Xiaohan. Since 2007, he has also been a writer in Warner Chappell Music.

=== Songwriter and producer ===
Kuan's works include Michael Wong and Gary Chaw's “Shao Nian 少年”, Fish Leung's “Acceptance 接受”, Jolin Tsai's “Alone 一個人”, Tiger Huang's “Expecting Love 對愛期待”, Aska Yang's “Dui Ai Ke Wang 對愛渴望”, Jess Lee's “Separation 分隔線”, Show Luo's “Anonymous Sadness 不具名的悲傷", Eric Lin's “Nei Shang 內傷", Della's “Yi Ban 一半", Z Chen's “Ni Ai Shang De Wo 你愛上的我", etc. He has been actively promoting the works of Singapore and Malaysia artists, and have been participating in the production of a number of albums by singers at home and abroad. He also serves as the judge for talent competition TV shows from time to time.

In 2014, Kuan, agent Shuting Li and music producer Clement founded Dachafan Entertainment Agency 大茶飯娛樂經紀. In addition to training singers and artists, he also produces music for large-scale talent shows. He is also one of the music directors of The Voice SGMY.

=== Writer and film production ===
In 2010, Kuan published the book “Wu Fen Zhong Wan Shi 五分鐘完事". His writings were also published in major press media in Malaysia, like in columns in Sin Chew Daily, China Press, and Nuyou Singapore.

In 2019, under the invitation of ASTRO TV, Kuan served as the screenplay of the film documenting 50 years of Malaysian Chinese music, "At the Equator". The film is currently the most complete documentary in the Malaysian Chinese music industry. Involving more than 100 local artists, musicians, and production crews, the film demonstrates the development and evolution of the Malaysian music industry over the past 50 years.

Kuan hopes that through this program, singers, musicians, and fans of different generations can review the legacies of the past and at the same time keep up with the new trends. This will allow both parties to understand each other's mindset and attitude about music. He hopes that the film can serve as the bridge between the two generations: "Some predecessors don’t make an effort to understand the young, whether what they do or what the influencers say. The previous generation should take a good look at what the younger generations is doing, instead of merely saying that they are all superficial. As for the new generation, they also need to be aware of the past, so they can appreciate what’s been cultivated and understand who started everything in the first place.”

In 2020, Kuan established “Xun Ren Qi Shi 尋人啟事" video production company, officially setting foot in the field of video production.

== Artistry ==
=== Production mindset ===
During his 7 or 8 years as an engineer, Kuan had heard numerous singers perform, and in turn cultivated his sensitivity to lyrics. He knows how to write words with impact, and at the same time considering the singer's capability to deliver. Sometimes the structure of the song is not easy to fill Chinese words in with limited rhymes. There are quite a few things to consider when it comes to lyrics writing.

When writing a song, most of the time that Kuan spent was on immersing himself into the song, while the actual writing process usually comes fast. If not disturbed, he is capable of delivering even under a tight deadline. Rainie Yang's “Qi Shi Wo Men Zhi De Xing Fu 其實我們值得幸福" was written just before the deadline while he sat in a cafe abroad.

Kuan likes to write narrative things, and he has written a lot of non-love songs. For example, Nicholas Teo's “Gei Peng You De Hua 給朋友的話" is written for friends who are sick, and Rainie Yang's “Qi Shi Wo Men Zhi De Xing Fu 其實我們值得幸福" is written for girls’ friendship.

Kuan's favorite lyrics include Jonathan Lee's “Shan Qiu 山丘", Wyman Wong's "Bitter Melon" written for Eason Chan, and "When the Grapes Are Mature". He has also made several attempts to write his own life into songs, and published similar works such as “Anonymous Sadness 不具名的悲傷", “Flyer 空中飛人", “Perhaps 如果”, etc.

=== Encouragement for new talents ===
Kuan is optimistic about the prospects of the songwriters in the younger generation. He feels that the Internet generation is exposed to a lot of things; they do not have a specific pattern, are independent, and can deliver unexpected results that are interesting and unique. He encourages the new generation of songwriters not to worry about the songs being chosen or not, but rather they should live their lives to the fullest in order to write good songs that can touch people's hearts.

== Works ==
Singer	Song
Della	一半、倒不如
Cyndi Wang	陳淑芬與林志豪、碰碰
Yu Heng	公民心事、Life、有你多好、朋友們都結婚去了、最後、還是一個人、微笑的理由（與梁靜茹合唱）、不鏽鋼（與蕭賀碩合唱）
Vaness Wu	放手
Jess Lee	分隔線、如果愛是星光
Winnie Hsin	空窗
Genie Chuo	靜電
Eric Lin	內傷、不夠狠、還原
Shin	恨愛不成鋼、趁我
Victor Wong	拼圖、桃花、轉捩點
Stefanie Sun	關於
John Yuan	幸福、幸福的顏色
Power Station	陪你面對
Z Chen	你愛上的我、寂寞有罪
Nicholas Teo	日日夜夜、愛你勝過自己、人生沒有如果、之間、如果、年華、低調、明白、相信、偶像歌手、寂寞成自然、這首歌、最好的快要發生、就微笑了、給朋友的話、過度期、Your Heart My Heart
Gary Chaw	借我一輩子、少年（與光良合唱）
Gigi Leung	遊牧民族
Fish Leung	你還在不在、昨天、旅程、接受、眼淚的地圖、這一天
Karen Mok	原罪
Tan Tyzz Chau	失敗俱樂部、如果冬夜一個旅人、抽象、馬拉松、動物感傷、就這樣、駱駝、Carry On、Fine
Andrew Tan	抱歉
Matilda Tao	如果只有一夜
Tedd Chan	一百歲、我不會忘記
Tiger Huang	人生嘿、聖人、對愛期待
Qiming Huang	多年以後、沒有時間感傷、新情歌、為了他
Jing Wong	我會一直記得、懶
Rainie Yang	其實我們值得幸福、差一個擁抱、掛失的青春
Aska Yang	對愛渴望（與蔡健雅合唱）
Bibi Chau	快樂是自找的
Jolin Tsai	一個人、我要的選擇
Joi Chua	一刻曖昧、老朋友
Ricky Hsiao	慢慢走
Show Luo	力量、不具名的悲傷、空中飛人
Baby	我不愛你了、我們都沒錯、男人與小孩、愛你到永遠、Falling in Love

== Awards ==
Year	Organization	Award	Song
2020	AIM	Best Mini Album	The World Will Remember My Name 這世界終會記得我的名字 (Co-produced with Qixian Xiao)
2018	Malaysia PWH Music Award	Best Mini Pop Album	Nicholas Teo “To be…Nicholas 怎樣的張棟樑” (Co-produced with Nicholas Teo and Zichau Chen)
2018	Malaysia PWH Music Award	Top 10 Singles (international)	Rainie Yang “Qi Shi Wo Men Zhi De Xing Fu 其實我們值得幸福"
2018	Malaysia PWH Music Award	Top 10 Singles (local)	Nicholas Teo “There’s No If 人生沒有如果”
2018	Malaysia PWH Music Award	Top 10 Singles (local)	Mei Sim Hoon “Himalayas 喜馬拉雅”
2018	Malaysia PWH Music Award	Top 10 Singles (local)	Nicholas Teo “What Have You Become? 現在你是怎樣的人”
2016	AIM	Best Lyricist	Nicholas Teo “What Have You Become? 現在你是怎樣的人”
2016	AIM	Best Song Production	Nian Hua 年華 (Co-produced with Nicholas Teo and Zichau Chen)
2016	AIM	Best Album	Nicholas Teo “To be…Nicholas 怎樣的張棟樑” (Co-produced with Nicholas Teo and Zichau Chen)
2016	AIM	Best Song of the Year	Nicholas Teo “There’s No If 人生沒有如果”
2015	Malaysia PWH Music Award	Top 10 Singles (international)	Yu Heng Shuo Hsiao “Bu Xiu Gang 不鏽鋼”
2012	Malaysia PWH Music Award	Top 10 Singles (local)	Yu Heng “Life!?”
2012	Malaysia PWH Music Award	Top 10 Singles (local)	Vivian Tsai “Li Kai 離開”
2012	Malaysia PWH Music Award	Top 10 Singles (international)	Della “Yi Ban 一半”
2012	Malaysia PWH Music Award	Most Popular Song (Silver)	Della “Yi Ban 一半”
2009	AIM	Best Chinese Singles (local)	Man Jiang Hong 滿江紅
2008	Malaysia PWH Music Award	Top 10 Singles (local)	Nicholas Teo “Perhaps 如果”
2006	Malaysia PWH Music Award	Top 10 Singles (local)	Michael Wong+Gary Chaw “Shao Nian 少年”
2001	AIM	Best Recording Engineer	
