= Prague Square =

"Prague Square (Jolin Version)"

Single by Jolin Tsai
- Language: Mandarin
- Released: February 25, 2026
- Studio: BB Road (Taipei)
- Genre: Pop
- Length: 3:12
- Label: Universal; Eternal
- Composer: Jay Chou
- Lyricist: Vincent Fang
- Producer: Jolin Tsai

Jolin Tsai singles chronology
"DIY" (2025)	"Prague Square (Jolin Version)" (2026)	"Emoji" (2026)

Music video
- "Prague Square (Jolin Version)" on YouTube

"Prague Square (Jolin Version)" (Chinese: 布拉格廣場; pinyin: Bùlāgé guǎngchǎng) is a song by Taiwanese singer Jolin Tsai. Written by Jay Chou and Vincent Fang, and produced by Tsai, it was released on February 25, 2026, through Universal. The song serves as the theme for Starlux Airlines' new Taipei–Prague route. The 2026 version is a re-recording of the track originally included on Tsai's fifth studio album, Magic (2003).

== Background ==
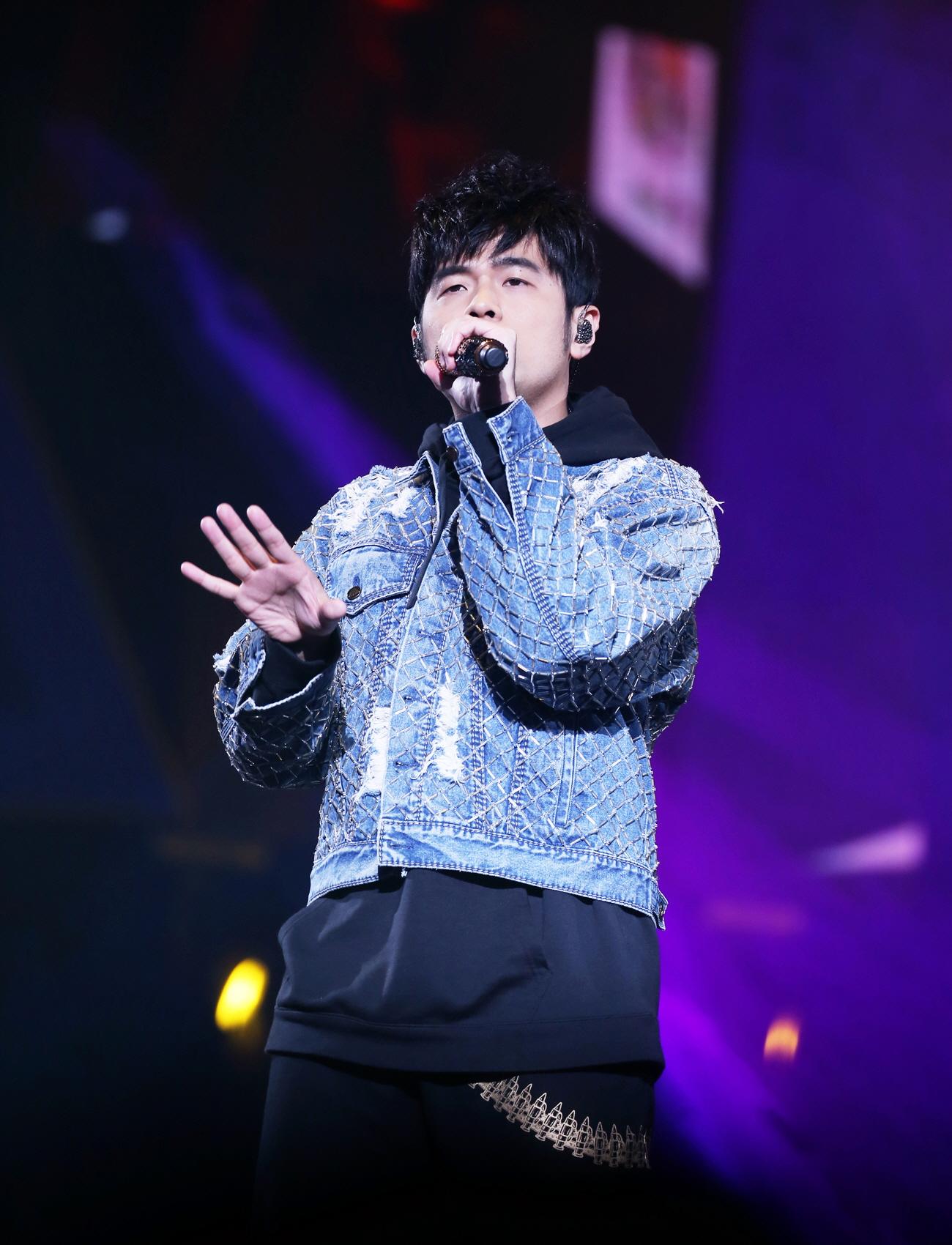
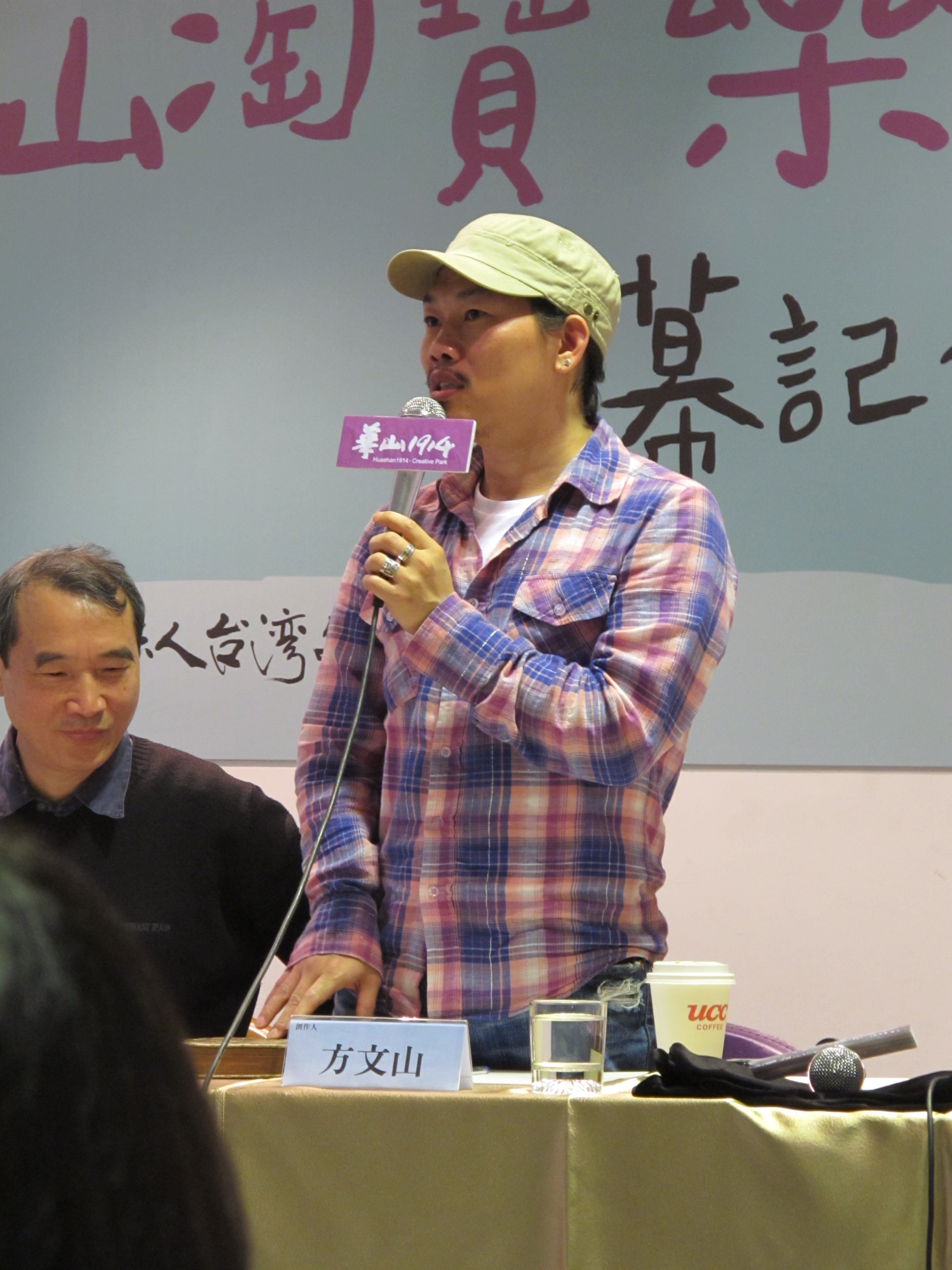
Jay Chou (left) and Vincent Fang (right) wrote "Prague Square" for Tsai's 2003 album, Magic.

The original "Prague Square" was released in 2003 and became one of Tsai's representative songs. Inspired by Prague, the lyrics reference Gothic architecture and European scenery. While the song mentions landmarks in Prague, the original music video was filmed in Taiwan. A lyric referring to a wishing fountain in Old Town Square drew discussion, as no such fountain exists.

== Release and promotion ==
Ahead of Starlux Airlines' Taipei–Prague service, a 15-second promotional teaser featuring the instrumental introduction of "Prague Square" was released on the airline's social media. The video shows Tsai in a captain's uniform approaching a Starlux aircraft. Tsai also shared footage filmed in Prague on her personal social media.

The single was officially released on February 25, 2026, as the theme for the route launch. The inaugural Taipei–Prague flight is scheduled for August 1, 2026, with limited promotional offers.

== Composition and production ==
The 2003 version combined classical elements with Mandopop production. The "Jolin Version" uses alternative R&B and hip-hop elements with electronic textures. Tsai served as producer for the 2026 version, revisiting the song with a contemporary perspective. Musical coordination was provided by Howe Chen, with arrangement by electronic musician Flowstrong. The song is built on emphatic hip-hop drum beats and a fluid low-frequency groove, with syncopation and synthesizers creating relaxed, layered textures that drift into a dreamlike atmosphere. Tsai adopts a lighter, more unrestrained vocal style, using her voice with expressive flexibility and performing the rap herself. Her delivery shifts smoothly from intimate whispers in the verses to a clear, expansive chorus, likened to light passing through stained glass and casting vivid, kaleidoscopic colors.

== Music video ==
The 2026 project finally allowed Tsai to fulfill a vision that had remained unrealized during the original release by filming the music video in Prague. The new version was shot on location across the city, featuring landmarks such as Old Town Square, the Astronomical Clock, the Vltava River, and Charles Bridge. In the video, Tsai takes on multiple roles, including an inaugural captain and a series of allegorical figures representing different stages of self-reflection. The narrative builds toward a symbolic reconciliation between past and present selves.

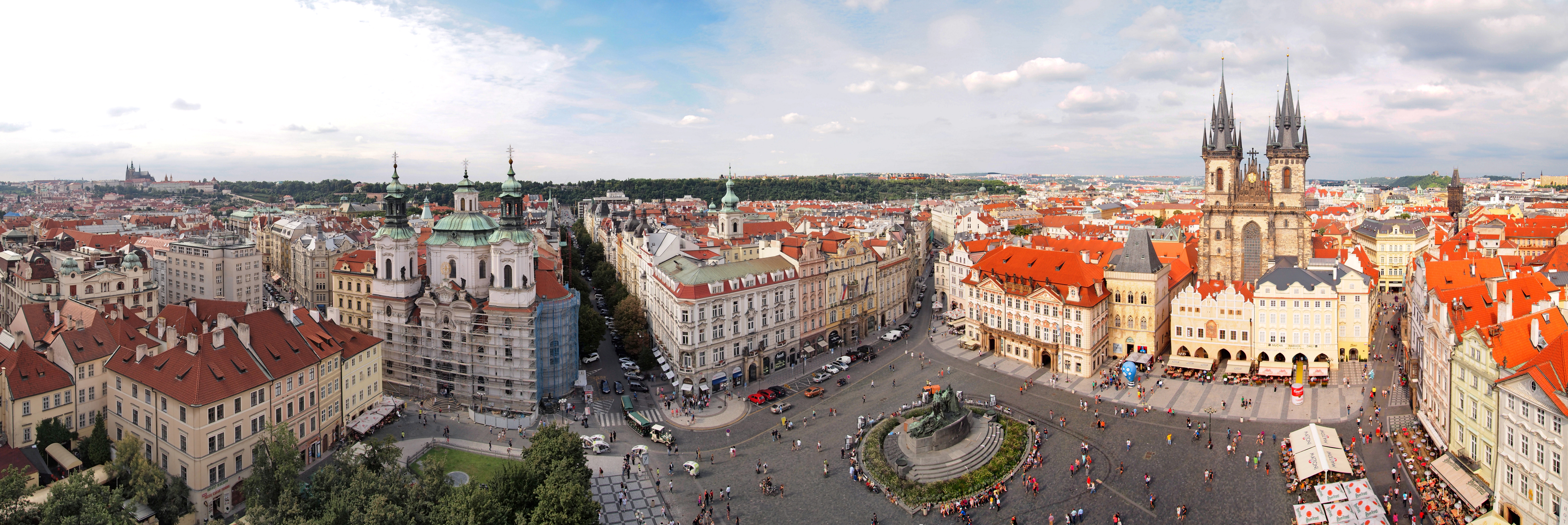
The music video for the 2026 version of "Prague Square" was filmed on location in Prague, including Old Town Square.

== Credits and personnel ==
Credits are adapted from the description of the music video for "Prague Square (Jolin Version)" on YouTube.

Music

- Jolin Tsai – production
- Flowstrong – music arrangement
- Elin Lee – production coordination
- AJ Chen – recording engineering
- BB Road Studio – recording studio
- Chris Galland – mixing, mastering
- Howe Chen – executive production
- Eric Chang – recording assistance

Video

Taiwan team

- Birdy Production – production house
- Tsai Hsing-lin – executive production
- Birdy Nio – direction
- Sean Lin – assistant direction
- Poliz Cheng – production
- Joy Wang – production
- Isred Chan – production assistance
- Cheng Chen-yueh – production assistance
- John Jackson – actor, the monk
- Nuala Susan Rice – actor, the girl
- Florian van Delft – actor, the artist
- Julian Yu – acting
- Taina Hao – acting
- Norma Hsi – acting

Czech team

- Lonely Production – production house
- Michal Sikora – production
- Gabriela Daniels – production management
- Leona Kunayová – production assistance
- Jakub Hamerský – production
- Michael Gajdošech – actor, the knight

== Charts ==
=== Weekly charts ===
Chart (2026)	Peak position
China (Tencent)	62

== Release history ==
Release dates and formats for "Prague Square (Jolin Version)"
Region	Date	Format(s)	Distributor
Various	February 25, 2026	Digital download; streaming	Universal
