= Tan Boon Wah =

Singaporean singer-songwriter

Tan Boon Wah (born 21 October; simplified Chinese: 陈文华; traditional Chinese: 陳文華; pinyin: Chén Wénhuá) is a Singaporean songwriter. He is also a practicing real estate lawyer.

== Early life and education ==
Tan Boon Wah studied at The Chinese High School between 1988 and 1991 for his secondary school education, and subsequently at Hwa Chong Junior College between 1992 and 1993 for his pre-university education. He studied law in National University of Singapore, and was called to the bar in 2001.

== Career ==
=== Legal career ===
Since graduating from NUS, Tan Boon Wah has been working at Allen & Gledhill, a Singapore law firm, and is a real estate lawyer and a partner at the firm.

=== Songwriting ===
Tan started writing songs during his undergraduate days, with his first song Don't Wish To Let You Know (不想讓你知道) sang by Where Chou in 1999. The song was also Chou's debut song. Its EP was 50,000 copies when it was released. The song was shortlisted by China Music Awards as one of the top performing songs in 1999. Over the years, he cooperated with singers like Stefanie Sun, Stella Chang, A-Mei, Elva Hsiao, Andy Lau, and Tiger Huang. The songs he’s written included Tanya Chua’s Starting Point (原點), Stefanie Sun’s Love Dictionary (愛情字典), Jolin Tsai’s The Choice I Want (我要的選擇), and A-Mei’s A Brighter Future (海闊天空).

Tan took a break from songwriting to concentrate on his legal career in 2005, before resuming songwriting after his career was established. He subsequently started writing songs in his free time, with the earnings from his legal career providing him a stable income.

In 2020, Tan co-wrote the theme song Your Name Engraved Herein (刻在我心底的名字) for the movie of the same name (in English, its Chinese title 刻在你心底的名字). The movie box office exceeded more than 100 million NT dollars in Taiwan, and the theme song won the first place in various major charts. The song’s music video hit more than 7.5 million views on YouTube in two months. The song also won the “Best Original Song” in the 57th Golden Horse Awards and the “Song of the Year” in the 32nd Golden Melody Awards. It has been covered by singers such as Fish Leung, Waa Wei, and Weibird. The song, however, has been accused of plagiarism. The three co-writers and Warner Chappell Music together issued a statement through their lawyers denying the allegations.

=== Singer ===
In 2021, Tan released his first single Everlasting (長長久久), which he completed during his quarantine at the hotel for the trip to Taipei to attend the Golden Horse Awards Ceremony in 2020.

== Works ==
Singer	Works
Tanya Chua	愛情的路、失憶症
Stefanie Sun	愛情字典
Tanya Chua & Stefanie Sun	原點
Amei	海闊天空
Where Chou	不想讓你知道、Hold me tight
Stella Chang	看花火
Crowd Lu	刻在我心底的名字
Tiger Huang	Lonely Christmas
Elva Hsiao	你看不見的地方
Andy Lau	未知數
Jolin Tsai	我要的選擇
Angel Hou	心想飛
Sun Ho	安徒生
Sharon Kwan	不遠的親人
Lei Zhang	後來你好嗎
wow 頭號人物	I believe in love
Yisa Yu	假設
Afalian Lufic	離心力
Janice Yan	閻羅王
Tian Tian Han	摘花人與花
Celest Chong	愛的副作用
Ambrose Hui	愛情倒退

== Awards ==
Year	Organization	Award	Work	Result
2020	57th Golden Horse Awards	Best Original Song	Your Name Engraved Herein 刻在我心底的名字	Won
2021	2020 YAHOO! Asia Buzz Awards	Popular Taiwanese Film Song	Your Name Engraved Herein 刻在我心底的名字	Won
2021	2nd Taiwan Film Critics Society Awards	Special Recognition - Original Theme Song	Your Name Engraved Herein 刻在我心底的名字	Nominated
2021	2021 Hito Pop Music Awards	Hito Theme Song for Movies	Your Name Engraved Herein 刻在我心底的名字	Won
2021	32rd Golden Melody Awards	Song of the Year	Your Name Engraved Herein 刻在我心底的名字	Won
