= Awa Manneh =

Swedish R&B/soul singer (born 1982)

Awa Manneh (born 7 January 1982) is a Swedish R&B/soul singer. She has been the lead singer of the music group Blacknuss. As a solo singer she is known for the songs All yours, "Hip Hop Ballad", "Behind Schedule" and "Say a little prayer". The song All yours she made along with Thomas Rusiak.

In 2003, she was voted "Sexiest Swedish woman of the year" by QX.

== Personal life ==
Born in Sweden, Manneh is of Gambian descent.

== Discography ==
=== Singles ===
Title	Year	Peak chart positions	Album
Title	Year	SWE	Album
"Hip Hop Ballad"	2002	32	Non-album singles
