= Francis Lee (lyricist) =

- Occupation: Lyricist & writer
- Awards: Golden Melody Awards

Chinese name
- Traditional Chinese: 李焯雄
- Simplified Chinese: 李焯雄
Transcriptions
Standard Mandarin
- Hanyu Pinyin: li3 zhuo2 xiong4
- Musical career
- Genre: Mandarin pop/ Cantopop

Francis Lee or Zhuoxiong Li, (李焯雄 in Chinese) is a critically acclaimed Chinese-pop lyricist, who has won 2 "Best Lyricist Awards" (14th for Karen Mok's "Love" or 莫文蔚 愛 and 26th for Karen Mok's "Departures/ BuSan, BuJian" or 莫文蔚 不散，不見） in Taiwan’s "Golden Melody Awards"（金曲奬）. He has also written theme songs for movies and TV drama as well as commercials, including John Woo’s (吳宇森)"Red Cliff:Part 1"赤壁．上（心·戰 ～RED CLIFF～ or "Heart, War～RED CLIFF～" ） and "Red Cliff:Part 2"赤壁．下（赤壁 〜大江東去〜 or "Red Cliff 〜River Of No Return"）.

His other international projects include the Chinese version of the theme song "Wavin' Flag" to 2010 FIFA World Cup sung by Jacky Cheung (張學友, Zhang Xue-you), Jane Zhang (張靚穎 Zhang Liang Ying) and K'naan.

Francis Lee is also a writer. His most recent publication is 同名同姓的人"People With The Same Name"(September 2016), a collection of short stories, poetry, essays and lyrics.
