= Myself (Jolin Tsai album) =

2010 studio album by Jolin Tsai

- Standard edition cover

Studio album by Jolin Tsai
- Released: August 13, 2010
- Recorded: 2010
- Genre: Pop
- Length: 39:02
- Labels: Warner; Mars
- Producers: Andrew Chen; Adia; Paula Ma

Jolin Tsai chronology
| Love & Live (2009) | Myself (2010) | Ultimate (2012) |

Singles from Myself
- 1. "Honey Trap" Released: 14 July 2010

Myself is the eleventh studio album by Taiwanese singer Jolin Tsai, released on August 13, 2010, by Warner. Centered around the theme of partying, the album features a strong emphasis on dance music, which makes up 80% of its content. It was produced by Adia, Paula Ma, and Andrew Chen.

The album sold over 65,000 copies in Taiwan, ranking as the fourth best-selling album of the year and earning the title of the best-selling album by a female artist in 2010. The music video for the track "Honey Trap" was nominated for Best Music Video at the 22nd Golden Melody Awards.

== Background and development ==
On October 15, 2009, Tsai and her manager, Ke Fu-hung, jointly established Eternal, a company dedicated to managing Tsai's artist representation, music production, music rights, concert organization, and licensing affairs. On March 16, 2010, media outlets reported that Tsai's new album was scheduled for release in July. Warner's Sam Chen revealed that the album would involve several international collaborations, with an investment exceeding NT$50 million.

On June 14, 2010, the song "Take Immediate Action" was released through China Mobile's 12530 Migu Music platform. On July 12, 2010, Tsai attended the launch event for China's Got Talent and released the show's promotional anthem, "Black-Haired Beautiful Girl", during the event.

On July 15, 2010, Warner announced that the album would be available for pre-order starting July 20 and scheduled for release on August 3. However, on July 21, 2010, Warner announced that pre-orders would be postponed to July 22, and the release date pushed to August 10. Ultimately, the album's release was rescheduled again and officially launched on August 13.

== Writing and recording ==
The album's lead single, "Honey Trap", is a deep bass house track characterized by rich synthesizer textures and seductive lyrics. Tsai delivers a low, sultry vocal style using a rapping technique. The interlude "Missed Call" continues the melody of "Honey Trap", incorporating the sound of unanswered phone calls to depict the emotional turmoil of romantic confusion. "Love Player" is a mid-tempo Eurodance love song that tells the story of a playboy caught between two women. This style marked Tsai's first foray into this genre, and she expressed excitement about exploring a rhythmic love song.

The interlude "Secret Talk" features voicemail messages and friends urging her on, capturing the loneliness after a breakup. "Party Star" incorporates police checkpoint sound effects, enhancing the vivid imagery. The interlude "Let's Start the Dance" pays tribute to veteran Vogue dancers and references the influence of drag queen culture. "Black-Haired Beautiful Girl" blends disco elements to portray the unique style and strength of Oriental women, showcasing a feminist attitude. "Nothing Left to Say" fuses contemporary R&B with soft rock, where piano tones complement the R&B rhythms, emphasizing emotional release.

The interlude "L'amour est parti", performed in French language, presents a cinematic breakup scene. "Real Hurt" features simple yet touching lyrics that express vulnerability and freedom in love. "Macho Babe" reflects modern women's independence and courage, with Tsai stating its intention to highlight female empowerment. "Butterflies in My Stomach" incorporates exotic flavors and explores ambiguous feelings between a man and a woman. "Let's Break Up" carries a tone of sorrow and resolve. The interlude "I Love You Too" evokes nostalgia for pure love. "Take Immediate Action" is a mid-tempo sweet love song with rhythms designed for strong physical interaction.

== Title and artwork ==
On July 4, 2010, Warner announced the album's tentative title as Jolin Tsai Self-Titled Album: Vogue. Tsai commented, "This is the album I have been most involved with since my debut, showcasing my truest self. I am very excited—it is the most thrilling album I have made so far." She added, "'Vogue' for me represents an attitude, a spirit, and a sense of confidence—not just a symbol of appearance or glamorous fashion. The Vogue I envision embodies a lifestyle and authenticity. I know who I am!" On July 14, 2010, Warner revised the album title to Jolin Tsai Self-Titled Album: Vogueing, inspired by the Vogue dance style. They emphasized that adding "ing" to "Vogue" conveys a sense of ongoing action in the present moment.

Then, on July 21,2010, the album's final title was announced as Myself. Tsai explained, "'Myself' represents me. I paid close attention to every aspect of this album—from lyrics and song selection to styling and music videos—and invested a great deal of effort, which is why I named it 'Myself'." The album includes ten songs, eight of which are dance tracks. She said, "This is the first time I have included so many dance songs in an album. Although many of my previous songs were dance tracks, this time I especially emphasize the 'party' concept, hoping to bring joy to everyone." Additionally, the album features five interludes—a first for her—drawing inspiration from Western albums she has listened to.

On the official album cover, Tsai appears with platinum blonde hair and a white space suit, while the pre-order edition features her wearing a ripped T-shirt and hot pants. Tsai remarked, "This time, I experimented with different styles, from strong shoulder pads and cutouts to T-shaped outfits, showcasing a healthier kind of sexiness. The platinum hair gives me a futuristic vibe, perfect for summer, and highlights muscle lines."

== Release and promotion ==
On August 13, 2010, Tsai held a press conference in Beijing, China, to officially launch the album. On October 29, 2010, she released a deluxe edition, which included six additional remixed tracks, six music videos, and a behind-the-scenes documentary of the album's production. On December 28, 2010, Tsai also released a vinyl edition of the album.

=== Singles ===
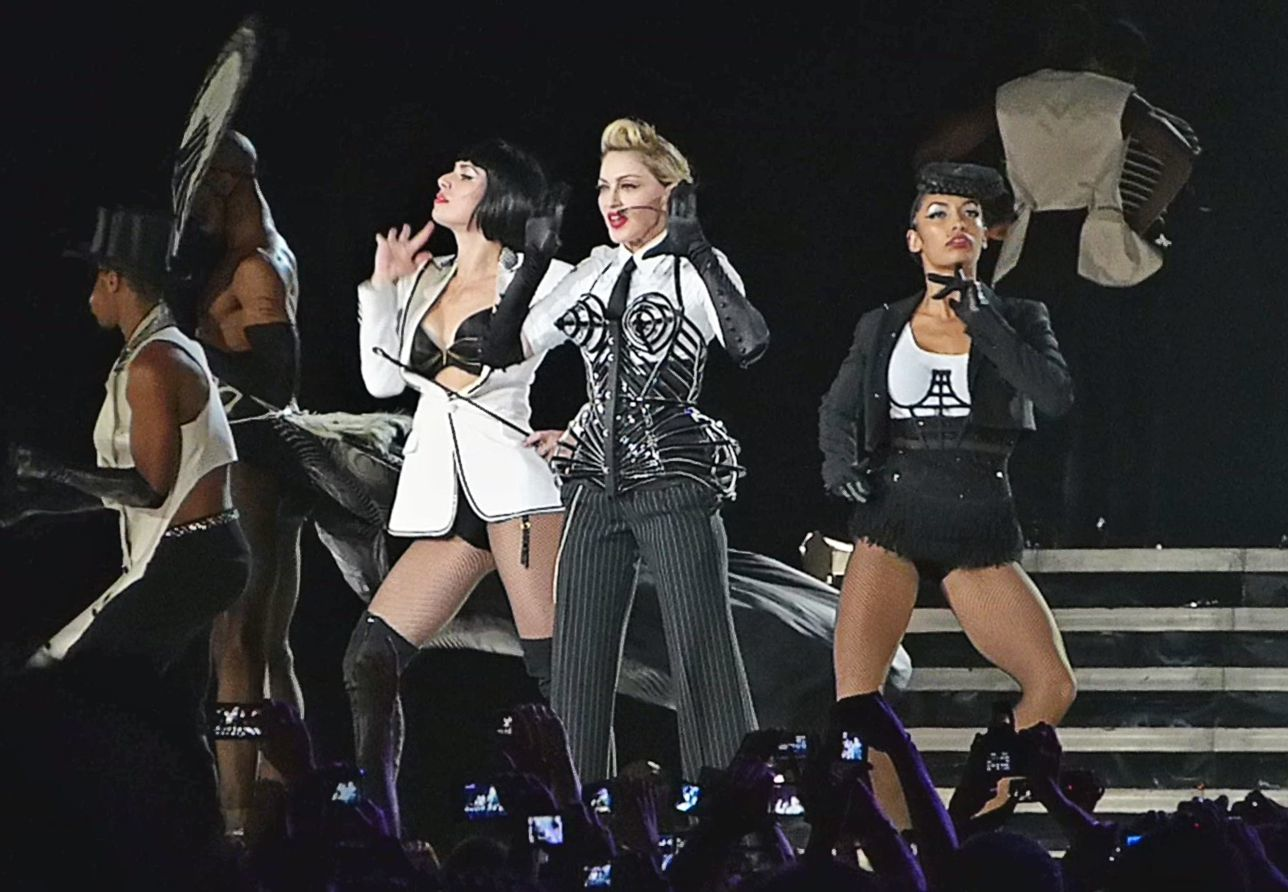
"Honey Trap" pays tribute to Madonna, with Tsai performing the vogue dance popularized by Madonna in its music video.

On July 14, 2010, Tsai released the single "Honey Trap". The music video, directed by Cha Eun-taek and costing NT$10 million to produce, premiered on July 27. In the video, Tsai performs vogue dance. She shared, "When I first heard the demo of 'Honey Trap', I wanted to dance in a voguing style. So, I asked Teacher Bruce Chang to help me find an instructor, and we eventually found a vogue teacher from the American reality show America's Next Top Model. This teacher not only taught me the dance moves but also explained the origins of voguing and emphasized the confidence and attitude behind the dance." The song also pays tribute to Tsai's icon Madonna. She said, "When it comes to vogue, you naturally think of Madonna's iconic song 'Vogue'. Her ever-changing image and dedication have always inspired me deeply."

On October 20, 2010, Tsai released the single "Honey Trap" (Dance with Me remix), which included a remix of the song "Macho Babe" (Cheerleading remix). The "Honey Trap" remix was produced by George Leong, while the "Macho Babe" remix was done by Oscar.

=== Music videos ===
On August 8, 2010, Tsai released the music video for the song "Love Player", directed by Marlboro Lai. Tsai was deeply involved in various aspects of the production, including the storyline and the visual tone. The video depicts a playboy caught between two women, with Tsai playing the female lead who uses dance as a therapeutic outlet for her emotional pain. She explained, "The lyrics tell the story of a playboy, but I wanted the director to show that even though the guy causes heartbreak, the woman still lives confidently and well. That was the core message I wanted to convey in the video." This is why the video includes scenes of her dancing seductively and moments of her alone at home.

On August 19, 2010, Tsai released the music video for "Nothing Left to Say", directed by Bill Chia, portraying the sadness and helplessness following a breakup. On September 1, 2010, she released the video for "Butterflies in My Stomach", again directed by Marlboro Lai, using dance to express the song's emotional mood. On September 7, the music video for "Take Immediate Action", also directed by Marlboro Lai, was released, featuring a concept centered around a friends' party. On September 9, 2010, the video for "Real Hurt", directed by Sam Hu, was released, illustrating the loneliness of a woman after heartbreak. On November 1, 2010, Tsai released the music video for "Black-Haired Beautiful Girl", directed by Kuang Sheng.

=== Live performances ===
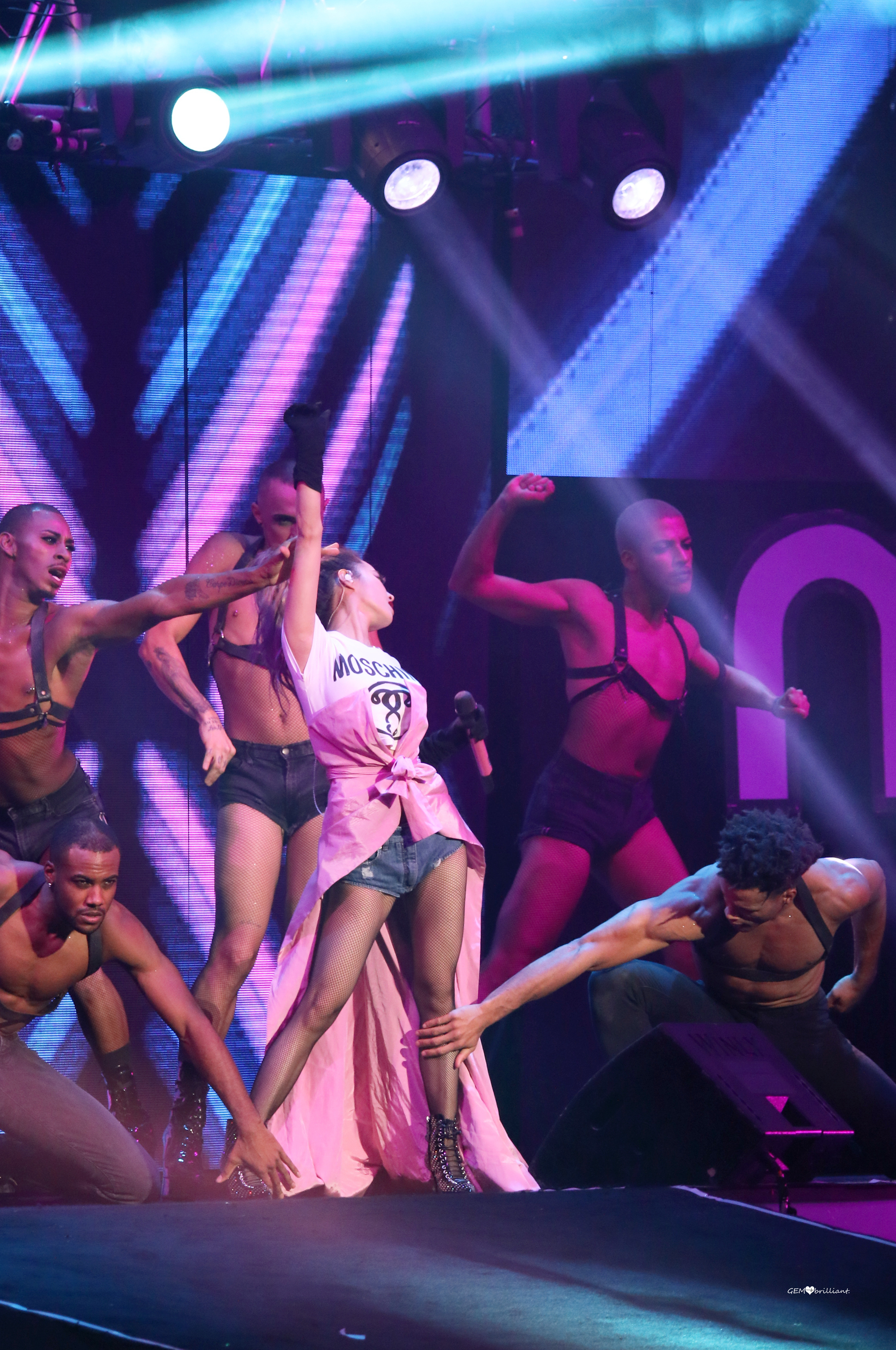
Tsai performed "Honey Trap" at the 10th Migu Music Awards, December 2016

On July 31, 2010, Tsai appeared on the Taiwanese variety show Super King and performed her song "Honey Trap". On August 12, 2010, she appeared on another Taiwanese variety show, Power Sunday, where she again performed "Honey Trap". Later, on August 27, 2010, Tsai participated in the Chinese variety show One Million Star, performing the same track. On September 2, 2010, Tsai appeared on Zhejiang TV's Singing & Dancing, where she performed "Honey Trap", "Love Player", and "Real Hurt". Two days later, on September 4, 2010, she performed "Honey Trap" and "Take Immediate Action" on We Are Family.

On September 22, she performed "Honey Trap" at the 2010 CCTV Mid-Autumn Festival Gala. The same day, she appeared on Jiangsu TV's Happy!, performing "Honey Trap", "Take Immediate Action", and "Real Hurt". On September 24, 2010, Tsai appeared on Hunan TV's Day Day Up, performing "Honey Trap" and "Real Hurt". On October 10, 2010, she participated in the final of China's Got Talent, where she performed "Black-Haired Beautiful Girl".

On December 31, 2010, Tsai performed "Honey Trap" and "Real Hurt" at the New Year's Eve Concert in Kaohsiung. That same evening, she also performed "Honey Trap" and "Take Immediate Action" at another New Year's Eve Concert in Kaohsiung. On April 9, 2011, she took part in the 1st Global Chinese Golden Chart Awards, where she performed "Honey Trap". Later, on April 24, 2011, she appeared at the 2011 Music Radio China Top Chart Awards and performed the same song.

=== Touring ===
On August 26, 2010, Tsai revealed that she would launch a new concert tour around Christmas of the same year. On November 6, 2010, she officially announced her third concert tour, the Myself World Tour, which would kick off on December 24 at the Taipei Arena in Taipei, Taiwan. Centered around the theme of a "nationwide party", the tour aimed to deliver an energetic and celebratory atmosphere. The tour concluded on April 13, 2013, at the Kaohsiung Arena. Spanning two years and four months, it covered 31 cities worldwide, with a total of 35 shows. The tour drew over 600,000 attendees and grossed more than NT$1.5 billion at the box office.

== Commercial performance ==
On August 25, 2010, Tsai announced that the album had reached the number one position on the weekly sales charts of major Taiwanese retailers, including Pok'elai, G-Music, and Five Music. On December 11, 2010, media reports confirmed that the album had sold over 65,000 copies in Taiwan, ranking second on the 2010 annual sales charts of both G-Music and Five Music. It also placed fourth overall on the year-end album sales chart and was recognized as the top-selling album by a female artist that year. Additionally, three songs from the album—"Honey Trap", "Nothing Left to Say", and "Love Player"—ranked on Taiwan's Hit FM Top 100 Singles chart in 2010, securing the number one, number 20, and number 55 spots, respectively.

== Critical reception ==
Professional ratings
Review scores
| Source | Rating |
|---|---|
| Freshmusic | 7/10 |
| Tencent | 3.4/5 stars |

Critic Xiong Zi'ang from NetEase Entertainment remarked that the album marked Tsai's successful transformation into "Diva J". Lead tracks such as "Honey Trap" and "Love Player" were praised for their strong melodies and sophisticated production, standing out as some of the finest Chinese dance tracks in recent years. He also noted the album's cohesiveness, with well-structured arrangements and a logical track sequence. Critic Wang Shuo observed that Tsai did not blindly follow fashion trends but instead used a rock-influenced dance-pop approach that aligned with the mainstream aesthetic for dance music.

Another critic, San Shi Yi Sheng, highlighted that while the album was dominated by up-tempo tracks and individual singles had room for improvement, it possessed strong overall coherence, aligning well with Tsai's image as a dance-pop artist. Liang Xiaohui viewed the album as a successful, though somewhat conservative, experiment, acknowledging both its flaws and the evident innovation and effort from Tsai and her team. Eric from Sina Entertainment noted that the album marked a more mature musical direction than her previous works and solidified her path toward becoming the "Queen of Dance-Pop", fully showcasing her strength in performance.

Critic Liu Shui Ji pointed out that while the vocal performance remained stable and the production leaned more toward a Westernized sound, the album's heavy focus on concept at times came across as gimmicky, failing to fully express Tsai's musical identity and highlighting a disconnect between artistry and commercial strategy. Lin Ju Li added that although the album's concept and intentions were clear, the track selection felt bland and lacked Tsai's signature characteristics, resulting in a project that lacked a distinct personality. NetEase also commented that the album's diversity should not be mistaken for noise—by avoiding covers and overused karaoke hits, Tsai showed a commitment to self-reinvention and broadening the scope of dance music. However, the absence of tracks with clear mainstream hit potential limited the album's overall popularity.

From Tencent Entertainment, critic Lan Hu Die rated the album 3.3 out of 5, praising its stylistic diversity and polished production but noting a lack of the memorable qualities found in Tsai's past work. Critic Lao You gave it a 3.2 out of 5, stating that while the album surpassed Butterfly (2009) in sonic experience and even outshone Agent J (2007) in arrangement fluidity, its melodies were too thin, making the album less memorable. Critic Shu Wa felt the album's concept was overly flashy and gimmick-driven, which negatively impacted its quality and amplified Tsai's artistic tension and contradictions. Lastly, critic Shui Shui argued that the album was overly focused on conceptual presentation, with the interludes failing to offer anything distinctive. Rather than enhancing the album's cohesion, these elements seemed forced and lacked genuine substance.

== Accolades ==
On December 21, 2010, the music video for the song "Honey Trap" won the Youku Index Music Video of the Year at the BQ Top Winner. On January 15, 2011, the song "Love Player" was named one of the Top 10 Most Popular Hong Kong/Taiwan Songs at the 2010 Baidu Boiling Point Awards. On January 16, 2011, Tsai was awarded the Top 10 Singers at the 6th KKBox Music Awards. On January 21, 2011, she received the Best Taiwanese Female Singer at the 10th China Original Music Pop Chart Awards. On February 2, 2011, Tsai was named one of the Top 10 Female Singers at the 2011 Super Star Awards.

On March 26, 2011, she won the Top Overseas Female Singer and the Top Overseas Singer at the 2nd My Astro Music Awards. Additionally, the song "Honey Trap" won Top Dance Song and Top 20 Songs, while "Love Player" was also recognized as one of the Top 20 Songs. On April 9, 2011, Tsai received the Most Popular Female Singer and the DJ's Favorite Artist at the 1st Global Chinese Golden Chart Awards. The song "Honey Trap" topped the Hit FM's chart and was named one of the Top 20 Songs. On April 24, 2011, Tsai was awarded the Most Popular Hong Kong/Taiwan Artist of the Year at the Music Radio China Top Char Awards. "Honey Trap" also won the Most Played Song and Best Hong Kong/Taiwan Songs of the Year.

On May 13, 2011, the music video for "Honey Trap" was nominated for Best Music Video at the 22nd Golden Melody Awards. On June 24, 2011, Tsai won the Most Searched Female Singer at the 5th Migu Music Awards. On August 17, 2011, she was named one of the Top 10 Most Popular Stars at the 2nd Top 10 Stars Award. On December 14, 2011, Tsai was awarded the Most Popular Female Artist at the 3rd Yahoo! Kimo Popularity Awards. On December 22, 2011, she received the Best Female Singer at the 1st Apple Daily Music Awards.

== Track listing ==
Myself – Standard / Take 2 – Dance with Me edition
| No. | Title | Lyrics | Music | Producer(s) | Length |
|---|---|---|---|---|---|
| 1. | "Honey Trap" (美人計) | Luke Tsui; Gino Chen | Danielle Senior; Scott Wild | Andrew Chen | 3:34 |
| 2. | "Missed Call" (interlude) | | Andrew Chen | | 0:28 |
| 3. | "Love Player" (玩愛之徒) | Gino Chen | Gabriel Ssezibwa; Rene Prang; Lars Quang; Nik Quang | Andrew Chen | 3:26 |
| 4. | "Secret Talk" (interlude) | | Andrew Chen | | 0:26 |
| 5. | "Party Star" (派大星) | Matthew Yen | Gabriel Ssezibwa; Rene Prang; Lars Quang; Nik Quang | Andrew Chen | 3:53 |
| 6. | "Let's Start the Dance" (interlude) | | Andrew Chen; Jolin Tsai | | 0:45 |
| 7. | "Black-Haired Beautiful Girl" (黑髮尤物) | Matthew Yen | Jonas Saeed; Pia Sjöberg | Adia | 3:23 |
| 8. | "Nothing Left to Say" (無言以對) | Neoh Kim Hin | Ooi Teng Fong | Andrew Chen | 3:46 |
| 9. | "L'amour est parti" (interlude) | | Andrew Chen | | 0:27 |
| 10. | "Real Hurt" (小傷口) | David Ke | Jackey Yow | Paula Ma | 4:28 |
| 11. | "Macho Babe" (娘子漢) | Luke Tsui | Jo Hyun-chul | Adia | 3:20 |
| 12. | "Butterflies in My Stomach" (七上八下) | Andrew Chen; Gino Chen | Andrew Chen | Andrew Chen | 3:31 |
| 13. | "Let's Break Up" (解散愛) | David Ke | Tan Vui Chuan | Adia | 4:09 |
| 14. | "I Love You Too" (interlude) | | Andrew Chen | | 0:08 |
| 15. | "Take Immediate Action" (即時生效) | Neoh Kim Hin | Ooi Teng Fong | Adia | 3:18 |
| Total length: | | | | | 39:02 |

Myself – Take 2 – Dance with Me edition (CD 2)
| No. | Title | Remixer(s) | Length |
|---|---|---|---|
| 1. | "Honey Trap" (Dance with Me remix) | George Leong | 6:36 |
| 2. | "Butterflies in My Stomach" (Heart Beating remix) | DJ George Leong | 6:00 |
| 3. | "Macho Babe" (Cheerleading remix) | DJ Oscar | 4:27 |
| 4. | "Love Player" (I Know You remix) | Andrew Chen | 6:17 |
| 5. | "Party Star" (Don't Stop remix) | DJ M@rio | 6:36 |
| 6. | "Myself 5 in 1 mashup remix" | DJ Oscar | 6:30 |
| Total length: | | | 36:26 |

Myself – Take 2 – Dance with Me edition (DVD 1)
| No. | Title | Length |
|---|---|---|
| 1. | "Honey Trap" (music video) | 3:40 |
| 2. | "Love Player" (music video) | 3:56 |
| 3. | "Nothing Left to Say" (music video) | 4:05 |
| 4. | "Butterflies in My Stomach" (music video) | 3:30 |
| 5. | "Take Immediate Action" (music video) | 3:29 |
| 6. | "Real Hurt" (music video) | 4:30 |
| Total length: | | 23:10 |

Myself – Take 2 – Dance with Me edition (DVD 2)
| No. | Title | Length |
|---|---|---|
| 1. | "Myself Behind-the-Scenes Documentary" | 39:30 |
| Total length: | | 39:30 |

== Release history ==
| Region | Date | Format(s) | Edition(s) | Distributor |
|---|---|---|---|---|
| Various | August 13, 2010 | Streaming; digital download | Standard | Mars |
| Various | October 29, 2010 | Streaming; digital download | Take 2 – Dance with Me | Mars |
| China | August 13, 2010 | Streaming | Standard | YDX |
| China | August 13, 2010 | CD | Standard; pre-order | Starsing |
| China | October 29, 2010 | 2CD+2DVD | Take 2 – Dance with Me | Starsing |
| Malaysia | August 13, 2010 | CD | Standard | Warner |
| Malaysia | June 21, 2011 | 3CD+3DVD | Tour | Warner |
| Taiwan | August 13, 2010 | CD | Standard; pre-order | Warner |
| Taiwan | October 29, 2010 | 2CD+2DVD | Take 2 – Dance with Me | Warner |
| Taiwan | December 28, 2010 | CD+LP | Limited | Warner |
