= Love & Live (album) =

2009 live video album by Jolin Tsai

Live album by Jolin Tsai
- Released: October 9, 2009
- Recorded: May 9 & 24, 2009
- Venue: Taichung Citizen Square (Taichung, Taiwan); Riverside Music Cafe (Taipei, Taiwan)
- Genre: Pop
- Length: 2:00:53
- Label: Warner; Mars

Jolin Tsai chronology
Butterfly (2009)	Love & Live (2009)	Myself (2010)

Love & Live (Chinese: 單身情歌·萬人舞台) is a live video album by Taiwanese singer Jolin Tsai, released on October 9, 2009, by Warner. The album features live performances from two concerts held in Taiwan: the Butterfly Concert on May 9, 2009, in Taichung, and the Slow Life Concert on May 24, 2009, in Taipei. The album reached number six on the 2009's annual video album sales chart by Five Music in Taiwan.

== Commercial performance ==
The album reached the number one spot on the weekly video album sales charts in Taiwan, including those of G-Music and Five Music. It also ranked ninth and sixth on the 2009 annual video album sales charts of G-Music and Five Music, respectively. In addition, it secured number ten on Five Music's 2010 annual video album sales chart in Taiwan.

== Track listing ==
Love & Live – CD
No.	Title	Lyrics	Music	Length
1.	"I Like It" (我喜歡)	Tom Pan	Tom Pan	5:21
2.	"Fear" (害怕)	Deep White	Deep White	4:17
3.	"Prejudice" (偏見)	Sunny Lee	Real Huang	3:55
4.	"Hate That I Love You" (我恨我愛你)	Cheng Shu-fei	David Tan	4:44
5.	"Long Time No See" (好久不見)	Shih Li	Salsa Chen	4:31
6.	"I Know You're Feeling Blue" (我知道你很難過)	Kiki Hu	Jimmy Ye	4:19
Total length:				27:07

Love & Live – DVD 1
No.	Title	Lyrics	Music	Length
1.	"Butterfly"	Matthew Yen	Anders Kjer; David Clewett; Alice Gernandt	3:45
2.	"Hot Winter"	Howard Chiang; Jimmy Chou; Gino Chen	Mikkel Sigvardt; Thomas Troelsen	4:41
3.	"You Hurt My Feelings"	Albert Leung	Tan Vui Chuan	4:11
4.	"Accompany with Me"	Daryl Yao	Yi Jet Qi	3:54
5.	"Love Attraction"	Sunny Lee	Michel Daudin; Matthieu Chedid	2:34
6.	"The Shadow Dancer"	Issac Chen	Christian Lindberg; Ivar Lisinski; Billy Mann	3:52
7.	"Real Man"	Issac Chen	Jonas Jeberg; Mikkel Sigvardt; Mich Hansen; Nina Woodford	3:41
8.	"Compromise"	Howard Chiang	Real Huang; Real Band	4:14
9.	"Parachute"	Zyan Chen	Zyan Chen	7:52
10.	"Slow Life"	Issac Chen	Thomas Eriksson	3:34
Total length:				42:18

Love & Live – DVD 2
No.	Title	Lyrics	Music	Length
1.	"Slow Life"	Issac Chen	Thomas Eriksson	6:36
2.	"Parachute"	Zyan Chen	Zyan Chen	4:36
3.	"I Like It"	Tom Pan	Tom Pan	5:21
4.	"Fear"	Deep White	Deep White	4:17
5.	"You Hurt My Feelings"	Albert Leung	Tan Vui Chuan	4:17
6.	"Prejudice"	Sunny Lee	Real Huang	3:55
7.	"Hate That I Love You"	Cheng Shu-fei	David Tan	4:44
8.	"Long Time No See"	Shih Li	Salsa Chen	4:31
9.	"I Know You're Feeling Blue"	Kiki Hu	Jimmy Ye	4:19
10.	"Accompany with Me"	Daryl Yao	Yi Jet Qi	4:17
11.	"Compromise"	Howard Chiang	Real Huang; Real Band	4:35
Total length:				51:28

== Release history ==
Region	Date	Format(s)	Distributor
Various	October 9, 2009	Streaming	Mars
China	October 9, 2009	CD+2DVD	Sky
Taiwan	October 9, 2009	CD+2DVD	Warner
