= Honey Trap (song) =

- Promotional CD cover

Single by Jolin Tsai

from the album Myself
- Language: Mandarin
- Released: July 14, 2010
- Studio: Mega Force (New Taipei)
- Genre: Electropop; dance-pop
- Length: 3:34
- Label: Warner; Mars
- Composers: Danielle Senior; Scott Wild
- Lyricists: Luke Tsui; Gino Chen
- Producer: Andrew Chen

Jolin Tsai singles chronology
"Real Man" (2009)	"Honey Trap" (2010)	"The Great Artist" (2012)

Music video
- "Honey Trap" on YouTube

"Honey Trap" (Chinese: 美人計; pinyin: Měirén jì) is a song by Taiwanese singer Jolin Tsai, featured on her eleventh studio album, Myself (2010). It features lyrics by Luke Tsui and Gino Chen, music by Danielle Senior and Scott Wild, and production by Andrew Chen. It was released on July 14, 2010, by Warner as the lead single from Myself. Its music video earned a nomination for Best Music Video at the 22nd Golden Melody Awards.

== Background ==
On March 16, 2010, media outlets reported that Tsai's new album was scheduled for release in July of the same year. Warner Music Taiwan's general manager Sam Chen revealed that the album would feature multiple international collaborations and involved an investment exceeding NT$50 million.

== Composition ==
"Honey Trap"
"Honey Trap" is a house track with lyrics revolving around seduction.

"Honey Trap" is a bass-driven house dance track characterized by rich synthesizer textures and provocative lyrics. Tsai delivers a sultry, low-toned vocal performance, blending spoken word and melodic phrasing to evoke a seductive and confident aura.

== Music video ==
On July 27, 2010, Tsai released the music video for "Honey Trap", directed by Cha Eun-taek, with a production budget of NT$10 million. In the video, Tsai performs voguing—a dance style she was inspired to incorporate upon first hearing the demo. She enlisted the help of Taiwanese choreographer Bruce Chang to find a suitable choreographer, ultimately training with a coach from the American reality show America's Next Top Model. The coach introduced voguing as a dance style that originated in prison, where inmates mimicked poses from fashion magazines in dance battles. Tsai was taught the signature movements and deeper meaning of the style, which emphasizes confidence, attitude, and personal expression.

== Other edition ==
On October 20, 2010, Tsai released the "Dance with Me Remix" edition of "Honey Trap". The single also included the "Cheerleading Remix" of her song "Macho Babe". The "Honey Trap" remix was produced by DJ George Leong, while the remix of "Macho Babe" was crafted by DJ Oscar.

== Commercial performance ==
The song was ranked number one on Taiwan's Hit FM Top 100 Singles chart for 2010.

== Critical reception ==
NetEase Entertainment noted that its style is less tailored to mainstream tastes, which reduces its sing-along appeal but enhances the overall cohesiveness of the album. Music critic Lin Ju Li observed that "Honey Trap" showcases the team's international ambitions; although it features the common bass-driven house beats, Tsai's sensual, deep vocal tone and provocative lyrics mark a clear stylistic transformation.

Music critic Liang Xiaohui praised "Honey Trap" for its strong arrangement, highlighting the rich and well-balanced synthesizer sounds complemented by various effects. The track avoids both clutter and monotony, demonstrating the skill of arranger Andrew Chen. Tsai's multi-layered vocals overcome her previous vocal fragility, delivering a performance that is both sexy and controlled, blending the complexity and sophistication of Western, Japanese, and Korean dance music.

Music critic Liu Shui Ji noted that the track, created through collaboration with British and American musicians, fuses electronic music with powerful rap. The synthesizer tones are dense and multi-layered, making the listening experience lively without causing fatigue. However, Tsai's rap lacks an international flair; her vocal delivery sounds thin, and her attempt at a tough style feels somewhat forced.

Tencent Music's critic Lao You commended Andrew Chen's breakthrough in arrangement, pointing out that while the melody of "Honey Trap" is ordinary, the arrangement is rhythmically rich and layered. The use of sound effects is abundant and blends well with Tsai's voice, resulting in a cohesive song. Notably, the extended instrumental solo maintains a continuous flow and pairs especially well with the music video. Bradley Stern from MuuMuse compared the production of "Honey Trap" to that of "Bad Romance" by Lady Gaga, calling it "pure, pumping electronic goodness".

== Accolades ==
On December 21, 2010, the music video for "Honey Trap" was awarded the Best Music Video at the BQ Top Winner Awards. On March 26, 2011, "Honey Trap" received the Top Dance Song and Top 20 Songs awards at the 2nd My Astro Music Awards. On April 9, 2011, "Honey Trap" was honored as the Hit FM Top 100 Number One Song and included in the Top 20 Songs at the 1st Global Chinese Golden Chart Awards. On April 24, 2011, it won the Top Played Radio Song and was named one of the Top Hong Kong/Taiwan Songs at the 2011 Music Radio China Top Chart Awards. On May 13, 2011, its music video was nominated for the Best Music Video at the 22nd Golden Melody Awards.

== Live performances ==
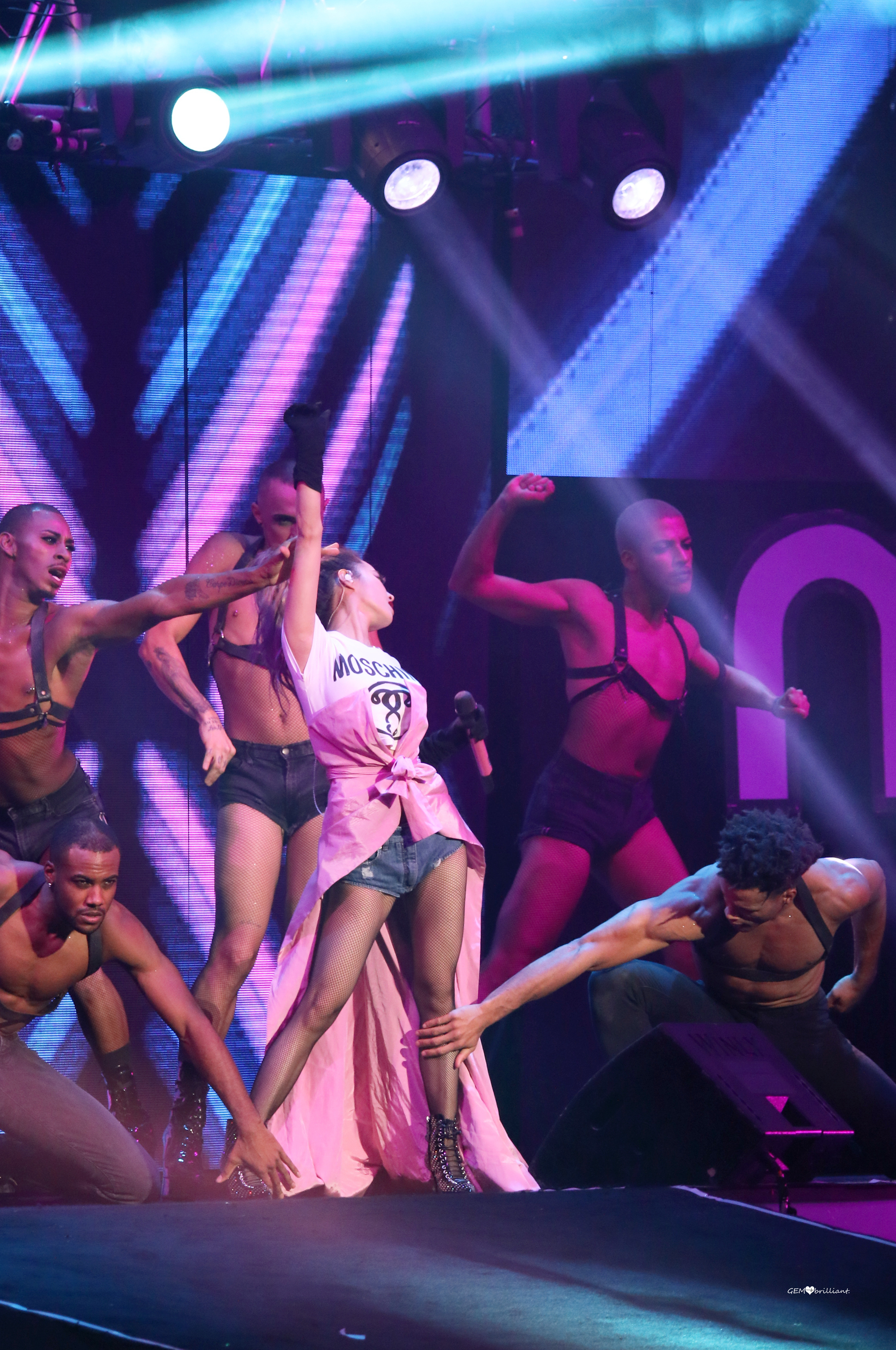
Tsai performing "Honey Trap" at the 10th Migu Music Awards, December 2016

On July 31, 2010, Tsai appeared on the Taiwanese variety show Super King and performed her song "Honey Trap". On August 12, 2010, she appeared on another Taiwanese variety show, Power Sunday, where she again performed "Honey Trap". On August 27, 2010, Tsai participated in the Chinese variety show One Million Star, performing "Honey Trap". On September 2, 2010, Tsai appeared on Zhejiang TV's Singing & Dancing, where she performed "Honey Trap". On September 4, 2010, she performed "Honey Trap" on We Are Family.

On September 22, 2010, she performed "Honey Trap" at the 2010 CCTV Mid-Autumn Festival Gala. The same day, she appeared on Jiangsu TV's Happy!, performing "Honey Trap". On September 24, 2010, Tsai appeared on Hunan TV's Day Day Up, performing "Honey Trap". On December 31, 2010, Tsai performed "Honey Trap" at the New Year's Eve Concert in Kaohsiung.That same evening, she also performed "Honey Trap" at another New Year's Eve Concert in Kaohsiung.

On April 9, 2011, she took part in the 1st Global Chinese Golden Chart Awards, where she performed "Honey Trap". On April 24, 2011, she appeared at the 2011 Music Radio China Top Chart Awards and performed the same song.

== Track listing ==
- Promotional CD
1. "Honey Trap" – 3:34
- Promotional CD – Dance with Me remix
1. "Honey Trap" (Dance with Me remix) – 6:36
2. "Macho Babe" (Cheerleading remix) – 4:27

== Credits and personnel ==
=== Recording ===
- Recorded and mixed at Mega Force Studio, New Taipei City

=== Personnel ===
- Andrew Chen – vocal arrangement, backing vocals
- Jolin Tsai – vocals, backing vocals
- The White N3rd – backing vocals
- Jansen Chen – recording engineering
- Keller Wang – mixing engineering

== Release history ==
Release dates and formats for "Honey Trap"
Region	Date	Format(s)	Version	Distributor
Taiwan	July 14, 2010	Radio airplay	Original	Warner
Taiwan	October 20, 2010	Radio airplay	Dance with Me remix	Warner
