= S.N.G (album) =

- S.N.G album cover

Studio album by Nick Chou
- Released: May 30, 2012
- Genres: C-pop, R&B, Dance
- Length: 43:27
- Language: Mandarin
- Label: Gold Typhoon

Nick Chou chronology
Nick Chou (2010)	S.N.G (2012)

Music video
- "One Out Of A Million" Video on YouTube "S.N.G" on YouTube "This is Your Song" on YouTube "Internal Injury" on YouTube "Maji Maji" on YouTube

S.N.G is Taiwanese singer Nick Chou's second album released on May 30, 2012 by Gold Typhoon.

The album marks Chou's first album release after nearly two years since his Nick Chou album in 2010. He also switched his label from Warner Music Taiwan to Gold Typhoon.

Some of his songs, which includes "Heartache", "One Out Of A Million", and his title track, "S.N.G" were included in the official soundtrack of his first television series, I Love You so Much, released on April 17, 2012.

== Production ==
All the tracks are written by Chou as he dreams to be a singer-songwriter in the future. He personally takes on the composing, arranging, and producing works of the entire album, which he spent a year writing. The songs on his album were picked by his manager out of 200 songs that he wrote.

His title track, S.N.G stands for "Super Nice Girl". It is an R&B song about a search for a girlfriend. In ironic, however, Chou has no plans to look for relationships in the moment, and just be with his mother, Billie.

In addition, his other song "Heartache" (內傷), which was also featured in I Love You so Much, was coincidentally written after his break up with his former girlfriend, Elva Hsiao in October 2010. However, Chou explained that he do not write songs about relationships, but about life only.

Other songs include "This is Your Song", a soothing song that demonstrates Nick's vocal style, the David Ke-penned "Internal Injury", and Maji Maji which is dedicated to Nick's mother.

== Promotion ==
The album had preorder sales on May 15, prior to its release. Later on, his record company organized a concert for him at Legacy venue on June 16 since the album had already sold fifteen thousand copies in preorder sales even before its release. In addition, Chou held a mini-concert the night before the release of the album to showcase some of his new songs.

== Track listing ==
No.	Title	Lyrics	Music	Length
1.	"Control" (控)	Nick Chou	Nick Chou	4:08
2.	"Black Hole" (黑洞)	Xú Shì Zhēn (徐世珍), Wú Huī Fú (吳輝福)	Nick Chou	4:27
3.	"S.N.G R&B version" (R&B抒情版)	Nick Chou, Chin Ten'Yū (陳天佑)	Nick Chou	4:10
4.	"One Out Of A Million" (億萬分之一的機率)	Wú Yì Wěi (吳易緯), Nick Chou（RAP）	Nick Chou	3:38
5.	"Maji Maji" (麻吉麻吉)	Li Zōng'ēn (李宗恩), Nick Chou（RAP）	Nick Chou	4:14
6.	"I Just Want To" (我就是要)	Gé Dà Wéi (葛大為)	Nick Chou	3:39
7.	"Internal Injury" (內傷)	Gé Dà Wéi (葛大為), Nick Chou（RAP）	Nick Chou	4:00
8.	"寂寞的時候" (附加編曲：Nick The Real)	Nick The Real	Nick Chou	4:17
9.	"This Is Your Song" (這是你的歌)	Yán Yún Nóng (嚴云農)	Nick Chou	3:11
10.	"Super Nice Girl" (舞曲版)	Nick Chou, Chin Ten'Yū (陳天佑)	Nick Chou	3:58
11.	"全面失控"	Chin Ten'Yū (陳天佑)	Nick Chou	3:45
Total length:				43:27

== Music videos ==
- "One Out Of A Million"
- "S.N.G"
- "這是你的歌" (This Is Your Song)
- "內傷" (Internal Injury)
- "麻吉麻吉" (Maji Maji)

== Charts ==
=== Taiwan ===
Year	Song title	幽浮	Hito	MTV	Channel V
2012	One Out Of A Million	15	5	-	12
2012	Super Nice Girl	-	6	-	-
2012	S.N.G	4	3	-	6
2012	This is Your Song	-	1	7	1
2012	Internal Injury	2	2	-	3
2012	Black Hole	5	-	-	-
2012	Maji Maji	15	4	-	-

=== Hong Kong ===
Year	Song title	903	TVB	997	RTHK
2012	One Out of a Million	-	-	4（國語力）	-
2012	S.N.G	-	-	-	-
2012	Internal Injury	-	-	3（國語力）	-
2012	This Is Your Song	-	-	-	-

=== Singapore ===
Year	Song title	YES933	Radio1003
2012	This Is Your Song	13	-

=== Malaysia ===
Year	Song title	988
2012	S.N.G	18

== Release history ==
Country	Date	Distributing label	Format
Taiwan	May 15, 2012	Gold Typhoon	CD
Taiwan	May 30, 2012	Gold Typhoon	Regular CD
Taiwan	June 29, 2012	Gold Typhoon	Nickthereal version (CD + photo album)
