= Flight Tribe =

- Flight Tribe cover

Studio album by F.I.R.
- Released: 28 July 2006
- Recorded: 2005–2006
- Genre: Mandopop
- Length: 46:53
- Label: Warner Music Taiwan
- Producer: Ian Chen (陳建寧)

F.I.R. chronology
Unlimited (2005)	Flight Tribe (2006)	Love, Diva (2007)

Flight Tribe (Chinese: 飛行部落) is Taiwanese Mandopop band F.I.R.'s third Mandarin studio album. It was released on 28 July 2006 by Warner Music Taiwan. It features a collaboration with the American country music singer and Grammy Award winner, LeAnn Rimes. The fourth track "天天夜夜" (Every Day And Night), is a cover version of "How Do I Live", with Rimes singing in the opening and bridge of the track.

The track "飛行部落" (Flight Tribe) was nominated for Top 10 Gold Songs at the Hong Kong TVB8 Awards, presented by television station TVB8, in 2006.

== Album ==
- According to track 13 "What's Next?" from Unlimited, the main origin of this album should be Jazz in American style.
- The melody of the track "待續" (To be Continued...) from F.I.R.-Fairyland in Reality became the introductory melody of track "無限" (Unlimited) from Unlimited. But this album did not use the melody of "What's next?" from Unlimited.
- The song that "What's next?" announced is the song of track 8 "1234567".
- The piano version of "Every Day And Night (天天夜夜)" is at hidden track of Track 11.

== Track listing ==
1. "Intro" - 1'26"
2. "Get High" - 3'47"
3. "雨櫻花" (Rain Cherry Blossom) - 4'39"
4. "天天夜夜" (Every Day And Night/ How Do I Live) (sampling & featuring LeAnn Rimes) - 4'53"
5. "飛行部落" (Flight Tribe) - 4'28"
6. "北極圈" (Arctic Circle) - 4'34"
7. "你很愛他" (You Really Love Him) - 4'47"
8. "1234567" - 3'35"
9. "眷戀" (Attachment) - 4'10"
10. "I Don't Care" - 4'03"
11. "我最愛的人" (The Person I Love Most) - 4'20"
12. (Hidden Track, at Track 11) - (7'25", Hidden track included)

== Chart ==
Release	Chart	Peak position
July 28, 2006	G-music Top 20	1
July 28, 2006	Hito board Top 10	1
