= Nick Chou =

Taiwanese singer and actor

- 周湯豪
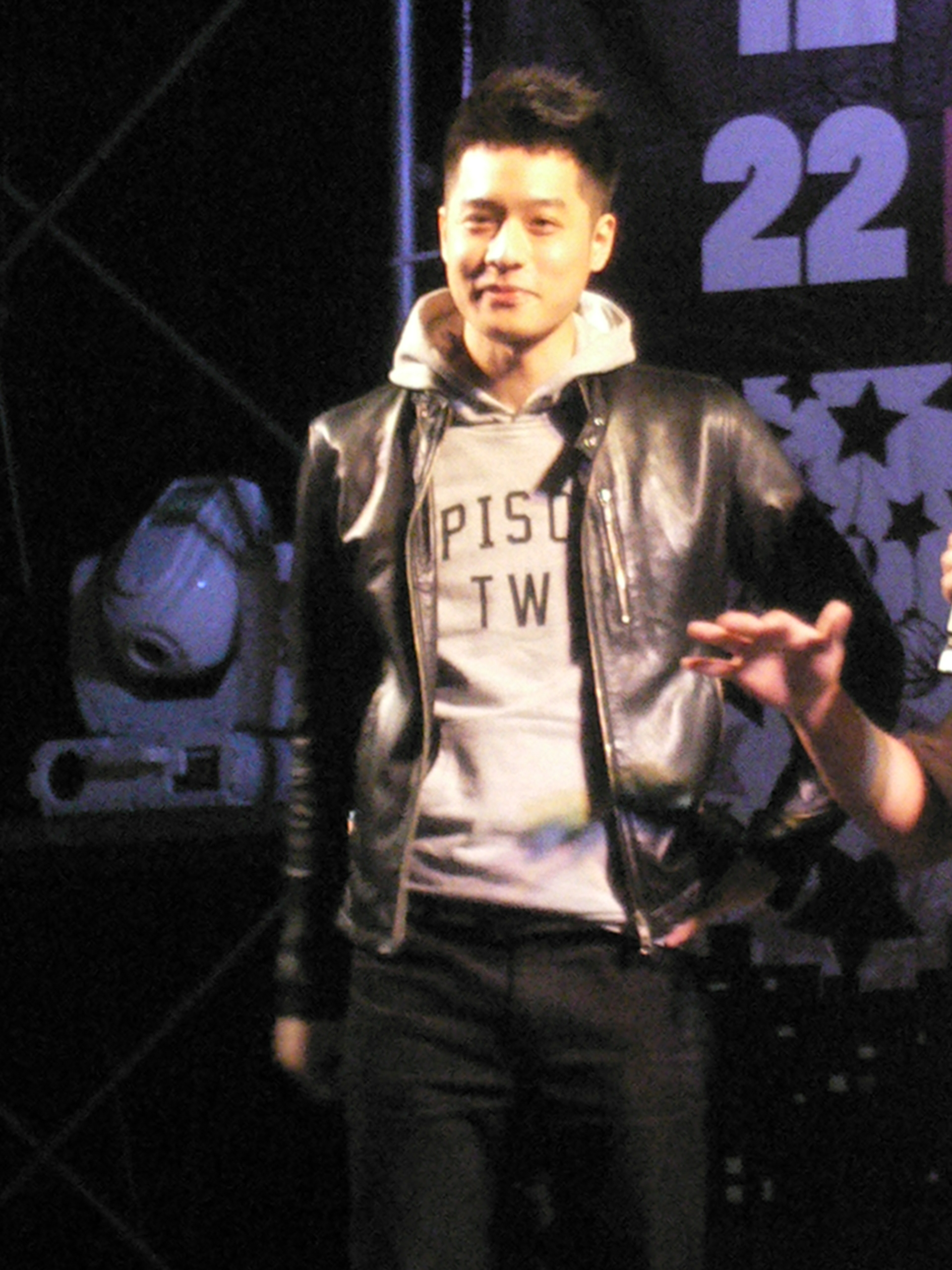
- Chou at the Southern Taiwan University of Technology "Nice Team Night" concert, 2010
- Born: August 2, 1988 (age 38); Taipei, Taiwan
- Occupations: Singer; actor; rapper; dancer
- Years active: 2008–present
- Parent: Billie Wang (mother)
- Musical career
- Also known as: Nickthereal, Zhou Tanghao
- Origin: Taiwan
- Genre: Mandopop
- Instruments: Vocals; guitar
- Labels: Warner; Gold Typhoon; Sun; Universal

Chinese name
- Traditional Chinese: 周湯豪
- Simplified Chinese: 周汤豪
Transcriptions
Standard Mandarin
- Hanyu Pinyin: Zhōu Tāngháo
Southern Min
- Hokkien POJ: Chiu Thong-hô

Nick Chou (Chinese: 周湯豪; pinyin: Zhōu Tāngháo; Pe̍h-ōe-jī: Chiu Thong-hô; born August 2, 1988) is a Taiwanese singer, rapper and actor.

In 2010, Chou released his self-titled debut album. He then released his second album, S.N.G, in 2012, as well as appeared in his first drama series, I Love You So Much, as one of the male leads.

== Life and career ==
=== Early life ===
Chou's family consists of his parents and himself. His mother, whose name is Billie (比莉), starred in several dramas including They Kiss Again, Love Buffet, and The Rose, while his father, Chou Yuhou, worked with Vivian Hsu in Angel Heart.

Chou was born in Taipei, Taiwan on August 2, 1988. At the age of fifteen, he went to the United States to pursue his studies. He speaks English, Taiwanese Hokkien, and Mandarin Chinese fluently.

=== Pre-debut ===
When he was eight years old, Chou stood on the same stage with Michael Jackson on one of his concert tours held in 1996. At the age of fourteen, he sang the rap part and was featured on his mother's song, 「誰是白癡」 (Who is an idiot). At fifteen, he went to study in America and was spotted by an SM Entertainment representative. After hearing the news, his mother flew to America to accompany him in meeting with the company. At that time, he was almost recruited as one of the members to form Super Junior. However, since the contract terms included a 10-year-long deal, both he and his mother decided to decline the proposal. Later on, when asked if he had regretted passing up the opportunity, he said:

Not really…because if I had decided to sign the contract back then, I would’ve ended my studies to go train in Korea. It was probably since I didn't go that I was able to finish my studies and also learn many things in the musical aspect. I really don't regret it! At least now, I have another chance to enter the entertainment circle and create the music I love!

=== 2008–2010: Debut ===
In 2009, Chou was featured in Jolin Tsai's music video, "Real Man", which gained him attention from the media. To prove his popularity, Warner Music set a condition that for him to release an album, he should attract at least 3000 fans to attend his debut concert. He won the chance to release an album after attracting 3085 fans to his concert held on July 10, 2010.

He finally released his debut album, Nick Chou (周湯豪), on July 16, 2010, under Warner Music Taiwan. The songs include "Chinese Heart (附心漢)", "Mad Love (愛瘋)", "Wake Up", and "Scolded Me Awake (罵醒我)". Chou also participated in the making of the album. In particular, he penned "Chinese Heart (附心漢)", and composed and arranged the songs "Wake Up", "Love Left (情剩)", and "翻頁作廢".

=== 2011–present: S.N.G and I Love You So Much series ===
In 2012, Chou starred in CTS' drama series I Love You So Much as one of the main leads, Chang Shao Feng. The drama, which premiered on January 29, included Lan Cheng Long, Lee Chia-Ying, and Qiu Mao Di. Aside from acting in the drama, he also sang the ending song of the series entitled "Yi Wan Fen Zhi Yi De Ji Lu (億萬分之一的機率)".

Almost two years after the release of his debut album, Chou released his second album, S.N.G on May 30, 2012, under Gold Typhoon. Once again, Chou who planned to be a singer-songwriter, participated in the making of the album. He personally took on the composing, arranging and producing works of the entire album, which he spent a year writing. His record company organized a concert for him at Legacy venue on June 16 since the album had already sold 15000 copies in pre-order sales even before its release. In addition, Chou held a mini-concert the night before the album release to showcase some of his new songs. His title song, "S.N.G", which stands for "Super Nice Girl", was an R&B song about the search for a girlfriend. Other songs included "This is Your Song", a soothing song demonstrating Chou's vocal style, the David Ke-penned "Internal Injury" and Maji Maji which is dedicated to Chou's mother.

== Discography ==
=== Studio albums ===
Year	Information	Track listing
2010	Nick Chou: Chinese: 周湯豪; Pinyin: Chou Tang Hao; Release Date: July 16, 2010; Label: Warner Music Taiwan; Language: Mandarin	Track listing: 1. "附心漢 (Chinese Heart)"; 2. "周湯豪 (Nick Chou)"; 3. "Miss壞 (Miss Bad)"; 4. "罵醒我 (Scolded Me Awake)"; 5. "愛瘋 (Mad Love)"; 6. "使命必達"; 7. "Wake Up"; 8. "最後通牒 (Ultimatum)"; 9. "連線 (Connection)"; 10. "情剩 (Love Left)"; 11. "翻頁作廢"
2012	S.N.G: Release Date: May 30, 2012; Label: Gold Typhoon; Language: Mandarin	Track listing: 1. "控 (Control)"; 2. "黑洞 (Black Hole)"; 3. "S.N.G (R&B version)" 4. "億萬分之一的機率"; 5. "麻吉麻吉 (Maji Maji)"; 6. "我就是要 (I Just Want To)"; 7. "內傷 (Internal Injury)"; 8. "寂寞的時候 (Lonely)"; 9. "這是你的歌 (This Is Your Song)"; 10. "Super Nice Girl (dance version)" 11. "全面失控"
2016	Real: Release Date: October 15, 2016; Label: Sun Entertainment Culture Limited; Language: Mandarin	Track listing: 1. "妳是我的菜”; 2. "Be Mine"; 3. "I Say BABY"; 4. "My Boo"; 5. "需要你的美”; 6. "帥到分手"; 7. "角頭"; 8. "Turn Up"; 9. "Get On My Level"; 10. "Can't Hold Us Back ft. Bassjackers"; 11. "Sorry Not Sorry"; 12. "妳是我的菜 (remix)" 13. "角頭 (remix)"

=== Soundtrack appearances ===
Year	Song	OST	Network
2012	"億萬分之一的機率" (Yi Wan Fen Zhi Yi De Ji Lu)	I Love You So Much	CTS

== Filmography ==
=== Film ===
Year	Title	Role	Notes
1991	Da Xiao Lao Qian	Zai Zai	
2014	Full of Love	Nick	Short film

=== Television series ===
Year	Network	Title	Role	Notes
2012	CTS	I Love You So Much	Chang Shao Feng	
2013	FTV	First Kiss	Cheng Qian	
2014	Dragon TV	One and a Half Summer	Tang Bo Wen	Cameo
2017	EBC	Love, Timeless	Shi Zhao Yu	

=== Variety show ===
Year	English title	Original title	Notes
2018	The Rap of China	中国新说唱	Contestant

=== Music video appearances ===
Year	Song title	Singer(s)	Album
2002	"Who Is An Idiot (誰是白癡)"	Billie	滑步向左
2009	"Real Man (大丈夫)"	Jolin Tsai	Butterfly
2010	"A Flower Among Thorns (荊棘裡的花)"	F.I.R.	Let's Smile
2013	"Can (能不能)"	Coco Lee	Illuminate

== Tours ==
=== Nickthereal Party Tour ===
Date	Location	Venue	Guests	Attendance
September 2, 2017	Taipei, Taiwan	A Station	—N/a	3,200
November 11, 2017	Beijing, China	Beijing M Space	—N/a	—N/a
November 24, 2017	Shanghai, China	Bandai Namco Shanghai Base	—N/a	—N/a
December 2, 2017	Kuala Lumpur, Malaysia	KL Live Life Centre	—N/a	3,400
December 3, 2017	Singapore	Shanghai Dolly	—N/a	—N/a
December 9, 2017	Chengdu, China	成都梵木創藝區正火藝術中心1號館	—N/a	—N/a
April 28, 2018	Guangzhou, China	Guangzhou Central Station Rockhouse	—N/a	—N/a
May 4, 2018	San Francisco, United States	The Regency Ballroom	—N/a	—N/a
May 6, 2018	Los Angeles, United States	Mayan Theater	—N/a	—N/a

Set List
1. 妳是我的菜
2. 這是你的歌
3. Can't hold us back
4. Get on my level
5. 角頭
6. 需要你的美
7. 帥到分手
8. S.N.G
9. I Say BABY
10. Be Mine
11. Turn up
12. My Boo
13. 不放
14. 你是我的菜
15. Sorry not sorry
16. Circus Monkey （黃立行）
17. 放手（Energy）
18. 射手 （MP魔幻力量）
19. 東區東區 （八三夭）

== Awards and nominations ==
Year	Award	Category	Nominated work	Result	Ref.
2012	2012 Metro Radio Mandarin Hits Music Awards Presentation	Metro Mandarin Idol	—N/a	Won	
2013	Hito Music Awards	Most Promising Singer-Songwriter Gold Award	—N/a	Won	
2016	2016 Sanlih Drama Awards	Viewers Choice Drama Theme Song Award	"Handsome to Break Up"	Won	
2017	Hito Music Awards	Favorite Singer-songwriter	—N/a	Won	
2017	MTV Global Chinese Music Awards Show	Popular Breakthrough Male Artist	—N/a	Won	
2018	2018 KKBOX Music Awards	Top 10 Artists	—N/a	Won	
