= Love, Diva =

Studio album by F.I.R.
- Released: September 28, 2007
- Recorded: 2006~2007
- Genre: Mandopop
- Label: Warner Music
- Producer: Ian Chen (陳建寧)

F.I.R. chronology
Flight Tribe 飛行部落 (2006)	Love, Diva (2007)	Let's Smile (2009)

Love, Diva (Chinese: 愛·歌姬; pinyin: Aì Gējī) is the fourth studio album by F.I.R., released on 28 September 2007. The album features 11 new tracks, with the song 荼靡時代 (Tu Mi Times) being offered as a bonus track. 月牙灣 (Crescent Bay) was the first single off the album and was first aired on Hitoradio. The release of the album also marked the beginning of the trio's first world tour in four years, entitled "The Tenth Planet World Tour" (第十行星巡迴演唱會), which started on 20 October 2007 in Taipei Arena, Taiwan.

== Track listing ==
1. 詠嘆曲 (Aria)
2. 第十行星 (The Tenth Planet)*
3. 需要你的愛 (Need Your Love)*
4. 三個心願 (Three Wishes)*
5. Change
6. 真愛地圖 (Map of True Love)*
7. 月牙灣 (Crescent Bay)*
8. Forever Green
9. Blue Doors Ahead
10. 愛過 (Bygone Love)*
11. 彩色拼圖 (Color Jigsaw)
12. 荼靡時代 (Tu Mi Times)

* music videos have been made for these songs

=== Information on "Love · Diva 愛 · 歌姬" ===
- Track 1 - 詠嘆曲 (Hymn), is the reverse of 應許之地 'The Holy Land' (Track 5 from their second album 無限 'Unlimited').
- Track 2 - 第十行星, is the title track for F.I.R.'s first world tour, called Tenth Planet, starting October 20 at Taiwan.
- Track 8 - Forever Green is a cover of the Zwei song, "Fake Face."
- Track 5 and 9 - "Change" and "Blue Doors Ahead" were Faye's two musical compositions.
- Track 10 - 愛過, is the song in which Faye makes use of the whistle register for the first time, making it a fan favorite and the most difficult song by F.I.R. to date.

== Chart ==
Release	Chart	Peak position
28 September 2007	G-music Top 20	2
28 September 2007	Hito board Top 10	2
