= Faye (Taiwanese singer) =

Taiwanese singer (born 1981)

Faye 詹雯婷
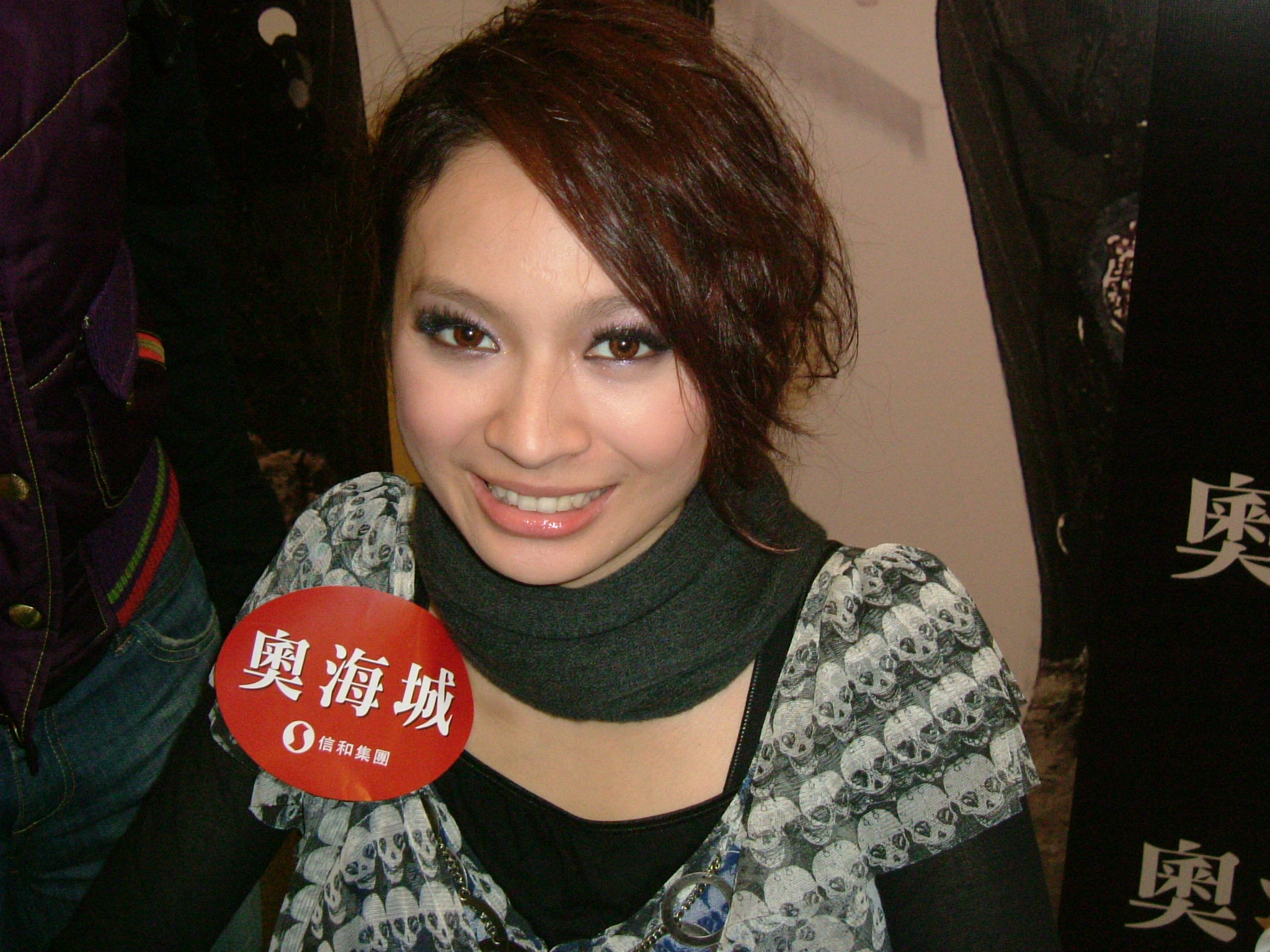
- Faye at Olympian City in 2007

Background information
- Born: Zhan Wen-ting; August 27, 1981 (age 44); Taipei, Taiwan
- Genres: Pop; rock; dance
- Occupation: Singer
- Years active: 2002–present
- Labels: Warner; Feeling Good Music; Asia Muse Entertainment

Chinese name
- Chinese: 詹雯婷
Transcriptions
Standard Mandarin
- Hanyu Pinyin: Zhān wéntíng

Alternative Chinese name
- Chinese: 飛
Transcriptions
Standard Mandarin
- Hanyu Pinyin: Fēi

Zhan Wen-ting (Chinese: 詹雯婷; born August 27, 1981), known professionally as Faye, is a Taiwanese singer. She is the former lead vocalist of pop rock band F.I.R., who won Golden Melody Award for Best New Artist in 2005.

In 2017, Faye made her solo debut with the album Little Outerspace. In 2021, Faye released her second album Zai Yun Cai Shang Tiao Wu Ji Ji Zha Zha.

== Personal life ==
Faye was born in Taipei, Taiwan. Her father was once the general manager of Taisun Enterprise, a Taiwanese food and beverage company.

She attended Taipei Tsai Hsing Private School and graduated from Fu Jen Catholic University in 2003, where she majored in English literature and was a member of indie group "Yu Hun Band".

In 2009, Faye co-founded Lilla Fé, a scented product company that sells cosmetics, skin care and perfume products.

== Discography ==
=== Studio albums ===
Title	Album details	Track listing
Little Outerspace 小太空	Released: July 28, 2017; Label: I Did It; Formats: CD, digital download	Track listing: 1. Cave 洞 2. Riverside 河畔; 3. Ivory Tower 象牙塔; 4. Original Sin 原罪; 5. You Said 你說; 6. Vanity Fair 繁華市集; 7. Fire Dancer; 8. Running 奔跑; 9. Vault of the Sky 蒼穹; 10. The Other Side 另一端
Faye, Wen Ting Zhan Zai Yun Cai Shang Tiao Wu Ji Ji Zha Zha Faye詹雯婷 在雲彩上跳舞 嘰嘰喳喳	Released: December 30, 2021; Label: Asia Muse Entertainment; Formats: CD, digital download	Track listing: 1. 融雪; 2. 焚風; 3. 詠愛; 4. 預言石; 5. #7; 6. Alle; 7. 瘋人院; 8. Tears; 9. 煮沙; 10. 山海盟; 11. aalleeeeeee

=== Singles ===
Year	Title	Notes
2002	"Tattoo" (刺青)	From album Xia Yu and Yu Hun Band (夏宇愈混樂隊)
2002	"A Love Letter" (像一封情書)	From album Xia Yu and Yu Hun Band (夏宇愈混樂隊)
2003	"Wei Da De Shen Ling" (偉大的神靈)	Chinese soundtrack of Disney animation "Brother Bear"
2017	"Yong Wang Zhi Qian" (勇往直前)	
2020	"Dan Yuan Ren Chang Jiu" (但願人長久)	Cover version
2022	"Ren Jian Jing Hong Ke" (人間驚鴻客)	Cover version
2022	"Huang Yu" (荒羽)	Theme song of Game "Justice Online"
2022	"Parting Love" (訣愛)	Opening theme song of TV series Love Between Fairy and Devil
2023	"Yu Guang" (馭光)	Theme song of Game Ragnarok Origin
2023	"Ni Dao" (逆道)	Opening song of Animation "Rakshasa Street Season 3"
2023	"The Flame of Fate" (命運火焰)	Theme song of Game Naraka: Bladepoint X NieR Series
2023	"Only Love" (唯愛)	Opening theme song of TV series Love You Seven Times
2023	"Friendship Years" (友情歲月)(feat. Wang Xu, Wang Yi Tai)	Theme song of Movie "The Ex-File 4: Early Marriage"
2023	"Huang Ye Zhi" (荒野志)	Opening song of TV series "Tiger and Crane"
2024	"Yi Zhi Zhe Yang Hao Ma" (一直這樣好嗎)	Theme song of Movie "Hourglass"
2024	"Yi Shi Cong Ming" (一世聰明)	OST of TV series The Double
2024	"Xuan Ji" (玄機)	Theme song of Game Justice Online
2024	"Grazing Love" (掠日)	Theme song of TV series A Perfect Blossom
2024	"Immortal Starry Sky" (不朽的星空)	Promotional song of "Swallowed Star The Movie: Blood Luo Continent"

== Filmography ==
=== Television series ===
Year	English title	Original title	Role	Notes	Ref.
2007	The Teen Age	18禁不禁？	Ms. An	Cameo	

== Theater ==
Year	English title	Original title
2010	One More Day with You	走向春天的下午

== Awards and nominations ==
Year	Award	Category	Nominated work	Result	Ref.
2005	16th Golden Melody Awards	Best New Artist – Mandarin	F.I.R	Won	
2018	29th Golden Melody Awards	Best Female Vocalist – Mandarin	Little Outerspace	Nominated	
2018	Music Radio China Top Chart	Best New Artist	Little Outerspace	Nominated	
2021	18th Hito Music Awards	Hit FM Hundredth Songs of the Year	"Yong Ai"	Won	
2022	19th Hito Music Awards	Hito Female Singer-songwriter	Zai Yun Cai Shang Tiao Wu Ji Ji Zha Zha	Won	
2022	19th Hito Music Awards	Hit FM Hundredth Songs of the Year	"Parting Love"	Won	
2022	15th Freshmusic Awards	Best 10 albums of the year	Zai Yun Cai Shang Tiao Wu Ji Ji Zha Zha	Won	
2022	33rd Golden Melody Awards	Best Female Vocalist – Mandarin	Zai Yun Cai Shang Tiao Wu Ji Ji Zha Zha	Nominated	
2022	33rd Golden Melody Awards	Album of the Year	Zai Yun Cai Shang Tiao Wu Ji Ji Zha Zha	Nominated	
2022	33rd Golden Melody Awards	Best Mandarin Album	Zai Yun Cai Shang Tiao Wu Ji Ji Zha Zha	Nominated	
2022	33rd Golden Melody Awards	Producer of the Year, Single	"Rong Xue"	Nominated	
2022	Asian Pop Music Awards	Best OST, Chinese	"Parting Love"	Nominated	
2022	Asian Pop Music Awards	Top 20 Songs of the Year, Chinese	"Parting Love"	Won	
2022	QQ Music Chart	Top 10 Songs of the Year	"Parting Love"	Won	
2023	8th Lavender Music Awards	Top 10 Albums of the Year	Zai Yun Cai Shang Tiao Wu Ji Ji Zha Zha	Won	
2023	8th Lavender Music Awards	Top 10 Songs of the Year	"Fen Feng"	Won	
2023	18th KKBOX Music Awards	Top 100 Singers of the Year	—N/a	Won	
2023	Tencent Music Chart	Women of the Year	—N/a	Won	
2023	Wave Music Awards	Best Soundtrack	"Parting Love"	Nominated	
2023	4th Tencent Music Entertainment Awards	Best Soundtrack of the Year	"Parting Love"	Won	
2023	4th Tencent Music Entertainment Awards	Top 10 Songs of the Year	"Parting Love"	Won	
2023	4th Tencent Music Entertainment Awards	Best Stage Performance of the Year	—N/a	Won	
2023	Asian Pop Music Awards	Best OST, Chinese	"Only Love"	Nominated	
2023	Asian Pop Music Awards	Top 20 Songs of the Year, Chinese	"Only Love"	Won	
2024	19th KKBOX Music Awards	Top 100 Singers of the Year	—N/a	Won	
2024	Original Soundtrack Music Awards	10 most unforgettable TV series songs	"Parting Love"	Won	
