= Real Man (Jolin Tsai song) =

Single by Jolin Tsai and Nick Chou

from the album Butterfly
- Language: Mandarin
- Released: March 9, 2009
- Studio: Mega Force (New Taipei)
- Genre: Pop
- Length: 3:19
- Label: Warner; Mars
- Composers: Jonas Jeberg; Mikkel Sigvardt; Mich Hansen; Nina Woodford
- Lyricist: Issac Chen
- Producer: Adia

Jolin Tsai singles chronology
"In My Arms" (2007)	"Real Man" (2009)	"Honey Trap" (2010)

Nick Chou singles chronology
"Real Man" (2009)	"Devoted Man" (2010)

Music video
- "Real Man" on YouTube

"Real Man" (Chinese: 大丈夫; pinyin: Dà zhàngfū) is a song by Taiwanese singer Jolin Tsai featuring Nick Chou. It was included on Tsai's tenth studio album, Butterfly (2009). The track is an adaptation of the song of the same name by Lexington Bridge, originally written by Jonas Jeberg, Mikkel Sigvardt, Mich Hansen, and Nina Woodford. The Chinese lyrics were written by Issac Chen, with production by Adia. The song was released as a single on March 9, 2009, by Warner.

== Background and development ==
On July 4, 2008, Tsai's manager, Howard Chiang, revealed that she would begin recording her new album in August. On October 14, 2008, reports indicated that she would sign with Warner in December and had traveled to New York in late September to study new dance styles. Her manager confirmed that the recording process was being expedited with the aim of releasing new material by the end of the year. On November 23, 2008, media outlets reported that the new album was scheduled for release around the Chinese New Year of 2009.

Tsai officially signed with Warner on December 16, 2008, announcing that recording was complete and that she would begin filming music videos. The album was said to feature ten tracks, primarily dance-oriented. On January 29, 2009, reports suggested that the album would be released by late March, and on February 27, 2009, it was revealed that Tsai would collaborate with newcomer Nick Chou on a duet.

== Composition ==
"Real Man" adapts Lexington Bridge's track of the same name and is performed as a duet with Nick Chou. Musically, it blends dance-pop and hip-hop elements, while lyrically expressing a modern woman's expectations of an ideal partner.

== Music video ==
The music video for "Real Man" premiered on March 8, 2009, during a launch event in Beijing that reportedly cost NT$850,000. Directed by Marlboro Lai and choreographed by Jonte' Moaning, the video features sharp dance sequences and an urban visual aesthetic.

== Commercial performance ==
The song reached number 25 on Taiwan's Hit FM Top 100 Singles of 2009 chart.

== Critical reception ==
NetEase Entertainment described "Real Man" as a standout adaptation distinguished by its rap sections, which were considered stronger than those in the original version. The review also noted the track's smooth and accessible sound. Smart Info praised the song's powerful opening, comparing it to a musical version of Sex and the City, and highlighted its lyrical exploration of the search for a "perfect man". The review also commended Nick Chou's raw yet sensual rap performance for adding balance to the song's structure.

== Awards ==
On May 3, 2009, "Real Man" won Most Popular Mandarin Song at the first round of the J. S. G. Selections. On August 9, 2009, it received the Mandarin Dance Song Award at the Metro Radio Mandarin Hits Music Awards. On January 23, 2010, it won Best Dance Song and was listed among the Top 20 Songs at the My Astro Music Awards. On January 31, 2010, it was named one of the Top 10 Songs of 2009 at the Baidu Boiling Point Awards, and later that year, it was recognized as one of the Top 10 Mandarin Songs of the Year at the Hito Music Awards.

== Live performances ==
Tsai performed "Real Man" on April 2, 2009, on the Anhui Television's variety show Star Magic. She sang the song again on April 5, 2009, on the Hunan Television's program Happy Camp. The track was later included in her live set at the Music Radio China Top Chart Awards on April 26, 2009. On May 2, 2009, she performed it at the J. S. G. Selections, followed by another performance at the Metro Radio Mandarin Hits Music Awards on August 9, 2009. On February 12, 2010, Tsai performed the song at the Shining Hualien Concert in Taiwan.

== Personnel ==
- SSJ – executive production
- Andrew Chen – guitar
- Adia – background vocal arrangement
- Jolin Tsai – background vocals
- AJ Chen – recording engineering
- Mega Force Studio – recording and mixing studio
- Keller Wang – mixing engineering

== Release history ==
Release dates and formats for "Real Man"
Region	Date	Format(s)	Distributor
Taiwan	March 9, 2009	Radio airplay	Warner
