= Butterfly (Jolin Tsai album) =

2009 studio album by Jolin Tsai

- Standard edition cover

Studio album by Jolin Tsai
- Released: March 27, 2009
- Recorded: August–December 2008
- Genre: Pop
- Length: 1:18:03
- Label: Warner; Mars
- Producer: Adia; Paul Lee; Peter Lee; Paula Ma

Jolin Tsai chronology
Jeneration (2009)	Butterfly (2009)	Love & Live (2009)

Singles from Butterfly
- 1. "Real Man" Released: March 9, 2009

Butterfly (Chinese: 花蝴蝶) is the tenth original studio album by Taiwanese singer Jolin Tsai, released on March 27, 2009, by Warner. The album was produced by Adia, Paul Lee, Peter Lee, and Paula Ma.

In Taiwan, the album's pre-orders surpassed 120,000 copies, setting a new record for the highest pre-order volume in the region. Ultimately, Butterfly sold over 210,000 copies in Taiwan and exceeded one million copies across Asia, earning the title of Taiwan's best-selling album of 2009.

== Background and development ==
On July 4, 2008, Tsai's manager, Howard Chiang, revealed that she would begin recording a new album in August. On October 14, 2008, media reports indicated that Tsai was set to sign with Warner in December and disclosed that she had traveled to New York City in late September to learn new dance moves. Chiang stated, "She is accelerating her recording pace and hopes to release new work before the end of the year." On November 23, 2008, media outlets projected the album's release around the 2009 Lunar New Year.

On December 16, 2008, Tsai officially signed with Warner and announced that she had completed recording the new album and was beginning to film music videos. She noted the album would contain ten tracks, primarily dance songs, but also exploring new styles. Tsai collaborated with Real Huang from the band F.I.R. on a soft rock ballad.

By January 29, 2009, reports confirmed the album's planned release by the end of March. On February 27, it was revealed that Tsai would feature a duet with new artist Nick Chou and that the album's production cost exceeded NT$60 million.

== Writing and recording ==
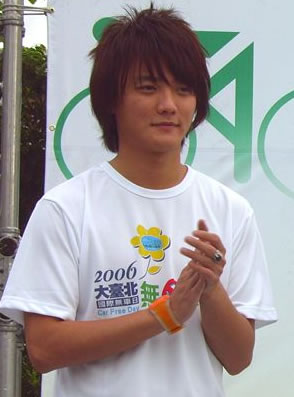
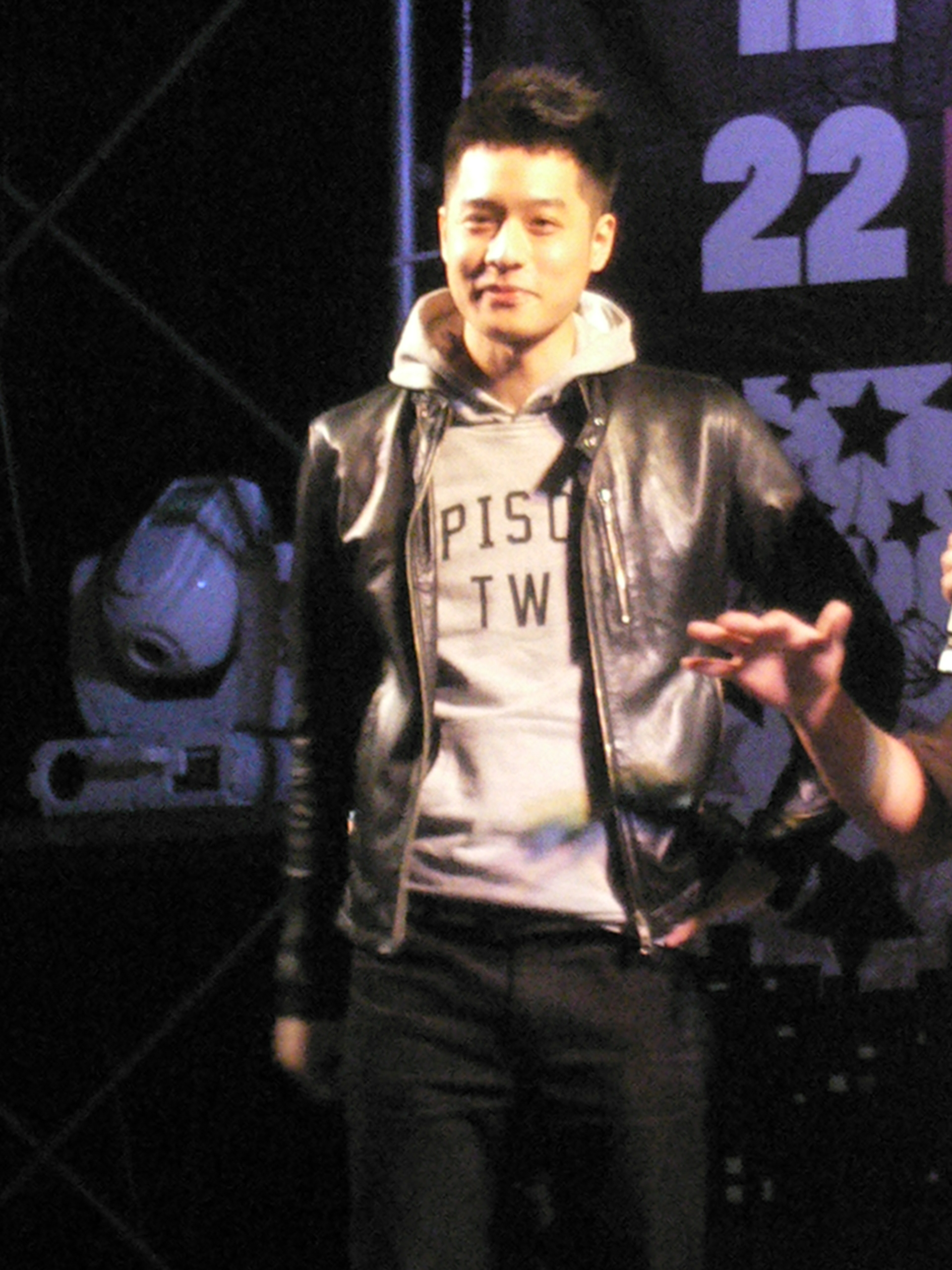
Real Huang (left) and Nick Chou (right), two collaborators on the album

The album's lead single, "Real Man", is a collaboration with new artist Nick Chou, blending dance-pop and hip-hop elements. Its lyrics describe the ideal standards modern women seek in their boyfriends. "Compromise" is a soft rock ballad addressing common unhealthy relationship patterns in contemporary life. Tsai explained that this song reflects the emotional wounds caused by one-sided compromises in love, emphasizing that true love should avoid unilateral concessions.

"Butterfly" encourages women to stay true to themselves without fearing others' opinions. "Slow Life" highlights how people today often rush through life and neglect its natural rhythm, advocating for embracing a slower, more mindful pace. "Accompany with Me" is a tender love song that Tsai suggested is perfect for weddings, expressing a promise of lifelong companionship. "Love Attraction" evokes a French romantic style.

"The Shadow Dancer" portrays the sorrow of loving someone selflessly, likening such love to a dancer moving in the darkness. "Parachute" conveys the hope of experiencing love that descends gently like a parachute, with Tsai noting her fondness for using metaphors to express her views on love. "You Hurt My Feelings" explores the emotional pain endured in a love triangle. Lastly, "Hot Winter" is a hard-hitting, rhythm-heavy dance track that examines modern proactive attitudes toward love, with an environmental theme woven into its lyrics.

== Title and artwork ==
The album title "Butterfly" symbolizes "rebirth through breaking out of a cocoon". Tsai explained, "Through this album, I want to tell all women to bravely be themselves, to not be afraid of how others see them, and to have the courage to become a beautiful butterfly." On the official album cover, Tsai is seen wearing a vibrant, multicolored dress designed by The Blonds.

== Release and promotion ==
On March 4, 2009, the album became available for pre-order at 7-Eleven stores across Taiwan. On March 12, 2009, pre-orders expanded to other music retail outlets throughout the region. That same day, Tsai held an album preview session in Taipei. On March 23, 2009, Warner announced a collaboration with Chunghwa Telecom to release the album in digital format, featuring exclusive behind-the-scenes footage and the music video for "Butterfly". With this release, Tsai became the first artist in Taiwan to launch a digital album.

On March 28, 2009, Tsai kicked off her Butterfly Campus Tour with a performance at Chung Hua University in Hsinchu. On April 7, 2009, media reported that due to a recurring injury and an exhausting schedule, she had decided to cancel a new tour originally set to begin in September. The tour was planned to include around ten shows across mainland China, Singapore, and Malaysia. Her manager, Howard Chiang, stated that Tsai might take a break from September through the end of the year.

On May 9, 2009, she held the Butterfly Concert in Taichung. On May 22, 2009, the deluxe edition of the album was released, which included five additional music videos. Later that month, due to her recurring injury, Tsai canceled the remaining stops of the Butterfly Campus Tour, ultimately performing only four shows.

=== Single and music videos ===
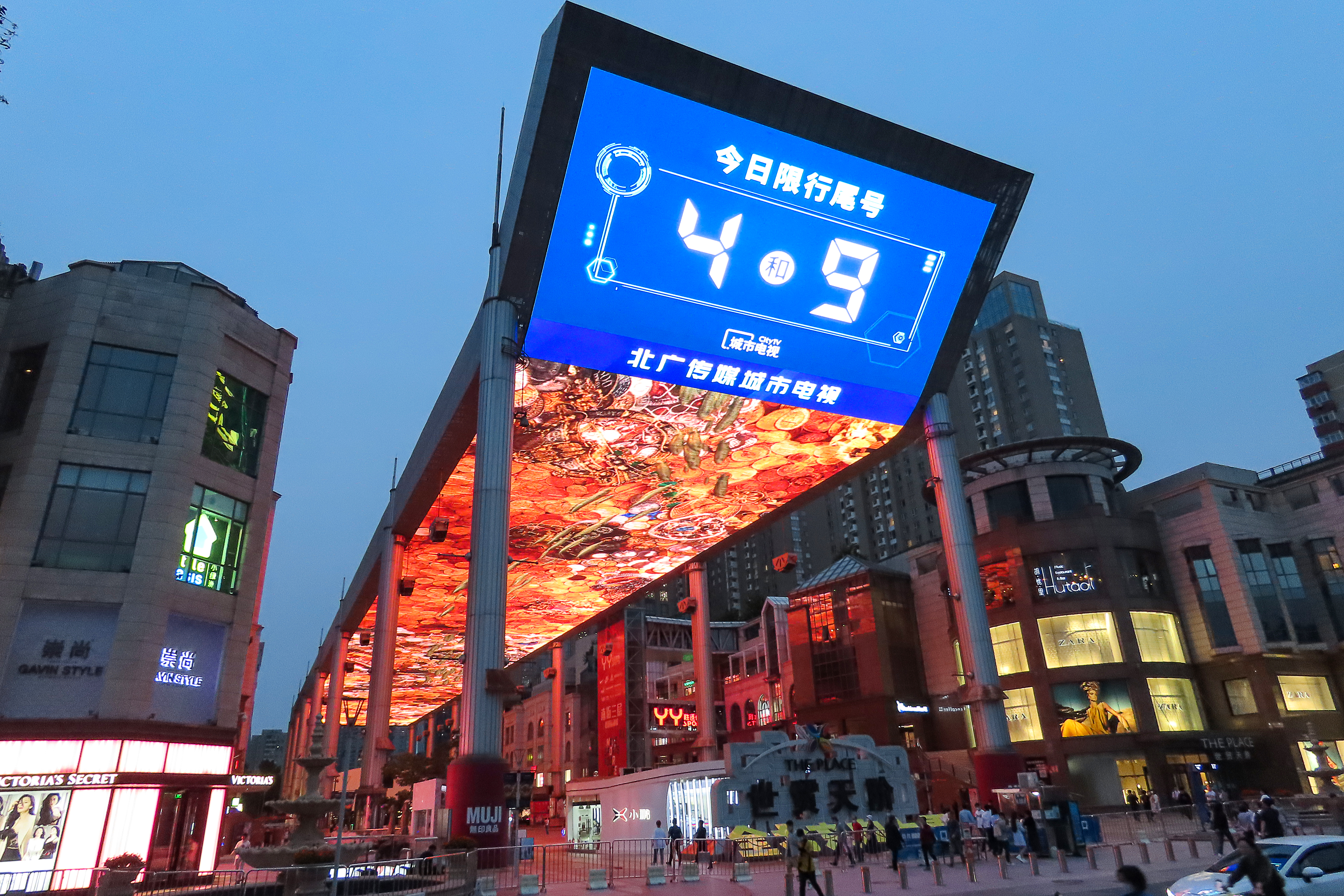
The music video for "Real Man" premiered at The Place in Beijing.

On March 8, 2009, Tsai premiered the music video for the song "Real Man" at a launch event held in Beijing. The event reportedly cost NT$850,000. The music video was directed by Marlboro Lai, with choreography by Jonte' Moaning. The single was officially released the following day, on March 9.

On March 23, 2009, Tsai released the music video for "Compromise", directed by Hsu Yun-hsuan, and featuring actor Ethan Juan. On March 30, 2009, she released the music video for "Butterfly", again directed by Marlboro Lai, with choreography by Bobby Newberry. In the video, Tsai showcased ballet fouetté turns and revealed that she spent three months training in ballet for the performance.

On April 14, 2009, the music video for "Slow Life" was released, also directed by Marlboro Lai. On April 24, 2009, the music video for "Accompany with Me" premiered, directed by Hsu Jun-ting, and featured guest appearances by actresses Ivy Chen and Jason Tsou.

=== Live performances ===
On April 2, 2009, Tsai appeared on the Anhui TV's variety show Star Magic 2009 and performed the songs "Butterfly", "Real Man", and "Compromise". The following day, April 3, 2009, she performed "Butterfly", "Slow Life", and "Compromise" on Hubei TV's variety show Music Rally. On April 5, 2009, she appeared on Hunan TV's variety show Happy Camp, where she performed "Real Man" and "Compromise". On April 26, 2009, Tsai performed "Butterfly" and "Real Man" at the 2009 Music Radio China Top Chart Awards. On May 2, 2009, she took part in 2009 Jade Solid Gold Awards, where she performed "Real Man". On July 11, 2009, she appeared on CCTV's variety show The Same Song and performed "Butterfly".

On August 8, Tsai participated in the Zhejiang TV's variety show Pepsi's Voice of the New Generation, where she performed "Compromise". The following day, August 9, 2009, she attended the 2009 Metro Radio Mandarin Hits Music Awards, where she performed "Compromise", "Real Man", and "Hot Winter". On September 2, 2009, Tsai appeared on Beijing TV's Super Talk Show and performed "Compromise". On January 24, 2010, she performed "Compromise" at the 5th KKBox Music Awards. On February 12, 2010, she participated in the Hometown of the Sun—Hualien Shining Concert in Hualien and performed "Real Man" and "Compromise". On April 24, 2010, she performed "Butterfly" at the 2010 Music Radio China Top Chart Awards. Subsequently, Tsai participated in various events, where she performed songs from the album.

== Commercial performance ==
On March 29, 2009, Warner announced that pre-orders for Butterfly in Taiwan had surpassed 120,000 copies. On June 2, 2009, Tsai held a press conference in Beijing, where she revealed that the album's total sales across Asia had exceeded one million copies. The album topped the weekly sales charts at major Taiwanese music retailers such as Chia Chyun Record, G-Music, and Five Music. As of December 31, 2009, Butterfly had sold over 210,000 copies in Taiwan, earning the number one spot on the year-end album sales charts from both G-Music and Five Music, making it the best-selling album of the year in Taiwan. Additionally, the songs "Real Man" and "Butterfly" ranked at number 25 and number 10 respectively on the 2009's Hit FM Top 100 Singles chart in Taiwan.

== Critical reception ==
Professional ratings
Review scores
Source	Rating
Freshmusic	5/10
Smart Info Magazine	3/5 stars
Southern Metropolis Daily	2/5 stars
The Beijing News	3/5 stars

NetEase Entertainment praised Butterfly as "a rare high-quality commercial dance-pop album", noting, "All ten tracks deliver constant surprises with no dull moments." The review further highlighted that beyond showcasing Tsai's growth in dance, her interpretation of ballads also reached a new level.

Smart Info magazine gave the album a rating of 3 out of 5, commenting that while the song selection was trendy, the album lacked true surprise or innovation. Nevertheless, it was deemed competent overall. The review also remarked that Tsai's courage in her musical direction did not quite match the boldness she demonstrated in her dance and physical performances.

NetEase Entertainment also pointed out that Tsai's current artistic trajectory reflected broader issues within the Mandopop industry, particularly a creative stagnation in dance music production. Despite the genre's popularity, producers often struggle to craft truly original works, resulting in frequent imitation of Western pop trends and exposing albums like Butterfly to direct comparisons.

Freshmusic gave the album a score of 5 out of 10, stating that if it had been a debut by a new artist, it might have received more favorable reviews. However, considering it was the first album released by the region's top-selling diva after switching record labels, the sense of disappointment was difficult to overlook.

== Accolades ==
On May 3, 2009, the song "Real Man" won the 2009 Jade Solid Gold Award for Most Popular Mandarin Song. On August 9, 2009, Tsai received several awards at the 2009 Metro Radio Mandarin Hits Music Awards, including the Singer of the Year, Global Dancing Singer, and Global Stage Performance. The song "Real Man" was also awarded the Best Dance Song, while "Compromise" won the Top Songs.

On December 20, 2009, Tsai received further recognition at the 2009 Migu Music Awards, where she won Best Album-Selling Female Singer and Best Selling Female Singer. On January 23, 2010, "Real Man" won the 1st My Astro Music Awards for Top Dance Song and Top 20 Songs. The following day, Tsai was awarded the Top 10 Singers at the 5th KKBox Music Awards. On January 31, 2010, "Compromise" and "Real Man" were awarded the Top 10 Songs at the 2009 Baidu Boiling Point Awards.

On April 11, 2010, at the 10th Top Chinese Music Awards, Tsai was honored with the Most Influential Hong Kong/Taiwan Musician of the Decade award, and her song "Butterfly" was named one of the Top 10 Hong Kong/Taiwan Songs of the Decade. On April 24, 2010, she won several accolades at the 2010 Music Radio China Top Chart Awards, including Best Hong Kong/Taiwan Female Singer of the Year, Best Hong Kong/Taiwan Album of the Year for the album Butterfly, and Top Hong Kong/Taiwan Songs of the Year for "Butterfly". Additionally, the album received the 2010 Hito Music Awards for Longest Chart-Topping Album and the song "Real Man" was named one of the Top 10 Mandarin Songs of the Year.

== Track listing ==
Butterfly – Standard / Digital / Ultimate edition
No.	Title	Lyrics	Music	Producer(s)	Length
1.	"Butterfly" (花蝴蝶)	Matthew Yen	Anders Kjer; David Clewett; Alice Gernandt	Adia	3:10
2.	"Love Attraction" (愛引力)	Sunny Lee	Michel Daudin; Matthieu Chedid	Paul Lee	2:40
3.	"The Shadow Dancer" (影舞者)	Issac Chen	Christian Lindberg; Ivar Lisinski; Billy Mann	Adia	3:40
4.	"Compromise" (妥協)	Howard Chiang	Real Huang; Real Band	Peter Lee	4:24
5.	"Real Man" (大丈夫)	Issac Chen	Jonas Jeberg; Mikkel Sigvardt; Mich Hansen; Nina Woodford	Adia	3:19
6.	"Parachute" (降落傘)	Zyan Chen	Zyan Chen	Paula Ma	4:34
7.	"Slow Life" (愈慢愈美麗)	Issac Chen	Thomas Eriksson	Adia	3:02
8.	"Accompany with Me" (我的依賴)	Daryl Yao	Yi Jet Qi	Paula Ma	4:20
9.	"You Hurt My Feelings" (你快樂我內傷)	Albert Leung	Tan Vui Chuan	Peter Lee	4:28
10.	"Hot Winter" (熱冬)	Howard Chiang; Jimmy Chou; Gino Chen	Mikkel Sigvardt; Thomas Troelsen	Adia	3:51
Total length:					37:28

Butterfly – Standard edition (DVD)
No.	Title	Length
1.	"Real Man" (dance video)	3:36
2.	"Butterfly" (dance video)	3:08
3.	"Real Man" (dance tutorial)	20:05
4.	"Butterfly" (dance tutorial)	13:46
Total length:		40:35

Butterfly – Digital edition (digital download)
No.	Title	Length
1.	"Butterfly" (music video)	3:22
Total length:		3:22

Butterfly – Ultimate edition (DVD)
No.	Title	Length
1.	"Real Man" (music video)	3:44
2.	"Compromise" (music video)	4:22
3.	"Butterfly" (music video)	3:22
4.	"Slow Life" (music video)	3:01
5.	"Accompany with Me" (music video)	4:26
Total length:		18:55

== Release history ==
Region	Date	Format(s)	Edition(s)	Distributor
Various	March 27, 2009	Streaming	Standard	Mars
China	March 27, 2009	Streaming	Standard	YDX
China	March 27, 2009	CD	Standard; pre-ordered	Sky
China	May 22, 2009	CD+DVD	Ultimate	Sky
Hong Kong	March 27, 2009	CD	Standard; limited	Warner
Malaysia	March 27, 2009	CD	Standard	Warner
Malaysia	May 22, 2009	CD+DVD	Ultimate	Warner
Singapore	March 27, 2009	CD	Standard; limited	Warner
Singapore	May 22, 2009	CD+DVD	Ultimate	Warner
Taiwan	March 27, 2009	CD+DVD	Standard	Warner
Taiwan	March 27, 2009	CD	Pre-ordered	Warner
Taiwan	March 27, 2009	Digital download	Digital	Warner
Taiwan	May 22, 2009	CD+DVD	Ultimate	Warner
