= Atlantis (F.I.R. album) =

Chapter VI 【Atlantis】

Studio album by F.I.R.
- Released: April 15, 2011
- Genre: Mandopop
- Label: Warner Music
- Producer: Ian Chen (陳建寧)

F.I.R. chronology
Let's Smile (2009)	Chapter VI 【Atlantis】 (2011)	Better Life (2014)

Chapter VI 【Atlantis】 (Chinese: 第六章【亞特蘭提斯】) is the sixth studio album of Taiwanese band F.I.R. It was released on April 15, 2011.

== Track listing ==
All music is composed by Ian Chen.

No.	Title	Length
1.	"亞特蘭提斯 (Atlantis)"
2.	"淚光閃爍 (Drowning Tears)"
3.	"花非花 (Old Days Have Gone With Wind)"
4.	"我超越 (I Shall Transcend)"
5.	"愛有路可退 (The Way Out Of Love)"
6.	"微光 (Glimmer )"
7.	"Say Hello"
8.	"唐吉訶德 (Don Quixote)"
9.	"讓愛重生 (Let Love Be Reborn)"
10.	"螺絲釘 (screws)"

== Charts ==
Release	Chart	Peak position
15 April 2011	G-music Top 20	1
