= I Love You So Much =

- Promotional poster
- 粉愛粉愛你
- Genre: Romance; Comedy
- Directed by: Liu Jun Jie (劉俊傑)
- Starring: Lan Cheng Long; Li Jia Ying; Nick Chou; Mao Di; Tom Price
- Opening theme: "愛走秀" (Ai Zhou Xiu) by Show Lo
- Ending theme: "億萬分之一的機率" (i Wan Fen Zhi Yi De Ji Lu) by Nick Chou
- Country of origin: Taiwan
- Original language: Mandarin
- No. of series: 1
- No. of episodes: 16

Production
- Production location: Taiwan
- Running time: 90 minutes
- Production company: Meng Tian Chong Production Company

Original release
- Network: CTS
- Release: 29 January – 13 May 2012

Related
- Ring Ring Bell

I Love You So Much (Chinese: 粉愛粉愛你) is a 2012 Taiwanese romantic-comedy television series. The television drama was produced by Meng Tian Chong Production Company, starring Lan Cheng-lung, Nick Chou and Li Jia Ying. It was first aired on January 29, 2012 on CTS.

The series was nominated for the Best Art and Design Award at the 47th Golden Bell Awards.

== Synopsis ==
Xia Le Di (Li Jia Ying) was an arrogant, self-absorbed socialite. Soon after, her father's business went bankrupt and left her penniless. She believed that it happened because his competitor, JEALOUS, stole "Mona Lisa", a revolutionary makeup technology that her father's company developed. Therefore, she vowed to get it back. She went undercover at JEALOUS, the rival company, working as an assistant to Chang Yu Jie (Lan Cheng Long), the heartless operation manager and lead makeup artist. While she focused her investigation on him, her romantic interest wandered to his charming half-brother Chang Shao Feng (Nick Chou). Will she ever get "Mona Lisa" and her family's company back?

== Cast ==
=== Main ===
- Lan Cheng-lung as Chang Yu Jie
- Li Jia Ying as Xia Le Di
- Nick Chou as Chang Shao Feng
- Shara Lin as Wen Xi/ Cola
- Mao Di as Mao Di
- Tom Price (白梓轩) as Daniel

=== Supporting ===
- Ji Qin as Zeng Na Mei
- Mi Ke Bai (by Luo Ke Shu
- Dong Zhi Cheng as Zhuang Ying Xiong
- Chris Wu as Bu Hao Wen
- Lin Jun Yong
- Angie Tang as Grandma Chang
- Ding Qiang
- George Zhang
- Patty Wu
- Lance Yu as Mr. Zhuang
- Zhang Jun Ming as Ming Li

== Broadcast ==
Network	Country/Location	Airing Date	Timeslot
CTS	Taiwan	January 29, 2012	Sundays, 10pm
東森綜合台	Taiwan	February 4, 2012	Saturdays, 10pm
煲劇1台	Hong Kong	June 17, 2012	Sundays, 7:30pm
星和都會台	Singapore	July 29, 2012	Sundays, 10:30pm
Astro 双星	Malaysia	July 9, 2012	Mondays-Fridays, 10:30pm
LS TIMES TV (龍祥頻道)	Canada	July 10, 2012	Mondays-Fridays, 7:00pm
BS スカハー播出~	Japan	October 4, 2012	Thursdays, 1:15pm

== Soundtrack ==
I Love You so Much

Soundtrack album
- Released: April 17, 2012
- Genre: Mandopop
- Language: Mandarin
- Label: Gold Typhoon (TW)

I Love You so Much Original Soundtrack (粉愛粉愛你 電視原聲帶) was released on April 17, 2012 by various artists under Gold Typhoon Taiwan. It contains eleven songs, in which two of them are instrumental versions of the opening and ending songs. The opening theme song is "Ai Zhou Xiu" or "Love is a Show" by Show Lo, while the ending theme song is by Nick Chou entitled "i Wan Fen Zhi Yi De Ji Lu" or "One Out Of A Million".

=== Track listing ===
No.	Title	Lyrics	Music	Singer	Length
1.	"Love is a Show" (愛走秀)	葛大為	徐浩、Randy Chow	Show Lo	03:00
2.	"When The King Meets The Queen" (王見王)	徐世珍	Michael Grant、Lara Nahum	Show Lo and Rainie Yang	03:38
3.	"One Out Of A Million" (億萬分之一的機率)	吳易緯	Nick Chou	Nick Chou	03:39
4.	"Can't Force Love" (逞強)	姚若龍	饒善強	Elva Hsiao	03:51
5.	"Love In Fantasy" (愛入非非)	陳天佑	李華章 Lee Hua Chang	Show Lo	04:53
6.	"Wings Of Tears" (淚光翅膀)	吳易緯	洪菁瑩	Lan Cheng Long	03:49
7.	"Love Is A Show isn't." (愛走秀(俏皮版))		徐浩、Randy Chow		01:55
8.	"Super Nice Girl"	Nick Chou, 陳天佑	Nick Chou	Nick Chou	03:57
9.	"Heartache" (內傷)	葛大為	Nick Chou	Nick Chou	04:01
10.	"Stop Crying For Me" (別為我哭了)	嚴云農	曾芯儀	Lan Cheng Long	04:24
11.	"One Out Of A Million inst." (億萬分之一的機率(深情版))		Nick Chou		03:19
Total length:					38:26

== Other multimedia ==
Game APP - I Love You so Much - Quiz Buzz ² (遊戲APP：粉愛粉愛你 – Quiz叮咚²)

The Game APP is a makeup knowledge quiz games created with the cooperation of Daewoo and iOS platform. In the game, players will play the heroine, studying the beauty and career advancement of knowledge from the four Jealous' makeup artists (J4). The App was released on February 23, 2012 in Apple's App Store shelves.

== Ratings ==
I Love You so Much ranked third in its pilot episode, until it gradually goes to the second spot on the last half of the series, with a total average of 1.00. Its drama competitors were TTV's Office Girls and Love Forward, CTS's Laoba Jiadao, and FTV's Skip Beat! and Absolute Darling. The viewers survey was conducted by AGB Nielsen.

Air Date	Episode	Episode Title	Average Ratings	Rank	Remarks
2012/01/29	01	Gorgeous Consideration 華麗的代價	0.84	3	total population of 1,110,005 viewers
2012/02/05	02	公主復國記	0.49	4	
2012/02/12	03	" Mona Lisa" snatch war 蒙娜麗莎搶奪戰	0.48	3	
2012/02/19	04	-	0.75	3	
2012/02/26	05	Deja Vu 似曾相識	1.20	3	
2012/03/04	06	令人發囧的緣份	1.06	3	
2012/03/11	07	Who's that girl?	1.17	3	
2012/03/18	08	Who is Up To No Good 是誰在搞鬼	0.89	3	
2012/03/25	09	Damn Princess 公主該死	1.06	3	
2012/04/01	10	Love Big Wind 愛情大風吹	1.02	3	
2012/04/08	11	被攔胡的愛	1.23	2	
2012/04/15	12	Turn it, Turn It, Love Roulette 轉吧轉吧，愛情的輪盤	1.19	2	
2012/04/22	13	公主巫婆釘孤支	1.25	2	
2012/04/29	14	Ghosts' Action 抓鬼行動	0.92	2	
2012/05/06	15	憨戀轉運戰	1.20	2	
2012/05/13	16	愛情別再妝	1.21	2	Final episode
Total average			1.00		

== Awards and nominations ==
Year	Ceremony	Category	Nominee	Result
2012	47th Golden Bell Awards	Best Art and Design Award	Chien Yu (簡春玉)	Nominated
