= Let's Smile =

Studio album by F.I.R.
- Released: December 25, 2009
- Recorded: 2008~2009
- Genre: Mandopop
- Label: Warner Music
- Producer: Ian Chen (陳建寧)

F.I.R. chronology
| Love · Diva 愛 · 歌姬 (2007) | Let's Smile (2009) | Atlantis (2011) |

Let's Smile (Chinese: 讓我們一起微笑吧) is F.I.R.'s 5th Anniversary album, which was released on 25 December 2009. 'WE ARE' is the song which marks the fifth anniversary of the band, after forming the band as F.I.R. in 2004. The album features 11 new tracks, with the song 'Hero' being offered as a bonus track. The release of this album also marks the 5th anniversary of the band F.I.R..

The seventh track "荊棘裡的花" (A Flower Among Thorns) is listed at number 94 on Hit FM's Hit Fm Annual Top 100 Singles Chart (Hit-Fm年度百首單曲) for 2010.

== Track listing ==
- "Find My Way"
- "I Am Here"
- "向日葵盛開的夏天" (Summer with Bloom of Sunflowers)
- "紀念日" (Memorial Day)
- "衝浪季節" (Surfing Season)
- "紅潮" (Red Tides)
- "荊棘裡的花" (Flower Among Thorns)
- "讓我們一起微笑吧" (Let's Smile)
- "貓頭鷹的夢" (Owl's Dream)
- "WE ARE"
  - Track for 5th anniversary of F.I.R.
- "Hero" (Bonus Track)

== Chart ==
| Release | Chart | Peak position |
|---|---|---|
| 25 December 2009 | G-music Top 1 | 1 |
| 25 December 2009 | Hito board Top 1 | 1 |
