= Danielle Senior =

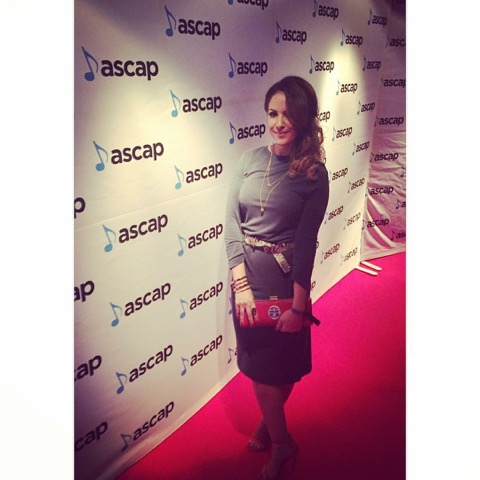
- Danielle Senior at 2016 ASCAP awards

Background information
- Also known as: Dani Senior
- Origin: London, England
- Genres: Pop, EDM, hip hop, R&B
- Occupations: Songwriter, singer, DJ
- Instruments: Vocals, piano
- Labels: Sony Music Entertainment, Warner Music Group, AATW, Polydor Records, Sony/ATV Music Publishing, Avex Group, SM Entertainment

Danielle Senior, now known as Dani Senior, is a London-based multi-platinum selling singer-songwriter, vocal producer and DJ, originally from Devon in the United Kingdom.

She spent part of her childhood growing up in Stavanger, Norway. She is notable for her versatile writing style and has written for, and collaborated with, artists across a range of genres internationally, including Plan B (musician), Wretch 32, Shystie, Shenseea, Rationale (musician), Michael Woods (DJ), Sander van Doorn, Nora En Pure, Doctor P, Lvndscape, Burns (musician), Michael Gray (DJ), and for K-pop, J-pop and Cantopop superstars such as Twice, SHINee, KARA, Mariya Nishiuchi, FEMM, Jolin Tsai, Twins (group), and Raymond Lam, amongst others. In 2016 she collaborated with Gareth Malone on the charity single "Flesh and Blood" for The Choir For The Invictus Games feat. Laura Wright (singer), which debuted in the top 20 of the Official Singles Chart (UK) and hit no.1 on the iTunes Classical Music Chart, no.2 on the iTunes Pop Music Chart and no.5 on the Vodafone Big Top 40 Chart and Capital FM's top 10 Chart.

== Music career ==
Dani's first official release was "One Wish" for Shystie in 2003, on which she part co-wrote and sang backing vocals. "One Wish" was the lead single taken from the "Diamond in the Dirt" album, and was released through Polydor Records. Other artist collaborations at that time include Plan B, and Wretch 32 on her own self-released music. Through persistent underground releases on her own independent record label she eventually caught the eye of All Around the World Productions who signed her shortly after due to the popularity of her song, the self-penned "Take It to the Dancefloor".

As a persistent collaborator with DJs and Producers within the EDM scene she has written and featured on hit singles including, "Run This Town" Ft. Shenseea for OFFAIAH released by Positiva Records Virgin EMI Records on 18 August 2018, (nominated for Best Single and Best Newcomer at the Urban Music Awards UK that year), "Tell My Heart" Featuring Dani Senior for Nora En Pure which spawned a world tour of the same name and "Need to Feel Loved" with Sander van Doorn & Lvndscape both released on Spinnin' Records, as well as working with acts such as The Wideboys, AurA and Cozi Costi. As an artist she recently teamed up production duos from Northern Ireland Glass Keys and Menrva, to release her single "Unwant You" on 4 April 2021, on the esteemed Swiss EDM label, Sirup Music owned by grammy-nominated EDX (DJ). This follows on from her recent releases "Way To You" with Doctor P, and "Get No Better" with Eskei83 and ReauBeau, both on the label owned by Doctor P and Flux Pavilion, Circus Records.

Other song-writing credits include: Twicecoaster: Lane 1, Dani co-wrote the official fan single "One In A Million", and the album sold a record-breaking 36 thousand units in one day. It was reported that the album recorded more than 165,000 physical sales on the Gaon Chart within a week, recording the highest sales for a Korean girl group album for the year 2016. The album also debuted atop the Weekly Gaon Album Chart and entered the Billboard World Albums chart at number 3 in its chart issue dated November 12. By the end of the year, the album became the fifth best-selling album release and the best-selling Korean girl group album for 2016, recording 350,852 copies sold. Dani also co-wrote "Born to Shine" from the no.1 selling "SHINee World I'm your Boy Special Edition in Tokyo Dome" DVD for SHINee (Oricon Album Chart), "Honey Trap" (winner of two My Astro Music Awards for Best Dance Song and Top 20 Songs of the Year) for Jolin Tsai and also the lead single from the no.1 and best-selling female album Myself in Taiwan that year (Platinum status), Kara on the top 5 selling album "A Girl's Story" (Oricon Album Chart), "Kiss The Rain" for Femm, touted as ones to watch for 2016 by the Huffington Post - the album charted on the Billboard World Albums chart at no.10 and was described by the Huffington Post as "catchy and very cleverly written pop", "Safety Net" for Lin Yu Chun, dubbed Taiwan's Susan Boyle - also used as part of a governmental campaign for Peace in Taiwan, British rapper and BBC Radio 1Xtra broadcaster Amplify Dot, the top 10 dance single in France "Warrior" for Lumberjack feat. Cozi Costi, Amplify Dot, Danish Eurovision Song Contest competitors Anti Social Media, TQ, Honorata Skarbek ("Street Drug" - album certified Gold status), The Voice of China and Queensberry (band) for Popstars Germany, amongst many other international song placements.

Dani has also worked with Labrinth, James Hype, Kideko, Tim Powell, The Overtones, and Dominique Young Unique, most known for her DJ Fresh vs Diplo's UK top 5 in the Official Singles Chart, "Earthquake".

Dani is a graduate in English Literature and also studied at LAMDA (London Academy of Music and Dramatic Art).
