= Unlimited (F.I.R. album) =

Studio album by F.I.R.
- Released: April 8, 2005
- Recorded: 2004~2005
- Genre: Alternative pop, Mandopop, pop rock, C-rock, experimental, electronic rock, electronica
- Length: 44:29
- Label: Warner Music
- Producer: Ian Chen (陳建寧)

F.I.R. chronology
F.I.R.-Fairyland in Reality (2004)	Unlimited (2005)	Flight Tribe (2006)

Unlimited (Chinese: 無限) is F.I.R.'s 2nd album. It was released on 8 April 2005. This album also has Thorn Bird Glory Limited Edition. "無限 (Unlimited)" stayed in G-music chart for 21 weeks (3rd place in 2005).

Part of songs in this album was produced in Sarm West Studio in London. The songs "千年之戀", "LOVE*3", "應許之地", "把愛放開", "刺鳥", "死心的理由" and the instrumental tracks "盛宴..." and "傳說..." were coordinated with London Philharmonic Orchestra.

The track "千年之戀" (Thousand Years of Love) was nominated for Top 10 Gold Songs at the Hong Kong TVB8 Awards, presented by television station TVB8, in 2005.

The album was awarded one of the Top 10 Selling Mandarin Albums of the Year at the 2005 IFPI Hong Kong Album Sales Awards, presented by the Hong Kong branch of IFPI.

== Track listing ==
1. 無限 (Unlimited) - 3'39"
2. 千年之戀 [Translation: Thousand Years of Love] - 3"49"
3. LOVE*3 - 4'05"
4. 盛宴... [Translation: Banquet...]- 0'44"
5. 應許之地 [Translation: The Holy Land] - 4'45"
6. 把愛放開 [Translation: Let Love Go] - 4'49"
7. Neverland - 4'08"
8. 傳說... [Translation: The Legend...] - 1'58"
9. 刺鳥 [Translation: Thorn Bird] - 4'05"
10. 愛的力量 [Translation: The Power of Love] - 3'38"
11. 死心的理由 [Translation: The Reason of Giving Up] - 4'13"
12. I Can't Go On - 3'25"
13. What's Next? - 0'50"
14. 消失 [Translation: Disappear] - 4'36"
- Bonus track from 無限 (Unlimited): 刺鳥榮耀珍藏版, the first press limited edition of the album

=== To Be Announced "Unlimited 無限" ===
The introduction of the 1st track "無限 (Unlimited)" is the instrumental melody of "To Be Announced" from their first album.

=== "What's Next? ===
The 13th track "What's Next?", just like last album, vaguely announced the song of the next album. The lyrics announced that their third album would be produced in New York City, and the song should have the genre, Jazz rock.

== Chart ==
Release	Chart	Peak position
8 April 2005	G-music Top 20	1
8 April 2005	Hito board Top 10	1
