= George Leong =

Singaporean musician

George Leong 梁伯君
- Born: George Leong Pak Kuan; Singapore
- Genres: Mandarin pop, electronic music, classical, popular, dance music, soundtrack
- Occupations: Music arranger, producer, composer, music director, audio engineer

George Leong (born 1970) is a Singaporean musician, producer and composer.

== Biography ==
George Leong's musical career in the recording industry began early, with his involvement with the xinyao (Songs composed and sung by Singaporeans) movement in 1987. He is known for his music arrangement work on Leslie Cheung's biggest hit "Chase" and Sandy Lam's Scars album. He arranged sound tracks for films such as Red Rose White Rose, He's a Woman, She's a Man, The Phantom Lover, Little Dragon Maiden, and The Bride with White Hair. In 1992, Leong produced a number of Chris Ho's songs, including "Deeper", in the album Save Sex, commissioned by Action for AIDS, Singapore. Then in 1993, Leong co-produced Dick Lee's "Year of the Monkey". He is a winner of the COMPASS' Artistic Excellence Artist award alongside Mark Chan and M. Osman in 2016. Mark Chan and George Leong collaborates closely in finding a form and sound for a distinctively Singaporean Pop music.

His contribution to Singapore's cultural heritage includes arranging and producing the soundtracks for Fried Rice Paradise — The Drama Series, a stage to television adaptation of Dick Lee's iconic musical. He is also the music arranger, producer and mixing engineer for the 900-voices virtual choir video rendition of Home, which was then used in a national synchronic sing-a-long as a tribute to migrant and healthcare workers in Singapore during the COVID-19 pandemic. A veteran producer, George has been engaged to mentor emerging Singapore pop musicians in both their professional and artistic development.

== Production and discography ==
=== Original Composition ===
George Leong composed original music for the following artistes:

- Alex To 杜德伟 and Rock Records: 我的寶貝怕孤單 in 冒險游戲 (1993). 愛你愛的不尋常 in 絕對杜德偉 (1994). 放蕩不羈 in 天真 (1995). 盪得起 in 知解 (1987).
- Andy Hui 許志安: 你説謊 in 男人心 (2000, Sony).
- Coco Lee 李玟: 等愛降落, 路上 in 每一次想你 (1997, Sony).
- Energy: 永遠不說再見 in Come On (2002).
- Fish Leong 梁靜茹: 彩虹 in 一夜長大 (1999).
- Game Boys: 舞會 in One More Round (1993).
- Karen Mok 莫文蔚: 愛麗斯永遠住這裡, 潮濕 in 全身莫文蔚 (1996, Rock).
- May Day: 彩紅 in 人生海海 (2001).
- OST 新好男人: 夜間人靜, 愛倫之歌, 摩娜戀曲, 流星, 白日夢, 總會有人愛我 (2000, Atomic).
- OST 金枝玉葉: 快快快粉啐寂寞－風火海 (1994).
- Pheobe Huang: 為什麼不是我 in 我們都要 (2000, Rock).
- Terry Lin 林志炫: 摸哪裡撒的眼淚 in Miss Mama (1998).
- Wind Sea Fire: 快快快粉碎寂寞, 自言自語 in 風火海 (1994).
- Winnie Hsin 辛曉琪: 就讓我這樣吧 in 女人何苦爲難女人 (1997, Rock).
- Wong He 王喜: 流星 in 王喜-喜新唱歌 (2001).
- 小松小柏: Baby You Should Be Dancing and 讓心情太陽一下 in Baby You Should Be Dancing (1990).
- Wu Qi: 失約 and 她是誰 in 妳怎麼沒看見 (1996), My Girlfriend in 不顧一切 (1995).

=== Music Production ===
George Leong produced records for the following artistes:

- Alex To 杜德伟: Two Out Of Three Ain't Bad, Kiss, Everytime You Go Away, Sugar Sugar, Cherish in Best Love (1996, Rock). Let's Wait Awhile, Love Is Love, Suddenly, Turn Back The Clock, You're My Everything in Best Love (1995, Rock).
- Derrick Hoh 何維健: 當我知道你們相愛 Remix in Change 變化 (2010, Warner).
- Dragonfly: Dragonfly Sampler (2007, Universal).
- Fish Leong 梁靜茹: 一夜長大, 彩虹, 轉圈圈, 迷路 in 一夜長大 (1999, Rock).
- Hagen Troy 陳孟奇: 20 Years - AFA/SDT Anniversary Album (2008).
- Instrumentals: Drama Moods 2001, Drama Moods 2000 (Atomic Records).
- Jolin Tsai 蔡依林: 七上八下 Remix, 奴人計 Remix in 奴人計 (2010, Warner).
- Karen Mok 莫文蔚: 愛麗斯永遠住這裡, 比夜更黑 in 全身莫文蔚 (1996, Rock).
- Kiat Goh 吳杰鳴: 冥王星 (2014, Warner).
- Nat Ho: Unleashed (2012, Warner).
- OST: 大喜事 - The Wedding Game (2009), 新好男人 (2000).
- Rene Liu 劉若英: Flying and 很愛很愛你 in 很愛很愛你 (1998, Rock).
- Sammi Cheng 鄭秀文: 做好準備 and 城市說話 in 我應該得到 (1999, Warner).
- Shayna Toh: EP (2014).
- Sylvester Sim 沈祥龍: I'll Find My Way, 只想, 眼中的永遠 in 起飛 (2005, Sony).
- Taufik Batisah: Backup Against The Wall in Blessings (2005, Sony).
- Wong He 王喜: 王喜-喜新唱歌 (2001).
- X'Ho: Motorcycle Hero and Save Sex in Punkmonkhunk (1994). Kites in Skin Deep (1994, Pony Canyon).
- Yuki Hsu 徐懷鈺: Dub-I-Dub and 愛是 Easy Game in Yuki (1998, Rock). 5,6,7,8, Going, 叮咚, 向前衝, 嘔氣881, 疑心病 in 向前衝 (1998, Rock).
- 巫奇: 专一 (1996, Rock). 妳怎麼沒看見 (1996, Rock).
- 符杰荣: 付出 in Tonight (2014, Ocean Butterflies).

=== Music Arrangement ===
George Leong arranged music for the following artistes:

- A-Mei 張惠妹: 渴了 in 你在看我嗎 (2011, Gold Typhoon).
- Aaron Kwok 郭富城: 犧牲 in 真的拍了 (1994).
- Alex To 杜德伟 and Rock Records: Rock Your Soul in So Young (2013). 著迷 (1999). 發現愛 (1996). Best Love (1996, 1995). 天真 (1995). 我的,杜德偉 (1995). 冒險游戲 (1993).
- Anita Mui 梅艷芳: 只羨鴛鴦不羨仙, 大家都快樂, 落葉不歸根 in 小心 (1994).
- ARA: Macarena in 弓在弦上 (1997, Elite 巨石).
- Chiang Shu-na 江淑娜: 放不下, 長夜悄悄 in 長夜悄悄 - 九月(1996).
- Christine Hsu 許景淳: 追尋我的腳步 in 芬芳 (1996, Rock). 不要做你的知己 in 女人哪 (1995, Rock).
- Derrick Hoh 何維健: 當我知道你們相愛 Remix in Change 變化 (2010, Warner).
- Energy: 永遠不說再見 in Come On (2002).
- Evonne Hsu 许慧欣: Let You Go in 快乐为主 (2002).
- Fantasy: Fantasy (1999, Avex Trax).
- Fish Leong 梁靜茹: 一夜長大 (1999, Rock).
- Game Boys: One More Round (1993).
- Hagen Troy 陳孟奇: 20 Years - AFA/SDT Anniversary Album (2008).
- Instrumentals: Drama Moods 2001, Drama Moods 2000 (Atomic Records).
- Jackie Chan 成龍: 怎麼會 in 龍的心 (1996).
- Jeff Chang 張信哲: 求愛 in 回來 (1999, Tide Music).
- Jessica Su: Love Is Forever, Piano In The Dark, Sorry If I Broke Your Heart in Attracted (1990, BMG).
- Jimmy Ye 叶良俊: 你还好吗？in 你还好吗? (2015, TCR).
- Johnny Chen 小蟲: 想得太美 (1996, Rock).
- Johnny Yin 殷正洋: 種一棵樹 in 該給你多少 (1997, BMG).
- Jolin Tsai 蔡依林: 奴人計 (2010, Warner).
- Julia Peng 彭佳慧: 因為我愛你, 體溫 in 彭佳慧 Julia (1997, Elite 巨石).
- Karen Mok 莫文蔚: 愛麗斯永遠住這裡, 比夜更黑 in 全身莫文蔚 (1996, Rock).
- Kenny Bee 鍾鎮濤: I'd Love You To Want Me in Why Worry (1997, Elite 巨石).
- Kiat Goh 吳杰鳴: Chiron and 無可取代 in 冥王星 (2014, Warner).
- Leslie Cheung 張國榮: 一輩子失去了妳, 今生今世, 何去何從之阿飛正傳, 夜半歌聲, 當愛己成往事, 眉來眼去, 紅顏白髮, 追 in 寵愛 (1995).
- Li Feihui 黎沸挥: 两颗心就不寂寞, 你需要的爱我没有, 在世界放光芒, 忍不住还是爱上你, 爱从我的心飞向你 in 等你等到我心痛 (1991, Wind).
- Lily Lee 李麗芬: 就這樣約定 (1994), 發現 (1993, 王者之劍, 滾石).
- Maizurah Hamzah: Don't Do This To Me and Undercover Love in That's The Way Love Is (1994).
- Mediacorp: The 5 Show Themes in The 5 Show (2015, Mediacorp).
- Nat Ho: Unleashed (2012, Warner).
- OST: 爱反复 (Hagen Tan 陈孟奇) and 爱反复 (吉他伴奏版) in 大喜事 - The Wedding Game (2009). 新好男人 (2000). 如泣如訴 - 杜德偉, 少女問 - 蘇慧倫, 快快快粉啐寂寞－風火海, 無所謂 in 金枝玉葉 (1994).
- Peggy Hsu 許哲珮: 瘋子, 白日夢飛行 in 許願盒 (2007, Sony BMG). 爽约 in 气球 (2001).
- Phoebe Huang: 愛已經滿滿的 in 愛已經滿滿的 (1998, Rock).
- Regina sang: 一往情深, 大地, 戀, 相戀, 真情真情真多情 in 一往情深 (1993, 王者之劍，滾石).
- Rene Liu 劉若英: Flying and 很愛很愛你 in 很愛很愛你 (1998, Rock).
- Richie Jen 任賢齊 and Rock: 依靠 and 這樣也好 in 台灣男兒 (1999). 寶貝, 愛怎麼會是這樣, 日出東方, 若是你在我身邊, 這樣也好 in 很受傷 (1997). 依靠, 愛怎麼放手, 愛過才心痛 in 依靠 (1996).
- Sammi Cheng 鄭秀文: 做好準備, 城市說話, 永遠都不夠 in 我應該得到 (1999, Warner).
- Sandy Lam 林億蓮: 不爱的理由, 听说爱情回来过, 愛不了多久, 知难不退 in 傷痕 (1995). 野風 in 唱作剧佳 (1996, Rock). 玫瑰香 in 【紅玫瑰 白玫瑰】電影原聲帶 (1994). 快樂的壞東西, 給等最久的人 in 不必在乎我是誰 (1993). 生生世世 and 當真就好 (Duet with 張國榮) in 生生世世 (1995).
- Shawn De Mello: Moment Of Weakness (1991, BMG).
- Shayna Toh: EP (2014).
- Shino Lin 林曉培: 娃娃愛天下 (Trance Mix) in 有你的快樂 (2001, Avex).
- Steven Hao 郝劭文: 四歲 (1993, Rock).
- Sylvester Sim 沈祥龍: 起飛 (2005, Sony).
- Tarcy Su 蘇慧倫 and Rock: O2, 不知不覺 in 傻瓜 (1997), 釀愛 in Lemon Tree (1996). Wish You Well, 太怕寂寞, 快樂的分手, 滿足, 被愛是鑽石 in 滿足 (1995).
- Taufik Batisah: Backup Against The Wall in Blessings (2005, Sony).
- Various Artistes: 不見別的心, 熄緣 in 酔拳二 Soundtrack (1994, Rock). 春天的花蕊 (1996, Rock, reissue of 1994 Hokkien pop).
- Victor Huang 黃維德: 慢慢心死, 我就在這裡等你, 站在我後面,遊戲街頭, in 愛情鳥 (1996, Rock).
- Wallace Chung 钟汉良: 乐作人生 (2015).
- Wind Sea Fire 風火海: 自言自語, 快快快粉碎寂寞 in 風火海 (1994).
- Winnie Hsin 辛曉琪: 感動, 承認 in 辛曉琪 每個女人 (1998, Rock). 女人何苦爲難女人 (1997, Rock). 愛上他, 不只是我的錯, 看穿, in 愛上他, 不只是我的錯 (1996, Rock). I Don't Know How To Love Him, Love You Now in Winter Light (1995). 美麗的愛情汽球, 跟隨你, 非你不等, 忘川 in 遺忘 (1995). 領悟 (1994, Rock).
- Wong He 王喜: 仍是這首歌, 流星, 走一步追一步(Dance Mix) in 王喜-喜新唱歌 (2001).
- X'Ho: Kites in Skin Deep (1994, Pony Canyon). Motorcycle Hero and Motorcycle Hero in Punkmonkhunk (1994).
- Yuki Hsu 徐懷鈺: Dub-I-Dub and 愛是 Easy Game in Yuki (1998, Rock). 向前衝 (1998, Rock).
- 偲菘偉菘: 噩夢, 就要回家, 情話, 愛你寶貝, 為我照顧她, 真愛是誰 in 玩耍 (1993, 王者之劍, Rock).
- 名洋: I'm So Lonely 我的愛, 何必再心庝你而受傷, 何必再心庝你而受傷 in 名洋 (1991, 風格).
- 周葆元: Close Your Eyes, 停停走走 in 愛你愛得沒有理由 (1995).
- 唐文龍: 在乎 and 誰是愛我的人 in 你知道你對我多重要 (1995, 波麗佳音).
- 小松小柏: Baby You Should Be Dancing, Don't Stop Loving Me, 讓心情太陽一下 in Baby You Should Be Dancing (1990).
- 巫奇: 爸爸 (2015). 专一 (1996, Rock). 妳怎麼沒看見 (1996, Rock). 不顧一切 (1995).
- 李宗盛 & 郑惠玉: 当爱擦身而过 in 唱作剧佳 (1996, Rock).
- Li Du: 放手去愛 in 夠了 (1997, Rock).
- 林淑娟: 放手去愛, 這樣愛我還不夠, 這一場游戲規矩, 我不要快式的戀情, 別説抱歉, 朋友笑一個, 時空界限, 來不及, 年輕的色彩, 如果心有一把鎖, 頸握你的心 in 金曲 Vol. 10-19 (1990, Rock).
- 林琮巄: 過去 in Sayonara (1993).
- 楊全蓮: 揮出激情 (1987).
- 温雅: 梦想没有那么辽远 (2015).
- 溫嵐: 愛的后冠 in Landing (2013, Seed Music).
- 無印良品: 珍重 (1999, Rock). 3人行 (1999, Rock).
- 王德江: 殘缺 (2015, Seed Music)
- Wang Shih-hsien: 愛著一個無情的人 in 啊!傷心的話 (1995, Rock).
- 竇智孔: Cool Eyes (1998, Rock).
- 符杰荣: 付出 in Tonight (2014, Ocean Butterflies).
- 蔡榮祖: 留你的人留不住你 in 忽略 (1995).
- 藍心湄: 紫色舞 (1990).
- 郭子: 這樣對我最好 (1997, Rock), 回郭輯 (1996).
- 錦繡二重唱: 情比姐妹深 (1998, Rock).
- 陳彼得: 万语千言 (2007, Astrogen).
- 黃心懋: What Are You Talking About, 我在等一個人, 謝謝你陪我苦 in I Feel Blue (1991, Rock).
