= F.I.R. (album) =

- F.I.R. cover

Studio album by F.I.R.
- Released: 23 May 2004
- Recorded: 2002–2004
- Genre: Mandopop, Alternative pop, pop rock, C-rock
- Length: 49:47
- Language: Mandarin
- Label: Warner Music Taiwan
- Producer: Ian Chen (陳建寧)

F.I.R. chronology
F.I.R. (2004)	Unlimited (2005)

F.I.R. (Chinese: 飛兒樂團 同名專輯) is Taiwanese Mandopop pop rock band F.I.R.'s (Chinese: 飛兒樂團) debut Mandarin studio album. It was released on 23 May 2004 by Warner Music Taiwan. The last track "Next Album Preview" vaguely announces that their second album Unlimited would have an electric rock track.

The album won Longest Charting Album and the track, "Lydia" won one of the Top 10 Songs of the Year at the 2005 HITO Radio Music Awards presented by Taiwanese radio station Hit FM.

The album was awarded one of the Top 10 Selling Mandarin Albums of the Year at the 2004 IFPI Hong Kong Album Sales Awards, presented by the Hong Kong branch of IFPI.

== Track listing ==
1. "尋夢之途..." (The Way to the Dream...) – 2′44″
2. "Fly Away" – 4′35″
3. "Lydia" – 3′57″
4. "流浪者之歌" (The Traveler's Song) – 4′00″
5. "我們的愛" (Our Love) – 4′45″
6. "光芒" (Flame) – 3′33″
7. "Lydia" - piano instrumental – 3′24″
8. "你的微笑" ("Your Smile) – 4′19″
9. "塔羅牌" (Tarot Cards) – 4′09″
10. "後樂園" (Hidden Eden) – 4′16″
11. "Revolution" – 4′05″
12. "You Make Me Want To Fall In Love" – 4′44″
13. "Next Album Preview" – 0′43″

== Charts ==
Release	Chart	Peak position
23 April 2004	G-music Top 20	1
23 April 2004	Hito board Top 10	1
