= F.I.R. =

Taiwanese pop rock band

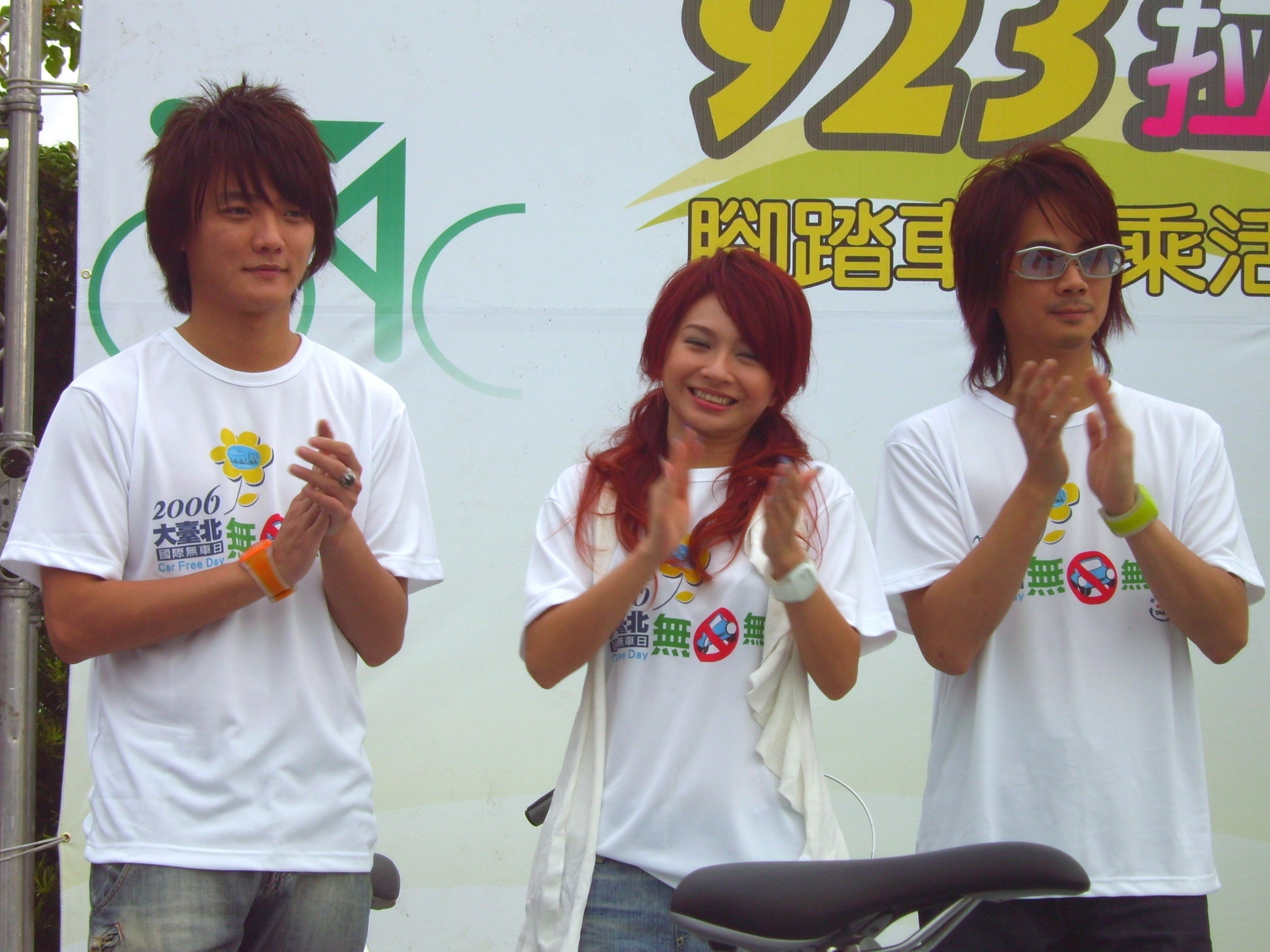
- F.I.R. in 2006; From left to right: Real Huang, Faye, Ian Chen

Background information
- Origin: Taipei, Taiwan
- Genres: Mandopop; pop rock; R&B
- Years active: 2004–present
- Labels: Warner Music Taiwan; HIM International Music
- Members: Ian Chen; Xiao Yu; Wu Yi
- Past members: Faye; Real Huang; Lydia

Chinese name
- Traditional Chinese: 飛兒樂團
- Simplified Chinese: 飞儿乐团
Transcriptions
Standard Mandarin
- Hanyu Pinyin: Fēiér Yuètuán

F.I.R. (traditional Chinese: 飛兒樂團; simplified Chinese: 飞儿乐团; pinyin: Fēiér Yuètuán) is a Taiwanese pop rock band formed in 2004. The group currently consists of Ian Chen, Xiao Yu and Wu Yi. Originally consisted of Faye, Ian & Real Huang, they are well known throughout Asia after their hit "Lydia", which gained popularity for being the theme song of Taiwanese TV drama, The Outsiders (鬥魚).

== Name ==
The name F.I.R. comes from the initials of the three original members: Faye, Ian, and Real. It is also a backronym for "Fairyland In Reality", their debut album name.

== History ==
In March 2018, it was announced that Faye would not be part of F.I.R. anymore – citing creative differences and in pursuit of a solo career. In October 2018, it was announced that then 22-year-old Lydia Han (also mononymously known as Lydia) would join the group, replacing Faye as its lead vocal. Lydia was constantly compared against Faye and was cyber-bullied. In December 2022, as a result of developing depression, Lydia indefinitely suspended her singing activities. Her recording contract also lapsed the following year.

In 2024, guitarist Real Huang announced his withdrawal from the band and became an independent producer. Band leader Ian Chen said that F.I.R. would go solo but would not disband.

In 2025, F.I.R. announced that the group would be holding their "Our Love Tour" in Malaysia. In addition to the only member Ian Chen, the group would be collaborating with Taiwanese music group Wǔ Dù Yǔ's (武渡羽) lead singer, Xiǎo Yǔ (小羽) and guitarist Xiǎo Wǔ (小武). They also emphasized that this group was "not the third generation of F.I.R."

== Members ==
Current members

- Ian Chen (2004–present) – Keyboards, guitars, occasional backing vocals
- Xiao Yu (2024–present) – Lead vocals
- Wu Yi (2024–present) – Guitars

Former members

- Faye (2004–2018) – Lead vocals
- Lydia (2018–2023) – Lead vocals
- Real Huang (2004–2023) – Keyboards, guitars, occasional backing vocals, producer

== Discography ==
=== Studio albums ===
List of studio albums, showing selected details, selected chart positions, and sales
| Title | Details | Peak chart positions | | Sales |
| Title | Details | TWN | SGP | Sales |
|---|---|---|---|---|
| F.I.R. (飛兒樂團 同名專輯) | Released: April 13, 2004; Label: Warner Music Taiwan; Formats: CD, digital download, cassette | 1 | 2 | Asia: 2,000,000; TWN: 300,000 |
| Unlimited (無限) | Released: April 8, 2005; Label: Warner Music Taiwan; Formats: CD, digital download, cassette | 1 | 2 | Asia: 2,000,000; TWN: 150,000 |
| Flight Tribe (飛行部落) | Released: July 28, 2006; Label: Warner Music Taiwan; Formats: CD, digital download, streaming | 1 | — | |
| Love, Diva (愛‧歌姬) | Released: September 28, 2007; Label: Warner Music Taiwan; Formats: CD, digital download, streaming | 2 | — | |
| Let's Smile (讓我們一起微笑吧) | Released: December 25, 2009; Label: Warner Music Taiwan; Formats: CD, digital download, streaming | 1 | — | |
| Atlantis (亞特蘭提斯) | Released: April 15, 2011; Label: Warner Music Taiwan; Formats: CD, digital download, streaming | 1 | — | |
| Better Life | Released: December 13, 2013; Label: Warner Music Taiwan; Formats: CD, digital download, streaming | 2 | — | |
| Re:Youth (末日青春:补完计划) | Released: May 10, 2019; Label: HIM International; Formats: CD, digital download, streaming | — | — | |
| Diamond Heart (鑽石之心) | Released: July 20, 2021; Label: HIM International; Formats: CD, digital download, streaming | — | — | |
"—" denotes releases that did not chart or were not released in that region.

=== Video albums ===
List of video albums, showing selected details
| Title | Details |
|---|---|
| I Want to Fly – Path to Dream All Record | Released: September 17, 2004; Label: Warner Music Taiwan; Formats: CD, VCD, DVD, digital download |
| Glory Days – Anniversary | Released: June 30, 2005; Label: Warner Music Taiwan; Formats: CD, DVD, digital download |

== Awards and nominations ==
2004
| Award | Category | Nomination | Result | Ref. |
|---|---|---|---|---|
| TVB8 Hong Kong | Best New Artist | F.I.R | Won | |
| 933 Golden Melody Award Singapore | Best New Artist | F.I.R | Won | |
| Global Mandarin Single Charts | Most Popular Group | F.I.R | Won | |
| Global Mandarin Single Charts | Best New Artist | F.I.R | Won | |
| Global Mandarin Single Charts | Best Golden Tune | | Won | |
| Metro Broadcast Hong Kong | Best New Artist | F.I.R | Won | |
| Metro Broadcast Hong Kong | Best Mandarin Group | F.I.R | Won | |
| Hong Kong Radio | Best New Artist | F.I.R | Won | |
| 11th Chinese Top 20, Channel V Asia | Best Single | "我們的愛" (Our Love) | Won | |
| 12th Chinese Single Chart, Beijing Music Station China | Most Popular Group of Hong Kong and Taiwan | F.I.R | Won | |
| 12th Chinese Single Chart, Beijing Music Station China | Most Popular single of Hong Kong and Taiwan | "我們的愛" (Our Love) | Won | |
| Minsheng Daily, Taiwan | Best New Idol Award | F.I.R | Won | |
| China Times Weekly, Taiwan | Best New Artist | F.I.R | Won | |
| Chinese Top 20- Channel V Asia | Best New Artist | F.I.R | Won | |
| Chinese Top 20- Channel V Asia | Best Single | | Won | |
| IFPI Hong Kong Album Sales Awards | Top 10 Selling Mandarin Albums of the Year | F.I.R.-Fairyland in Reality | Won | |

2005
| Award | Category | Nomination | Result | Ref. |
|---|---|---|---|---|
| East Radio Music Charts, Shanghai China | Best Group | F.I.R | Won | |
| Pepsi Music Awards | Best Group | F.I.R | Won | |
| Pepsi Music Awards | Best Composition | | Won | |
| Pepsi Music Awards | Best Songwriter | | Won | |
| Pepsi Music Awards | Best Single | | Won | |
| Pepsi Music Awards | Top Ten Single of Hong Kong and Taiwan | | Won | |
| 16th Golden Melody Awards, Taiwan | Best New Artist | F.I.R | Won | |
| IFPI Hong Kong Album Sales Awards | Top 10 Selling Mandarin Albums of the Year | Unlimited | Won | |
| HITO Radio Music Awards | Top 10 Songs of the Year | "Lydia" | Won | |
| HITO Radio Music Awards | Longest Charting Album | F.I.R.-Fairyland in Reality (19 weeks) | Won | |
| HITO Radio Music Awards | Best New Artist | F.I.R | Won | |

2006
| Award | Category | Nomination | Result | Ref. |
|---|---|---|---|---|
| Annual Mandarin Single: KK Box | Best Single | | Won | |
| Annual Mandarin Single: KK Box | Best Group | F.I.R | Won | |
| Mandarin Golden Melody TVBS | Most Popular Group | F.I.R | Won | |
| Mandarin Golden Melody TVBS | Best Album | | Won | |
| Mandarin Golden Melody TVBS | Best Composition | | Won | |

2007
| Award | Category | Nomination | Result | Ref. |
|---|---|---|---|---|
| 7th Global Chinese Music Awards | Most Popular Group | F.I.R | Won | |
| 7th Global Chinese Music Awards | 20 Most Popular Singles | "飞行部落" | Won | |
| HITO Radio Music Awards | Best Band | F.I.R | Won | |

2008
| Award | Category | Nomination | Result | Ref. |
|---|---|---|---|---|
| Vigor Stars Awards | Most Popular Group (Taiwan) | F.I.R | Won | |
| Vigor Stars Awards | Best Stage Presence | F.I.R | Won | |
| Vigor Stars Awards | Best Chinese Single | "月牙灣" | Won | |
