= Play (Jolin Tsai album) =

2014 studio album by Jolin Tsai

- Standard edition cover

Studio album by Jolin Tsai
- Released: November 15, 2014
- Genre: Pop
- Length: 36:26
- Labels: Warner; Eternal
- Producers: Starr Chen; Andrew Chen; Tiger Chung; JJ Lin; Michael Lin

Jolin Tsai chronology
Myself World Tour (2013)	Play (2014)	Play World Tour (2018)

Singles from Play
- 1. "Play" Released: October 27, 2014; 2. "The Third Person and I" Released: November 10, 2014

Play (Chinese: 呸) is the thirteenth studio album by Taiwanese singer Jolin Tsai, released on November 15, 2014, by Warner. The album features a rich variety of musical styles and covers diverse themes, with production by Starr Chen, Andrew Chen, Tiger Chung, JJ Lin, and Michael Lin.

In Taiwan, the album sold over 85,000 copies, making it the fourth best-selling album of 2014 and the top-selling album by a female artist that year. Play received ten nominations at the Golden Melody Awards, becoming one of the most-nominated albums in the award's history. It ultimately won Best Mandarin Album and Best Vocal Recording Album, while Andrew Chen earned the Best Single Producer Award for his work on the track "Lip Reading".

Following the album's release, Tsai launched her fifth concert tour, the Play World Tour, which began on May 22, 2015, in Taipei, Taiwan, and concluded on July 16, 2016, in Kuala Lumpur, Malaysia.

== Background and development ==
On April 13, 2013, Tsai revealed that she had begun preparations for a new album. On July 25, 2013, she traveled to London for a month-long training program focused on music, dance, and performance. On November 22, 2013, she shared that the album was still in the song selection phase. On January 29, 2014, media reports indicated that Tsai would take full creative control of the album's production, with potential for international collaborations. The production budget was reported to exceed NT$50 million.

On April 4, 2014, it was reported that the album was expected to be released in the summer and might include tracks co-written by Tsai herself. By June 10, 2014, she had already recorded three songs for the album, but decided to re-record them in search of better interpretation. On September 5, 2014, Tsai announced that the album was nearing completion and scheduled for release by the end of the year.

== Writing and production ==
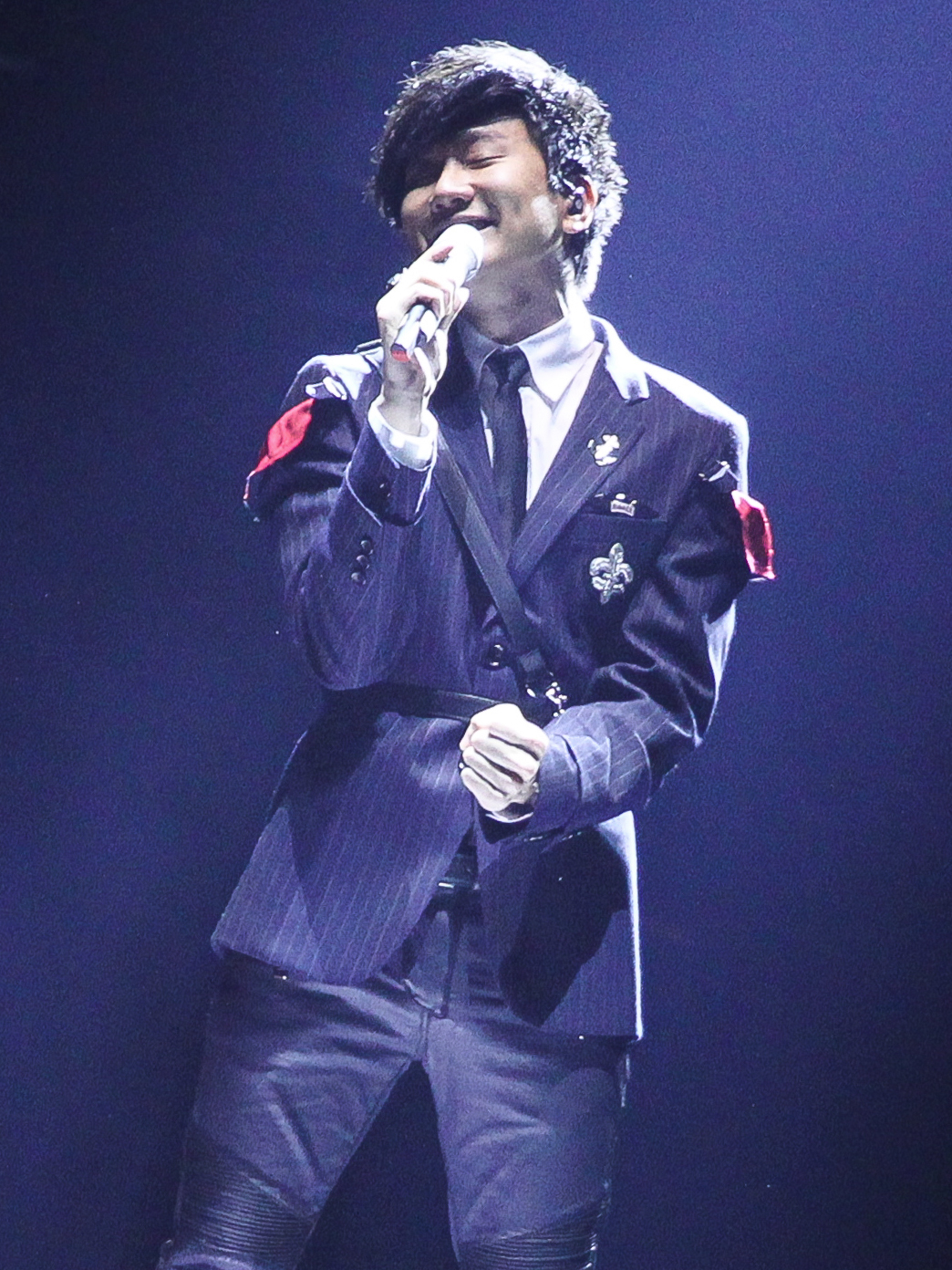
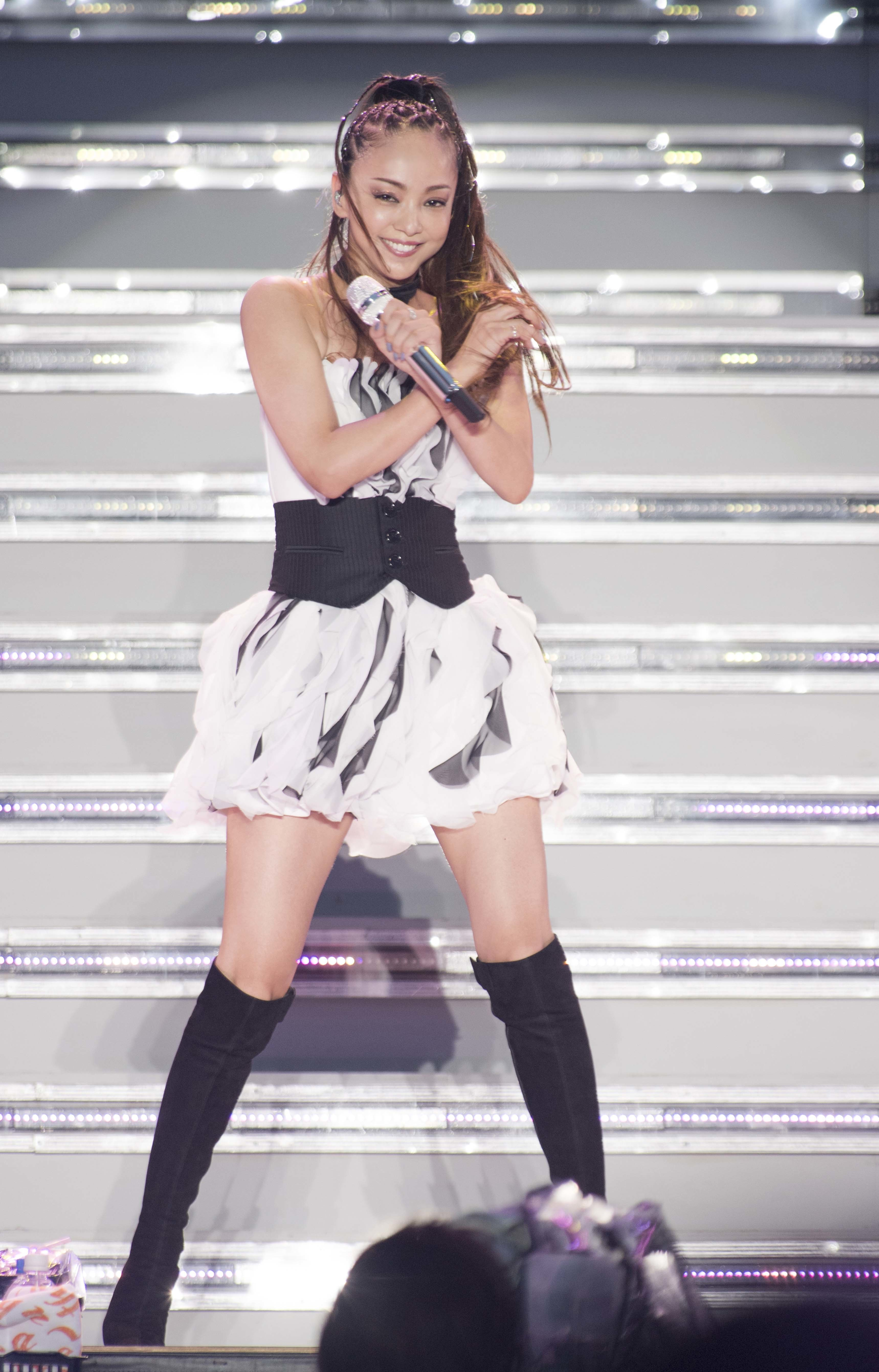
JJ Lin (left) and Namie Amuro (right), two collaborators on the album

The lead single, "Play", features lyrics that humorously reflect the absurd yet all-too-real aspects of modern life, encouraging listeners to find joy amid the chaos. The second single, "The Third Person and I", explores how people often cope with hardship by emotionally distancing themselves, pretending it has nothing to do with them. "Medusa" was the most time-consuming production on the album. It took two years of licensing negotiations and rearrangements to complete, blending dance-pop with trap music. "We're All Different, Yet the Same" is rooted in R&B and addresses themes of diverse families and marriage equality. Inspired by a true story, lyricist Albert Leung noted that love should be a right, not merely an abstract belief. "Gentlewomen" fuses noise rock with alternative dance music. Inspired by Simone de Beauvoir's book The Second Sex, the lyrics use "one" and "zero" to symbolize the power of femininity.

"Lip Reading" was inspired by Marilyn Monroe and incorporates trip-hop beats with theatrical elements, conveying the nuanced emotional world of women. "I'm Not Yours" is a collaboration between Tsai and Namie Amuro, blending electronic dance with elements of dubstep. "I Love, I Embrace" is a soft rock track that encourages self-acceptance and fearlessness in the face of judgment. "Phony Queen" served as the theme for the online game We Dancing Online DX and combines house music with satirical lyrics that comment on society's growing obsession with mobile phones. "Miss Trouble" fuses opera with trap music, featuring Tsai performing coloratura soprano vocals in a humorous portrayal of modern internet culture.

== Title and artwork ==
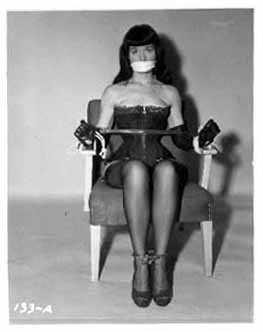
The album's standard cover art was inspired by Bettie Page.

The album title Play carries multiple meanings such as script, performance, and role-playing. Tsai explained that the title reflects her recent insights about life—she sees life as a grand stage where, although we can't choose the roles we're born into, we can rewrite our stories through effort and resilience.

The "Actress Edition", one of the album's pre-order versions, features Tsai on the cover wearing a sheer red ombré trench coat by The Blonds, paired with voluminous golden curls. The accompanying photo booklet also showcases pieces from the same designer, and the visuals were shot by Marko Krunic, emphasizing a dramatic, theatrical aesthetic. In the "Medusa Edition", Tsai dons a custom-made Medusa-inspired outfit by Versace—marking the first time Versace has tailored a design for an Asian artist. The cover and booklet images were shot by Wing Shya and CK Chan, respectively.

The standard edition's cover and photo booklet were photographed by renowned visual artist Chen Man, with fashion direction by stylist Wyman Wong. The photo themes include "Sexy Playful Child", "Angry Good Girl", and "Vintage Lady Spy". Outfits featured include an oversized suit by Comme des Garçons, a deep green embroidered tulle gown by Valentino, and a black leather maxi skirt by Lanvin. The packaging, designed by Aaron Nieh, embraces a minimalist style with a bold all-black background and stylized typography. The album's booklet consists of six double-sided full-color posters. Additionally, the deluxe edition of the album features a new set of visuals, also shot by Chen Man with styling by Wyman Wong.

== Release and promotion ==
On October 17, 2014, Warner announced that Tsai's new album would be available for pre-order starting October 29, with an official release date set for November 15. On October 28, 2014, Tsai held a pre-order press conference in Taipei, where she revealed that the album would be released in two versions: the "Actress Edition" and the "Medusa Edition". She also announced the launch of an accompanying online reality series titled The Play Project. On November 10, 2014, she hosted an exclusive preview session for the new album in Taipei. On November 20, 2014, a press conference for the album was held in Beijing. Tsai then staged the Play Concert in Taipei on December 7, 2014. Later that month, on December 27, 2014, the five-episode reality series The Play Project premiered on YouTube. On February 6, 2015, Tsai released the deluxe edition of the album, which included nine additional music videos.

=== Singles ===
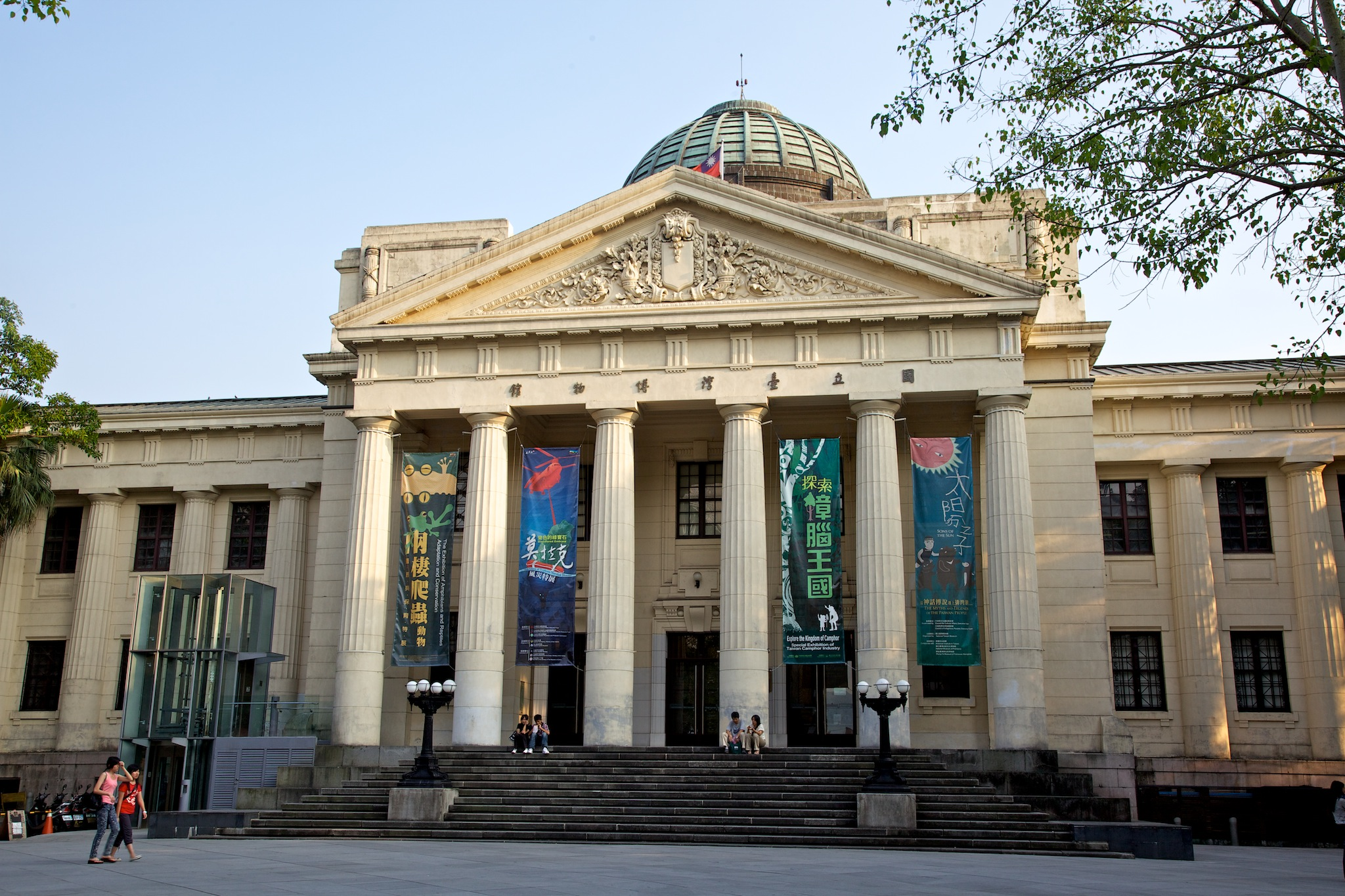
National Taiwan Museum, one of the filming locations for the music video of "Play"

On October 27, 2014, Tsai released the single "Play". The following day, she unveiled the lyric video for the song. On November 2, 2014, she premiered the official music video, accompanied by a promotional event held at the National Taiwan Museum in Taipei. Directed by Muh Chen, the video had a production budget exceeding NT$8 million. It topped the weekly charts on YinYueTai's V Chart and QQ Music's Mandarin music video chart and was ranked the most viewed music video on YouTube Taiwan for 2014. The video also received high praise from Time magazine in the U.S. and GQ magazine in Spain. On November 8, 2014, Tsai released a dance version of the music video.

On November 10, she released the single "The Third Person and I". Its music video, directed by Fu Tien-yu and featuring actress Carina Lau, premiered on November 13. This video also reached number one on YinYueTai's V Chart weekly rankings. Additionally, both "Play" and "The Third Person and I" ranked number one and number eight, respectively, on Taiwan's Hit FM Top 100 Singles of 2014, making Tsai one of the artists with the most number one hits on the chart.

=== Music videos ===
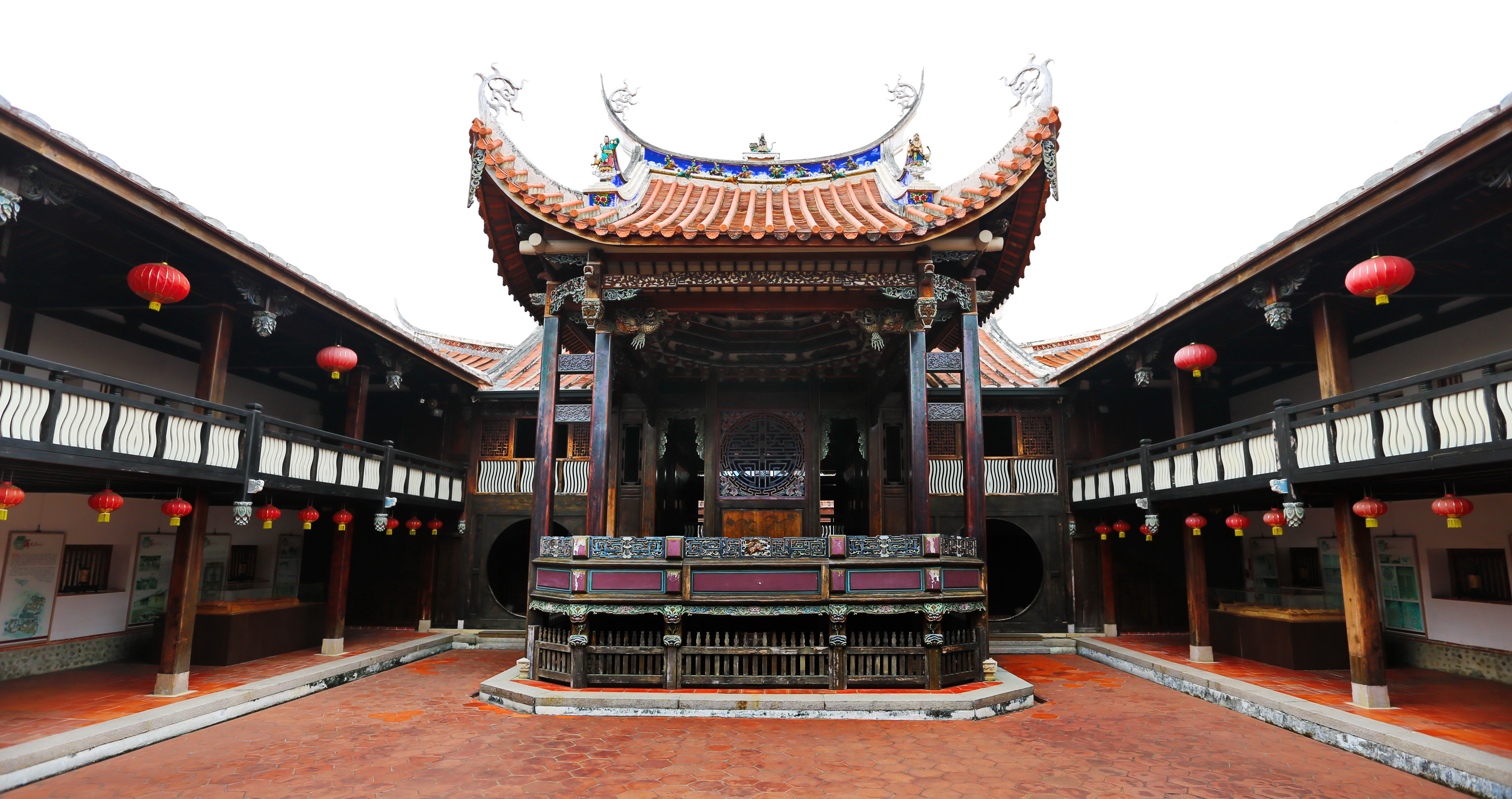
Wufeng Lin Family Mansion and Garden's Great Flower Hall, one of the filming locations for the music video of "I'm Not Yours"

On September 29, 2014, Tsai released the music video for the song "Phony Queen", directed by Jeff Chang, with a production budget exceeding NT$6 million. On October 30, 2014, she premiered the music video for "Medusa", directed by Jennifer Wu. On December 16, 2014, Tsai unveiled the music video for "We're All Different, Yet the Same", produced by Leste Chen and directed by Hou Chi-jan, featuring actors Grace Guei, Ruby Lin, and Bryan Chang. The video, inspired by a true story, explores themes of diverse families and marriage equality, receiving international media coverage from El País (Spain), Gay Star News (UK), and AfterEllen (USA). On December 30, 2014, the music video for "Gentlewomen", co-directed by Scott Beardslee and Kitt Lin, was released.

On January 20, 2015, Tsai released the music video for "Lip Reading", co-directed by Thomas Wyatt and Edwin Eversole. On February 3, 2015, she released the music video for "I'm Not Yours", directed by Muh Chen and starring Namie Amuro. The storyline was adapted from the Tang dynasty literary work Third Lady of Plank Bridge Inn by Xue Yusi, and the video was filmed at the Wufeng Lin Family Mansion and Garden in Taichung. This video ranked sixth on Taiwan's 2015 YouTube most-viewed music video chart. On February 6, 2015, Tsai released the music video for "I Love, I Embrace", also directed by Thomas Wyatt and Edwin Eversole. The music video for "Miss Trouble", directed by Michael Sun, was reportedly shelved due to the singer's dissatisfaction with the final outcome.

=== Live performances ===
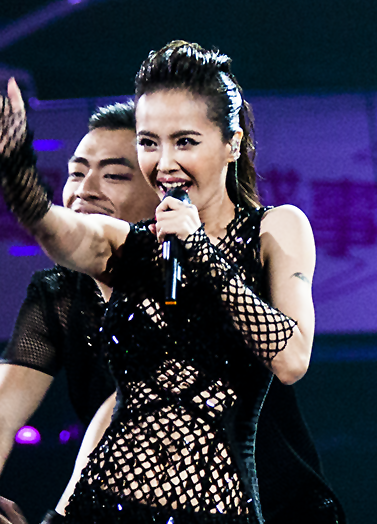
Tsai performing "Phony Queen" at the 2015 Hito Music Awards, May 2015

On November 22, 2014, Tsai participated in the recording of the CCTV variety show Global Chinese Music and performed the songs "Medusa" and "The Third Person and I". On December 20, 2014, she appeared on the TVB variety show The Voice 4, where she performed the song "Play". On December 31, 2014, Tsai participated in the New Year's Eve Concert organized by CTS, where she performed "Medusa", "The Third Person and I", "We're All Different, Yet the Same", and "Play". On February 8, 2015, Tsai attended the 10th KKBox Music Awards, where she performed "I'm Not Yours", "Medusa", and "Play". On February 12, 2015, she took part in the CCTV Web New Year's Gala, where she performed "Phone Queen" and "I'm Not Yours".

On March 25, 2015, Tsai performed at the 2015 QQ Music Awards, singing "The Third Person and I", "We're All Different, Yet the Same", "I'm Not Yours", and "Play". On May 31, 2015, she appeared at the 2015 Hito Music Awards, where she performed "I'm Not Yours", "Phone Queen", and "Play". On November 10, 2015, she participated in the Tmall Double 11 Carnival Night, where she performed "Medusa" and "I'm Not Yours". On December 2, 2015, Tsai performed at the 2015 Mnet Asian Music Awards, where she sang "Play". On December 31, 2015, she took part in the New Year's Eve Concert hosted by Jiangsu TV, where she performed "I'm Not Yours" and "Play".

=== Touring ===
On October 29, 2014, Tsai revealed plans to begin preparing a new concert tour following the release of her album, emphasizing that the upcoming tour would place greater focus on the musical experience. On February 15, 2015, she officially announced that the Play World Tour would kick off on May 22, 2015 at the Taipei Arena in Taipei, Taiwan. The tour was produced in collaboration with Live Nation and co-directed by Travis Payne and Stacy Walker. The tour concluded on July 16, 2016, at the Stadium Merdeka in Kuala Lumpur, Malaysia. Spanning one year and two months, the Play World Tour visited 23 cities worldwide, staging 34 shows and drawing an audience of over 600,000, with total ticket sales surpassing NT$1.5 billion.

== Commercial performance ==
The album achieved the number one position on the weekly sales charts of major Taiwanese retailers, including Pok'elai, Eslite, Kuang Nan, Chia Chia, G-Music, and Five Music. It also topped the sales charts on YesAsia and Singapore's HMV. By December 31, 2014, the album had sold over 63,837 copies in Taiwan, ranking fourth overall on Taiwan's annual album sales chart and first among female artists. In the same year, it placed third, fifth, third, and third respectively on the annual sales charts of Pok'elai, Kuang Nan, G-Music, and Five Music. In 2015, the album continued to perform strongly, ranking tenth and fifteenth on the annual sales charts of Kuang Nan and Five Music, respectively.

== Critical reception ==
Professional ratings
Review scores
Source	Rating
Freshmusic	9/10
PlayMusic	4.5/5 stars
Today	3.5/5 stars

The Golden Melody Awards judges praised the album for its exceptionally high recording quality and rich auditory experience, calling it a new milestone in Tsai's singing career. They highlighted her exploration of new musical directions and the success of both the visual and auditory elements. Bloomberg Businessweek dubbed Tsai the "Great Chinese Dance Music Artist", praising her role in introducing world-class Chinese dance music to an international audience. Hou Cheng-nan, Associate Professor of Mass Communication at I-Shou University, noted that Tsai elevated the stature of Chinese dance music, setting an almost insurmountable standard. DJ Mykal commented that Tsai's artistic experimentation would significantly influence the general audience, while musician Eazie Huang praised the album's sophisticated arrangements and mixing as reaching a new level. Songwriter Adam Hsu remarked that Tsai has begun to explore new worlds through her music.

Freshmusic magazine regarded the album as a benchmark of the 2014 Chinese music scene and a testament to Tsai's return to her artistic peak. PlayMusic praised the album for breaking the boundaries of pop music and adding new depth and breadth to Mandarin music, calling it a successful establishment of a new high standard. Singapore's Today newspaper described the album as a finely crafted electropop record. United Daily News noted that the album sets a high bar for Taiwanese dance-pop singers, demonstrating Tsai's meticulousness and artistic integrity. Tencent Entertainment lauded the album's unique and exquisite arrangements, equating its production quality to international releases. Tencent Music's Wave Committee ranked it ninth among the best Mandarin albums of 2010–2020, stating it marked a major transformation in Tsai's career by breaking barriers between mainstream and indie music and expanding the boundaries of Chinese dance music.

== Accolades ==
On February 8, 2015, Tsai was awarded the Top 10 Singers at the 10th KKBox Music Awards. On March 25, 2015, the album won Best Mandarin Album at the QQ Music Awards, and Tsai received the titles of Best Taiwanese Female Singer and Most Popular Hong Kong/Taiwan Female Singer. On April 11, 2015, the album won the Best Hong Kong/Taiwan Album at the 3rd V Chart Awards, with Tsai receiving the Best Female Singer. On May 15, 2015, the album was named Best Album at the 5th Global Chinese Golden Chart Awards, while the song "The Third Person and I" ranked among the Top 20 Songs of the Year, and "Play" claimed the Hit FM's Top Song of the Tear.

On May 18, 2015, the album was nominated for nine awards at the 26th Golden Melody Awards, the highest number of nominations for any album that year. The album was nominated for Best Mandarin Album and Best Vocal Recording Album, while the song "Play" was nominated for Song of the Year. The music videos for "Play" and "We're All Different, Yet the Same" were nominated for Best Music Video. Alex Ni and Starr Chen received nominations for Best Music Arrangement for "Play". Starr Chen and Andrew Chen were nominated for Best Single Producer for "Play" and "Lip Reading", respectively. Aaron Nieh received a nomination for Best Album Design for the album. On May 31, 2015, the album won the Hito Music Awards' Top Album, while "Play" was awarded both the Top 10 Mandarin Songs and Hit FM's Top Song of 2014. Tsai also won the Top Female Singer. On June 10, 2015, "Play" was named one of the Top 10 Songs of the Year by the Chinese Musicians Exchange Association. On June 20, 2015, the album won one of the Top 10 Albums of the Year at the 8th Freshmusic Awards, and "Play" also received the Top 10 Songs of the Year.

On June 27, 2015, the album won three awards at the 26th Golden Melody Awards, making it the most awarded album that year. The album received the Best Mandarin Album and Best Vocal Recording Album awards, while Andrew Chen won Best Single Producer for "Lip Reading". On August 23, 2015, Tsai was named Most Popular Female Singer at the Music Radio China Top Chart Awards, and "The Third Person and I" won the Top Hong Kong/Taiwan Songs of the Year. On September 15, 2015, Tsai was nominated for Best Taiwanese Act at the 2015 MTV Europe Music Awards. On November 6, 2015, Tsai won the Most Popular Female Singer and Top 5 Most Popular Female Singer at the 15th Global Chinese Music Awards, while "Phony Queen" was named one of the Top 20 Songs of the Year.

On December 2, 2015, Tsai received the Best Asian Artist at the 2015 Mnet Asian Music Awards. On December 16, 2015, Tsai was named Best Dance Music Artist at the 16th Chinese Music Media Awards. On May 13, 2016, the music video for "I'm Not Yours" was nominated for Best Music Video at the 27th Golden Melody Awards. Overall, the album received a total of 10 Golden Melody Award nominations, tying the record held by Jay Chou's Fantasy (2001) and A-Mei's Amit (2009) for the most nominations in the history of the awards, making it one of the most nominated albums of all time.

== Track listing ==
Play – Standard / Replay Deluxe International edition
No.	Title	Lyrics	Music	Producer(s)	Length
1.	"Gentlewomen" (第二性)	Cheer Chen	Cheer Chen	Tiger Chung	3:39
2.	"Play" (Play我呸)	Katie Lee	Alex Ni	Starr Chen	3:13
3.	"Medusa" (美杜莎)	Matthew Yen	Emile Ghantous; Erik Nelson; Nasri Atweh; Lakesha Hinton	Andrew Chen	4:04
4.	"Lip Reading" (唇語)	Neoh Kim Hin	Ooi Teng Fong	Andrew Chen	3:39
5.	"I'm Not Yours"	Wyman Wong	Jolin Tsai; Hayley Aitken; Olof Lindskog; Iggy Strange Dahl	Starr Chen	3:41
6.	"I Love, I Embrace" (自愛自受)	Derek Shih	William Wei	Tiger Chung	3:55
7.	"Miss Trouble"	David Ke	Jolin Tsai; Hayley Aitken; Olof Lindskog; Iggy Strange Dahl	Starr Chen	3:13
8.	"Phony Queen" (電話皇后)	Wyman Wong	Dominik Rothert; Jason Worthy; Jessica Jean Pfeiffer; Alexander Krause	Andrew Chen	2:58
9.	"The Third Person and I" (第三人稱)	Tom Wang	JJ Lin	JJ Lin	4:46
10.	"We're All Different, Yet the Same" (不一樣又怎樣)	Albert Leung	Christoffer Vikberg; Hayley Aitken; Iggy Strange Dahl; Johan Moraeus	Starr Chen; Michael Lin	3:18
Total length:					36:26

Play – Replay Deluxe International edition (DVD)
No.	Title	Length
1.	"Play" (music video)	3:21
2.	"The Third Person and I" (music video)	5:30
3.	"Medusa" (music video)	4:06
4.	"We're All Different, Yet the Same" (music video)	4:14
5.	"Gentlewomen" (music video)	3:56
6.	"Phony Queen" (music video)	3:27
7.	"Lip Reading" (music video)	3:53
8.	"I Love, I Embrace" (music video)	3:54
9.	"I'm Not Yours" (music video)	5:12
Total length:		37:33

== Personnel ==
Song #1

- Gibson Chou – assistant producer
- Thomas Tsai – additional program dubbing
- Peggy Hsu – backing vocals arrangement
- Tiger Chung – guitar, recording engineer
- Kenny Fan – mixing engineer

Song #2

- Starr Chen – backing vocals arrangement
- Jolin Tsai – backing vocals
- AJ Chen – recording engineer
- Jaycen Joshua – mixing engineer
- Ryan Kaul – mixing assistant engineer
- Maddox Chimm – mixing assistant engineer

Song #3

- Ooi Teng Fong – assistant producer
- Andrew Chen – backing vocals arrangement
- Jolin Tsai – backing vocals
- Yeh Yu-hsuan – recording engineer
- Jaycen Joshua – mixing engineer
- Ryan Kaul – mixing assistant engineer
- Maddox Chimm – mixing assistant engineer

Song #4

- Ooi Teng Fong – assistant producer, recording engineer
- Lin Yu-hsien – piano
- Andrew Chen – rhythm arrangement, electric guitar
- Li Qi – strings director supervisor, strings arrangement
- Hu Jingcheng – strings arrangement
- Li Qi String Orchestra – strings
- Zhang Hao – concertmaster
- Yeh Yu-hsuan – recording engineer
- Zhao Huitao – recording engineer
- Dan Grech-Marguerat – mixing engineer

Song #5

- Jolin Tsai – backing vocals
- Namie Amuro – backing vocals
- Hayley Aitken – backing vocals
- AJ Chen – recording engineer
- Jaycen Joshua – mixing engineer
- Ryan Kaul – mixing assistant engineer
- Maddox Chimm – mixing assistant engineer

Song #6

- Gibson Chou – assistant producer, recording engineer
- Peggy Hsu – backing vocals arrangement
- JerryC – guitar
- Lin I-wen – bass guitar
- Tiger Chung – recording engineer
- Kenny Fan – mixing engineer

Song #7

- Chen Hsin-ying – opera vocals
- Christine Liu – backing vocals arrangement, backing vocals
- Stanley Huang – backing vocals arrangement
- Jolin Tsai – backing vocals
- Hayley Aitken – backing vocals
- AJ Chen – recording engineer
- Jaycen Joshua – mixing engineer
- Ryan Kaul – mixing assistant engineer
- Maddox Chimm – mixing assistant engineer

Song #8

- Ooi Teng Fong – assistant producer, recording engineer
- Andrew Chen – backing vocals arrangement, backing vocals
- Jolin Tsai – backing vocals
- Jaycen Joshua – mixing engineer
- Ryan Kaul – mixing assistant engineer
- Maddox Chimm – mixing assistant engineer

Song #9

- JJ Lin – vocal producer
- Shin Chou – production coordinator, recording engineer
- Christine Chien – backing vocals arrangement, backing vocals
- Kenn C – guitar, keyboard
- Joshua Lee – recording engineer
- Jerry Lin – mixing engineer

Song #10

- Michael Lin – vocal producer, recording engineer
- Jolin Tsai – backing vocals
- AJ Chen – recording engineer
- Jaycen Joshua – mixing engineer
- Ryan Kaul – mixing assistant engineer
- Maddox Chimm – mixing assistant engineer

Chris Gehringer – mastering engineer

== Release history ==
Region	Date	Format(s)	Edition(s)	Distributor
Various	November 15, 2014	Streaming; digital download	Standard	Eternal
Various	February 6, 2015	Streaming; digital download	Replay Deluxe International	Eternal
Taiwan	November 15, 2014	CD	Standard	Warner
Taiwan	February 6, 2015	CD+DVD	Replay Deluxe International	Warner
China	November 15, 2014	Streaming	Standard	YDX
China	March 16, 2015	CD	Standard	Starsing
