= Play World Tour (album) =

2018 live video album by Jolin Tsai

Live album by Jolin Tsai
- Released: January 30, 2018
- Recorded: May 22–25, 2015
- Venues: Taipei Arena (Taipei, Taiwan)
- Genre: Pop
- Length: 2:51:59
- Labels: Warner; Eternal

Jolin Tsai chronology
Play (2014)	Play World Tour (2018)	Ugly Beauty (2018)

Play World Tour (Chinese: Play世界巡迴演唱會) is a live video album by Taiwanese singer Jolin Tsai, released on January 30, 2018, by Warner. The album features footage from Tsai's Play World Tour performances held at the Taipei Arena from May 22 to 25, 2015. It also includes four short documentary films, as well as one behind-the-scenes feature. The album was released exclusively in physical format in Taiwan and went on to become the best-selling video album of 2018 in the country.

== Background and development ==
On May 22, 2015, Tsai kicked off her fourth concert tour, the Play World Tour, at the Taipei Arena in Taipei, Taiwan. On November 17, 2015, her official fan club revealed on Sina Weibo that the live footage for the tour had been completed. However, on September 30, 2016, while attending the International Music Summit in Shanghai, Tsai stated that a live video album of the tour would not be released at that time. Later, on December 4, 2016, during her appearance at the 10th Migu Music Awards, she shared that, in response to fans' enthusiastic requests, she would begin preparing the live video album, though the post-production process would require additional time.

On April 11, 2017, Tsai's studio revealed via Sina Weibo that the initial editing of the album had been completed. On October 30, 2017, Warner's Sam Chen announced on Facebook that the album was scheduled for release in December and would include a Blu-ray edition—the first Blu-ray release in Tsai's career. On December 12, 2017, media reports confirmed the album was expected to be released in January of the following year.

== Release and promotion ==
On December 23, 2017, Warner announced that the album would be available for pre-order starting January 3, 2018, with an official release date set for January 30. The album features Tsai's live performances from May 22 to 25, 2015, at the Taipei Arena during her Play World Tour, and includes four We're All Different, Yet the Same documentary shorts directed by Hou Chi-jan and Gavin Lin, as well as a behind-the-scenes feature. The concert film was directed by Leo Hsu, with post-production handled by 3 Aqua Entertainment. According to Warner, the production utilized 26 ground and aerial cameras and was meticulously edited from over 400 hours of raw footage. Tsai personally oversaw the post-production process three times to ensure quality.

On January 2, 2018, Tsai held a press conference at Lihpao Land in Taichung to promote the album. The event had a production budget of NT$5 million and was broadcast live using ten cameras. On January 28, 2018, she hosted the Double Play Fan Meeting at the Taipei International Convention Center, with an event budget of NT$2 million. The concert video premiered on Line TV on January 29 and was later made available on Migu Music and Tencent Video on February 6.

== Commercial performance ==
The album was released physically only in Taiwan and achieved the top position on the weekly video album sales charts of several major retailers, including Pok'elai, Eslite, Kuang Nan, Chia Chia, G-Music, Five Music, and PChome. It ranked first on the 2018 annual video album sales charts of Pok'elai, Kuang Nan, and Five Music. Additionally, it placed seventh on Chia Chia's annual chart and second on YesAsia's 2018 annual video album sales chart.

== Critical reception ==
PlayMusic regarded the album as another representative work of Tsai, noting that in terms of costumes, stage design, and choreography, she delivered a completely fresh presentation that fully showcased the high production quality of Mandopop, further raising anticipation for her future projects. The review also highlighted that the album successfully balanced both entertainment and musicality. In particular, it praised Tsai's significantly improved live vocal performance—whether performing upbeat or slow songs, her vocal expression, rhythm, and emotional delivery were more effortless than ever. The entire show also demonstrated a smoother and more cohesive approach to musical arrangement and reinterpretation.

== Track listing ==
The following is the track listing for the Blu-ray version, while the DVD version is divided into two discs, one for tracks 1 to 21 and one for tracks 22 to 34.

No.	Title	Lyrics	Music	Length
1.	"Medusa"	Matthew Yen	Emile Ghantous; Erik Nelson; Nasri Atweh; Lakesha Hinton	4:11
2.	"Real Man"	Issac Chen	Jonas Jeberg; Mikkel Sigvardt; Mich Hansen; Nina Woodford	3:20
3.	"Honey Trap"	Luke Tsui; Gino Chen	Danielle Senior; Scott Wild	4:03
4.	"Bravo Lover"	Issac Chen	Lina Rafn; Adam Powers; Paw Lagermann	3:03
5.	"I'm Not Yours" (feat. Namie Amuro)	Wyman Wong	Jolin Tsai; Hayley Aitken; Olof Lindskog; Iggy Strange Dahl	4:37
6.	"Agent J"	Sunny Lee; Matthew Yen; Neoh Kim Hin	Ooi Teng Fong	3:31
7.	"Butterfly"	Matthew Yen	Anders Kjer; David Clewett; Alice Gernandt	2:22
8.	"Love Love Love"	Simon Liang	Konstantin Meladze	2:49
9.	"Prague Square"	Vincent Fang	Jay Chou	1:52
10.	"The Third Person and I"	Tom Wang	JJ Lin	4:34
11.	"Exclusive Myth"	Issac Chen	Wang Leehom	4:23
12.	"The Great Artist"	Matthew Yen	Robin Jessen; Anne Judith Wik; Nermin Harambasic; Ronny Svendsen; Charite Viken Reinas; Eirik Johansen; Alexander Puntervold	5:42
13.	"Mr. Q"	Issac Chen	Miriam Nervo; Olivia Nervo; Ben Thomas; Dele Ladimeji	3:18
14.	"Lip Reading"	Neoh Kim Hin	Ooi Teng Fong	1:25
15.	"The Smell of Lemon Grass"	Francis Lee	Peter Lee	4:37
16.	"I Know You're Feeling Blue"	Kiki Hu	Jimmy Ye	2:07
17.	"Sky"	Wesley Chia; Kiki Hu	Wesley Chia	3:08
18.	"Butterflies in My Stomach"	Andrew Chen	Andrew Chen; Gino Chen	2:30
19.	"Miss Trouble"	David Ke	Jolin Tsai; Hayley Aitken; Olof Lindskog; Iggy Strange Dahl	2:16
20.	"Sun Will Never Set"	Luke Tsui	Alexander Bard; Anders Hansson	4:21
21.	"Nothing Left to Say"	Neoh Kim Hin	Ooi Teng Fong	3:52
22.	"Fantasy"	Greeny Wu	Mikko Tamminen; Udo Mechels; Rike Boomgaarden	3:29
23.	"36 Tricks of Love"	Kiki Hu	Savan Kotecha; Andrew Frampton; Wayne Wilkins	1:43
24.	"Phony Queen"	Wyman Wong	Dominik Rothert; Jason Worthy; Jessica Jean Pfeiffer; Alexander Krause	2:54
25.	"Dr. Jolin"	Peggy Hsu	Iggy Strange Dahl; Johan Moraeus; Christoffer Vikberg	3:46
26.	"Dancing Diva"	Issac Chen	Miriam Nervo; Olivia Nervo; Greg Kurstin	5:17
27.	"Magic"	Issac Chen	Edward Chan; Charles Lee	3:34
28.	"We're All Different, Yet the Same"	Albert Leung	Christoffer Vikberg; Hayley Aitken; Iggy Strange Dahl; Johan Moraeus	7:48
29.	"Play"	Katie Lee	Alex Ni	6:29
30.	"Behind the Scenes"			46:43
31.	"Story of Lin Hsin-pei" (We're All Different, Yet the Same documentary series)			4:03
32.	"Story of Tseng Ying-chi" (We're All Different, Yet the Same documentary series)			3:53
33.	"Story of Katherine Tseng" (We're All Different, Yet the Same documentary series)			5:26
34.	"Story of Yeh Yung-chih" (We're All Different, Yet the Same documentary series)			4:53
Total length:				2:51:59

== Personnel ==
Live Shooting Crew:

- 3 Aqua Entertainment Co. – post-production supervision
- Leo Hsu – executive production, direction
- Chenyeen Chen – supervisor
- Paul Kuo – video engineering supervision
- Ruya Cheng – assistant direction
- Jadee Li – assistant direction, production coordination
- Michelle Yang – assistant direction, production coordination
- Katie Lin – floor direction
- Jaguar Hung – floor direction
- Pao Lin – direction of photography, camera
- Chen Po-chuan – camera
- Liu Chun-hsin – camera
- Hu Yan-xun – camera
- Hime Li – production coordination
- Kate Lin – production coordination
- Mark Liu – production coordination
- Eva Chen – production administration
- Cindy Zhan – production administration
- Joan Lin – production administration
- Scott Lin – file management
- Noah's Ark Co. – equipment management
- Baishen Marketing Co. – GoPro camera

Behind the scenes:

- Leo Hsu – supervision, DVD/BD video production/edit
- Wen Chiu – behind the scenes filming supervision, behind the scenes camera
- Zhong Zhi-hong – behind the scenes camera
- Jiang Guo-ding – behind the scenes camera, Shanghai video engineering supervision
- Shanghai Top Solutions Advertising Co. – Shanghai equipment support
- Michelle Yang – executive production
- Li Li-rui – Japanese translation
- Mi Hsueh-er – English translation
- 3 Aqua Entertainment Co. – DVD/BD video/animation rendering, DVD/BD menu animation design
- Kuo Hsing-yi – DVD/BD menu animation design
- Katie Lin – DVD/BD visual effects
- Jadee Li – DVD/BD visual effects

Others:

- Ian Lee – production, programming editor engineering
- Cherry Guns Factory Co., Ltd. – live recording
- AJ Chen – programming editor engineering
- Mega Force Studio – programming editor studio
- Kenny Fan – mixing engineering
- Yohu Studio – mixing studio
- Sun Chung-shu – mastering
- U-Tech Media Co. – DVD/BD video/audio mastering

== Release history ==
Region	Date	Format(s)	Distributor
Various	January 30, 2018	Streaming; digital download	Eternal
Taiwan	January 30, 2018	Blu-ray	Warner
Taiwan	January 30, 2018	2DVD	Warner
