= Groupie (disambiguation) =

A groupie is a fan of a celebrity musician who follows them on tours.

Groupie or groupies may also refer to:

== Films ==
- Groupie (1993 film), directed by Nadav Levitan
- Groupie (2010 film), starring Taryn Manning

== Literature ==
- Groupie (1969), an autobiographical book by Jenny Fabian, co-written by Johnny Byrne

== Music ==
=== Albums ===
- Groupies (album), by Cheer Chen, 2002

=== Songs ===
- "Groupie" (Samir & Viktor song), 2015
- "Groupie (Superstar)", original title of the song better known as "Superstar" by Delaney and Bonnie, with versions recorded by many artists
- "Groupie", by New Riders of the Purple Sage from Gypsy Cowboy, 1972
- "Groupies", by Hard Boys from A-Town Hard Heads, 1992
- "Groupies", by rapper Future from DS2, 2015

=== Bands ===
- The Groupies (band), an American garage rock band

== See also ==
- Groupie Girl
