= Play (Jolin Tsai song) =

2014 single by Jolin Tsai

Single by Jolin Tsai

from the album Play
- Language: Mandarin
- Released: October 27, 2014
- Studio: Mega Force (New Taipei)
- Genre: Pop
- Length: 3:13
- Label: Warner; Eternal
- Composer: Nese
- Lyricist: Katie Lee
- Producer: Starr Chen

Jolin Tsai singles chronology
"Phony Queen" (2014)	"Play" (2014)	"The Third Person and I" (2014)

Music video
- "Play" on YouTube

"Play" (Chinese: Play我呸; pinyin: Wǒ pēi) is a song by Taiwanese singer Jolin Tsai, featured on her thirteenth studio album Play (2014). The track was written by Katie Lee and Nese, and produced by Starr Chen. It was released on October 27, 2014, by Warner as the lead single from Play.

The song and its music video were both nominated at the 26th Golden Melody Awards for Song of the Year and Best Music Video, respectively. Nese and Starr Chen received a nomination for Best Music Arrangement, while Starr Chen was also nominated for Best Single Producer.

== Background ==
On April 13, 2013, Tsai concluded her third concert tour, the Myself World Tour, and revealed that she had begun preparations for a new album. On July 25, 2013, she traveled to London, England, for a month-long program focused on music, dance, and performance training.

On November 22, 2013, Tsai stated that the album was still in the song selection stage and progressing slowly. On January 29, 2014, media reports indicated that she would take full creative control over the album's production, with potential international collaborations and a production budget exceeding NT$50 million.

By April 4, 2014, media sources suggested that the album was expected to be released during the summer and might include tracks co-written by Tsai herself. On September 5, 2014, she revealed that the album was nearly complete and scheduled for release by the end of the year.

== Composition ==
"Play"
"Play" depicts a satirical yet lighthearted view of modern life.

The lyrics of "Play" depict a satirical yet lighthearted view of modern life, illustrating how people find enjoyment amid the absurdities and contradictions of reality.

== Music video ==
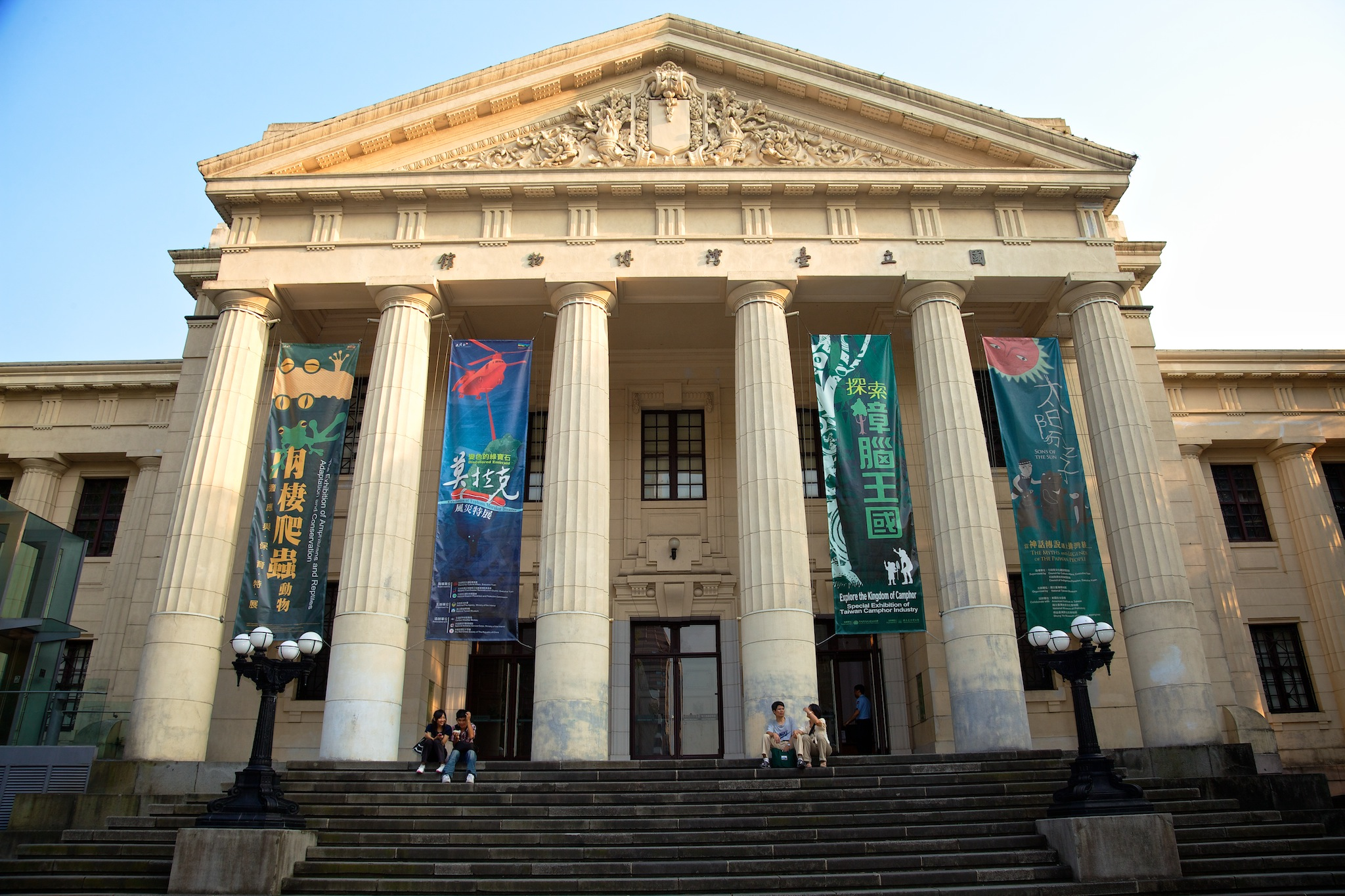
National Taiwan Museum, one of the filming locations for the music video of "Play"

On October 28, 2014, Tsai released the lyric video for "Play". Just days later, on November 2, she unveiled the official music video and held a promotional event at the National Taiwan Museum in Taipei. The video was directed by Muh Chen and had a production budget exceeding NT$8 million. On November 8, 2014, Tsai released a dance version of the music video.

The music video quickly rose to the top of major charts, securing the number one spot on both YinYueTai's V Chart and QQ Music's Mandopop music video weekly chart. It was also the most-viewed music video on YouTube in Taiwan for 2014.

The video received widespread acclaim from international media, including Time magazine and GQ Spain. It was nominated for Best Art Direction at the 2016 Berlin Music Video Awards, and it won the Visual Communication Design award at the 2015 Red Dot Design Awards, as well as the 2016 Golden Pin Design Award.

== Other version ==
"Play (Alesso Remix Version)"

Single by Jolin Tsai
- Released: October 2, 2016
- Genre: Dance
- Length: 3:47
- Label: Eternal

Jolin Tsai singles chronology
"I Wanna Know" (2016)	"Play (Alesso Remix Version)" (2016)	"Ego-Holic" (2016)

On October 2, 2016, Tsai released the remix version of "Play", reworked by Alesso.

== Commercial performance ==
On January 6, 2015, "Play" was ranked number one on Taiwan's Hit FM Top 100 Singles of 2014. With this achievement, Tsai became one of the two artists with the most number one entries in the chart's history.

== Critical reception ==
Taiwanese musician Adam Hsu praised the lyricist Katie Lee for delivering an outstanding performance in "Play", noting the song's high view count and international recognition. He highlighted how Tsai conveyed the message that "pop is synonymous with elimination"—suggesting that without phasing out the old, new trends cannot emerge. This idea, he argued, powerfully reinforces the deeper concept of the album, emphasizing the spirit of constant reinvention.

Taiwanese musician Eazie Huang identified "Play" as one of the year's most popular tracks. He noted that while electronic dance music was still in its early stages within Taiwanese pop, this song set a benchmark. Its arrangement is smooth, the sound design well-executed, and the melody both catchy and musically rich. The lyrics, he remarked, are soulful and sparked widespread resonance and discussion—making it an apt representation of the information-saturated, culturally diverse modern era.

Danial Chang, a music critic for PlayMusic, stated that the lyrics precisely capture contemporary attitudes, incorporating popular internet slang to both portray and satirize the roles people play in life. He noted that listeners are quickly drawn into the song's narrative, with down-to-earth wording that contains profound undertones. The playful harmonies and bursts of hearty laughter throughout the track suggest a tongue-in-cheek outlook on life—"laughing at life as one big play"—which aligns closely with the album's overarching theme.

Another PlayMusic critic, Chia Hsu, commended the song's excellence across the board—lyrics, melody, arrangement, vocals, production, and mixing—calling it both catchy and highly entertaining. He regarded it as one of the best Mandopop songs of 2014 and affirmed that its nomination for Song of the Year at the Golden Melody Awards was well-deserved.

Yen Fu-min of United Daily News reported that "Play", the lead single from the album Play (2014), featured lyrics penned by acclaimed poet Hsia Yu—an artistic decision that reflected the album's bold ambition. Hsia's lyrics, sharp and socially observant, moved the song away from typical dance-pop themes of love and instead offered commentary on social realities. Paired with Muh Chen's music video direction, which included satirical imagery of eye rolls, plastic surgery, and romantic entanglements, the video ultimately returns to social critique. Yen described it as one of the rare high-caliber music videos in Taiwanese pop in recent years.

== Accolades ==
On May 15, 2015, "Play" won the Hit FM Most Played Song at the 5th Global Chinese Golden Chart Awards. Just days later, on May 18, 2015, it was nominated for Song of the Year at the 26th Golden Melody Awards. Its music video also received a nomination for Best Music Video, while Nese and Starr Chen were nominated for Best Music Arrangement, and Starr Chen earned an additional nomination for Best Single Producer. On May 31, 2015 the song was honored at the 2015 Hito Music Awards, receiving both the Top 10 Mandarin Songs and the Top Single of the Year. On June 10, 2015, it was selected as one of the Top 10 Singles of 2024 by the Chinese Musicians Exchange Association. Later that month, on June 20, 2015, it was named one of the Top 10 Songs of the Year at the 8th Freshmusic Awards.

== Live performances ==
On December 20, 2014, Tsai performed "Play" on the TVB variety show The Voice 4. On December 31, 2014, she performed the song at the New Year's Eve Concert organized by CTV. On February 8, 2015, Tsai performed "Play" at the 10th KKBox Music Awards. On March 25, 2015, she also performed the song at the 2015 QQ Music Awards. On May 31, 2015, Tsai performed "Play" at the 2015 Hito Music Awards. On December 2, 2015, she performed the song at the 2015 Mnet Asian Music Awards. On December 31, 2015, Tsai participated in the New Year's Eve Concert organized by Jiangsu TV, where she also performed "Play".

== Track listings ==
- Digital download and streaming
1. "Play" – 3:13
- Digital download and streaming – Alesso remix version
1. "Play" (Alesso remix version) – 3:18

== Credits and personnel ==
- Starr Chen – backing vocal arrangement
- Jolin Tsai – backing vocals
- AJ Chen – recording engineering
- Mega Force Studio – recording studio
- Jaycen Joshua – mixing engineering
- Ryan Kaul – mixing assistance
- Maddox Chimm – mixing assistance
- Larrabee Sound Studios – mixing studio

== Release history ==
Release dates and formats for "Play"
Region	Date	Format(s)	Version	Distributor
Various	October 27, 2014	Streaming; radio play	Original	Eternal
Various	October 2, 2016	Digital download; streaming	Alesso remix version	Eternal
China	October 2, 2016	Streaming	Alesso remix version	YDX
