= List of awards and nominations received by iKon =

iKon awards and nominations
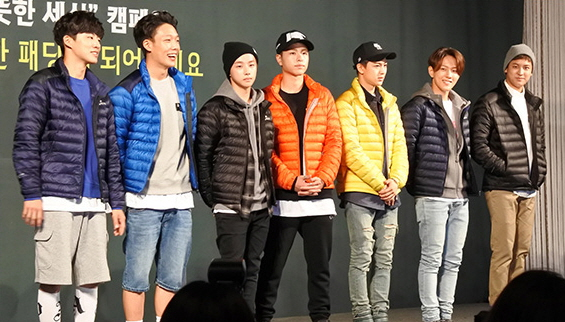
- iKon in 2015
Awards and nominations
| Award | Wins | Nominations |
| Arena Homme+'s A-awards | 1 | 1 |
| Asia Artist Awards | 2 | 2 |
| China Music Awards | 1 | 1 |
| Gaon Chart Music Awards | 5 | 6 |
| Genie Music Awards | 1 | 8 |
| Golden Disc Awards | 3 | 9 |
| Japan Gold Disc Awards | 2 | 2 |
| Japan Record Awards | 2 | 2 |
| Melon Music Awards | 4 | 8 |
| Mnet Asian Music Awards | 2 | 6 |
| Netease Attitude Awards | 1 | 1 |
| QQ Music Awards | 2 | 2 |
| Seoul Music Awards | 4 | 14 |
| Soribada Best K-Music Awards | 0 | 3 |
| The Fact Music Awards | 2 | 2 |
| V Live Awards | 1 | 3 |

Totals (Note: Certain award groups do not simply award one winner. They acknowledge several different recipients, have runners-up, and have third place. Since this is a specific recognition and is different from losing an award, runner-up mentions are considered wins in this award tally. For simplification and to avoid errors, each award in this list has been presumed to have had a prior nomination.)
- Wins: 33
- Nominations: 70

This is a list of awards and nominations received by iKon, a South Korean boy band formed in 2015 by YG Entertainment. After their debut in 2015, the group won the best new artist award at the Mnet Asian Music Awards, Melon Music Awards, Seoul Music Awards, Golden Disc Awards, and Gaon Chart K-Pop Awards. In 2016 the group focused their activities in Japan and China, which led them to win the best new artist award at the Japan Record Awards and QQ Music Awards.

== Korean ==
=== Asia Artist Awards ===
| Year | Recipient | Award | Result | Ref. |
|---|---|---|---|---|
| 2018 | iKon | Artist of the Year – Music | Won | |
| 2018 | iKon | Best Musician | Won | |

=== Gaon Chart Music Awards ===
| Year | Recipient | Award | Result | Ref. |
|---|---|---|---|---|
| 2016 | "My Type" | Song of the Year (September) | Won | |
| 2016 | iKon | New Artist of the Year | Won | |
| 2019 | iKon | Producer of the Year | Won | |
| 2019 | "Love Scenario" | Long Run Song of the Year | Won | |
| 2019 | "Love Scenario" | Song of the Year (January) | Won | |
| 2019 | "Killing Me" | Song of the Year (August) | Nominated | |

=== Genie Music Awards ===
| Year | Recipient | Award | Result | Ref. |
|---|---|---|---|---|
| 2018 | iKon | Artist of the Year | Nominated | |
| 2018 | iKon | Genie Music Popularity Award | Nominated | |
| 2018 | iKon | Best Male Group Award | Nominated | |
| 2018 | Return | Digital Album of the Year | Nominated | |
| 2018 | "Love Scenario" | Song of the Year | Nominated | |
| 2018 | "Love Scenario" | Rap/Hip Hop Music Award | Won | |
| 2019 | iKon | Best Male Group | Nominated | |
| 2019 | iKon | Best Performing Artist (Male) | Nominated | |

=== Golden Disc Awards ===
| Year | Recipient | Award | Result | Ref. |
|---|---|---|---|---|
| 2016 | Welcome Back | Disk Bonsang | Nominated | |
| 2016 | "My Type" | Digital Bonsang | Nominated | |
| 2016 | iKon | New Artist Award | Won | |
| 2016 | iKon | Popularity Award (Korea) | Nominated | |
| 2016 | iKon | Global Popularity Award | Nominated | |
| 2019 | "Love Scenario" | Digital Daesang | Won | |
| 2019 | "Love Scenario" | Digital Bonsang | Won | |
| 2019 | iKon | Popularity Award | Nominated | |
| 2019 | iKon | NetEase Most Popular K-pop Star | Nominated | |

=== Mnet Asian Music Awards ===
| Year | Recipient | Award | Result | Ref. |
|---|---|---|---|---|
| 2015 | iKon | Best New Male Artist | Won | |
| 2015 | iKon | UnionPay Artist of the Year | Nominated | |
| 2016 | iKon | Best Male Group | Nominated | |
| 2016 | iKon | HotelsCombined Artist of the Year | Nominated | |
| 2018 | iKon | Best Vocal Performance Group | Won | |
| 2018 | "Love Scenario" | Song of the Year | Nominated | |

=== Seoul Music Awards ===
| Year | Recipient | Award | Result | Ref. |
|---|---|---|---|---|
| 2016 | iKon | Bonsang Award | Nominated | |
| 2016 | iKon | New Artist Award | Won | |
| 2016 | iKon | Popularity Award | Nominated | |
| 2016 | iKon | Hallyu Special Award | Nominated | |
| 2017 | iKon | Bonsang Award | Nominated | |
| 2017 | iKon | Popularity Award | Nominated | |
| 2017 | iKon | Hallyu Special Award | Nominated | |
| 2019 | iKon | Daesang Award | Nominated | |
| 2019 | iKon | Bonsang Award | Won | |
| 2019 | "Love Scenario" | Record of the Year in Digital Release | Won | |
| 2020 | iKon | Hallyu Special Award | Nominated | |
| 2020 | iKon | Popularity Award | Nominated | |
| 2020 | iKon | QQ Music Most Popular K-Pop Artist Award | Nominated | |
| 2021 | iKon | Legend Rookie Prize | Won | |

=== Melon Music Awards ===
| Year | Recipient | Award | Result | Ref. |
|---|---|---|---|---|
| 2015 | iKon | Netizen Popularity | Nominated | |
| 2015 | iKon | Best New Artist | Won | |
| 2016 | iKon | QQ Asia Artist Award | Won | |
| 2018 | iKon | Artist of the Year | Nominated | |
| 2018 | iKon | Top 10 Artists | Won | |
| 2018 | Return | Album of the Year | Nominated | |
| 2018 | "Love Scenario" | Song of the Year | Won | |
| 2018 | "Love Scenario" | Best Rap/Hip Hop | Nominated | |

==== Melon Popularity Award ====
| Year | Recipient | Date | Ref. |
|---|---|---|---|
| 2015 | "My Type" | September 28 | |
| 2015 | "My Type" | October 5 | |
| 2015 | "My Type" | October 12 | |
| 2015 | "My Type" | October 19 | |
| 2015 | "My Type" | October 26 | |
| 2015 | "Apology" | November 23 | |
| 2015 | "Apology" | November 30 | |
| 2016 | "#WYD" | June 6 | |
| 2016 | "#WYD" | June 13 | |
| 2018 | "Love Scenario" | February 5 | |
| 2018 | "Love Scenario" | February 12 | |
| 2018 | "Love Scenario" | February 19 | |
| 2018 | "Love Scenario" | February 26 | |
| 2018 | "Love Scenario" | March 5 | |
| 2018 | "Goodbye Road" | October 15 | |

=== Soribada Best K-Music Awards ===
| Year | Recipient | Award | Result | Ref. |
|---|---|---|---|---|
| 2018 | iKon | Bonsang Award | Nominated | |
| 2018 | iKon | Popularity Award (Male) | Nominated | |
| 2018 | iKon | Global Fandom Award | Nominated | |

=== Arena Homme+'s A-awards ===
| Year | Recipient | Award | Result | Ref. |
|---|---|---|---|---|
| 2018 | iKon | Musician (Contemporary) | Won | |

=== V Live Awards ===
| Year | Recipient | Award | Result | Ref. |
|---|---|---|---|---|
| 2019 | iKon | Artist Top 10 | Nominated | |
| 2019 | iKon | Best Channel – 3 million followers | Nominated | |
| 2019 | iKon | Global Top 12 | Won | |

=== The Fact Music Awards ===
| Year | Recipient | Award | Result | Ref. |
|---|---|---|---|---|
| 2019 | "Love Scenario" | Best Song | Won | |
| 2019 | iKon | Artist of the Year | Won | |

== International ==
=== Asian Pop Music Awards ===
Note: (Note: Hosted by the Hong Kong Asia Pacific International Group and Sunway Records, the Asian Pop Music Awards bases its winners on the "Asian Pop Music Chart" which opened in September 2019.)

| Year | Recipient | Award | Result | Ref. |
|---|---|---|---|---|
| 2020 | i Decide | Best Male Group (Overseas) | Nominated | |

=== China Music Awards ===
| Year | Recipient | Award | Result | Ref. |
|---|---|---|---|---|
| 2016 | iKon | Asian Most Popular Korean Group | Won | |

=== Japan Record Award ===
| Year | Recipient | Award | Result | Ref. |
|---|---|---|---|---|
| 2016 | iKon | New Artist Award | Won | |
| 2016 | iKon | Best New Artist Award | Won | |

=== Japan Gold Disc Award ===
| Year | Recipient | Award | Result | Ref. |
|---|---|---|---|---|
| 2017 | iKon | New Artist of the Year | Won | |
| 2017 | iKon | The Best 3 New Artists (Asia) | Won | |

=== Netease Attitude Awards ===
| Year | Recipient | Award | Result | Ref. |
|---|---|---|---|---|
| 2015 | iKon | Best Group | Won | |

=== QQ Music Awards ===
| Year | Recipient | Award | Result | Ref. |
|---|---|---|---|---|
| 2016 | iKon | Best New Force Group | Won | |
| 2016 | Welcome Back | Album of the Year (Media recommended) | Won | |
