= The Player (Jolin Tsai song) =

Single by Jolin Tsai
- Language: Mandarin
- Released: June 12, 2018
- Genre: Pop
- Length: 5:17
- Label: Warner; Eternal
- Composers: Nese; Swing Wang
- Lyricist: Kris Wong

Jolin Tsai singles chronology
"Stand Up" (2017)	"The Player" (2018)	"Ugly Beauty" (2018)

Music video
- "The Player" on YouTube

"The Player" (Chinese: 我對我; pinyin: Wǒ duì wǒ) is a song by Taiwanese singer Jolin Tsai, released as the theme song for the 10th anniversary of the online game Dungeon & Fighter. The track was written by Nese, Swing Wang, and Kris Wong, and was released as a single on June 12, 2018 by Warner.

== Background ==
The collaboration between Tsai and Dungeon & Fighter was first teased on May 16, 2018, when the official website of the game released a silhouette image, which many speculated to be Tsai, alongside the announcement "A new leader of DNF is coming." Shortly after, on May 20, 2018, Downtown Music confirmed via Facebook that Tsai had been recording a song with Nese and Swing Wang.

On June 5, 2018, Dungeon & Fighter officially announced Tsai as the 10th anniversary ambassador, marking her as the first ambassador for the game in its decade-long history. It was also revealed that she would perform the anniversary theme song.

== Composition and recording ==
"The Player" reflects Tsai's personal growth and evolution over the past decade, with lyrics that emphasize her persistence and drive to exceed her own boundaries. The song's musical foundation is rooted in electronic dance music, blending house, drum beats, and syncopation to create a dynamic, layered sound. The track features a bold and confident attitude, enhanced by trap elements and a memorable melody. Tsai's vocal delivery is described as impactful, fluidly shifting between verses and choruses to convey emotional depth and energy.

== Release ==
On June 6, 2018, Dungeon & Fighter announced that the song would be released exclusively on Tencent's QQ Music. Prior to the official release, over three million users had already pre-reserved the track, generating significant anticipation for its debut.

== Music video ==
On June 15, 2018, Dungeon & Fighter released the official music video for "The Player", produced by WiseMind. In the video, Tsai portrays three different game characters: a magician, a night stalker, and a female gunner. While the production quality of the video received some criticism for being rough, it was widely acknowledged that the video primarily served as a promotional tool for the game rather than a traditional music video.

== Live performances ==
Tsai debuted the song live on June 16, 2018, at the DNF 10th Anniversary Party in Shanghai. She later performed the track again on November 24, 2018, at the DNF Carnival in Shanghai, continuing to associate the song with the game's anniversary celebrations.

== Track listing ==
- Digital download and streaming
1. "The Player" – 2:37
- Streaming (QQ Music)
1. "The Player" – 2:37
2. "The Player" (instrumental) – 2:40

== Release history ==
Release dates and formats for "The Player"
Region	Date	Format(s)	Distributor
Various	June 12, 2018	Digital download; streaming	Eternal
China	June 12, 2018	Streaming	YDX
