= Roll Out the Red Carpet =

Roll Out the Red Carpet may refer to:

- Roll Out the Red Carpet (Buck Owens album), 1966
- Roll Out the Red Carpet (Royal C album), 1996
