= On Happiness Road (song) =

Single by Jolin Tsai
- Language: Mandarin
- Released: November 20, 2017
- Studio: Lights Up (Taipei); Master P (Taipei}
- Genre: Pop
- Length: 3:59
- Label: Eternal
- Composers: Mickey Lin; Lin Chia-ching
- Lyricists: Francis Lee; Lin Huang-kun
- Producer: George Chen

Jolin Tsai singles chronology
"We Are One" (2017)	"On Happiness Road" (2017)	"Stand Up" (2017)

Music video
- "On Happiness Road" on YouTube

"On Happiness Road" (Chinese: 幸福路上; pinyin: Xìngfú lù shàng) is a song by Taiwanese singer Jolin Tsai. Written by Mickey Lin, Lin Chia-ching, Francis Lee, and Lin Huang-kun, and produced by George Chen, the track served as the theme song for the 2018 film On Happiness Road and was released as a single on November 20, 2017, by Eternal.

== Background and release ==
On November 13, 2017, the official Facebook page of On Happiness Road released a 45-second preview of the theme song, though the singer's name was not initially revealed. Many listeners speculated that the song was performed by Tsai. On November 20, 2017, Tsai officially released the track as the theme song for the film.

Tsai explained that she accepted the project because she was moved by the film's spirit and wanted to dedicate the song to her hometown of Hsinchuang. Coincidentally, both director Sung Hsin-yin and Tsai were born in Hsinchuang. Sung later mentioned that Tsai was her ideal choice to interpret the song, noting that Tsai's personal life experiences aligned with the protagonist's story in the film: "Striving for recognition and perfection, striving to love, persisting in the pursuit of happiness despite hardship. Jolin Tsai is a wild rose nurtured by her hometown soil, beautiful and resilient."

The accompanying music video, directed by Sung, was also released on November 20, 2017, alongside the song.

== Composition and recording ==
In "On Happiness Road", Tsai adopts a warm and powerful vocal style, distinct from her usual upbeat or ballad delivery. This vocal choice was made to suit the storytelling nature of the song, which narrates the journey of the film's protagonist. Tsai expressed that the song carries a message of hope and encouragement, wishing to serve as a blessing to those who work hard in life. The song emphasizes the value of ordinary things and suggests that, even in the face of setbacks, happiness can be found by accepting oneself and slowing down. The closing section of the song incorporates lyrics and melody from Fong Fei-fei's classic "Wish You Happiness".

== Artwork ==
The single cover features a childhood photo of Tsai at the age of three, a symbolic reference to the central theme of the film: "Have you become the adult you dreamed of being?"

== Critical reception ==
Shuwa, a music critic on Zhihu, described the arrangement of the song as simple and warm. He praised Tsai's natural and heartfelt delivery, which he believed made the track particularly suited for winter listening. Shuwa also noted that singles released outside of an album context often carry less commercial pressure, allowing for a more genuine emotional expression, which added to the song's charm.

== Commercial performance ==
The single was released as a paid digital download on QQ Music, KuGou, KuWo, and Migu Music, marking Tsai's first paid digital release in China. The song sold over 170,000 copies in the region.

== Live performances ==
On November 25, 2017, Tsai performed "On Happiness Road" at the 54th Golden Horse Awards. On December 16, 2017, she also performed the song at the 11th Migu Music Awards.

== Charts ==
=== Weekly charts ===
Chart (2017)	Peak position
China (Billboard Radio)	8

== Credits and personnel ==
- Tung Yun-chang – guitar
- Liu Han – string arrangement, cello
- Tsai Yao-yu – violin
- Lu Szu-chien – violin
- Kan Wei-peng – viola
- Shan Wei-ming – recording engineering
- Wen Yi-che – recording engineering
- Lights Up Studio – recording studio
- Master P Studio – recording studio
- Lin Cheng-chung – mixing engineering
- Platinum Studio – mixing studio

== Release history ==
Release dates and formats for "On Happiness Road"
Region	Date	Format(s)	Distributor
Various	2017年6月20日	Digital download; streaming	Eternal
