= Hard Boyz =

American hip hop group

- Origin: Atlanta, Georgia, United States
- Genres: Hip-hop
- Years active: 1991–1998
- Labels: Ichiban, Big Beat
- Members: K.T. Big D Royal C

The Hard Boyz (formally spelled Hard Boys) were an American rap group, composed of three members, K.T., Big D and Royal C, formally signed to Ichiban and Big Beat Records.

== Biography ==
Originally signed to Ichiban Records, the Hard Boys released their debut album on March 5, 1992, entitled A-Town Hard Heads, which went to 42 on the Billboard's Top R&B/Hip-Hop Albums chart. After a four-year hiatus, the renamed Hard Boyz returned in 1996 with their second album, Trapped in the Game, and Royal C's solo album, Roll Out the Red Carpet. The group disbanded after releasing a third album entitled Potential Murder Suspects.

== Discography ==
- A-Town Hard Heads (1992)
- Trapped in the Game (1996)
- Roll Out the Red Carpet (1996)
- Potential Murder Suspects (1998)
