= Ego-Holic =

Single by Starr Chen and Jolin Tsai

from the album Welcome to the Next Level
- Language: Mandarin
- Released: October 31, 2016
- Studio: Mega Force (New Taipei)
- Genre: Pop
- Length: 3:09
- Label: Eternal
- Composer: Starr Chen
- Lyricist: David Ke
- Producer: Starr Chen

Starr Chen singles chronology
"Ego-Holic" (2016)	"Prime of the Universe" (2018)

Jolin Tsai singles chronology
"Play (Alesso Remix Version)" (2016)	"Ego-Holic" (2016)	"Give Love" (2017)

Music video
- "Ego-Holic" on YouTube

"Ego-Holic" (Chinese: 戀我癖; pinyin: Liàn wǒ pǐ) is a song by Taiwanese record producer Starr Chen featuring Taiwanese singer Jolin Tsai. It is included in Chen's debut studio album Welcome to the Next Level (2016). Written by David Ke and composed and produced by Starr Chen, the song was released as a single on October 31, 2016, by Eternal.

== Background and recording ==
The song centers on the concept of "loving every version of oneself", emphasizing self-acceptance and individuality. Tsai sings in a vocal range designed to suit both male and female voices, with a soft, low-register delivery that highlights the track's themes of self-love. In the arrangement, Chen minimized the use of synthesizers and instead incorporated live instrumentation, such as electric guitar, to create a spacious and organic sound. The track was mixed by Mike Marsh, resulting in clear vocals and a wide sound field.

== Artwork ==
The single cover was designed by Liao Chun-yu, who proposed the concept of doodling on Tsai's face to visually represent the theme of "ego-love" as a reflection of one's inner self, rather than outward appearance. Tsai participated in the design process, explaining that the doodles symbolized different facets of her identity, such as an eye, thick lips, or a beard, reflecting her inner world and encouraging acceptance of individuality and authenticity.

== Critical reception ==
Tencent Entertainment praised "Ego-Holic" for its house elements that enhanced the track's rhythm, with electronic effects adding lightness and fluidity. The song was described as having a "catchy" listening experience due to its balance of electronic influence and upbeat rhythm.

== Live performances ==
On December 3, 2016, Tsai performed "Ego-Holic" at the 10th Migu Music Awards.

== Controversy ==
The release of the music video, directed by Hsieh Yu-en, on October 31, 2016, sparked controversy. The video depicted scenes of school bullying, where several female students harass an overweight classmate. The uniforms worn by the actors resembled those of Taipei Municipal Zhongshan Girls High School, leading to a backlash from students, teachers, and alumni of the school. Many voiced their dissatisfaction on social media, demanding a public apology and the removal of the video.

On November 6, 2016, the school issued an official statement condemning the video, and its teachers' association encouraged alumni to report the video on YouTube. Some defended the video, arguing that its intent was positive and that the uniforms were not clearly identifiable unless specifically pointed out.

Hsieh explained that the uniforms were intended only to create a sense of realism and were not meant to reference any specific school. He apologized for the discomfort caused and expressed his willingness to address the issue directly. Tsai's manager, Tom Wang, acknowledged the public's reaction and asked Chen's team to handle the situation appropriately. Chen's manager, Kao Han-ling, clarified that Tsai had not been involved in the video's concept or production, noting that she had recorded her vocals out of friendship and regretted the misunderstanding.

Chen himself issued a public apology, acknowledging that creators should take responsibility for such controversies. He stressed that a school's reputation should not be solely determined by the recognizability of its uniforms. In response to the controversy, Chen added a mosaic blur to the contentious footage (00:29–01:08) and re-uploaded the video the same evening with an on-screen apology note.

Despite the backlash, several public figures showed support for the video and its message. Lee Mau-sheng, a law professor at National Taiwan University, argued that the controversy had reversed the roles of victim and perpetrator, and that neither Tsai nor Chen should be scapegoated. Designer Aaron Nieh remarked that bullying is prevalent in all schools, and that pressuring Tsai to apologize amounted to bullying in itself. Director Leo Liao criticized the overreaction, warning that such attitudes could restrict artistic freedom. The online collective Let's Talk About the Truth also condemned the handling of the incident, comparing it to censorship practices from Taiwan's White Terror era.

== Charts ==
=== Weekly charts ===
Chart (2016)	Peak position
China (Billboard Radio)	1

== Personnel ==
- AJ Chen – recording engineering
- Ziya Huang – mixing engineering
- Chung Wei-yu – guitar
- Mega Force Studio – recording studio
- Mike Marsh – mastering

== Release history ==
Release dates and formats for "Ego-Holic"
Region	Date	Format(s)	Distributor
Various	October 31, 2016	Digital download; streaming; radio airplay	Eternal
China	October 31, 2016	Stremaing	YDX
