= Phony Queen =

Single by Jolin Tsai

from the album Play
- Language: Mandarin
- Released: September 29, 2014
- Studio: Mega Force (New Taipei)
- Genre: Pop
- Length: 2:58
- Label: Warner; Mars
- Composer(s): Dominik Rothert; Jason Worthy; Jessica Jean Pfeiffer; Alexander Krause
- Lyricist(s): Wyman Wong
- Producer(s): Andrew Chen

Jolin Tsai singles chronology
"Kaleidoscope" (2014)	"Phony Queen" (2014)	"Play" (2014)

Music video
- "Phony Queen" on YouTube

"Phony Queen" (Chinese: 電話皇后; pinyin: Diànhuà huánghòu) is a song by Taiwanese singer Jolin Tsai, featured on her thirteenth studio album, Play (2014). The lyrics were written by Wyman Wong, with music composed by Dominik Rothert, Jason Worthy, Jessica Jean Pfeiffer, and Alexander Krause, and production by Andrew Chen. It served as the theme song for the online game We Dancing Online DX, and was released as a single on September 29, 2014, by Warner.

== Background ==
On April 13, 2013, Tsai concluded the third leg of her Myself World Tour and announced that she had begun preparing for a new album. On July 25, 2013, she traveled to London, England, to undertake a month-long course in music, dance, and performance. By November 22, 2013, Tsai revealed that the album was still in the song selection phase, with progress moving slowly.

On January 29, 2014, media reports indicated that Tsai would take full creative control over the production of her new album, with potential international collaborations and a production budget exceeding NT$50 million. By April 4, 2014, it was reported that the album was expected to be released in the summer and might include tracks co-written by Tsai herself. On September 5, 2014, Tsai disclosed that the album was nearing completion, with a release planned by the end of the year.

== Composition ==
"Phony Queen" is built on a foundation of house music, featuring lyrics that use irony to critique modern society's excessive dependence on the telephone. The lyricist Wyman Wong pointed out that, in contemporary life, people's closest companion may no longer be their romantic partner but rather their ever-present mobile phone, which plays an essential role in everyday activities such as asking for directions, working, and even choosing meals.

== Music video ==
On September 29, 2014, Tsai released the music video for "Phony Queen", directed by Jeff Chang, with a production budget exceeding NT$6 million. In the video, Tsai took on her first dramatic acting role. Chang initially doubted her ability to handle a comedic character, but Tsai delivered an outstanding performance, rivaling that of professional comedians.

== Critical reception ==
Freshmusic magazine praised "Phony Queen" for “pushing absurdity to the extreme, portraying love in an era obsessed with communication devices, where the protagonist and listeners struggle to distinguish whether they are in a relationship with a person or a digital device.” Conversely, Tencent Entertainment's critic Mi Mi Mao described the track as a formulaic house dance song and found Wyman Wong's lyrical performance somewhat underwhelming.

Danial Chang of PlayMusic noted that as the album's only notably commercial-style single, "Phony Queen" received mixed reactions from fans. He highlighted its vibrant electronic beat intro and straightforward lyrics that depict app-based conversations, using candid words to satirize modern dependence on phones. The chorus humorously confesses a love for the phone, effectively reflecting the issue and provoking thought. PlayMusic's Chia Hsu added that beyond the lyrics, the melody, arrangement, and production are all enjoyable. He described the lyrical style as somewhat old-fashioned and expressed surprise at its selection as the lead single, but ultimately praised the overall production as flawless and entertaining.

== Accolades ==
On November 6, 2015, the song was honored as one of the Top 20 Songs at the 15th Global Chinese Music Awards.

== Live performances ==
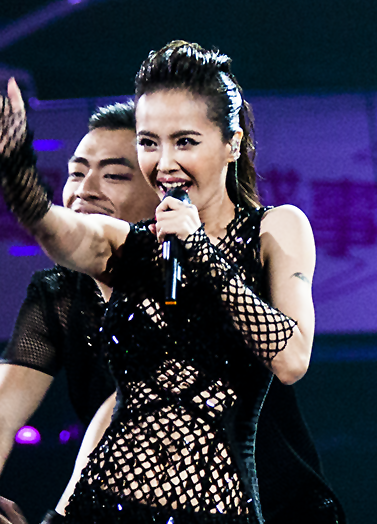
Tsai performing "Phony Queen" at the 2015 Hito Music Awards, May 2015

On February 12, 2015, Tsai performed "Phony Queen" on the 2015 CCTV Spring Festival Web Gala. On May 31,2015, she delivered another performance of the song at the 2015 Hito Music Awards.

== Credits and personnel ==
- Ooi Teng Fong – production assistance, recording engineering
- Andrew Chen– backing vocal arrangement, backing vocals
- Jolin Tsai – backing vocals
- Mega Force Studio – recording studio
- Jaycen Joshua – mixing engineer
- Ryan Kaul – mixing assistant
- Maddox Chimm – mixing assistance
- Larrabee Sound Studios – mixing studio

== Release history ==
Release dates and formats for "Phony Queen"
Region	Date	Format(s)	Distributor
Various	September 29, 2014	Digital download; streaming; radio airplay	Mars
