= Give Love (Jolin Tsai song) =

Single by Jolin Tsai
- Language: Mandarin
- Released: May 12, 2017
- Studio: Platinum (Taipei); Lights Up (Taipei); Good Sound (Taipei)
- Genre: Pop
- Length: 4:37
- Label: Eternal
- Songwriter: Hung Yu-tung
- Producer: Howe Chen

Jolin Tsai singles chronology
| "Ego-Holic" (2016) | "Give Love" (2017) | "We Are One" (2017) |

Music video
- "Give Love" on YouTube

"Give Love" (Chinese: 讓愛傳出去; pinyin: Ràng ài chuán chūqù) is a song by Taiwanese singer Jolin Tsai. Written by Hung Yu-tung and produced by Howe Chen, the track was released as a single on May 12, 2017, by Eternal. It served as the theme song for Da Ai Television's "1+1, You & Me" campaign.

== Background ==
On May 10, 2017, ahead of Mother's Day, Da Ai Television launched the "1+1, You & Me" campaign through its official Facebook page. The campaign encouraged people to upload family photos accompanied by messages of gratitude. Tsai was announced as the artist for the campaign's theme song, and the submitted photos would be featured in the song's music video.

== Composition and recording ==
Originally, "Give Love" was the theme song for Da Ai Television's 2004 TV series Give Love, performed by Lin Mei and the Jit Sin Children's Choir. The original track, known for its graceful lyrics and pop-influenced melody, was later adapted into an English-language version that circulated internationally.

For the 2017 version, Tsai invited Howe Chen to rearrange the song. Tsai spent several days recording the track in the studio, where Chen created two versions of the song: one with a warm and heartfelt tone, and another more lighthearted. Tsai entrusted her mother with choosing the final version. After listening to both, her mother selected the warmer arrangement, describing it as "touching and full of feeling".

== Release ==
On May 12, 2017, Tsai released "Give Love" as part of the "1+1, You & Me" campaign, dedicating the track to all mothers. She explained that earlier in the year, she attended an event dedicated to Syrian refugees, where young Tzu Chi volunteers performed a children's version of the song. Inspired by this, Tsai decided to participate in the project, hoping to spread a message of care, compassion, and love.

On May 14, 2017, Tsai released a lyric video for the song. Shortly after, Da Ai Television released 18 photo-based versions of the music video on May 18, featuring the family photos submitted by the public during the campaign.

== Personnel ==
- Dato Chang – piano arrangement, piano
- Howe Chen – piano arrangement, acoustic guitar
- Will Chieng – piano arrangement
- Brandy Tien – backing vocal arrangement, backing vocals
- Jolin Tsai – backing vocals
- Wu Ting-hui – assistant producer
- Michael Ning – bass
- Jun Kung – drums
- Annie Lo – string arrangement, string producer
- Daphne Su – first violin
- Chin Hsun-chi – first violin
- Lo Szu-yun – first violin
- Lo Ching-hung – second violin
- Chen I-ting – second violin
- Huang Chiung-ling – second violin
- Ho Chun-heng – viola
- Weapon Gan – viola
- Fan Tsung-pei – cello, cello solo
- Wang Pin-wen – cello
- Yeh Yu-hsuan – vocal engineering
- AJ Chen – vocal engineering
- Lin Shang-po – string engineering
- Micky Yang – piano engineering
- Chief Wang – drum engineering, bass engineering
- Tsai Chou-han – assistant engineering
- Platinum Studio – recording studio
- Lights Up Studio – recording studio
- Good Sound Studio – recording studio
- Ziya Huang – mixing engineering
- Mike Marsh – mastering
- The Exchange Studio – mastering studio
- WooJi Studio – mixing studio

== Release history ==
Release dates and formats for "Give Love"
| Region | Date | Format(s) | Distributor |
|---|---|---|---|
| Various | May 12, 2017 | Digital download; streaming | Eternal |
