= We Are One (Hardwell and Jolin Tsai song) =

Single by Hardwell and Jolin Tsai
- Released: June 20, 2017
- Genre: Dance
- Length: 4:22
- Label: Eternal
- Songwriters: Robbert van de Corput; Willem van Hanegem; Ward van der Harst; Robin van Loenen; Alexander Tidebrink
- Producer: Hardwell

Hardwell singles chronology
"Creatures of the Night" (2017)	"We Are One" (2017)	"Make the World Ours" (2017)

Jolin Tsai singles chronology
"Give Love" (2017)	"We Are One" (2017)	"On Happiness Road" (2017)

"We Are One" is a song by Dutch DJ and record producer Hardwell, featuring Taiwanese singer Jolin Tsai. Written by Robbert van de Corput, Willem van Hanegem, Ward van der Harst, Robin van Loenen, and Alexander Tidebrink, the track was produced by Hardwell and released as a single on June 20, 2017, by Eternal.

== Background and recording ==
"We Are One" is rooted in Hardwell's signature progressive house style, incorporating elements of big room house. Tsai described her experience listening to the track as entering a unique space where only she and the music exist. The collaboration marked her first exploration into this genre, which she found both challenging and appealing. She noted that Hardwell's music carries a distinctly masculine energy, with fewer feminine qualities, which pushed her to adjust her vocal delivery.

In the studio, Tsai modified her vocals to achieve a deeper, more magnetic tone to complement Hardwell's electronic sound. She found the recording process highly enjoyable and was satisfied with the final result. Upon hearing the demo for the first time, Tsai felt the track was distinctive and believed the collaboration sparked a creative synergy between her and Hardwell. Hardwell expressed his honor in working with Tsai and praised the outcome of the collaboration.

== Release ==
On June 20, 2017, Tsai premiered "We Are One" at a Migu Music press event in Beijing, where she also served as the "Chief Experience Officer". During the event, Tsai unveiled a promotional campaign centered around the song.

== Commercial performance ==
"We Are One" ranked at number 99 on Taiwan's Hit FM Top 100 Singles of 2017.

== Critical reception ==
Tencent Entertainment described "We Are One" as a rare and refreshing surprise in the contemporary Mandopop market. The review highlighted that this collaboration marked Tsai's first attempt at EDM and that working with an international artist like Hardwell added significance to the release. The production, rooted in Hardwell's progressive house style and infused with big room house elements, emphasized strong beats while incorporating lighter electronic textures for balance. However, the review also noted that the arrangement's dominance resulted in Tsai's vocals being somewhat overshadowed, making them feel more like accompaniment than the centerpiece of the song. While this approach is typical in international EDM, it was seen as potentially polarizing for Mandopop listeners, who are more accustomed to vocal-driven music. Despite this, the review concluded that while "We Are One" might not be Tsai's strongest work, it held experimental value and could serve as a reference for her future stylistic exploration.

== Accolades ==
On December 16, 2017, "We Are One" was recognized as one of the Top 10 Songs of the Year at the 11th Migu Music Awards.

== Release history ==
Release dates and formats for "We Are One"
Region	Date	Format(s)	Distributor
Asia	June 20, 2017	Digital download; streaming	Eternal
