= Stand Up (Jolin Tsai song) =

Single by Jolin Tsai
- Language: Mandarin
- Released: December 29, 2017
- Genre: Pop
- Length: 3:20
- Label: Warner; Eternal
- Composers: Hanif Hitmanic Sabzevari; Dennis DeKo Kordnejad; Pontus PJ Ljung; Daniel Kim
- Lyricist: Xu Qi
- Producer: Jeffrey Kung

Jolin Tsai singles chronology
"On Happiness Road" (2017)	"Stand Up" (2017)	"The Player" (2018)

Music video
- "Stand Up" on YouTube

"Stand Up" (Chinese: 什麼什麼; pinyin: Shénme shénme) is a song by Taiwanese singer Jolin Tsai. Written by Hanif Hitmanic Sabzevari, Dennis DeKo Kordnejad, Pontus PJ Ljung, Daniel Kim, and Xu Qi, and produced by Jeffrey Kung, the track served as the theme song for the 2018 film Monster Hunt 2. It was officially released as a single by Warner on December 29, 2017.

== Composition and recording ==
"Stand Up" incorporates a fusion of rap, hip-hop, and electronic music, settling into the trap genre with a fast-paced, energetic rhythm. Jeffrey Kung, marking his first collaboration with Tsai, described the creative process as highly dynamic. Upon receiving the demo, he recognized the potential to blend electronic and hip-hop elements into the melody. He rearranged the song into an upbeat trap track and encouraged Tsai to experiment with a faster vocal flow.

During the recording process, Kung guided Tsai in delivering the rap vocals, marking a departure from her usual vocal style. Tsai expressed satisfaction with the result, while Kung described the collaboration as both exciting and a significant honor.

== Music video ==
The accompanying music video, directed by Muh Chen, was released on December 30, 2017. The video features a whimsical storyline in which Tsai plays a busy office worker who, during a meeting, dozes off and enters a dream where her colleagues transform into monsters from the movie Monster Hunt. Tsai's character dances with the creatures, with choreography specifically designed to match their exaggerated, monstrous movements. Tsai later revealed that the routine was one of the fastest she had ever learned in her career.

== Live performances ==
On December 30, 2017, Tsai performed "Stand Up" at Zhejiang Television's 2018 New Year's Eve Concert. On January 18, 2018, Tsai brought the song to Weibo Night. Tsai also performed "Stand Up" on February 14, 2018, at Zhejiang Television's 2018 Chinese New Year Gala.

== Release history ==
Release dates and formats for "Stand Up"
Region	Date	Format(s)	Distributor
Various	December 29, 2017	Digital download; streaming; radio airplay	Eternal
China	December 29, 2017	Streaming	YDX
