= Trapped in the Game =

- Digital cover

Studio album by the Hard Boyz
- Released: June 25, 1996
- Studio: Digital Edge (Atlanta, Georgia); Tree Sounds (Atlanta, Georgia); Bosko's House of Chicken and Beats (Los Angeles, California); Bosstown Recording Studio (Atlanta, Georgia); Curtom Recording Studio; Kala (Atlanta, Georgia)
- Genre: Hardcore hip-hop
- Label: Power; Big Beat; Atlantic
- Producer: Bosko; Colin Wolfe; Organized Noize; P.O.R. Productions; Ragged Azz Blast; the Hard Boyz

The Hard Boyz chronology
A-Town Hard Heads (1992)	Trapped in the Game (1996)	Potential Murder Suspects (1998)

Professional ratings
Review scores
Source	Rating
AllMusic	4/5 stars

Trapped in the Game is the second studio album by the American hip-hop group the Hard Boyz. It was released on June 25, 1996, through Power/Big Beat Records with distribution via Atlantic Records. The recording sessions took place at Digital Edge, Tree Sounds, Bosstown Recording Studio, Curtom Recording Studio and Kala Studios in Atlanta, and Bosko's House of Chicken and Beats in Los Angeles. The album was produced by POR Productions, Colin Wolfe, Bosko, Organized Noize, Ragged Azz Blast, and the Hard Boyz. It features guest appearances from DFC, Loose Screws, and Spice 1, as well as contributions from Big Frizz, Hank, Joi, Kyko, Rodney Richard, and Wendell Brown among others. The album debuted and peaked at number 67 on the Top R&B/Hip-Hop Albums chart in the United States.

== Track listing ==
No.	Title	Writer(s)	Producer(s)	Length
1.	"Armed Robbery" (Intro)	Kerry Taylor; Rodney Richard; Carl Dorsey	P.O.R. Productions
2.	"Sawed Off Pump"	Darrell Gilbert; Charles Hood; P.O.R.	P.O.R. Productions
3.	"(How Ya Gonna) Jacka Jacka"	Taylor; Gilbert; Colin Wolfe	Colin Wolfe
4.	"4 Niggas in 1" (featuring Loose Screws and D.F.C.)	Taylor; Hood; Al Breed; Bobby Thompson; Richard	The Hard Boyz; Ragged Azz Blast
5.	"Trapped in the Game" (featuring Spice 1)	Taylor; Gilbert; Hood; Robert Lee Greene Jr.; Bosko Kante	Bosko
6.	"Root of All Evil"	Taylor; Hood; Gilbert; Wolfe; Leon Huff; Kenneth Gamble; Anthony Jackson	Colin Wolfe
7.	"Thin Ice"	Taylor; Hood; Gilbert; Organized Noize	Organized Noize
8.	"Sick Psychotic Thoughts"	Taylor; Hood; P.O.R.	P.O.R. Productions
9.	"Ghetto World"	Gilbert; Taylor; P.O.R.; Thomas Allen; Harold Ray Brown; Morris Dickerson; Leroy Jordan; Lee Levitin; Charles Miller; Howard E. Scott	P.O.R. Productions
10.	"Niggas in the Street"	Taylor; P.O.R.	P.O.R. Productions
11.	"G'State Soldier"	Taylor; F. Taylor; P.O.R.	P.O.R. Productions
12.	"Superfly"	Taylor; P.O.R.	P.O.R. Productions
13.	"Time to Pray"	Taylor; P.O.R.	P.O.R. Productions
14.	"Outro Groove"	Gilbert; Hood; P.O.R.	P.O.R. Productions

== Personnel ==
- Kerry "K.T./Mr. No Love" Taylor – vocals (tracks: 2–13), producer & mixing (track 4)
- Charles "Royal C" Hood – vocals (tracks: 1, 2, 4–8), producer & mixing (track 4)
- Darrell "Big D" Gilbert – vocals (tracks: 2, 3, 5–7, 9), producer & mixing (track 4)
- Rodney Richards – vocals (track 1), mixing (track 4)
- Al Breed – vocals (track 4)
- Bobby "T Double" Thompson – vocals (track 4)
- Robert Lee "Spice 1" Greene Jr. – vocals (track 5)
- Kyko – background vocals (track 5)
- Joi Gilliam – background vocals (track 6)
- Wendell Brown – background vocals (track 9)
- F. "Big Frizz" Taylor – vocals (track 11)
- Hank – background vocals (track 13)
- Carl "Cooly C" Dorsey – keyboards (track 1), engineering & mixing (tracks: 1, 14)
- Spec – keyboards (track 4)
- Bony "E" – bass (track 4), guitar (track 6), mixing (track 9)
- Martin Terry – guitar (track 7)
- Jody Mayfirel – keyboards (track 7)
- Preston Crump – bass (track 7)
- P.O.R. Productions – producer (tracks: 1, 2, 8–14), engineering (tracks: 2, 8, 13), mixing (tracks: 8, 10, 12)
- Colin Wolfe – producer & mixing (tracks: 3, 6), engineering (track 3)
- Ragged Azz Blast – producer (track 4)
- Bosko Kante – producer & engineering (track 5)
- Organized Noize – producer & mixing (track 7)
- Edd Miller – mixing (tracks: 2, 3, 6, 9, 11), engineering (tracks: 3, 6, 9–12)
- Ed Rogers – engineering (track 4)
- Rubin "Silver Keys" Randolph – engineering (track 4)
- Brian Frye – engineering (track 7)
- Bernasky Wall – engineering (track 7)
- Neal H Pogue – mixing (track 7)
- Andre Tarber – engineering assistant (track 7)
- Steven Rhodes – mixing (tracks: 8, 10, 12)
- Leroy McMath – mixing (track 9), executive producer, A&R direction
- Rick Essig – mastering
- Daniel Perry – art direction, design
- Georgette Willis – A&R assistant
- Glenn Orenstein – project supervisor

== Charts ==
Chart (1996)	Peak position
US Top R&B/Hip-Hop Albums (Billboard)	67
