= The Third Person and I =

Single by Jolin Tsai

from the album Play
- Language: Mandarin
- Released: November 10, 2014
- Studio: Platinum (Taipei); Wasteland (Taipei)
- Genre: Pop
- Length: 4:46
- Label: Warner; Eternal
- Composer: JJ Lin
- Lyricist: Tom Wang
- Producer: JJ Lin

Jolin Tsai singles chronology
"Play" (2014)	"The Third Person and I" (2014)	"I Wanna Know" (2016)

Music video
- "The Third Person and I" on YouTube

"The Third Person and I" (Chinese: 第三人稱; pinyin: Dì sān rénchēng) is a song by Taiwanese singer Jolin Tsai, featured on her thirteenth studio album Play (2014). It was written by Tom Wang and JJ Lin, who also produced the song. It was released on November 10, 2014, by Warner as the second single from Play.

== Background ==
On September 5, 2014, Tsai announced that her new album was nearing completion and was scheduled for release by the end of the year. On October 27, 2014, she released the album's lead single, "Play".

== Composition ==
The lyrics of "The Third Person and I" portray how modern individuals often adopt a detached, indifferent attitude when facing life or relationship challenges. Tsai explained that the song expresses the feeling of "stepping outside oneself to observe", as if playing her own role and then stepping back to watch, allowing for clearer understanding of earlier immaturity, shyness, and difficulty expressing emotions—a process she describes as growth.

During production, Tsai suggested incorporating guitar elements and praised JJ Lin's mastery and creativity in crafting ballads. She expressed satisfaction with the final arrangement and added that the song conveys the message that every five to ten years, life brings changes that encourage personal growth and progress.

== Music video ==
On November 13, 2014, Tsai released the music video for "The Third Person and I", directed by Fu Tien-yu and featuring actress Carina Lau. In the video, Tsai plays dual roles as both a "female director" and an "actress". The "female director" observes the "actress" struggling with love from a third-person perspective, while Lau's character watches the "female director" from yet another third-person viewpoint. Lau's role symbolizes an ideal woman embodying life wisdom, representing hope and possibilities after overcoming difficulties. Tsai expressed her wish for women to be confident and clear about their desires—like Lau's character—and to face challenges with a positive attitude.

The music video reached number one on YinYueTai's V Chart weekly rankings.

== Commercial performance ==
The song ranked eighth on Taiwan's Hit FM Top 100 Singles of 2014.

== Critical reception ==
Taiwanese musician Adam Hsu praised "The Third Person and I" as a soothing, modern-style song, commending Tom Wang's delicate lyrics that reveal an outlet within a complex three-person relationship. He also noted Tsai's casting of Carina Lau in the music video as a demonstration of her growing influence and refinement in music, connections, and artistic positioning. Freshmusic magazine highlighted how the song captures the restrained emotions of a breakup scene, with lyrics shifting between first and third person perspectives to portray the protagonist's inner conflict, ultimately blurring the line between reality and illusion.

Yen Fu-min of United Daily News observed that although it is a love song, the track reflects Tsai's creative evolution—from relying on record labels to taking charge of her music. The third-person perspective extends into the music video's director's viewpoint, symbolizing self-healing and artistic growth.Tencent Entertainment praised the song's guitar arrangement for its indie rock style, rare in JJ Lin's past works. They felt the composition was conventional but the arrangement and lyrics created an atmosphere strong enough to qualify it as a lead single.

Danial Chang from PlayMusic described "The Third Person and I" as a rock-influenced ballad reminiscent of Coldplay's "Magic" or OneRepublic's style. The guitar, bass, and drum arrangement contrasts with the piano accompaniment in Tsai's song "Mosaic". Another PlayMusic music critic, Chia Hsu, commented that Tsai's vocal delivery in the lower register was somewhat forceful, causing a jarring effect at the song's entry. Nevertheless, he considered it a solid performance within her slower songs catalog, noting that her fast songs tend to stand out more. He also praised Kenn C's tasteful guitar work and JJ Lin's melodic composition.

== Accolades ==
On May 15, 2015, "The Third Person and I" was selected as one of the Top 20 Songs of the Year at the 5th Global Chinese Golden Chart Awards. On August 23, 2015, it was selected as one of the Top Songs of the Year for the Hong Kong and Taiwan region at the 2014 Music Radio China Top Chart Awards.

== Live performances ==
On November 22, 2014, Tsai performed "The Third Person and I" on the CCTV variety program Global Chinese Music. On December 31, 2014, she took the stage at the New Year's Eve Concert held by CTV with the same song. On March 25, 2015, she performed it once again at the 2015 QQ Music Awards.

== Credits and personnel ==
=== Recording ===
- Platinum Studio – recording studio, mixing studio
- Wasteland Studio – recording studio

=== Personnel ===
- JJ Lin – vocal production
- Shin Chou – production assistance, recording engineering
- Christine Chien – backing vocal arraignment, backing vocals
- Kenn C – guitar, keyboard
- Joshua Lee – recording engineering
- Jeremy Lin – mixing engineering

== Release history ==
Release dates and formats for "The Third Person and I"
Region	Date	Format(s)	Distributor
Various	November 10, 2014	Digital download; streaming	Eternal
