= Eternal (record label) =

Taiwanese record label

Eternal Music Production Co., Ltd.
- Native name: 凌時差音樂製作有限公司
- Type: Private
- Industry: Music; Entertainment
- Founded: October 15, 2009; 17 years ago
- Founders: Ke Fu-hung; Jolin Tsai
- Headquarters: Taipei, Taiwan
- Area served: Taiwan
- Services: Artist management; Event organization; Music publishing

Eternal Music Production Co., Ltd. (Chinese: 凌時差音樂製作有限公司) is a Taiwanese artist management and music production company jointly founded in 2009 by Taiwanese talent manager Ke Fu-hung and singer Jolin Tsai. The company's operations encompass artist management for Tsai, music production and copyright management, concert organization and related copyright affairs, as well as the recruitment of members for international fan clubs.

== Music productions ==
=== Albums ===
- Play (2014)
- Play World Tour (2018)
- Ugly Beauty (2018)
- The Wolf Original Television Series Soundtrack (2020)
- Pleasure (2025)

=== Singles ===
- "Kaleidoscope" (2014)
- "The Third Person and I" (2014)
- "I Wanna Know" (2016)
- "Play (Alesso Remix Version)" (2016)
- "Ego-Holic" (2016)
- "Give Love" (2017)
- "We Are One" (2017)
- "On Happiness Road" (2017)
- "Stand Up" (2017)
- "The Player" (2018)
- "Ugly Beauty" (2018)
- "Untitled" (2022)
- "Someday, Somewhere" (2023)
- "Oh La La La" (2023)
- "Pleasure" (2025)
- "DIY" (2025)
- "Prague Square (Jolin Version)" (2026)

== Show productions ==
- Play World Tour (2015–2016)
- Ugly Beauty World Tour (2019–2024)
