= Roll Out the Red Carpet (Royal C album) =

Studio album by Royal C of the Hard Boyz
- Released: August 13, 1996
- Recorded: 1995–1996
- Studio: The Hit Mecca (Atlanta, GA); D.A.R.P. Studios (Atlanta, GA)
- Genre: Hip-hop
- Label: Epic Street
- Producer: Colin Wolfe

Royal C of the Hard Boyz chronology
Trapped in the Game (1996)	Roll Out the Red Carpet (1996)	Potential Murder Suspects (1998)

Singles from Roll Out the Red Carpet
- 1. "They Don't Want None / Real G's" Released: July 2, 1996

Professional ratings
Review scores
Source	Rating
AllMusic	2/5 stars

Roll Out the Red Carpet is the only solo studio album American rapper Royal C of the Hard Boyz. It was released on August 13, 1996 via Epic Street. Recording sessions took place at the Hit Mecca and D.A.R.P. Studios in Atlanta. Produced entirely by Colin Wolfe, it features contributions from Joi, Javonne Walker and Theopilus Glass Chip.

== Background ==
Charles "Royal C" Hood, whose group the Hard Boyz had recently joined Atlantic Records, had also signed a deal with a major label, Epic Records, who placed Royal C on their subsidiary Epic Street, which specialized in the hip-hop genre. Epic released the album on August 13, 1996 with popular hip-hop/R&B producer Colin Wolfe producing the entire album. With the exception of a music video for the album's lead single "They Don't Want None", Epic failed to promote the album and it did not do well sales-wise, which eventually led to Epic dropping Royal C from the label.

== Track listing ==
No.	Title	Writer(s)	Length
1.	"Ghetto Court 1" (Intro)	Colin Wolfe; Larry Bird; Wanda Smith; Larry Veal
2.	"They Don't Want None"	Charles Hood; Wolfe; Antonio Hood
3.	"Rollin' on the East Side"	C. Hood; Wolfe
4.	"Ballin' on the Ave"	C. Hood; Wolfe; Kerry Taylor; Darrell Gilbert
5.	"Da Product"	C. Hood; Wolfe
6.	"Real G's"	C. Hood; Wolfe
7.	"Eye for an Eye"	C. Hood; Wolfe
8.	"Daggon Hoez"	C. Hood; Wolfe
9.	"2 O'Clock in the Morning"	C. Hood; Wolfe
10.	"Livin' in da Hood"	C. Hood; Wolfe
11.	"Why Y'all Wanna Trip"	C. Hood; Wolfe
12.	"Cyndrome"	C. Hood; Wolfe; George Clinton Jr.; William B. Nelson
13.	"Fallin'"	C. Hood; Wolfe
14.	"Crooked by Nature"	C. Hood; Wolfe; Taylor; Gilbert
15.	"Ghetto Court 2" (Outro)	C. Hood; Wolfe

Sample credits

- Track 12 contains a sample from "Placebo Syndrome" written by George Clinton, Jr. and William B. Nelson as recorded by Parliament.
