= Potential Murder Suspects =

Studio album by Hard Boyz
- Released: March 24, 1998
- Recorded: 1996–1998
- Genre: Gangsta rap, Southern hip hop
- Length: 61:57
- Label: no limit
- Producer: Hard Boyz

Hard Boyz chronology
Roll Out the Red Carpet (1996)	Potential Murder Suspects (1998)

Professional ratings
Review scores
Source	Rating
AllMusic	3/5 stars

Potential Murder Suspects (P.M.S.) is the third and final album released by the Hard Boyz. It was released on March 24, 1998, through Roadrunner Records and was the least successful of the group's three albums.

== Track listing ==
1. "Listen to 'em Rumors" - 3:18
2. "Think About It" (featuring MC Breed) - 4:50
3. "Thugz Like Us" - 4:57
4. "Who Do You Fear" - 1:09
5. "P.M.S." (featuring Ghetto E) - 5:29
6. "Sick Psychotic Thoughts" (remix) - 4:44
7. "Hellbound" - 5:09
8. "Here They Come" - 4:43
9. "Trapped" (remix, featuring Spice 1) - 5:04
10. "War Stories" - 3:21
11. "I Now Know" - 4:22
12. "Let's Roll" - 4:53
13. "Lost Cause" - 4:45
14. "Let's Straighten It Out" - 5:13
