= A-Town Hard Heads =

Studio album by Hard Boys
- Released: March 5, 1992
- Recorded: 1991
- Genre: Hip hop
- Length: 60:33
- Label: Ichiban
- Producer: Joel Peasvy

Hard Boys chronology
A-Town Hard Heads (1992)	Trapped in the Game (1995)

Professional ratings
Review scores
Source	Rating
AllMusic	2.5/5 stars

A-Town Hard Heads is the debut album by the Hard Boys. It was released in 1992 through Ichiban Records and was produced by Joel Peasvy. The album peaked at number 42 on the Billboard Top R&B/Hip-Hop Albums chart. "Groupies" and "Death Row" were released as singles.

== Track listing ==
1. "Prelude"- 1:40
2. "Street Mutha Fuckas"- 4:32
3. "E Z Pimpin"- 4:50
4. "Jock Itch"- 3:39
5. "Fletch"- :52
6. "3 Counts"- 4:04
7. "A-Town Hard Heads"- 5:56
8. "Strong in the Game"- 4:49
9. "Criminal Behavior"- 5:04
10. "Groupies"- 3:28
11. "Mission to Nowhere"- 4:51
12. "Armed Robbery"- 3:52
13. "Players"- 4:24
14. "At 2 O'Clock"- 1:43
15. "Death Row"- 5:09

== Charts ==
Chart (1992)	Peak position
Billboard Top R&B/Hip-Hop Albums	42
