= Groupies (album) =

Groupies 吉他手

Studio album by Cheer Chen 陳綺貞
- Released: 2 August 2002
- Genre: Folk rock, indie rock
- Language: Mandarin
- Label: Rock Records

Cheer Chen 陳綺貞 chronology
Lonely Without You (2000)	Groupies 吉他手 (2002)	Peripeteia (2005)

Groupies - Jitashou (Chinese: 吉他手; pinyin: Guitarist) is Cheer Chen's third studio album, released by Rock Records in 2002. It was listed in the Top 200 Mandarin Albums by the Taiwanese Musician Institute (中華音樂人交流協會).

== Track listing ==
1. Miss Paranoid (我親愛的偏執狂; wŏ qīn ài de piān zhí kuáng)
2. Too Smart (太聰明; tài cōng ming)
3. A Little Step (小步舞曲; xiăo bù wŭ qŭ)
4. 1234567
5. Say Something (隨便說說; suí biàn shuō shuō)
6. In My Closet (guitar) (躺在你的衣櫃; tǎng zài nǐ de yī guì)
7. A Practice
8. Groupies (吉他手; jí tā shŏu)
9. Black Eyes (黑眼圈; hēi yăn quān)
10. Enemy (就算全世界與我為敵; jiù suàn quán shì jiè yú wŏ wéi dí)
11. Metaphor (小塵埃; xiăo chén āi)
12. Unavailable (不應該; bù yīng gāi)
13. In My Closet (piano) (躺在你的衣櫃; tǎng zài nǐ de yī guì)
