= Hsia Yu =

Taiwanese writer and poet

- Chinese: 夏宇
- Born: Huang Ching-chi; Chinese: 黃慶綺; 18 December 1956 (age 69)
- Writing career
- Pen name: Tung Ta-lung (Chinese: 童大龍); Katie Lee (Chinese: 李格弟)

Huang Ching-chi
- Traditional Chinese: 黃慶綺
- Simplified Chinese: 黄庆绮
Transcriptions
Standard Mandarin
- Hanyu Pinyin: Huáng Qìngqǐ
- Wade–Giles: Huang2 Ch'ing4-ch'i3

Hsia Yu
- Chinese: 夏宇
Transcriptions
Standard Mandarin
- Hanyu Pinyin: Xià Yǔ
- Wade–Giles: Hsia4 Yü3

Tung Ta-lung
- Traditional Chinese: 童大龍
- Simplified Chinese: 童大龙
Transcriptions
Standard Mandarin
- Hanyu Pinyin: Tóng Dàlóng
- Wade–Giles: Tung2 Ta4-lung2

Huang Ching-chi (Chinese: 黃慶綺; born 18 December 1956), known professionally by Hsia Yu (夏宇), Tung Ta-lung (童大龍), and Katie Lee (李格弟), is a Taiwanese poet, writer, lyricist, and playwright.

== Early life ==
Born 18 December 1956, Lee graduated from National Taiwan University of Arts with a film studies degree and had a few part-time jobs in publishing and TV broadcasting companies. She started her contemporary poetry writing at the age of 19. She lived in the Southern France, returned to Taiwan, and since then has been living in both Taipei and Paris.

== Career ==
=== Early career ===
The first song Lee wrote was Tai Hsiang Lee's “Gau Bie 告別”. The creation of the song began with an intellectual property dispute between different record companies. Chung-tan Tuan from Rock Records advised Tai Hsiang Lee to rewrite the lyrics and contacted Hsia Yu to assist. By combining the pronunciation of her English name with Tai Hsiang Lee's surname, Hsia Yu created her pen name for writing lyrics: “Katie Lee”. The new lyrics were completed in one afternoon, but did not satisfactorily match the melodies from the original song. Tai Hsiang Lee decided to rewrite the melody and create a completely new song. The song “Gau Bie告別” was completed and this was the beginning of Lee's lyricist career. She has continued to write under various pen names, including “Talung Tung” and “Fei Lee”.

=== Songwriter ===
Since her debut as a lyricist in 1984, Lee has written over 200 songs, including “I'm Not Good Looking But I'm Very Gentle 我很醜，可是我很溫柔” by Chief Chao, “Ni Zai Fan Nao Xie She Me Ne? Qin Ai De 你在煩惱些什麼呢？親愛的” and “Impulsiveness 情不自禁” by Hsueh Shih-ling, “Feng De Tan Xi 風的嘆息” by Mavis Hee, “Ni Shi Wu Wo Shi Jiu Guan 你是霧我是酒館” by Joey Wong, “Ta De Xin Shi Ge Ju Da Ting Che Chang 她的心是個巨大停車場” by Sylvia Chang, “Zhuang Man Wo, Ni De Yan Jing 裝滿我，你的眼睛” by Pauline Lan, “Ai Cing Du Zhu 愛情賭注” by Michelle Pan, “Ni Shi Tian Shang Zui Yuan De Na Ke Xing Xing 你是天上最遠的那顆星星” and “Can Ku De Wen Rou 殘酷的溫柔” by Chyi Chin, “Woman & The Child 女人與小孩” by Yu Chyi, “Mei Ge Ren Dou You Zi Ji De Bang Yao Hun 每個人都有自己的幫要混” by Bobby Chen, etc.

Several singers have had success with songs written by Lee. For example, as a new artist Chief Chao had success with the song “I'm Not Good Looking But I'm Very Gentle 我很醜，可是我很溫柔”, the song chosen by the producer Kay Huang. In addition to songs like “Impulsiveness 情不自禁” and “Ni Zai Fan Nao Xie She Me Ne? Qin Ai De 你在煩惱些什麼呢？親愛的” , Hsueh Shih-ling also collaborated with Lee on his very last album in 1990, “Life 生老病死”. The songs included “Alone or Together 一個人、兩個人”, “A Lonely Island 一座孤獨的島” and “Bloody Mary 血腥瑪麗”.

Lee also created Sandee Chan's “Leaving on a Jet Plane乘噴射機離去”, Jolin Tsai's “Play我呸”, Waa Wei's “You Lovely Bastard 還是要相信愛情啊混蛋們”, and others. “Play我呸” has served as a significant work in Jolin's music career. “Play我呸” received many awards globally and paved new ways for Jolin Tsai's performing career.

More recent lyrics by Lee include Cheer Chen's “A Box of Rain 雨水一盒”, Hebe Tien's “A Better Rival in Love 請你給我好一點的情敵”, Jam Hsiao “Golden Love 純金打造”, Chris Lee “Cun Zai Gan 存在感”, Shin “煉金術 Alchemy”, and songs she collaborated on with Greeny Wu such as “As a Monster作為怪物” and “Ah! Muo Qi 啊！默契”, etc. Some of the terms in her lyrics have also become widely-used slang expressions, such as “cool”, “happy while in pain”, “play”, and “everyone has their gang to hang”. She has also written the lyrics for three of Jimmy's musicals.

=== Voice appearances ===
In 2002, Lee released an album with the title “Hsia Yu’s Yue Hun Band 夏宇愈混樂隊” (The trashier the better band of Hsia Yu). In the album, she compiled 13 of the lyrics that were not shortlisted by record companies and invited producer Rou Zheng Chen to write and produce the songs. These songs were performed by many indie artists, including Faye, the former vocalist of F.I.R. Lee also personally narrated the album in the name of Hsia Yu. In 2016, Lee and sound artist Jun Yan together published “7 Poems and Some Tinnitus七首詩和一些耳鳴”, an experimental sound artwork with seven tracks of Lee's narration along with Yan's music arrangement.

Lee has also made a few occasional appearances in other artists’ works, mostly through narration of poems under the name of Hsia Yu. Such albums include Sandee Chan's song “Ni Zai Fan Nao Xie She Me Ne? Qin Ai De 你在煩惱些什麼呢？親愛的”, Hello Nico “Wo Men Ku Nan De Ma Xi Ban我們苦難的馬戲班”, Waa Wei's “Gou Yin勾引”, Sodagreen's “Spring 春．日光” album, and Chiu Pi's “Zheng Ye Da Yu整夜大雨”.

== Poet Hsia Yu ==
When working as a poet, Lee adopts the name “Hsia Yu”. “Bei Wang Lu 備忘錄”, the poetry collection she published in 1984, was a self-funded publication which Hsia Yu edited, formatted, and designed. There were only 500 copies in the first edition plus another 500 that sold out the next year.

Hsia Yu then self-funded her second publication, “Ventriloquy 腹語術”, which was described by Chi Cheng Luo 羅智成as “a book that’s against realities”. Her third publication was “Mo Ca · Wu Yi Ming Zhuang 摩擦·無以名狀”, which was produced by cutting out words from the original printed book of “Ventriloquy 腹語術”, and compiling the words into a new piece of literary artwork.

Her fourth publication is “Salsa”. The fifth publication, “Pink Noise”, was published in 2007. It was compiled by translating English words Hsia Yu found from surfing the internet, creating 33 poems. The pages presenting the black English words and pink Chinese words were made from celluloid sheets. She set the key of the first edition to be C Major, and when the second edition was published in 2008, the pink color was brightened by 15%, and the key became D Major. The second edition also included another 22 sheets for the translation of “Wen Shi 問詩”. Due to expensive printing costs, this book also went out of stock soon after.

In 2010, her publications titled “This Zebra 這隻斑馬” and “That Zebra 那隻斑馬” were first sold in the 3rd Simple Life Festival. “This Zebra 這隻斑馬” has a rigid black and white design, with contents neatly formatted. At the end of the book, readers can see the interaction between L (Lee) and H (Hsia Yu). By contrast, “That Zebra 那隻斑馬” has a colorful design and includes only lyrics. The book was cut horizontally to represent the short life span of pop music lyrics.

In 2011, “Poetry Sixty 詩六十首” was published. The entire book was printed with poems and concealed with the texture of scratcher lotteries. Readers could reveal the texts hidden underneath.

Hsia Yu compiled another anthology in 2013 named “88 Shou Zi Syuan 88首自選”. The second and third editions were published in the following two years, with a different selection of poems. In 2017, the fourth edition was published, with the addition of some newer poems and photographs.

In 2016, “First Person 第一人稱”, a work combining 301 lines of poetry and over 400 pictures was published. All of the pictures were taken in 2014, and paired with poetry written by Hsia Yu. The lines of the poem in every picture appear like subtitles (both in Chinese and English) in the movies.

In 2017, Hsia Yu was invited to six stage performances combining poetry and music by FICEP at the event “Nuit de la literature 文學之夜”, located in Villa Belleville in Paris.

In the summer of 2018, Hsia Yu joined the Poetry Night event at National Chengchi University. In July, her poetry was presented in the exhibition “Dream Makers in the section of “Desire for Words 渴望詞語”, where she used ink to cover 19 of her poems. In the September of the same year, Subjam and Hsia Yu published an anthology in Simplified Chinese, incorporating five of her previous publications: “Ventriloquy 腹語術”, “Mo Ca · Wu Yi Ming Zhuang 摩擦·無以名狀”, “Salsa”, “Pink Noise”, and “Poetry Sixty 詩六十首”. At the end of the year, she participated in the exhibition “Re-Base: When Experiments Become Attitude 再基地”.

Published in July 2019, “Luo Man Shi Zuo Wei Dun Wu 羅曼史作為頓悟” is Hsia Yu's newest work, compiling 19 poems written after the publication of “First Person 第一人稱”. Following the printing style of her previous work, Hsia Yu published "Ji Zhui Zhi Zhou 脊椎之軸" in 2020.

== Artistry ==
=== Critique ===
Being the producer of “I'm Not Good Looking But I'm Very Gentle 我很醜，可是我很溫柔” and “Nan Hai Kan Jian Ye Mei Gui 男孩看見野玫瑰”, Kay Huang once commented on working with Lee: “as Lee’s words are not limited to the framework of pop music, rhyming, and stanzas, her lyrics are unique. They allow songwriters to explore new possibilities from different perspectives.” Music critic Shi Fang Ma commented, “I adore Katie Lee. She can’t be copied for she’s too smart and sharp for industry standards. There are two personalities in lyricist Katie Lee and poet Hsia Yu, and they each hold different missions. I think you can feel this warmth that embraces the world mortals in Lee’s works. She can write songs like “告別Gau Bie” and also “Play我呸”. How good can she get?”

The Nobel laureate in Literature, Xingjian Gao commented on Hsia Yu’s work: “This anthology defeats all misty poems. This girl defeats the whole misty poetry genre.”

=== Writing style ===
In contrast to Chinese pop music productions, Lee usually writes the lyrics first and then hands it to someone to write the melody. In her early career, she submitted the handwritten drafts directly. Lee would also meet with the singer to get more understanding of the person, so she could feel the personality of the singer and be inspired to write lyrics that are suitable for him/her. Occasionally, she has filled in the lyrics according to the melody, such as the collaboration with Jian Min Jiang “Happy While In Pain痛並快樂著”, and many songs in 2019's collaboration with Shin's “Alchemy 煉金術” album, including “Alchemy 煉金術” and “Ran Liao 燃料”, and “醒” (melody by David Tao). Lee has said that writing poems and lyrics are equally important to her and that they are mutually dependent on each other.

== Lyrics works ==
List of representative works:

歌名	歌手
告別	Tai Hsiang Lee
他的心是一個巨大的修車廠、一個失戀男子的告白	Sylvia Chang
酷	Lee Yaming
我很醜，可是我很溫柔	Chao Chuan
女人與小孩	Yu Chyi
我想我應該走了、生日的清晨	Augustine Yeh
孤獨的需要	Harlem Yu
梳子與刮鬍刀、城市英雄、薔薇女子	Lily Lee
愛情賭注	Michelle Pan
你在我靈魂的邊緣	Tracy Huang
你在煩惱些什麼呢？親愛的、情不自禁、血腥瑪麗	Hsueh Shih-ling
乘噴射機離去	Sandee Chan
失明前我想記得的四十七件事、雨水一盒	Cheer Chen
雨中的操場、被雨傷透	Sodagreen “Turn Left Turn Right Musical”
請你給我好一點的情敵、影子的影子、烏托邦	Hebe Tien
還是要相信愛情啊混蛋們、勾引	Waa Wei
Play我呸	Jolin Tsai
純金打造	Jam Hsiao
關於我	Yoga Lin
想睡的戀人噢	Rainie Yang

== Publications ==
- Bei Wang Lu 備忘錄 (1984)
- Ventriloquy 腹語術 (1991)
- Mo Ca · Wu Yi Ming Zhuang 摩擦·無以名狀(1995)
- Salsa (1999)
- Pink Noise 粉紅色噪音(2007)
- This Zebra 這隻斑馬 & That Zebra 那隻斑馬 (2010)
- Poetry Sixty 詩六十首 (2011)
- 88 Shou Zi Syuan 88首自選 (2013)
- First Person第一人稱 (2016)
- Anthology in Simplified Chinese, including “Ventriloquy 腹語術”, “Mo Ca · Wu Yi Ming Zhuang 摩擦·無以名狀”, “Salsa”, “Pink Noise”, “Poetry Sixty 詩六十首” (2018)
- Luo Man Shi Zuo Wei Dun Wu 羅曼史作為頓悟 (2019)
- Ji Zhui Zhi Zhou 脊椎之軸 (2020)

== Awards and nominations ==
- Awarded with “Poem Writing Award of the 30th Anniversary三十周年詩獎” with Epoch Poetry Quarterly. (1984)
- Awarded with “Most Expected Writer of the Year 年度最期待作家” by “Eslite Awards 誠品書店閱讀職人大賞” with “First Person 第一人稱”. (2016
- Nominated for “Best Lyricist” in the 23rd Golden Melody Award with “A Better Rival in Love 請你給我好一點的情敵” by Hebe Tien. (2012)
