= Alex Ni =

Taiwanese American songwriter

Alex Ni (Chinese: 倪子岡), known professionally as Nese, is a Taiwanese American singer, songwriter, and record producer. In 2014 Nese wrote Jolin Tsai's "Play". The song received coverage in Time magazine and was nominated for multiple music awards such as Song of the Year, Best Music Arraignment, and Best Music video in the 26th Golden Melody Awards.

== Early life ==
Nese was born in Seattle, United States. He learned piano and violin since childhood and graduated from the University of Washington with a degree in visual arts.

== Career ==
=== Early career ===
Nese was deeply influenced by Western music and began to release his songs in the Chinese music industry upon his move to Taiwan. In 2006, Nese wrote three songs in Elva Hsiao's "1087" album, including "Confession 表白". His unique style of EDM began to receive acclamation, and gradually led to the rise of his prominence as the top producer of hip-hop and electronic dance music in the Chinese music industry.

In 2008, Nese collaborated with Elva Hsiao again in the "3 Faced Elva 3面夏娃" album, continuing his legacy of dynamic rhythms and chic music styles. He also participated in the rap performance of the song "We’re a Great Match 速配程度". In the same year, Nese participated in the songwriting and singing of the theme songs "Superman" and "Jue Dui Wu Di 絕隊無敵" for the popular drama "Hot Shot 籃球火".

=== Songwriter and producer ===
Over the years, Nese has collaborated with many well-known Asian artists, including Jolin Tsai, A-Mei Chang, Eason Chan, Wilber Pan, Sammi Cheng, Lu Han, Han Geng, Cyndi Wang, A-Lin, Lollipop F, Amber An, Coco Lee, Momo Wu, and Waa Wei. Internationally, his credits include South Korea’s NCT 127, Hyolyn, and GFriend, as well as Japan’s Lol, among others.

In 2014 Nese composed Jolin Tsai's "Play 我呸" and co-arranged the song with Starr Chen, with Katie Lee writing the lyrics. This song broke the record for various charts in the Chinese music industry and won multiple awards, including the most viewed music video in 2014 from YouTube Taiwan, 2015 German Red Dot Award: Brands & Communication Design, the champion of 5th Global Chinese Golden Chart from Hit FM, 2015 Hito Top Ten Chinese Songs of the Year and 2014 Top 100 Singles Champion from Hito Music Awards, and 2014 Top Ten Singles from The Association of Music Workers in Taiwan, etc.

Nese is currently the general manager of the music production company "NESE Music 岡歌文創". He has also participated in various songwriting camps to promote multicultural exchanges with music and has done co-writing with musicians from around the globe. He has participated in the 2016 Finland A Pop Castle Songwriting Camp, and Warner Chappell Asia Pacific Songwriting Camp, etc. He has worked with musicians from many countries such as China, Hong Kong, Taiwan, Singapore, Malaysia, Japan, South Korea, and Finland, etc. In 2018, Nese was invited to participate in the first songwriting camp jointly organized by Musikmakarna/Songwriters Academy of Sweden and Asia, to exchange music inspirations with Swedish musicians. In 2020, in the album "Imperfect Imperfections 不完美人生指南", Nese released the song "Anti-Perfect 不屑完美" with A-Lin, leading her to make a breakthroughs in music genre.

=== Performance career ===
After cooperating with music producer Jim Lee in "Hot Shot 籃球火" in 2008, Working Master compiled Nese's original demos and released "Working Master – Nese’s Demo Collection". At that time, Nese also participated in many live performances, including TV shows like GTV 100 Entertainment and Taichung City's New Year's Eve Concert.

== Artistry ==
Influenced by Western music, Nese's works are more westernized with a chic style and strong rhythms. His works cover a wide array of styles ranging from upbeat electronic dance music to ballad love songs.

== Works ==
Singer	Song
A-Lin	一直走, 不屑完美, 糾結重啟
A-Mei Chang	So Good, 你在看我嗎, 來鬧的
Andy Hui	蟑螂
Chiyo Monna	Superwoman, Blah Blah Blah
Coco Lee	Fancy
Cyndi Wang	給我多一些, 生命中的美好缺憾
Eason Chan	萬佛朝中, 不能再等待, 不然你要我怎麽樣, 七, 漂亮小姐
Elva Hsiao	表白, 然後, 我的男朋友, Elva is Back, 速配程度, 你不是蝴蝶
Freya Lin	名人錄
GFRIEND (Korean)	Apple
Hyolyn	Body Talk
Janice Yan	Please Don't Cry
Jasmine Sokko	退燒, 困獸遊戲, 女孩主義GIRLS
Jolin Tsai	Play我呸, 我對我, 紅衣女孩
Kai Ko	Be My Baby
Kelly Poon	本小姐不愛
Kimberley Chen	Tag Me
lol (エルオーエル) (Japanese)	lolli-lolli(ロリロリ)
LOLLIPOP F	電司(DANCE)
Lu Han	零界點
Momo Wu	小蠻腰, 最精彩的舞步
NCT 127	Far
Nick Chou	兩秒鐘, 看不見的戰爭
Sammi Cheng	我就是愛你不害怕, 裸體早餐
Vivian Hsu	不值得, 先聽我說完
Waa Wei	跩
Wilber Pan	What Can I Do, 硬鬧

== Awards ==
In 2014, "Play我呸" won the 2015 Top Ten Chinese Songs and 2014 Top 100 Singles from Hito Music Awards, and 2014 Top Ten Singles from The Association of Music Workers in Taiwan. The song was also nominated for "Best Song of the Year", "Best Music Video" and "Best Arranger" in the 26th Golden Melody Awards.
