= Cheer Chen =

Taiwanese singer-songwriter

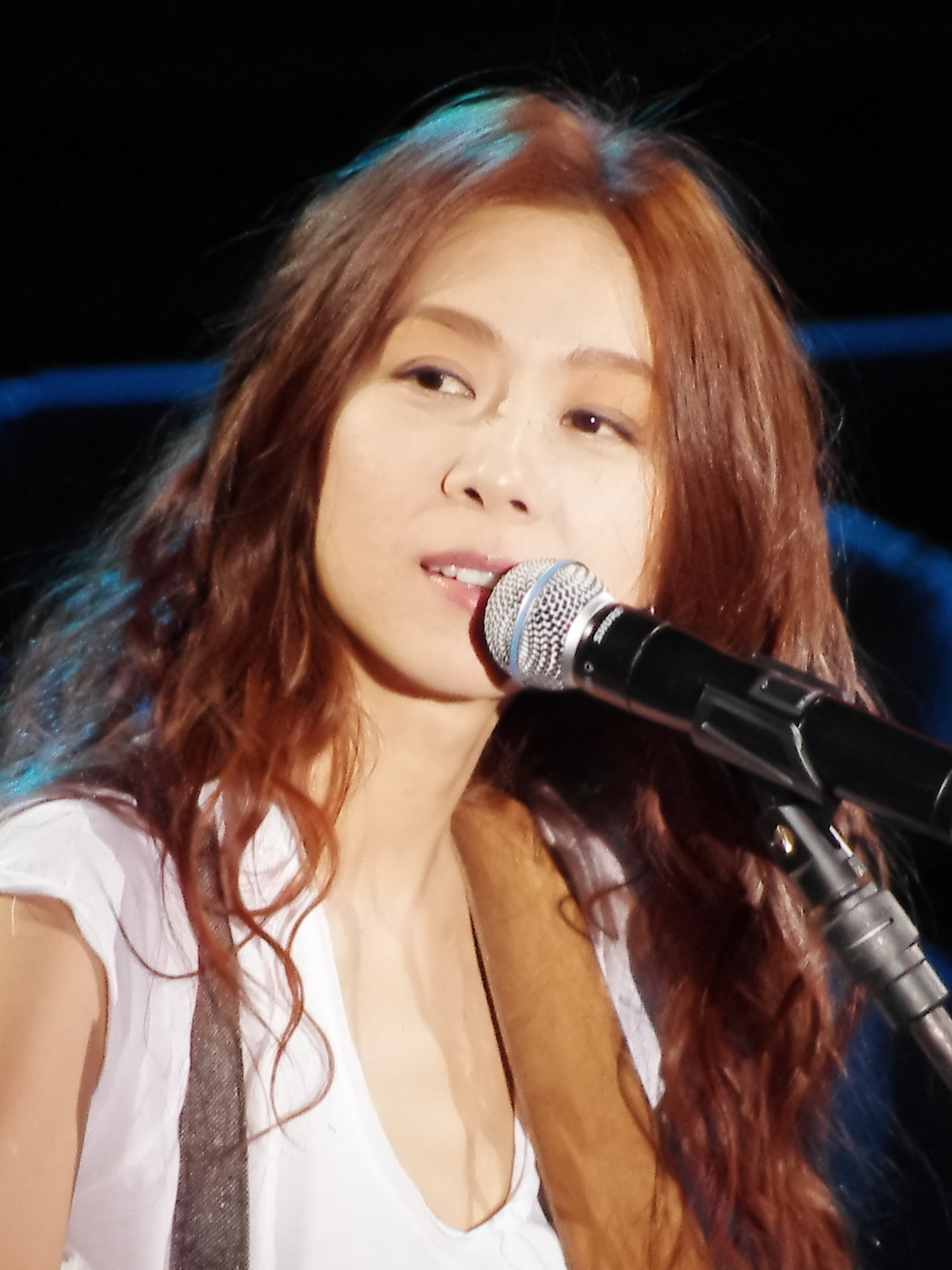
- Chen in 2013
- Born: Chen Chi-chen; 6 June 1975 (age 51); Taipei, Taiwan
- Education: National Chengchi University
- Occupations: Singer, songwriter
- Years active: 1997–present

Chinese name
- Traditional Chinese: 陳綺貞
- Simplified Chinese: 陈绮贞
Transcriptions
Standard Mandarin
- Hanyu Pinyin: Chén Qǐzhēn
- Musical career
- Genres: Indie, rock, folk
- Instruments: Vocals, guitar, piano
- Labels: Magic Stone, Rock, Team Ear
- Website: cheerego.com

Cheer Chen Chi-chen (Chinese: 陳綺貞; born 6 June 1975) is a Taiwanese singer-songwriter. Her most recent album, Sofa Sea, was released in 2018.

== Early life ==
Chen was born on 6 June 1975 in Taipei. Her mother supported her interest in music from an early age. Chen is an alumna of Taipei Municipal Jingmei Girls' Senior High School (臺北市立景美女子高級中學) and National Chengchi University (國立政治大學). Her song "Little School Song" (Chinese: 小小校歌) is generally regarded as the unofficial theme song of Jingmei Girls' Senior High School.

== Career ==
Chen was the singer and guitarist in an underground band called Sunscreen (防曬油) in the 1990s. She produced her first solo demo recordings in 1997. At an early pub show, Chen was noticed and praised by notable Taiwanese rock musician Wu Bai. In 1997 she signed with Rock Records and her debut album Think Twice was released in July 1998, while she was still an undergraduate student at National Chengchi University. She graduated from that university with a Bachelor of Philosophy degree.

Chen is frequently involved in community volunteer activities. She was the first female singer-composer to perform on the stage of Taipei Arena. Chen has also appeared on stage several times with the Taiwanese band Mayday. Singer Ashin (陳信宏) of Mayday said of Chen, "I think that Cheer is a fantastic lyricist, her lyrics appear to be a soft knife that looks harmless but is actually sharp." Most of Chen's songs are in Mandarin Chinese, and occasionally in English. She writes most of her own music and lyrics. She plays acoustic guitar on most of her songs, and occasionally electric guitar and piano.

Chen's 2002 album Groupies was named one of the 200 best albums of all time by the Taiwanese Musician Institute. Chen left Rock Records in 2003 and has since released her records independently. In 2004-2005 she appeared in advertisements for Lee Jeans with Stanley Huang. A song she wrote for the commercials appeared on her fourth album Peripeteia in 2006. That album won the Best Music Album Producer Award and Best Music Video Award at the 17th Golden Melody Awards. Chen was also nominated for Best Female Singer and Best Album of the Year. In 2010 she was nominated for another Golden Melody Award for Best Songwriter.

In 2009, Chen became a spokesperson for Nikon cameras. In 2010 she was featured in an Adidas commercial alongside worldwide celebrities like Hyori Lee, David Beckham, and Oasis. In 2011 she became the spokesperson for Sokenbicha herbal drink for the Taiwanese market.

In 2009, Chen released her fifth album Immortal, which was recorded in her bedroom. The album was mastered by Grammy Award winner Bernie Grundman and was named one of the Top 10 Selling Mandarin Albums of the Year at the 2009 IFPI Hong Kong Album Sales Awards. The album was supported by an Asian and Australian tour that lasted until 2011.

In 2012, Chen formed an electronic/experimental music project with producer Tiger Chung called The Verse (originally The Voice). She has incorporated some songs from this project into her solo concerts. Chen released the album Songs of Transience in 2013. After taking a hiatus from music for several years, she released her seventh album Sofa Sea in December 2018.

== Personal life ==
Chen had been in a relationship with music producer Tiger Chung (鐘成虎) for more than a decade until 2019.

== Discography ==
=== Studio albums ===
Title	Album details	Track listing
Think Twice 讓我想一想	Released: 1 July 1998; Label: Magic Stone; Formats: CD, digital download	Track listing: 1. 讓我想一想 (Think Twice); 2. 微涼的你 (September); 3. 會不會 (Will You); 4. 情歌 (Love Song); 5. 和你在一起 (With You); 6. 嫉妒 (Jealous); 7. 孤島 (Island); 8. 孩子 (Miss Children); 9. 天使 (Devil); 10. 漫漫長夜 (Long Lonely Night)
Lonely Without You 還是會寂寞	Released: April 2000; Label: Magic Stone; Formats: CD, digital download	Track listing: 1. 越洋電話 (After Calling You); 2. 我的驕傲無可救藥 (Selfish); 3. 還是會寂寞 (Lonely Without You); 4. 下午三點 (3pm); 5. 溫室花朵 (Dying In Your Love); 6. 午餐的約會 (Lunch Date); 7. 等待 (Waiting For You); 8. 慢歌3 (Explain); 9. 告訴我 (Tell Me); 10. 慢歌1 (Slow #1); 11. 靈感 (Gift)
Groupies 吉他手	Released: 1 August 2002; Label: Rock Records; Formats: CD, digital download	Track listing: 1. 我親愛的偏執狂 (Miss Paranoid); 2. 太聰明 (Too Smart); 3. 小步舞曲 (A Little Step); 4. 1234567; 5. 隨便說說 (Say Something); 6. 躺在你的衣櫃 - Guitar (In My Closet); 7. A Practice; 8. 吉他手 (Groupies); 9. 黑眼圈 (Black Eyes); 10. 就算全世界與我為敵 (Enemy); 11. 小塵埃 (Metaphor); 12. 不應該 (Unavailable); 13. 躺在你的衣櫃 - Piano (In My Closet (Piano Version))
Peripeteia 華麗的冒險	Released: September 2005; Label: Avex Taiwan; Formats: CD, digital download	Track listing: 1. 旅行的意義 (Travel is Meaningful); 2. 腐朽 (Full Moon); 3. Sentimental Kills; 4. 華麗的冒險 (Adventure); 5. 太多 (Too Much); 6. 花的姿態 (Flower); 7. Self; 8. 80%完美的日子 (80% Perfect Days); 9. 表面的和平 (Surface); 10. 靜靜的生活 (Live in Silence); 11. 最初的起點 (Businesswoman)
Immortal 太陽	Released: 23 January 2009; Label: Team Ear; Formats: CD, digital download	Track listing: 1. 手的預言 (Rebirth); 2. 狂戀 (Complex); 3. 太陽 (Immortal); 4. 魚 (The Edge); 5. 距離 (Distance); 6. 倔強愛情的勝利 (Stubborn Love Wins); 7. 失敗者的飛翔 (Fly for You); 8. 下個星期去英國 (Go to England Next Week); 9. 另一種平靜 (Calm); 10. 煙火 (Fireworks); 11. 一首歌，讓你帶回去 (Take Away)
Songs of Transience 時間的歌	Released: 6 December 2013; Label: Team Ear; Formats: CD, digital download	Track listing: 1. 時間的歌 （Song of Transience）; 2. 漣漪 （Ripple）; 3. 柏拉圖式的愛情 （Prototype）; 4. Peace and Revolution; 5. 雨水一盒 （A Box Full of Rain）; 6. 秋天蒙太奇 （Autumn Montage）; 7. 流浪者之歌 （Gypsy In Memory）; 8. 倒數 （Count Down）; 9. 沙漏 （View with a Grain of Sand）; 10. 普魯斯特行動 （Proustification）; 11. 別送我回家 （Walk Home）; 12. 家 （Home）
Sofa Sea 沙發海	Released: 24 December 2018; Label: Team Ear; Formats: CD, digital download	Track listing: 1. 傷害 （Hurt）; 2. 小船 （Impressionism）; 3. 殘缺的彩虹 （Imperfect Rainbow）; 4. 台北某個地方 （Somewhere, Taipei）; 5. 沙發海 （Sofa Sea）; 6. 跳舞吧 （Loser）; 7. 她說 （She Says）; 8. 華生 （Bromance）; 9. 變色龍 （Chameleon）; 10. 觀察者 （Obsever）; 11. Bonus Track 神魂顛倒 （Kim's Ready Demo）

=== Verse discography ===
1. 52 Hertz 52赫茲 (23 January 2013)

=== Demo CDs ===
1. Demo1 (September 1997)
2. Demo2 - Cheer's Walkman (March 2000)
3. Demo3 (9 November 2001)
4. Demo4 (12 December 2011)

=== Singles ===
1. Track 1 - "Sentimental Kills" (15 November 2003)
2. Track 2 - "Travel with Sound" ("旅行的意義") (24 March 2004)
3. Track 3 - "After 17" (31 December 2004), also included a track composed for Jing-mei Girls' Senior High School - 小小校歌
4. Track 4 - "Pussy" (8 February 2007)
5. Track 5 - "Fly for You" ("失敗者的飛翔") (13 July 2008)
6. Track 6 - "Ephemera" ("蜉蝣") (5 October 2011)
7. Track 7 - "The Long Goodbye" ("偶然與巧合") (1 December 2014)

=== Compilation albums ===
1. Cheer Chen - Princess From East '01 (21 June 2001)
2. Rock Records HK Golden Decade Classics - The Best of Cheer Chen (October 2002)
3. Cheer 1998-2005 (March 2005)

=== DVDs ===
1. Sixteen Days Cheer's Frame-001 (October 2005)
2. Cheer's Flowers Concert Classic Memoirs + 2 CDs (May 2007)
3. Cheer Looks: Cheer's Adventurous Image Diary - Cheer's Frame-002 (September 2007)
4. Immortal Tour (May 2010)
5. A Piece Of Summer II World Tour (September 2012)

=== Unreleased songs ===
1. "Solitude" (孤獨) Partially included as a hidden track after the last song(#10) in the first official album Think Twice Taiwan version
2. "A Practice" (每天都是一種練習) Partially included as a short track(#7) in the third official album Groupies
3. "Monsoon" (季風) Lyrics by Tiger Chung

== Published works ==
1. 《不厭其煩》(Bú Yàn Qí Fán) - collection of lomography with short notes (5 November 2001)
2. LIVE.LIFE 《現場·生活》 2006 Calendar (December 2005)
3. Placeless Place 《不在他方》(Bú Zài Tā Fāng) - a collection of essays written by Cheer published together with a newly released single "Chance or Coincidence / 偶然與巧合" (1 December 2014)
