= Hito Music Awards =

Music awards show

- Venue: Taipei Arena
- Country: Taiwan
- Presented by: Hit FM
- First award: 2003
- Website: Official website

The Hito Music Awards (Chinese: Hito流行音樂獎) is an annual Mandopop music awards show, presented by Hit FM in Taiwan. Unlike the Golden Melody Awards, which are awarded on the basis of votes by members of the jury, the Hito Music Awards are determined by a poll of the public and fans, who can vote through the official website.

American singer-songwriter Taylor Swift is one of the most celebrated western artists at the awards ceremony, having won six awards as of 2021.

== Categories ==
- Top Ten Chinese Songs of the Year
- Western Songs of the Year
- Best Lyricist
- Best Composer
- Best Arranger
- Best Producer
- Best Newcomer
- Best TV Theme Song
- Best Movie Theme Song
- Best Duet Song
- Best Female Singer
- Best Male Singer
- Best Orchestra
