= QQ Music Awards =

- Awarded for: Outstanding achievements in the music industry.
- Country: China
- Presented by: QQ Music (subsidiary of Tencent)
- First award: March 27, 2014

The QQ Music Awards (Chinese: QQ音乐巅峰盛典) is a music awards show founded by Chinese music streaming service QQ Music in 2014.

== Ceremonies ==
Year	Venue	Location
2014	Shenzhen Bay Sports Center	Shenzhen
2015	Shenzhen Bay Sports Center	Shenzhen
2016	Shenzhen Bay Sports Center	Shenzhen

== Awards ==
2016 QQ Music Awards

- Best Male Singer (Mainland China)
- Best Female Singer (Mainland China)
- Best Male Singer (Hong Kong/Taiwan)
- Best Female Singer (Hong Kong/Taiwan)
- Best Group
- Most Popular Male Singer (Mainland China)
- Most Popular Female Singer (Mainland China)
- Most Popular Male Singer (Hong Kong/Taiwan)
- Most Popular Female Singer (Hong Kong/Taiwan)
- Most Popular Western Singer
- Most Popular Mandarin Group
- Most Popular Overseas Group
- Most Influential Male Singer
- Most Influential Female Singer
- Best New Singer
- Best New Group
- Most Breakthrough Artist
- Best Crossover Artist
- QQ Music Chart Most Searched Singer
- QQ Music Chart Most Shared Award
- QQ Music Live Best Stage Performance
- Best Stage Performance
- Best Television Music Show
- Best Classical Album
- Best Concert Album
- Best Creative Album
- Best Live Album
- Best Singing-Songwriting Album
- Best Mandarin Album (Mainland China)
- Best Mandarin Album (Hong Kong/Taiwan)
- Best Music Video
- Best Producer
- Best All-Round Artist
- Most Influential Concert
- Outstanding Contribution Singer
- QQ Music Favorite Singer
- International Most Influential Chinese Artist
- Best Selling Digital Album (Mainland China)
- Best Selling Digital Album (Hong Kong/Taiwan)
- Best Selling Digital Album (Overseas)
- Best Film/Television Songs of the Year
- Top 10 Songs of the Year
- Media Recommend Album
- Best International Single
- QQ Music Fans Award
