= List of awards and nominations received by Jolin Tsai =

Jolin Tsai awards and nominations
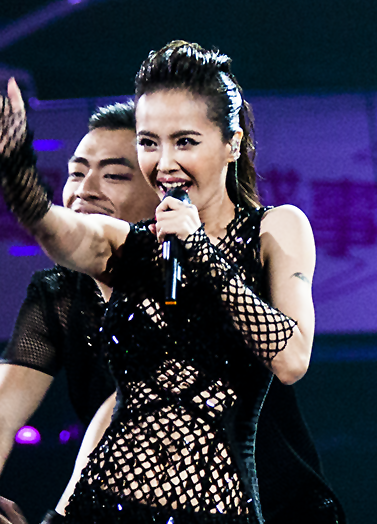
- Tsai at the 2015 Hito Music Awards in Taipei, May 2015
Awards and nominations
| Award | Wins | Nominations |
| Apple Daily Music Awards | 1 | 1 |
| Asia LGBT Milestone Awards | 1 | 1 |
| Asian Pop Music Awards | 2 | 7 |
| Baidu Boiling Point | 5 | 5 |
| Beijing Pop Music Awards | 2 | 2 |
| BQ Top Winner | 1 | 1 |
| BreakTudo Awards | 0 | 1 |
| Butterfly Awards | 1 | 1 |
| Canadian Chinese Pop Music Chart | 8 | 8 |
| CCTV-MTV Music Awards | 3 | 3 |
| China Fashion Awards | 2 | 2 |
| China Gold Record Awards | 1 | 1 |
| China Music Awards | 10 | 10 |
| China Original Music Pop Chart Awards | 2 | 2 |
| Chinese Music Awards | 9 | 9 |
| Chinese Musicians Exchange Association | 4 | 4 |
| Chinese Top Ten Music Awards | 3 | 3 |
| CMIC Music Awards | 5 | 5 |
| Family Music Awards | 9 | 9 |
| Freshmusic Awards | 3 | 3 |
| Global Chinese Golden Art Awards | 1 | 1 |
| Global Chinese Golden Chart Awards | 10 | 10 |
| Global Chinese Music Awards | 21 | 21 |
| Global Chinese Pop Chart Awards | 3 | 3 |
| Golden Horse Awards | 0 | 1 |
| Golden Melody Awards | 9 | 22 |
| Golden Wolf Music Video Awards | 0 | 1 |
| Hito Music Awards | 40 | 40 |
| IFPI Hong Kong Top Sales Music Award | 3 | 3 |
| J. S. G. Selections | 2 | 2 |
| KKBox Music Awards | 26 | 26 |
| KuGou Live Annual Awards | 2 | 2 |
| Line Today Movie & Drama Spotlight Awards | 1 | 1 |
| Little Universe Podcast Awards | 1 | 1 |
| MAMA Awards | 1 | 1 |
| Metro Radio Hits Music Awards | 8 | 8 |
| Metro Radio Mandarin Hits Music Awards | 20 | 20 |
| Migu Music Awards | 17 | 17 |
| MTV Asia Awards | 1 | 5 |
| MTV Europe Music Awards | 0 | 2 |
| MTV Global Mandarin Music Awards | 3 | 3 |
| MTV Mandarin Awards | 4 | 4 |
| MTV Video Music Awards | 1 | 1 |
| MTV Video Music Awards Japan | 0 | 1 |
| Music King Awards | 5 | 5 |
| Music Pioneer Awards | 4 | 4 |
| Music Radio China Top Chart Awards | 20 | 20 |
| My Astro Music Awards | 7 | 7 |
| PlayMusic Awards | 1 | 1 |
| QQ Music Awards | 5 | 5 |
| Singapore Hit Awards | 8 | 8 |
| South-East Music Chart Awards | 1 | 1 |
| Southern Music Festival | 2 | 2 |
| Super Star | 2 | 2 |
| Tencent Music Entertainment Awards | 7 | 7 |
| Tencent Stars Awards | 2 | 2 |
| Top 10 Stars Award | 5 | 5 |
| Top Chinese Music Awards | 5 | 5 |
| Top Music Chart Awards | 1 | 1 |
| Top Ten Chinese Gold Songs Award | 1 | 1 |
| TVB8 Mandarin Music On Demand Awards | 4 | 4 |
| TVBS Music Awards | 2 | 2 |
| UFO People's Choice Awards | 2 | 2 |
| V Chart Awards | 3 | 3 |
| Wave Music Awards | 2 | 4 |
| Weibo Night | 1 | 1 |
| Yahoo Asia Buzz Awards | 3 | 3 |

Totals (Note: Certain award groups do not simply award one winner. They acknowledge several different recipients, have runners-up, and have third place. Since this is a specific recognition and is different from losing an award, runner-up mentions are considered wins in this award tally. For simplification and to avoid errors, each award in this list has been presumed to have had a prior nomination.)
- Wins: 339
- Nominations: 369

Taiwanese singer Jolin Tsai has been nominated 21 times at the Golden Melody Awards, including three nominations for Album of the Year, five for Song of the Year, five for Best Mandarin Album, five for Best Mandarin Female Singer, one for Best Composer, one for Best Single Producer, and one for Best Album Producer. She has won nine Golden Melody Awards in total: Album of the Year for Ugly Beauty (2018) and Pleasure (2025), Song of the Year for "Marry Me Today" (2006), "The Great Artist" (2012), and "Womxnly" (2018), Best Mandarin Album for Play (2014), Best Mandarin Female Singer for Dancing Diva (2006) and Pleasure (2025), and the Favorite Female Singer/Group.

Tsai holds the record for the most Golden Melody Award wins among Mandopop female artists, and she has been certified by the Guinness World Records as the singer with the most Song of the Year awards. Her 2014 album Play received ten nominations, making it one of the most-nominated albums in history, tied with Jay Chou's Fantasy (2001) and A-Mei's Amit (2009). Her album Ugly Beauty (2018) and Pleasure (2025) received eight and nine Golden Melody Award nominations, respectively.

Beyond the Golden Melody Awards, Tsai has received numerous other Chinese music honors, including awards from the Beijing Pop Music Awards, CCTV-MTV Music Awards, China Music Awards, Global Chinese Music Awards, Hito Music Awards, IFPI Hong Kong Top Sales Music Awards, KKBox Music Awards, Migu Music Awards, Music Radio China Top Chart Awards, and Singapore Hits Awards. In 2023, her song "Untitled" was nominated for Best Original Film Song at the 60th Golden Horse Awards.

Internationally, Tsai has also been recognized with several awards, such as the 2001 MTV Video Music Award for International Viewers' Choice for the music video of "Fall in Love with a Street", the 2006 MTV Asia Award for The Style Award, and the 2015 Mnet Asian Music Award for Best Asian Artist Mandarin.

== Awards and nominations ==
| Award/organization (Note: Charts are not included, unless they are explicitly described as "awards" or specific trophies are given.) | Year | Nominee/work | Category | Result | Ref. |
|---|---|---|---|---|---|
| Apple Daily Music Awards | 2011 | Jolin Tsai | Best Female Singer | Won | |
| Asia LGBT Milestone Awards | 2017 | Jolin Tsai | Icon of the Year | Won | |
| Asian Pop Music Awards | 2021 | "Equal in the Darkness" | Best Collaboration – Chinese | Nominated | |
| Asian Pop Music Awards | 2025 | Pleasure | Best Album of the Year | Nominated | |
| Asian Pop Music Awards | 2025 | Pleasure | Top 20 Albums of the Year | Won | |
| Asian Pop Music Awards | 2025 | "Pleasure" | Best Music Video | Won | |
| Asian Pop Music Awards | 2025 | Jolin Tsai | Best Female Artist | Nominated | |
| Asian Pop Music Awards | 2025 | Jolin Tsai, Jackson Dimiglio-Wood, Richard Craker for "DIY" | Best Lyricist | Nominated | |
| Asian Pop Music Awards | 2025 | Jolin Tsai with production team for Pleasure | Best Producer | Nominated | |
| Baidu Boiling Point Awards | 2008 | Jolin Tsai | Most Searched Female Singer | Won | |
| Baidu Boiling Point Awards | 2008 | Jolin Tsai | Top 3 Favorite Female Singers | Won | |
| Baidu Boiling Point Awards | 2010 | "Compromise" | Top 10 Songs | Won | |
| Baidu Boiling Point Awards | 2010 | "Real Man" | Top 10 Songs | Won | |
| Baidu Boiling Point Awards | 2011 | "Love Player" | Top 10 Songs – Hong Kong/Taiwan | Won | |
| Beijing Pop Music Awards | 2008 | Jolin Tsai | Favorite Female Singer – Hong Kong/Taiwan | Won | |
| Beijing Pop Music Awards | 2008 | "Sun Will Never Set" | Top Songs | Won | |
| BQ Top Winner | 2010 | "Honey Trap" | Best Music Video | Won | |
| BreakTudo Awards | 2026 | "Emoji" | International Collaboration of the Year | Nominated | |
| Butterfly Awards | 2008 | Jolin Tsai | Butterfly Benchmark Award | Won | |
| Canadian Chinese Pop Music Chart | 2004 | "Prague Square" | Top 10 Songs – Mandarin | Won | |
| Canadian Chinese Pop Music Chart | 2005 | "Pirates" | Top 10 Songs – Mandarin | Won | |
| Canadian Chinese Pop Music Chart | 2006 | "Exclusive Myth" | Top 10 Songs – Mandarin | Won | |
| Canadian Chinese Pop Music Chart | 2007 | Jolin Tsai | Top Female Singer – Mandarin | Won | |
| Canadian Chinese Pop Music Chart | 2007 | "Pretence" | Top 10 Songs – Mandarin | Won | |
| Canadian Chinese Pop Music Chart | 2007 | "Marry Me Today" | Top 10 Songs – Mandarin | Won | |
| Canadian Chinese Pop Music Chart | 2008 | "Sun Will Never Set" | Top 10 Songs – Mandarin | Won | |
| Canadian Chinese Pop Music Chart | 2010 | "Butterfly" | Top 10 Songs – Mandarin | Won | |
| CCTV-MTV Music Awards | 2004 | Jolin Tsai | Best Female Singer – Taiwan | Won | |
| CCTV-MTV Music Awards | 2005 | Jolin Tsai | Best Female Singer – Taiwan | Won | |
| CCTV-MTV Music Awards | 2008 | Jolin Tsai | Favorite Female Singer – Taiwan | Won | |
| China Fashion Awards | 2006 | Jolin Tsai | Best Female Singer – Hong Kong/Taiwan | Won | |
| China Fashion Awards | 2006 | Jolin Tsai | Best Asia Breakthrough Singer | Won | |
| China Gold Record Awards | 2005 | Jolin Tsai | Best Female Singer – Imported | Won | |
| China Music Awards | 2000 | Jolin Tsai | Favorite Female New Artist | Won | |
| China Music Awards | 2001 | "Don't Stop" | Top Songs | Won | |
| China Music Awards | 2002 | "Lucky Number" | Top Songs | Won | |
| China Music Awards | 2005 | Jolin Tsai | Favorite Female Singer – Hong Kong/Taiwan | Won | |
| China Music Awards | 2005 | "Pirates" | Best Music Video – Hong Kong/Taiwan | Won | |
| China Music Awards | 2006 | Jolin Tsai | Favorite Female Singer – Hong Kong/Taiwan | Won | |
| China Music Awards | 2006 | "Sky" | Top Songs | Won | |
| China Music Awards | 2007 | "Dancing Diva" | Top Songs – Hong Kong/Taiwan | Won | |
| China Music Awards | 2013 | Jolin Tsai | Favorite Asia Influential Singer | Won | |
| China Music Awards | 2013 | Muse | Best Album – Hong Kong/Taiwan | Won | |
| China Original Music Pop Chart Awards | 2010 | Jolin Tsai | Best Female Singer – Taiwan | Won | |
| China Original Music Pop Chart Awards | 2011 | Jolin Tsai | Best Female Singer – Taiwan | Won | |
| Chinese Music Awards | 2011 | Jolin Tsai | Best Dance Music Artist of the Year | Won | |
| Chinese Music Awards | 2012 | Jolin Tsai | Favorite Female Singer – Hong Kong/Taiwan | Won | |
| Chinese Music Awards | 2014 | Jolin Tsai | Best Dance Music Artist of the Year | Won | |
| Chinese Music Awards | 2015 | Jolin Tsai | Favorite Female Singer – Hong Kong/Taiwan | Won | |
| Chinese Music Awards | 2016 | Jolin Tsai | Favorite Female Singer – Hong Kong/Taiwan | Won | |
| Chinese Music Awards | 2017 | Jolin Tsai | Favorite Female Singer – Taiwan | Won | |
| Chinese Music Awards | 2020 | Jolin Tsai | Favorite Female Singer – Taiwan | Won | |
| Chinese Music Awards | 2020 | Ugly Beauty | Top 10 Chinese Albums – Mandarin | Won | |
| Chinese Music Awards | 2026 | Pleasure | Top 10 Chinese Albums – Mandarin | Won | |
| Chinese Musicians Exchange Association | 2007 | "Marry Me Today" | Top 10 Songs | Won | |
| Chinese Musicians Exchange Association | 2015 | "Play" | Top 10 Songs | Won | |
| Chinese Musicians Exchange Association | 2019 | Ugly Beauty | Top 10 Albums | Won | |
| Chinese Musicians Exchange Association | 2019 | "Womxnly" | Top 10 Songs | Won | |
| Chinese Top Ten Music Awards | 2007 | Jolin Tsai | Top Singer – Taiwan | Won | |
| Chinese Top Ten Music Awards | 2019 | Jolin Tsai | Best Female Singer – Hong Kong/Taiwan | Won | |
| Chinese Top Ten Music Awards | 2026 | Jolin Tsai | Favorite Female Singer – Hong Kong/Taiwan | Won | |
| CMIC Music Awards | 2019 | Ugly Beauty | Best Pop Album | Won | |
| CMIC Music Awards | 2019 | Ugly Beauty | Best Pop Performance | Won | |
| CMIC Music Awards | 2019 | "Ugly Beauty" | Best Music Arrangement | Won | |
| CMIC Music Awards | 2019 | "Ugly Beauty" | Best Single Production | Won | |
| CMIC Music Awards | 2019 | "Ugly Beauty" | Best Music Video | Won | |
| Family Music Awards | 2007 | Jolin Tsai | Top 10 Singers | Won | |
| Family Music Awards | 2007 | Jolin Tsai | Favorite Singer – Taiwan | Won | |
| Family Music Awards | 2007 | Dancing Diva | Top 10 Albums | Won | |
| Family Music Awards | 2007 | "Pretence" | Top 10 Songs | Won | |
| Family Music Awards | 2007 | "A Wonder in Madrid" | Favorite Karaoke Song | Won | |
| Family Music Awards | 2007 | "Marry Me Today" | Favorite Collaboration | Won | |
| Family Music Awards | 2008 | Jolin Tsai | Top 10 Singers | Won | |
| Family Music Awards | 2008 | Jolin Tsai | Best Dance Song Performance | Won | |
| Family Music Awards | 2008 | Agent J | Top 10 Albums | Won | |
| Freshmusic Awards | 2015 | Play | Top 10 Albums | Won | |
| Freshmusic Awards | 2015 | "Play" | Top 10 Songs | Won | |
| Freshmusic Awards | 2019 | Ugly Beauty | Top 10 Albums | Won | |
| Global Chinese Golden Art Awards | 2005 | "36 Tricks of Love" | Top 20 Songs | Won | |
| Global Chinese Golden Chart Awards | 2011 | Jolin Tsai | Favorite Female Singer | Won | |
| Global Chinese Golden Chart Awards | 2011 | Jolin Tsai | DJ Favorite Artist | Won | |
| Global Chinese Golden Chart Awards | 2011 | "Honey Trap" | Hit FM Top 100 Number One Song | Won | |
| Global Chinese Golden Chart Awards | 2011 | "Honey Trap" | Top 20 Songs | Won | |
| Global Chinese Golden Chart Awards | 2013 | Jolin Tsai | Best Female Singer | Won | |
| Global Chinese Golden Chart Awards | 2013 | Muse | Best Album | Won | |
| Global Chinese Golden Chart Awards | 2013 | "The Great Artist" | Top 20 Songs | Won | |
| Global Chinese Golden Chart Awards | 2015 | Play | Best Album | Won | |
| Global Chinese Golden Chart Awards | 2015 | "Play" | Hit FM Top 100 Number One Song | Won | |
| Global Chinese Golden Chart Awards | 2015 | "The Third Person and I" | Top 20 Songs | Won | |
| Global Chinese Music Awards | 2003 | Jolin Tsai | Top 5 Favorite Female Singers | Won | |
| Global Chinese Music Awards | 2004 | Jolin Tsai | Best All-Round Artist | Won | |
| Global Chinese Music Awards | 2004 | Jolin Tsai | Media Recommend Award | Won | |
| Global Chinese Music Awards | 2004 | "Pirates" | Top 20 Songs | Won | |
| Global Chinese Music Awards | 2005 | Jolin Tsai | Favorite Female Singer | Won | |
| Global Chinese Music Awards | 2005 | Jolin Tsai | Best Stage Performance | Won | |
| Global Chinese Music Awards | 2005 | "Signature Gesture" | Top 25 Songs | Won | |
| Global Chinese Music Awards | 2006 | Jolin Tsai | Top 5 Favorite Female Singers | Won | |
| Global Chinese Music Awards | 2006 | Jolin Tsai | Top Singer – Taiwan | Won | |
| Global Chinese Music Awards | 2006 | "Dancing Diva" | Top 20 Songs | Won | |
| Global Chinese Music Awards | 2007 | "Marry Me Today" | Favorite Collaboration | Won | |
| Global Chinese Music Awards | 2008 | Jolin Tsai | Favorite Female Singer | Won | |
| Global Chinese Music Awards | 2008 | Jolin Tsai | Top 5 Favorite Female Singers | Won | |
| Global Chinese Music Awards | 2008 | Jolin Tsai | Best Stage Performance | Won | |
| Global Chinese Music Awards | 2008 | Jolin Tsai | Top Singer – Taiwan | Won | |
| Global Chinese Music Awards | 2008 | "Sun Will Never Set" | Top 20 Songs | Won | |
| Global Chinese Music Awards | 2013 | Jolin Tsai | Top 5 Favorite Female Singers | Won | |
| Global Chinese Music Awards | 2013 | "The Great Artist" | Top 20 Songs | Won | |
| Global Chinese Music Awards | 2015 | Jolin Tsai | Favorite Female Singer | Won | |
| Global Chinese Music Awards | 2015 | Jolin Tsai | Top 5 Favorite Female Singers | Won | |
| Global Chinese Music Awards | 2015 | "Phony Queen" | Top 20 Songs | Won | |
| Global Chinese Pop Chart Awards | 2019 | Jolin Tsai | Favorite Female Singer – Hong Kong/Taiwan/Overseas | Won | |
| Global Chinese Pop Chart Awards | 2019 | Ugly Beauty | Best Album – Hong Kong/Taiwan/Overseas | Won | |
| Global Chinese Pop Chart Awards | 2019 | "Ugly Beauty" | Top Songs | Won | |
| Golden Horse Awards | 2023 | "Untitled" | Best Original Film Song | Nominated | |
| Golden Melody Awards | 2004 | Jolin Tsai | Best Mandarin Female Singer | Nominated | |
| Golden Melody Awards | 2004 | Magic | Album of the Year | Nominated | |
| Golden Melody Awards | 2007 | Jolin Tsai | Best Mandarin Female Singer | Won | |
| Golden Melody Awards | 2007 | Dancing Diva | Best Mandarin Album | Nominated | |
| Golden Melody Awards | 2007 | "Marry Me Today" | Song of the Year | Won | |
| Golden Melody Awards | 2007 | Jolin Tsai | Favorite Female Singer/Group | Won | |
| Golden Melody Awards | 2013 | Jolin Tsai | Best Mandarin Female Singer | Nominated | |
| Golden Melody Awards | 2013 | Muse | Best Mandarin Album | Nominated | |
| Golden Melody Awards | 2013 | "The Great Artist" | Song of the Year | Won | |
| Golden Melody Awards | 2015 | Play | Best Mandarin Album | Won | |
| Golden Melody Awards | 2015 | "Play" | Song of the Year | Nominated | |
| Golden Melody Awards | 2019 | Jolin Tsai | Best Mandarin Female Singer | Nominated | |
| Golden Melody Awards | 2019 | Ugly Beauty | Album of the Year | Won | |
| Golden Melody Awards | 2019 | Ugly Beauty | Best Mandarin Album | Nominated | |
| Golden Melody Awards | 2019 | "Womxnly" | Song of the Year | Won | |
| Golden Melody Awards | 2019 | Starr Chen, Jolin Tsai for "Ugly Beauty" | Best Single Producer | Nominated | |
| Golden Melody Awards | 2024 | Jolin Tsai, Richard Craker for "Someday, Somewhere" | Best Composer | Nominated | |
| Golden Melody Awards | 2026 | Jolin Tsai | Best Mandarin Female Singer | Won | |
| Golden Melody Awards | 2026 | Pleasure | Album of the Year | Won | |
| Golden Melody Awards | 2026 | Pleasure | Best Mandarin Album | Nominated | |
| Golden Melody Awards | 2026 | "Pleasure" | Song of the Year | Nominated | |
| Golden Melody Awards | 2026 | Jolin Tsai and Starr Chen for Pleasure | Best Album Producer | Nominated | |
| Golden Wolf Music Video Awards | 2024 | "Oh La La La" | Best Singing Performance | Nominated | |
| Hito Music Awards | 2004 | Jolin Tsai | Best Female Singer | Won | |
| Hito Music Awards | 2004 | Magic | Most Weeks on Chart Album | Won | |
| Hito Music Awards | 2004 | "Say Love You" | Most Weeks at Number One Song | Won | |
| Hito Music Awards | 2004 | "Say Love You" | Top Songs | Won | |
| Hito Music Awards | 2005 | Jolin Tsai | Best Female Singer | Won | |
| Hito Music Awards | 2005 | "It's Love" | Top 10 Chinese Songs | Won | |
| Hito Music Awards | 2006 | Jolin Tsai | Best Female Singer | Won | |
| Hito Music Awards | 2006 | Jolin Tsai | Most Chart Entries Singer | Won | |
| Hito Music Awards | 2006 | J-Game | Most Weeks at Number One Album | Won | |
| Hito Music Awards | 2006 | "Sky" | Top 10 Chinese Songs | Won | |
| Hito Music Awards | 2007 | Jolin Tsai | Best Female Singer | Won | |
| Hito Music Awards | 2007 | Jolin Tsai | Favorite Female Singer | Won | |
| Hito Music Awards | 2007 | Jolin Tsai | Favorite Debut | Won | |
| Hito Music Awards | 2007 | Dancing Diva | Most Weeks on Chart Album | Won | |
| Hito Music Awards | 2007 | "Dancing Diva" | Top 10 Chinese Songs | Won | |
| Hito Music Awards | 2007 | "Marry Me Today" | Top 10 Chinese Songs | Won | |
| Hito Music Awards | 2007 | "Marry Me Today" | Favorite Song | Won | |
| Hito Music Awards | 2008 | Jolin Tsai | Best Female Singer | Won | |
| Hito Music Awards | 2008 | Agent J | Most Weeks on Chart Album | Won | |
| Hito Music Awards | 2008 | "Sun Will Never Set" | Top 10 Chinese Songs | Won | |
| Hito Music Awards | 2008 | "Sun Will Never Set" | Favorite Song | Won | |
| Hito Music Awards | 2010 | Butterfly | Most Weeks at Number One Album | Won | |
| Hito Music Awards | 2010 | "Real Man" | Top 10 Chinese Songs | Won | |
| Hito Music Awards | 2013 | Jolin Tsai | Best Female Singer | Won | |
| Hito Music Awards | 2013 | Jolin Tsai | Global Mandarin Outstanding Artist | Won | |
| Hito Music Awards | 2013 | Jolin Tsai | Global Media Recommended Artist | Won | |
| Hito Music Awards | 2013 | "The Great Artist" | Top 10 Chinese Songs | Won | |
| Hito Music Awards | 2015 | Jolin Tsai | Best Female Singer | Won | |
| Hito Music Awards | 2015 | Play | Most Weeks at Number One Album | Won | |
| Hito Music Awards | 2015 | "Play" | Top 10 Chinese Songs | Won | |
| Hito Music Awards | 2015 | "Play" | Hit FM Top 100 Number One Song | Won | |
| Hito Music Awards | 2019 | Jolin Tsai | Best Female Singer | Won | |
| Hito Music Awards | 2019 | Ugly Beauty | Most Weeks at Number One Album | Won | |
| Hito Music Awards | 2019 | "Ugly Beauty" | Top 10 Chinese Songs | Won | |
| Hito Music Awards | 2019 | "Ugly Beauty" | Hit FM Top 100 Number One Song | Won | |
| Hito Music Awards | 2023 | "Untitled" | Most Popular Digital Single | Won | |
| Hito Music Awards | 2026 | Jolin Tsai | Best Female Singer | Won | |
| Hito Music Awards | 2026 | Jolin Tsai | Favorite Female Singer | Won | |
| Hito Music Awards | 2026 | Jolin Tsai | Most Chart Entries Singer | Won | |
| Hito Music Awards | 2026 | "Pleasure" | Top 10 Chinese Songs | Won | |
| IFPI Hong Kong Top Sales Music Award | 2004 | Magic | Top 10 Selling Albums – Mandarin | Won | |
| IFPI Hong Kong Top Sales Music Award | 2005 | Castle | Top 10 Selling Albums – Mandarin | Won | |
| IFPI Hong Kong Top Sales Music Award | 2007 | Dancing Diva | Top 10 Selling Albums – Mandarin | Won | |
| J. S. G. Selections | 2003 | "Say Love You" | Favorite Mandarin Song – Quarter 2 | Won | |
| J. S. G. Selections | 2009 | "Real Man" | Favorite Mandarin Song – Part 1 | Won | |
| KKBox Music Awards | 2006 | Jolin Tsai | Top Female Singer | Won | |
| KKBox Music Awards | 2006 | J-Game | Top 10 Albums | Won | |
| KKBox Music Awards | 2006 | "Overlooking Purposely" | Top 10 Songs | Won | |
| KKBox Music Awards | 2006 | "Sky" | Top 10 Karaoke Songs | Won | |
| KKBox Music Awards | 2007 | Jolin Tsai | Top Female Singer | Won | |
| KKBox Music Awards | 2007 | Dancing Diva | Top 10 Albums | Won | |
| KKBox Music Awards | 2007 | "A Wonder in Madrid" | Most Consecutive Weeks at Number One Song | Won | |
| KKBox Music Awards | 2007 | "A Wonder in Madrid" | Top 20 Songs | Won | |
| KKBox Music Awards | 2007 | "Pretence" | Top 20 Songs | Won | |
| KKBox Music Awards | 2007 | "Dancing Diva" | Top 20 Songs | Won | |
| KKBox Music Awards | 2008 | Jolin Tsai | Best Female Singer | Won | |
| KKBox Music Awards | 2008 | Jolin Tsai | Top 10 Singers | Won | |
| KKBox Music Awards | 2009 | Agent J | Top 20 Mandarin Albums | Won | |
| KKBox Music Awards | 2009 | Love Exercise | Top 10 Saved Albums | Won | |
| KKBox Music Awards | 2009 | Agent J | Top 10 Saved Albums | Won | |
| KKBox Music Awards | 2009 | Dancing Diva | Top 10 Saved Albums | Won | |
| KKBox Music Awards | 2010 | Jolin Tsai | Top 10 Singers | Won | |
| KKBox Music Awards | 2011 | Jolin Tsai | Top 10 Singers | Won | |
| KKBox Music Awards | 2013 | Jolin Tsai | Top 10 Singers | Won | |
| KKBox Music Awards | 2014 | Jolin Tsai | Top 10 Singers | Won | |
| KKBox Music Awards | 2015 | Jolin Tsai | Top 10 Singers | Won | |
| KKBox Music Awards | 2016 | Jolin Tsai | Top 10 Singers | Won | |
| KKBox Music Awards | 2020 | Jolin Tsai | Top 10 Singers | Won | |
| KKBox Music Awards | 2022 | Jolin Tsai | Top 10 Singers – Foreign Language | Won | |
| KKBox Music Awards | 2024 | Jolin Tsai | Top 100 Singers | Won | |
| KKBox Music Awards | 2026 | Jolin Tsai | Top 100 Singers | Won | |
| KuGou Live Annual Awards | 2017 | Jolin Tsai | Best Singer | Won | |
| KuGou Live Annual Awards | 2017 | Jolin Tsai | Most Asia Influential Artist | Won | |
| Line Today Movie & Drama Spotlight Awards | 2025 | Jolin Tsai | Music Shining Star of the Year | Won | |
| Little Universe Podcast Awards | 2026 | Pleasure Talks | Top New Podcasts of the Year | Won | |
| MAMA Awards | 2015 | Jolin Tsai | Best Asian Artist – Mandarin | Won | |
| Metro Radio Hits Music Awards | 2003 | Jolin Tsai | Best Female Singer – Mandarin | Won | |
| Metro Radio Hits Music Awards | 2003 | "Say Love You" | Top Songs – Mandarin | Won | |
| Metro Radio Hits Music Awards | 2004 | Jolin Tsai | Best Female Singer – Mandarin | Won | |
| Metro Radio Hits Music Awards | 2004 | Jolin Tsai | Best Asian Female Singer | Won | |
| Metro Radio Hits Music Awards | 2004 | "Pirates" | Top Songs – Mandarin | Won | |
| Metro Radio Hits Music Awards | 2007 | Jolin Tsai | Best Asian Female Singer | Won | |
| Metro Radio Hits Music Awards | 2007 | Jolin Tsai | Favorite Singer | Won | |
| Metro Radio Hits Music Awards | 2007 | "Agent J" | Top Songs – Mandarin | Won | |
| Metro Radio Mandarin Hits Music Awards | 2003 | Jolin Tsai | Best Female Singer | Won | |
| Metro Radio Mandarin Hits Music Awards | 2003 | "Say Love You" | Top Songs | Won | |
| Metro Radio Mandarin Hits Music Awards | 2004 | Jolin Tsai | Best Female Singer | Won | |
| Metro Radio Mandarin Hits Music Awards | 2004 | Jolin Tsai | Best Stage Performance | Won | |
| Metro Radio Mandarin Hits Music Awards | 2004 | "It's Love" | Top Songs | Won | |
| Metro Radio Mandarin Hits Music Awards | 2005 | Jolin Tsai | Best Asian Singer | Won | |
| Metro Radio Mandarin Hits Music Awards | 2005 | Jolin Tsai | Best Stage Performance | Won | |
| Metro Radio Mandarin Hits Music Awards | 2005 | "J-Game" | Song of the Year | Won | |
| Metro Radio Mandarin Hits Music Awards | 2005 | "J-Game" | Top Songs | Won | |
| Metro Radio Mandarin Hits Music Awards | 2005 | "Sky" | Top Songs | Won | |
| Metro Radio Mandarin Hits Music Awards | 2006 | Jolin Tsai | Best Asian Singer | Won | |
| Metro Radio Mandarin Hits Music Awards | 2006 | Jolin Tsai | Best Stage Performance | Won | |
| Metro Radio Mandarin Hits Music Awards | 2006 | "Dancing Diva" | Song of the Year | Won | |
| Metro Radio Mandarin Hits Music Awards | 2006 | "Dancing Diva" | Top Songs | Won | |
| Metro Radio Mandarin Hits Music Awards | 2006 | "Pretence" | Top Songs | Won | |
| Metro Radio Mandarin Hits Music Awards | 2009 | Jolin Tsai | Singer of the Year | Won | |
| Metro Radio Mandarin Hits Music Awards | 2009 | Jolin Tsai | Best Dancing Singer | Won | |
| Metro Radio Mandarin Hits Music Awards | 2009 | Jolin Tsai | Best Stage Performance | Won | |
| Metro Radio Mandarin Hits Music Awards | 2009 | "Compromise" | Top Songs | Won | |
| Metro Radio Mandarin Hits Music Awards | 2009 | "Real Man" | Best Dance Song | Won | |
| Migu Music Awards | 2007 | Jolin Tsai | Top Selling Female Singer | Won | |
| Migu Music Awards | 2007 | "Marry Me Today" | Top Selling Collaboration | Won | |
| Migu Music Awards | 2007 | "36 Tricks of Love" | Top Selling Dance Song | Won | |
| Migu Music Awards | 2008 | Jolin Tsai | Top Selling Female Singer | Won | |
| Migu Music Awards | 2009 | Jolin Tsai | Top Selling Female Singer | Won | |
| Migu Music Awards | 2009 | Jolin Tsai | Top Album Selling Female Singer | Won | |
| Migu Music Awards | 2011 | Jolin Tsai | Most Searched Female Singer | Won | |
| Migu Music Awards | 2016 | Jolin Tsai | Best Female Singer of the Decade | Won | |
| Migu Music Awards | 2016 | Jolin Tsai | Best Female Singer | Won | |
| Migu Music Awards | 2016 | Butterfly | Top Selling Album of the Decade | Won | |
| Migu Music Awards | 2016 | "Take Immediate Action" | Top 10 Songs of the Decade | Won | |
| Migu Music Awards | 2017 | Jolin Tsai | Best Female Singer | Won | |
| Migu Music Awards | 2017 | Jolin Tsai | Best Stage Performance | Won | |
| Migu Music Awards | 2017 | "We Are One" | Top 10 Songs | Won | |
| Migu Music Awards | 2019 | Jolin Tsai | Favorite Female Singer – Hong Kong/Taiwan | Won | |
| Migu Music Awards | 2019 | Jolin Tsai | Top Appealing Female Singer | Won | |
| Migu Music Awards | 2019 | "Ugly Beauty" | Top 10 Songs | Won | |
| MTV Asia Awards | 2004 | Jolin Tsai | Favorite Artist – Taiwan | Nominated | |
| MTV Asia Awards | 2005 | Jolin Tsai | Favorite Artist – Taiwan | Nominated | |
| MTV Asia Awards | 2006 | Jolin Tsai | Favorite Artist – Taiwan | Nominated | |
| MTV Asia Awards | 2006 | Jolin Tsai | The Style Award | Won | |
| MTV Asia Awards | 2008 | Jolin Tsai | Favorite Artist – Taiwan | Nominated | |
| MTV Europe Music Awards | 2012 | Jolin Tsai | Best Asian Act | Nominated | |
| MTV Europe Music Awards | 2015 | Jolin Tsai | Best Taiwanese Act | Nominated | |
| MTV Global Mandarin Music Awards | 2017 | Jolin Tsai | Global Mandarin Artist | Won | |
| MTV Global Mandarin Music Awards | 2017 | Jolin Tsai | Favorite Female Singer | Won | |
| MTV Global Mandarin Music Awards | 2017 | "Play" | Top 10 Songs | Won | |
| MTV Mandarin Awards | 2001 | Jolin Tsai | Top 10 Singers | Won | |
| MTV Mandarin Awards | 2004 | Jolin Tsai | Top 20 Singers | Won | |
| MTV Mandarin Awards | 2005 | Jolin Tsai | Top 20 Singers | Won | |
| MTV Mandarin Awards | 2006 | Jolin Tsai | Top 20 Singers | Won | |
| MTV Video Music Awards | 2001 | "Fall in Love with a Street" | International Viewer's Choice – MTV Mandarin | Won | |
| MTV Video Music Awards Japan | 2005 | "Pirates" | Best Buzz Asia – Taiwan | Nominated | |
| Music King Awards | 2006 | Jolin Tsai | Favorite Female Singer – Taiwan | Won | |
| Music King Awards | 2006 | "J-Game" | Top 10 Songs – Mandarin | Won | |
| Music King Awards | 2007 | Jolin Tsai | Favorite Female Singer – Taiwan | Won | |
| Music King Awards | 2007 | Jolin Tsai | Best Stage Performance | Won | |
| Music King Awards | 2007 | "Dancing Diva" | Top Songs – Mandarin | Won | |
| Music Pioneer Awards | 2005 | Jolin Tsai | Favorite Female Singer – Taiwan | Won | |
| Music Pioneer Awards | 2006 | Jolin Tsai | Favorite Female Singer | Won | |
| Music Pioneer Awards | 2006 | "Dancing Diva" | Top 10 Songs – Hong Kong/Taiwan | Won | |
| Music Pioneer Awards | 2008 | Jolin Tsai | Favorite Female Singer | Won | |
| Music Radio China Top Chart Awards | 2006 | Jolin Tsai | Best Female Singer – Hong Kong/Taiwan | Won | |
| Music Radio China Top Chart Awards | 2006 | Jolin Tsai | Best Stage Performance | Won | |
| Music Radio China Top Chart Awards | 2006 | Jolin Tsai | DJ Favorite Artist | Won | |
| Music Radio China Top Chart Awards | 2007 | Jolin Tsai | Top Selling Female Singer | Won | |
| Music Radio China Top Chart Awards | 2007 | Dancing Diva | Best Album – Hong Kong/Taiwan | Won | |
| Music Radio China Top Chart Awards | 2007 | "Dancing Diva" | Top Songs | Won | |
| Music Radio China Top Chart Awards | 2007 | "Marry Me Today" | Top Songs | Won | |
| Music Radio China Top Chart Awards | 2008 | Jolin Tsai | Top Selling Female Singer | Won | |
| Music Radio China Top Chart Awards | 2008 | Jolin Tsai | Best All-Round Artist – Hong Kong/Taiwan | Won | |
| Music Radio China Top Chart Awards | 2008 | "Agent J" | Top Songs – Hong Kong/Taiwan | Won | |
| Music Radio China Top Chart Awards | 2010 | Jolin Tsai | Best Female Singer – Hong Kong/Taiwan | Won | |
| Music Radio China Top Chart Awards | 2010 | Butterfly | Best Album – Hong Kong/Taiwan | Won | |
| Music Radio China Top Chart Awards | 2010 | "Butterfly" | Top Songs – Hong Kong/Taiwan | Won | |
| Music Radio China Top Chart Awards | 2011 | Jolin Tsai | Favorite Singer – Hong Kong/Taiwan | Won | |
| Music Radio China Top Chart Awards | 2011 | "Honey Trap" | Top Songs – Hong Kong/Taiwan | Won | |
| Music Radio China Top Chart Awards | 2011 | "Honey Trap" | Top Played Radio Song | Won | |
| Music Radio China Top Chart Awards | 2013 | Jolin Tsai | Favorite Female Singer – Hong Kong/Taiwan | Won | |
| Music Radio China Top Chart Awards | 2013 | "The Great Artist" | Top Songs – Hong Kong/Taiwan | Won | |
| Music Radio China Top Chart Awards | 2015 | Jolin Tsai | Favorite Female Singer – Hong Kong/Taiwan | Won | |
| Music Radio China Top Chart Awards | 2015 | "The Third Person and I" | Top Songs – Hong Kong/Taiwan | Won | |
| My Astro Music Awards | 2010 | "Real Man" | Top Dance Song | Won | |
| My Astro Music Awards | 2010 | "Real Man" | Top 20 Songs | Won | |
| My Astro Music Awards | 2011 | Jolin Tsai | Top Female Singer – Overseas | Won | |
| My Astro Music Awards | 2011 | Jolin Tsai | Presenter Favorite Singer – Overseas | Won | |
| My Astro Music Awards | 2011 | "Honey Trap" | Top Dance Song | Won | |
| My Astro Music Awards | 2011 | "Honey Trap" | Top 20 Songs | Won | |
| My Astro Music Awards | 2011 | "Love Player" | Top 20 Songs | Won | |
| PlayMusic Awards | 2021 | "Sweet Guilty Pleasure" | Top 10 Music Videos | Won | |
| QQ Music Awards | 2014 | Jolin Tsai | Favorite Female Singer – Hong Kong/Taiwan | Won | |
| QQ Music Awards | 2014 | Myself World Tour | Best Concert Video | Won | |
| QQ Music Awards | 2015 | Jolin Tsai | Best Female Singer – Taiwan | Won | |
| QQ Music Awards | 2015 | Jolin Tsai | Favorite Female Singer – Hong Kong/Taiwan | Won | |
| QQ Music Awards | 2015 | Play | Best Album – Hong Kong/Taiwan | Won | |
| Singapore Hit Awards | 2000 | Jolin Tsai | Best New Artist – Gold | Won | |
| Singapore Hit Awards | 2003 | Jolin Tsai | Favorite Singer – Taiwan | Won | |
| Singapore Hit Awards | 2004 | Jolin Tsai | Favorite Female Singer | Won | |
| Singapore Hit Awards | 2004 | Jolin Tsai | Favorite Singer – Taiwan | Won | |
| Singapore Hit Awards | 2005 | Jolin Tsai | Best Chart Performance | Won | |
| Singapore Hit Awards | 2008 | Jolin Tsai | Asia Media Award – Female | Won | |
| Singapore Hit Awards | 2013 | Jolin Tsai | Favorite Female Singer | Won | |
| Singapore Hit Awards | 2013 | "Mosaic" | Top 10 Songs | Won | |
| South-East Music Chart Awards | 2005 | "J-Game" | Top 10 Songs – Taiwan | Won | |
| Southern Music Festival | 2004 | "Prague Square" | Top 10 Songs | Won | |
| Southern Music Festival | 2015 | Jolin Tsai | Best Dancing Singer | Won | |
| Super Star | 2010 | Jolin Tsai | Top 10 Female Singers | Won | |
| Super Star | 2011 | Jolin Tsai | Top 10 Female Singers | Won | |
| Tencent Music Entertainment Awards | 2021 | Jolin Tsai | Best Female Singer – Hong Kong/Taiwan | Won | |
| Tencent Music Entertainment Awards | 2021 | "Stars Align" | Top 10 Songs | Won | |
| Tencent Music Entertainment Awards | 2023 | Jolin Tsai | Most Influential Female Singer – Hong Kong/Taiwan | Won | |
| Tencent Music Entertainment Awards | 2023 | "Equal in the Darkness" | Top Cross-Border Collaboration Single | Won | |
| Tencent Music Entertainment Awards | 2025 | Jolin Tsai | Most Influential Female Singer – Hong Kong/Taiwan | Won | |
| Tencent Music Entertainment Awards | 2025 | Ugly Beauty World Tour | Concert of the Year | Won | |
| Tencent Music Entertainment Awards | 2026 | Jolin Tsai | Most Influential Female Singer – Hong Kong/Taiwan | Won | |
| Tencent Stars Awards | 2008 | Jolin Tsai | Top Female Singer – Hong Kong/Taiwan | Won | |
| Tencent Stars Awards | 2010 | Jolin Tsai | Favorite Female Singer – Hong Kong/Taiwan | Won | |
| Top 10 Stars Award | 2010 | Jolin Tsai | Top 10 Stars | Won | |
| Top 10 Stars Award | 2011 | Jolin Tsai | Top 10 Stars | Won | |
| Top 10 Stars Award | 2012 | Jolin Tsai | Top 10 Stars | Won | |
| Top 10 Stars Award | 2013 | Jolin Tsai | Top 10 Stars | Won | |
| Top 10 Stars Award | 2014 | Jolin Tsai | Top 10 Stars | Won | |
| Top Chinese Music Awards | 2001 | "Don't Stop" | Best Dance Song – Hong Kong/Taiwan | Won | |
| Top Chinese Music Awards | 2004 | "Say Love You" | Top 10 Songs – Hong Kong/Taiwan | Won | |
| Top Chinese Music Awards | 2008 | "Agent J" | Best Music Video | Won | |
| Top Chinese Music Awards | 2010 | Jolin Tsai | Most Influential Musicians of the Decade – Hong Kong/Taiwan | Won | |
| Top Chinese Music Awards | 2010 | "Butterfly" | Top 10 Songs of the Decade – Hong Kong/Taiwan | Won | |
| Top Music Chart Awards | 2000 | Jolin Tsai | Best New Artist | Won | |
| Top Ten Chinese Gold Songs Award | 2006 | Jolin Tsai | Favorite Female Singer – Copper | Won | |
| TVB8 Mandarin Music On Demand Awards | 2000 | Jolin Tsai | Best New Artist – Silver | Won | |
| TVB8 Mandarin Music On Demand Awards | 2004 | Jolin Tsai | Favorite Female Singer | Won | |
| TVB8 Mandarin Music On Demand Awards | 2004 | "Pirates" | Top Songs | Won | |
| TVB8 Mandarin Music On Demand Awards | 2007 | "Agent J" | Best Music Video Performance | Won | |
| TVBS Music Awards | 2006 | Jolin Tsai | Best Female Singer | Won | |
| TVBS Music Awards | 2006 | J-Game | Top 10 Albums | Won | |
| UFO People's Choice Awards | 1999 | Jolin Tsai | Favorite New Artist – Copper | Won | |
| UFO People's Choice Awards | 1999 | "I Know You're Feeling Blue" | Top Songs | Won | |
| V Chart Awards | 2013 | Jolin Tsai | Best Female Singer – Hong Kong/Taiwan | Won | |
| V Chart Awards | 2015 | Jolin Tsai | Best Female Singer – Hong Kong/Taiwan | Won | |
| V Chart Awards | 2015 | Play | Album of the Year – Hong Kong/Taiwan | Won | |
| Wave Music Awards | 2026 | Jolin Tsai | Best Female Singer | Won | |
| Wave Music Awards | 2026 | Pleasure | Best Pop Album | Nominated | |
| Wave Music Awards | 2026 | Pleasure | Album of the Year | Nominated | |
| Wave Music Awards | 2026 | "Pleasure" | Production of the Year | Won | |
| Weibo Night | 2018 | Jolin Tsai | Entertainers of the Year | Won | |
| Yahoo Asia Buzz Awards | 2011 | Jolin Tsai | Favorite Female Singer | Won | |
| Yahoo Asia Buzz Awards | 2013 | Jolin Tsai | Top 10 Female Singers | Won | |
| Yahoo Asia Buzz Awards | 2021 | Jolin Tsai | Favorite Female Singer – Taiwan | Won | |
