= Ugly Beauty =

2018 studio album by Jolin Tsai

- Standard edition cover

Studio album by Jolin Tsai
- Released: December 26, 2018
- Genre: Pop
- Length: 39:05
- Labels: Sony; Eternal
- Producers: Starr Chen; Razor Chiang; Howe Chen; Jolin Tsai; Øzi

Jolin Tsai chronology
Play World Tour (2018)	Ugly Beauty (2018)	Pleasure (2025)

Singles from Ugly Beauty
- 1. "Ugly Beauty" Released: December 21, 2018

Ugly Beauty is the fourteenth studio album by Taiwanese singer Jolin Tsai, released on December 26, 2018, by Sony. The album was co-produced by Starr Chen, Razor Chiang, Howe Chen, Øzi, and Tsai herself. Musically, it blends elements of pop, reggae, electronic, and hip-hop, and thematically explores the breaking of conventional beauty standards and the duality of human emotions. Tsai expressed her intent to "unveil the ugliness hidden beneath the surface of perfection and uncover the emotions that we struggle to bury".

The album was released in physical format in Taiwan, where it became the best-selling album of 2019. In Mainland China, it was released digitally and, as of April 15, 2025, has sold over 950,000 digital copies, making it the highest-selling digital album by a Hong Kong or Taiwanese female artist in the region.

Ugly Beauty received eight nominations at the Golden Melody Awards and ultimately won Album of the Year, while the track "Womxnly" was awarded Song of the Year. Following the album's release, Tsai launched her fifth concert tour, the Ugly Beauty World Tour, starting in Taipei on December 30, 2019, and concluding in Xiamen on August 18, 2024.

== Background and development ==
On July 26, 2016, media reports revealed that Tsai had begun focusing on the production of her upcoming studio album. On November 12, 2016, Tsai shared on Instagram that she had traveled to Sweden to collaborate with the music production company The Kennel, working with Hayley Aitken, Olof Lindskog, Johan Moraeus, and others. On July 18, 2017, her manager Tom Wang disclosed that the production budget for the new album would exceed NT$100 million. Tsai would also assemble her own creative team to write songs, produce music videos, and handle promotional activities.

Just two days later, on July 20, 2017, Tsai revealed that around 80% of the album's tracks had been completed. She also mentioned that she intended to adapt her music to suit her age and vocal capabilities, and confirmed a collaboration with Ashin of Mayday. On September 11, 2017, Tsai shared that two songs had already been recorded, though progress on the album was behind schedule. On March 1, 2018, she posted on Instagram that she had traveled to Karma Sound Studios in Thailand to collaborate with Richard Craker, Rhys Fletcher, Alex Sypsomos, and Stan Dubb. Later, on March 14, 2018, during the Michelin Guide Taipei 2018 Gala Dinner, she revealed that she had begun selecting the album's lead single.

On May 15, 2018, during an interview with Nylon magazine, Tsai stated that the album would contain eleven tracks, four of which had already been completed. She described the project as her "most honest album yet". On June 12, 2018, she noted that the album would feature a wide range of musical styles and was about 50% complete, with plans for a year-end release. On June 24, 2018, during an appearance on QQ Music's Big Star Show, she confirmed that the album would include her own songwriting and remain dance-focused in style. By September 12, 2018, reports indicated that Tsai had started pre-production for the new music videos. On October 4, 2018, her manager revealed that the album would be fully recorded by the end of that month, with photoshoots and music video filming to follow in November. On October 13, 2018, at Taipei Fashion Week, Tsai announced that the album was scheduled for a December release. Finally, on November 12, 2018, she confirmed via Weibo that the album recording had been completed.

== Writing and recording ==
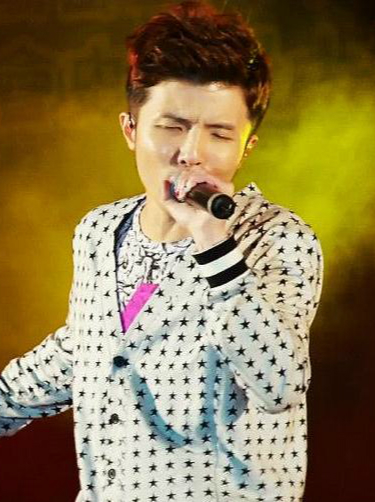
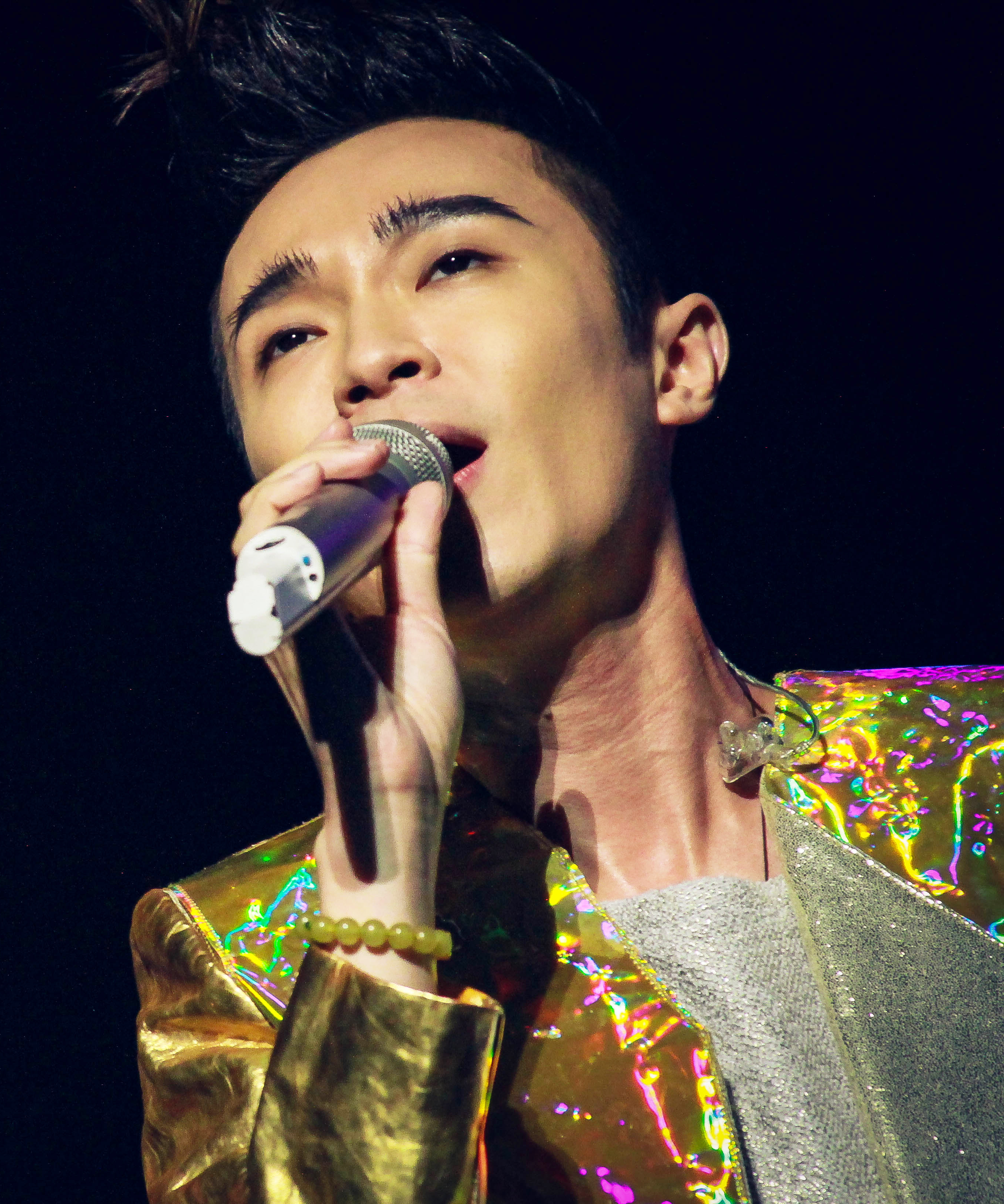
Xiao Yu (left) and Greeny Wu (right), two collaborators on the album

The lead single, "Ugly Beauty", features lyrics by Greeny Wu. Tsai revealed that she asked Wu to revise the lyrics four times. Wu responded by noting that Tsai's artistic demands had evolved from seeking external validation to pursuing deeper internal authenticity. The track blends a variety of musical elements, including playful lip-smacking effects, powerful drum and bass, and a rap segment in the latter half. Tsai also contributed to the composition and noted that it was the most time-consuming track on the album, as she explored multiple vocal tones and interpretations in the studio. "Hubby" is driven by an upbeat rock rhythm. Øzi crafted layered harmonies to enhance the song's lively atmosphere. Tsai expressed her hope that the track might one day become a modern wedding anthem.

"Womxnly" was inspired by the tragic Yeh Yung-chih incident. The song advocates for breaking gender norms and embracing all expressions of identity and appearance. It incorporates Southeast Asian instrumentation, tropical house, and dancehall influences. Emotionally nuanced and lyrically powerful, the track delivers a strong message of inclusion and empathy. "Life Sucks" is rooted in future bass. With a laid-back and slightly decadent vocal delivery, Tsai captures a sense of resignation in the face of life's everyday messes. She explained that the song is meant as a blessing for those struggling with issues they're not ready to face.

"Lady in Red" merges pop with mumble rap. Tsai uses a deeper vocal register to create a haunting atmosphere, describing the track as having the feel of a "ghost story". "Karma" rides a reggae groove. Its lyrics serve as a bold comeback to a heartbreaker, with Tsai conveying the message of living more brilliantly than those who hurt you. "Romance" combines classical piano with electronic textures, gothic rock, and R&B. Lyrically, it offers a stark yet poetic take on modern love, exploring what happens after the fairytale wedding ends. Tsai noted that the song reflects the often harsh realities that follow romantic ideals. "Sweet Guilty Pleasure" is built on bounce music. The lyrics are bold and direct, showcasing a seductive mix of sweetness and danger. Tsai described the track as a celebration of body awareness and the exploration of desire.

"Necessary Evil" uses hardcore rap to express the tension between repression and liberation. Tsai seeks to remind listeners that the fears within us are often less frightening than we imagine. The song fuses synthesizers, gothic rock, and trap to evoke a violent yet aesthetically rich mood. "Vulnerability" is rooted in retro soul-folk, with influences from hip-hop, rock, and soul. Its lyrics delve into the courage required to love, and Tsai emphasized that the track is about believing in the power of love. "Shadow Self" is based in alternative R&B and features soundscapes inspired by recurring imagery from Tsai's dreams. The lyrics draw from Carl Jung's concept of the "shadow self". Delivered in a whisper-like tone, the vocals convey raw emotion. Tsai explained that dreams represent a solitary spiritual journey, and that the song reflects a trust in the messages of the subconscious. The demo was created through an improvisational session by Huang Tzu-yuan, Mickey Lin, and Sam Ho.

== Artwork and packaging ==
On November 27, 2018, the first concept photo set for the album was unveiled under the theme "The Mouth of Truth". In one of the images, Tsai wears a red lip accessory by Shuting Qiu, paired with unsettling hand gestures and a vulnerable gaze—visually expressing the album's core message of challenging conventional standards of beauty. The shoot, along with the exclusive pre-order booklet, was created by photographer Zhong Ling and stylist Yii Ooi, featuring pieces from emerging Chinese designers including Pronounce, Shushu/Tong, Villa XRWA, and Windowsen.

On December 14, 2018, the second set of concept photos and the official album cover were released. This black-and-white-themed shoot features Tsai in a dramatic ensemble by Gareth Pugh—a black structured blazer, leather gloves, and thigh-high boots—symbolizing the legitimacy and depth of negative emotions, a central theme of the album. The imagery and official booklet were a collaborative effort by photographer Icura Chiang, stylist Tang Lai, and Tang's Formz creative team members Tungus Chan and Matthew Chan, with additional fashion pieces from brands such as Marc Jacobs and Richard Quinn.

The album's standard edition packaging was designed by Yen Po-chun, drawing inspiration from the myth of "Pandora's Box". Yen explained that the myth's themes of feminine energy and hidden hope resonated with the album's exploration of human duality—good versus evil, beauty versus ugliness. The pre-order limited edition featured four different fabric-covered box designs and included a 200-page photo diary.

== Release and promotion ==
On December 4, 2018, Tsai held a promotional event in Taipei, Taiwan, to celebrate the pre-order launch of her album. The following day, the limited pre-order edition, capped at 10,000 copies, went on sale and sold out within one minute. On December 26, 2018, Tsai hosted an album release conference in Beijing, China. In January 2019, she held two fan events in Taipei on the 20th and Kaohsiung on the 27th. By April 10, 2019, media reports revealed that the production and promotional budget for the album had exceeded NT$70 million. On May 18, 2019, Tsai held the Ugly Beauty Music Sharing Session in Shanghai, China.

=== Singles ===
On December 21, 2018, Tsai released the single "Ugly Beauty". The song debuted at number one on digital music charts in Malaysia, Taiwan, and mainland China, and ranked within the top ten in the Philippines, Hong Kong, Singapore, and other regions. On December 26, 2018, the official music video for "Ugly Beauty" premiered. Directed by Muh Chen, the video's concept centers on "Jolin Tsai judging herself", portraying a reconciliation between her past and present selves, while revisiting her career's "dark history". With a production budget of NT$15 million, it became Tsai's most expensive music video to date. Within its first week, the video topped several charts: number one on Taiwan's YouTube trending weekly chart, number one on the YinYueTai's V Chart for Hong Kong/Taiwan music video rankings, and number one on Bilibili's overall weekly chart.

On January 4, 2019, "Ugly Beauty" reached number one on the Billboard China Top 100 chart, becoming the first-ever chart-topping single since the chart's inception. Other singles from the album also performed well: "Womxnly" peaked at number seven, "Karma" at number twenty, "Lady in Red" and "Sweet Guilty Pleasure" both reached number ten, "Hubby" peaked at number eleven, and "Vulnerability" also reached number ten on the same chart. On January 31, 2019, "Ugly Beauty" was awarded the number one spot on Taiwan's Hit FM Top 100 Singles chart, making Tsai the artist with the most chart-topping singles in the history of this ranking.

=== Music videos ===
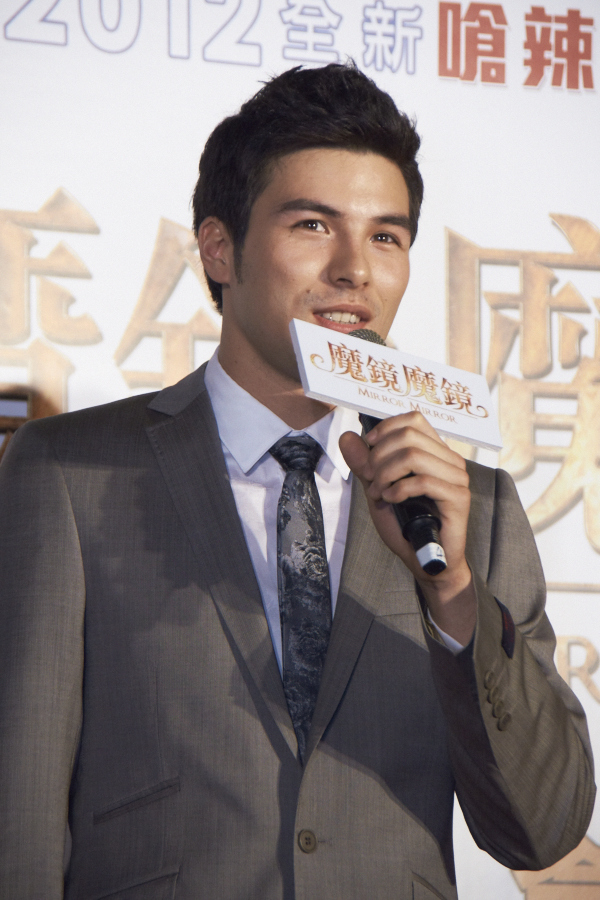
Sandra Ng (left) and Rhydian Vaughan (right), two actors who appeared in the music videos from the album

On January 28, 2019, Tsai released the music video for "Hubby", directed by Jeff Chang. The video drew inspiration from 1980s Hong Kong movies and featured appearances by actors Sandra Ng and Ryan Zheng. On February 15, 2019, Tsai unveiled the music video for "Womxnly", directed by Ryan Parma. The video achieved significant acclaim, ranking sixth on Taiwan's 2019 YouTube Most Viewed Music Videos chart. On March 12, 2019, Tsai released the music video for "Life Sucks", again directed by Jeff Chang. In its first week, the video topped the QQ Music's Peak Chart for Hong Kong/Taiwan music videos and secured the number one position on Bilibili's weekly music chart.

On April 2, 2019, the music video for "Lady in Red" premiered, directed by Cheng Wei-Hao, with a production budget of NT$15 million. The video featured Taiwanese celebrities Dee Hsu and Jacob Wang. The premiere was held at the Vieshow Cinemas in Taipei. The video quickly rose to number one on both QQ Music's overall music video chart and Bilibili's music video chart during its debut week. The Beijing News praised the video for revolutionizing the traditional approach to music videos by moving beyond simple performance synchronization, calling it a "revelation" for audiovisual works in the music industry.

On May 9, 2019, Tsai released the music video for "Karma", directed by Remii Huang. The narrative is inspired by the historical story of the "Queen of Anatahan" during World War II. This video also debuted at number one on QQ Music's overall music video chart and Bilibili's weekly music video chart. On June 26, 2019, Tsai premiered the music video for "Romance", directed by Cheng Wei-Hao, featuring actors Rhydian Vaughan and Bamboo Chen. On December 16, 2020, Tsai released the music video for "Sweet Guilty Pleasure", directed by Leo Liao and starring the popular internet personalities Mr & Mrs Gao. With a budget of NT$12 million, the video was inspired by the documentary The Girl Who Talked to Dolphins (2014), reflecting themes of communication and emotional connection.

=== Live performances ===
On December 31, 2018, Tsai performed the song "Ugly Beauty" at the Jiangsu Television's New Year's Eve Concert. On January 5, 2019, she participated in the recording of Taiwan Television's 2019 Super Star, where she performed "Ugly Beauty" and "Womxnly". On January 26, 2019, Tsai performed "Sweet Guilty Pleasure", "Ugly Beauty", and "Hubby" at the 14th KKBox Music Awards.

On April 5, 2019, Tsai appeared on the iQIYI variety show Youth With You, where she performed "Ugly Beauty" with Guan Yue, Jia Yi, Sun Zelin, Feng Junjie, and Lian Huawei. On April 11, 2019, she participated in the Chinese variety show Singer 2019 on Hunan TV, where she performed "Ugly Beauty" with Greeny Wu. On June 2, 2019, Tsai performed "Sweet Guilty Pleasure" and "Karma" at the 2019 Hito Music Awards.

On June 29, 2019, Tsai performed "Ugly Beauty" at the 30th Golden Melody Awards. On August 30, 2019, she performed "Ugly Beauty" and "Womxnly" at the 2019 Global Chinese Song Chart Awards. On November 10, 2019, she performed "Ugly Beauty" at the 2019 Suning Double 11 Gala. On December 14, 2019, Tsai performed "Ugly Beauty", "Womxnly", "Sweet Guilty Pleasure", and "Hubby" at the 13th Migu Music Awards.

On December 23, 2019, she participated in the recording of the New Year's Eve Concert hosted by CCTV, where she performed "Ugly Beauty". On June 5, 2023, Tsai appeared on the Japanese YouTube music channel The First Take, where she performed "Womxnly".

=== Touring ===
On September 20, 2019, Tsai announced that the Ugly Beauty World Tour would kick off on December 30 at the Taipei Arena. She also revealed that the tour would be a collaboration with the creative team The Squared Division. On December 31, 2019, media reports stated that the production cost for the Taipei leg alone exceeded NT$246 million, setting a new record for the highest concert production cost in the history of the Taipei Arena. However, due to the global outbreak of COVID-19, the tour's subsequent dates from January 2020 onward were postponed.

On November 20, 2020, Tsai announced the tour's relaunch at the Kaohsiung Arena in Taiwan. On March 12, 2021, she further announced five additional shows at the Taipei Arena. Due to ongoing pandemic-related restrictions, all Mainland China dates were canceled as of January 7, 2022. On October 13, 2022, Tsai confirmed the final Taiwan shows would take place from December 31, 2022, through January 2 and from January 6 to 8, 2023, at the Taipei Arena. Overall, the tour held 23 shows in two Taiwanese cities, with production costs totaling approximately NT$400 million, grossing around NT$680 million in ticket sales, and attracting about 250,000 attendees.

On June 19, 2023, Tsai announced the resumption of the Mainland China leg, beginning July 22 in Guangzhou. The tour ultimately concluded on August 18, 2024, in Xiamen. Spanning four years and seven months, the tour encompassed 63 shows across 27 cities.

== Commercial performance ==
The album set a new record on its release day for the highest single-day streaming volume of any album in Taiwan on Spotify. On March 8, 2019, Tsai became the highest-streamed female artist in Spotify Taiwan's history, thanks to the album's success. Later that year, on December 3, 2019, Spotify Taiwan released its 2019 Wrapped charts, where the album ranked second for the most-streamed album of the year. Tsai herself ranked third for the most-streamed artist overall, first among female artists, and second among Taiwanese artists.

Moreover, the album topped digital album charts across multiple regions, including Macau, Philippines, Cambodia, Malaysia, Taiwan, Hong Kong, Singapore, and Mainland China. It also secured top ten positions in digital album charts in countries such as Turkey, Vietnam, and Chile. By December 31, 2018, the album had sold over 220,000 digital copies in Mainland China, making it the second-best-selling digital album by a female artist there for the year. In 2019, it became the highest-selling digital album ever by a Taiwanese or Hong Kong female artist in Mainland China, cementing Tsai's position as the top-selling female artist in that category.

In Taiwan, the album achieved number one positions on weekly sales charts across major platforms, including Pok'elai, Eslite, Kuang Nan, Chia Chia, G-Music, Five Music, and PChome. In 2018, it ranked eighth on Pok'elai's annual sales chart, third on Kuang Nan's, fourth on Chia Chia's, second on G-Music's, and third on Five Music's.

In 2019, the album ranked third on Kuang Nan's annual sales chart, eighth on Chia Chia's, first on G-Music's, and fifth on Five Music's. It also secured second place on the 2019 YesAsia Mandarin Album Sales Chart. On December 7, 2020, Forbes reported that the album was the best-selling record in Taiwan for 2019.

== Critical reception ==
Professional ratings
Review scores
Source	Rating
PlayMusic	4.5/5 stars
QQ Music	4/5 stars
The Straits Times	4/5 stars

According to the Golden Melody Awards jury, Tsai confronts pain and public ridicule in the album, while encouraging listeners to embrace their bodies. Through upbeat dance tracks, she offers emotional healing, presenting a distinctive narrative perspective and artistic style. The CMIC Music Awards jury praised the album for its excellent production quality, coherent concept, and balanced arrangement of musical styles and track order. They noted that the album resonates with listeners and sets new trends in pop music. The jury also highlighted how the album, through its cohesive vocal performance, production, and visual presentation, creates fashionable pop symbols with a strong sense of style.

Sina Weibo music critic Zou Xiaoying wrote: "For Jolin Tsai, this is a milestone album—one that is narrative-driven while remaining at the cutting edge of fashion. It is an album that helps her reconnect with the traditional definition of a 'singer'." Sina Weibo critic Rui Li Xiu Rui added: "This album raises listeners' aesthetic expectations." Felix from PlayMusic awarded the album a score of 4.5/5, noting: "The album is strong in its overall coherence, filled with dark humor. From the tracks laden with negativity, Tsai channels her positive energy and confidence, no longer fearing public judgment but staying true to herself. Compared to her previous album Play, Ugly Beauty presents a more complete theme and better represents the artist herself." QQ Music gave the album a score of 4/5 and listed it among the 60 Best Albums of 2018. The review commented: "Ugly Beauty can be seen as the final chapter in the 'self-exploration' series that began with Myself. It begins with confidence and ends with the acceptance of imperfection, featuring internationally-influenced dance tracks while gradually stripping away sensory stimuli to reveal raw emotional lines."

Chinese Musicians Exchange Association commended the album for its meticulous production, describing it as both ambitious and creative—qualities befitting Tsai's status as a pop diva. Billie Helton, a reviewer for Everything Is Noise, called it "a great pop album" and praised it for showcasing Tsai's diverse musical talents. On Weibo, music critic Zou Xiaoying regarded the album as a personal milestone that successfully balances narrative depth with fashion-forward appeal. Critic Rui Li Xiu Rui remarked that the album elevated listeners' expectations for aesthetic quality. Felix, a music reviewer at PlayMusic, gave the album a 4.5/5 rating, applauding its cohesive theme, dark humor, and the confident, empowering energy Tsai exudes.

QQ Music rated the album 4/5, naming it one of the 60 Must-Listen Albums of 2018. They praised it as the final chapter in the Myself (2010) series, emphasizing its exploration of self-acceptance and personal discovery. The Taiwan edition of GQ listed it as one of the 12 Must-Listen Mandarin Albums of 2018, noting how it responds to Tsai's personal pain and public criticism. The Beijing News ranked it among the Top 10 Mandarin Albums of the Year, commending its introspective and outward-looking themes as well as Tsai's ever-evolving musical sophistication. Southern Metropolis Daily named it the number one in the Top 10 Mandarin album of 2018 list, while Punchline placed it number three. Taiwan's Hit FM also included it among its Top 10 Albums of 2018. The Japanese edition of CRI Online ranked it as the best Chinese-language album of the year.

Tencent Music's Waves Committee ranked the album seventh among the Best Mandarin Albums of 2010–2020, hailing it as a culmination of Tsai's artistry. They praised its engagement with topics such as diverse aesthetics, school bullying, and emotional growth—demonstrating that dance music can indeed carry profound meaning.

== Accolades ==
On March 25, 2019, Tsai was awarded Best Hong Kong/Taiwan Female Singer at the 26th Chinese Top Ten Music Awards. On May 12, 2019, the album was named one of the Top 10 Albums of 2018 by Chinese Musicians Exchange Association, and the song "Womxnly" was recognized as one of the Top 10 Singles of 2018.

On May 15, 2019, the 30th Golden Melody Awards announced its nominees, where Ugly Beauty received a total of seven nominations, making it one of the two albums with the most nominations that year. The album was nominated for Album of the Year, Best Mandarin Album, and Best Vocal Recording Album. The song "Womxnly" was nominated for Song of the Year, while the music video for "Ugly Beauty" was nominated for Best Music Video. Tsai was also nominated for Best Mandarin Female Singer, and Starr Chen and Tsai were nominated for Best Single Producer for the track "Ugly Beauty".

On June 2, 2019, the album won the Champion Album at the Hito Music Awards, where the song "Ugly Beauty" also won Top 10 Mandarin Songs and Song of the Year for 2018. Tsai was awarded Best Female Singer. On June 21, 2019, the album was named one of the Top 10 Albums of the Year at the 12th Freshmusic Awards.

On June 29, 2019, Ugly Beauty won two Golden Melody Awards, including Album of the Year, and "Womxnly" won Song of the Year, making it one of the most awarded albums at the ceremony. On July 31, 2019, the album won Best Pop Album and Best Pop Performance at the 3rd CMIC Music Awards, while "Ugly Beauty" won Best Music Arrangement and Best Single Producer. The music video for "Ugly Beauty" was awarded Best Music Video. On August 30, 2019, the album was named Best Hong Kong/Taiwan/Overseas Album of the Year at the Global Chinese Song Awards, while "Ugly Beauty" won Song of the Year, and Tsai was awarded Most Popular Hong Kong/Taiwan/Overseas Female Singer.

On December 4, 2019, Starr Chen, Razor Chiang, and Howe Chen received the Best Producer award at the Mnet Asian Music Awards for their work on the album, and Kiel Tutin won Best Choreography for the music video of "Womxnly". On December 14, 2019, Tsai won Most Popular Female Singer and Most Influential Female Singer of the Year at the 13th Migu Music Awards, while "Ugly Beauty" was named one of the Top 10 Songs of the Year. On January 18, 2020, Tsai was awarded Artist of the Year at the 15th KKBox Music Awards. On July 15, 2020, the music video for "Lady in Red" was nominated for Best Music Video at the 31st Golden Melody Awards.

== Track listing ==
No.	Title	Lyrics	Music	Producer(s)	Length
1.	"Necessary Evil" (惡之必要)	Lee Wei-jing; Razor Chiang	Razor Chiang; Starr Chen	Razor Chiang	3:48
2.	"Womxnly" (玫瑰少年)	Jolin Tsai; Ashin	Razor Chiang; Jolin Tsai	Razor Chiang	3:11
3.	"Ugly Beauty" (怪美的)	Greeny Wu	Rhys Fletcher; Stan Dubb; Richard Craker; Jolin Tsai; Starr Chen; Jennifer Hung	Starr Chen; Jolin Tsai	3:02
4.	"Karma" (你也有今天)	Lan Xiaoxie	Jolin Tsai; Hayley Aitken; Johan Gustafsson	Starr Chen	3:06
5.	"Lady in Red" (紅衣女孩)	Matthew Yen	Alex Ni; Lotus Wang; Karencici; Jeff Bova	Starr Chen	3:14
6.	"Sweet Guilty Pleasure" (甜秘密)	Adia	Jolin Tsai; Olof Lindskog; Hayley Aitken; Johan Moraeus	Starr Chen	3:27
7.	"Romance" (愛的羅曼死)	Wyman Wong	Victor Lau	Howe Chen	4:41
8.	"Vulnerability" (如果我沒有傷口)	Liao Ting-i	Xiao Yu	Howe Chen	5:01
9.	"Hubby" (腦公)	Color Lee	Rhys Fletcher; Stan Dubb; Richard Craker; Alex Syps; Jolin Tsai; Jennifer Hung	Starr Chen; Øzi	2:52
10.	"Life Sucks" (消極掰)	Tom Wang	Sam Fishman; Jazelle Rodriguez; Samuel Petersen	Razor Chiang; Starr Chen	3:02
11.	"Shadow Self" (你睡醒再看)	Huang Tzu-yuan	Mickey Lin; Jolin Tsai; Sam Ho	Howe Chen	3:41
Total length:					39:05

== Personnel ==
Song #1

- Razor Chiang – arranger, vocal effect arrangement, vocal effect
- Jolin Tsai – vocal effect
- Jansen Chen – recording engineer
- Luca Pretolesi – mixing engineer
- Andy Lin – mixing assistant engineer

Song #2

- Chen I-ju - lyrics assistant
- Razor Chiang – arranger, backing vocal arranger
- Jolin Tsai – backing vocals
- AJ Chen – recording engineer
- Luca Pretolesi – mixing engineer
- Andy Lin – mixing assistant engineer

Song #3

- A-Hao – executive producer
- Starr Chen – arranger
- Paula Ma – backing vocal arranger, backing vocals
- Jolin Tsai – backing vocals
- Jansen Chen – backing vocal recording engineer, recording engineer
- AJ Chen – recording engineer
- Luca Pretolesi – mixing engineer
- Scott Banks – mixing assistant engineer
- Andy Lin – mixing assistant engineer

Song #4

- A-Hao – executive producer, arranger
- Starr Chen – arranger
- CYH – xylophone
- Parungrung – electric guitar
- Chang Chung-lin – acoustic guitar
- Fumi – bass
- Jansen Chen – recording engineer
- Luca Pretolesi – mixing engineer
- Andy Lin – mixing assistant engineer

Song #5

- Lil Pan – executive producer, piano
- Starr Chen – arranger
- Razor Chiang – arranger
- Morrison Ma – backing vocal arranger
- Jolin Tsai – backing vocal
- Jansen Chen – recording engineer
- AJ Chen – recording engineer
- Luca Pretolesi – mixing engineer
- Andy Lin – mixing assistant engineer

Song #6

- Lil Pan – executive producer
- Starr Chen – arranger
- Morrison Ma – arranger
- Parungrung – electric guitar
- Jansen Chen – recording engineer
- AJ Chen – recording engineer
- Zachary Lin – guitar recording engineer
- Luca Pretolesi – mixing engineer
- Scott Banks – mixing assistant engineer
- Andy Lin – mixing assistant engineer

Song #7

- Howe Chen – arranger, synth, piano, backing vocals arrangement
- Dato Chang – piano
- Zooey Wonder – backing vocals arrangement, producer assistant
- AJ Chen – vocals recording engineer
- Micky Yang – piano recording engineer
- Tsai Chou-han – recording assistant
- Phil Tan – mixing engineer
- Bill Zimmerman – mixing assistant

Song #8

- Howe Chen – arranger, guitar, mellotron, bass recording engineer
- Xiao Yu – arranger, mellotron, backing vocal arrangement, backing vocals
- Dawson Chien – arranger, bass, synth bass
- Dato Chang – piano
- Alibula Jiang – drum
- Penny Pan – backing vocals arrangement
- Jolin Tsai – backing vocals
- Tien Ya-hsin – string arrangement
- Shuon Tsai – first violin
- Nick Chen – first violin
- Lo Ssu-yun – first violin
- Lu Szu-chien – second violin
- Ju Yi-ning – second violin
- Nala Huang – second violin
- Weapon Gan – viola
- Wayne Mau – viola
- Hang Liu – cello
- Micky Yang – strings recording engineer
- Jason Hsu – strings assistant engineer
- Yeh Yu-hsuan – vocals recording engineer, piano recording engineer
- Mimi Tang – vocals recording engineer, piano recording engineer
- Chief Wang – drums recording engineer
- Tsai Chou-han – drums recording engineer
- Ziya Huang – mixing engineer
- Zooey Wonder – producer assistant

Song #9

- Øzi – vocals producer, backing vocal arranger
- Razor Chiang – vocals producer
- A-Hao – executive producer, arranger
- Starr Chen – arranger
- Jolin Tsai – backing vocals
- Parungrung – electric guitar
- Zell Huang – bass
- Chief Wang – recording engineer
- AJ Chen – recording engineer
- Jansen Chen – backing vocal recording engineer
- Luca Pretolesi – mixing engineer
- Andy Lin – mixing assistant engineer

Song #10

- A-Hao – executive producer, arranger
- Starr Chen – arranger
- Jansen Chen – recording engineer
- AJ Chen – recording engineer

Song #11

- Huang Shao-yung – arranger
- Howe Chen – remix
- Hsu Yu-ying – piano
- Penny Pan – backing vocals arrangement
- Jolin Tsai – backing vocal
- Yeh Yu-hsuan – recording engineer
- Phil Tan – mixing engineer
- Bill Zimmerman – mixing assistant
- Zooey Wonder – producer assistant

== Release history ==
Region	Date	Format(s)	Edition(s)	Distributor
Various	December 26, 2018	Streaming; digital download	—N/a	Eternal
Mainland China	December 26, 2018	Streaming; digital download	—N/a	YDX
Taiwan	December 26, 2018	CD	Standard; pre-order limited	Sony
Malaysia	January 9, 2019	CD	Standard	Sony
