= Womxnly =

Song by Jolin Tsai

from the album Ugly Beauty
- Released: December 26, 2018
- Studio: Platinum (Taipei)
- Genre: Pop
- Length: 3:11
- Label: Sony; Eternal
- Composers: Razor Chiang; Jolin Tsai
- Lyricists: Jolin Tsai; Ashin
- Producer: Razor Chiang

Music video
- Womxnly on YouTube

"Womxnly" (Chinese: 玫瑰少年; pinyin: Méiguī shàonián) is a song by Taiwanese singer Jolin Tsai, featured on her fourteenth studio album, Ugly Beauty. The song was written by Jolin Tsai, Razor Chiang, and Ashin, and was produced by Razor Chiang. The track was released by Sony and Eternal on December 26, 2018. It was awarded Song of the Year at the 30th Golden Melody Awards in 2019.

== Background and release ==
The song title "Womxnly" refers to Yeh Yung-chih, a Taiwanese student who was a victim of bullying due to his gender nonconformity. Yeh attended Kaoshu Junior High School in Pingtung County, Taiwan, and was often targeted by his classmates for his distinctive gender expression. In April 2000, Yeh was found critically injured, lying in a pool of blood, and later died from his injuries after being hospitalized. His death sparked widespread discussions in Taiwanese society about gender equality education.

In November 2015, Tsai invited filmmaker Hou Chi-jan to produce the We're All Different, Yet the Same documentary series, which included a segment on Yeh Yung-chih. The documentary was shown during Tsai's Play World Tour. Tsai has long been an advocate for the LGBTQ community, using her influence in Chinese-language pop culture to speak out on their behalf. Reflecting on Yeh's story, Tsai remarked, "It's not just about being gay; when you understand yourself and live for yourself, you can reach out and help others."

In July 2017, Tsai revealed that she had invited Ashin, the lead vocalist of Mayday, to collaborate on a song for her album Ugly Beauty. By July 2018, Tsai announced that Ashin had completed the lyrics for the song, expressing her enthusiasm: "The song Ashin wrote is excellent and will likely be one of the album's main tracks. I've always wanted to experiment with different interpretations." In December 2018, Tsai released her fourteenth studio album, Ugly Beauty, which included the song "Womxnly", co-written by Ashin.

== Writing and recording ==
"Actually, from childhood to adulthood, including myself, we have all been seeking recognition from others—Does society recognize me? Do my teachers recognize me? Do my friends recognize me? Do my family recognize me? We are taught what is considered 'normal' and what is 'right'. However, we are rarely taught to cultivate an open heart and learn to accept others. It starts with accepting ourselves, and then extending that acceptance to all possibilities. Perhaps, when something unusual happens around you, it doesn't mean you're strange. When you have someone to confide in, that's the moment you begin to accept yourself. I believe that when Yung-chih shared with his mother what happened at school, he was also doubting himself. His story serves as a reminder to encourage everyone to be more tolerant, to first accept yourself. Maybe you're truly different, but so what?"

— Tsai talking about Yeh Yung-chih

The song was inspired by the Yeh Yung-chih incident. It was co-composed by Razor Chiang and Tsai, with lyrics written by Tsai and Ashin, and lyric assistance from Chen I-ju. The song was arranged and produced by Chiang. The arrangement blends tropical house, reggae, and Southeast Asian musical influences, creating a track that is both emotionally nuanced and lyrically powerful.

Tsai has long been an advocate for LGBTQ rights and human rights movements, including same-sex marriage. This song serves as a voice for people of diverse sexual orientations and appearances. Tsai remarked, "Don't live within society's framework. Being effeminate isn't necessarily bad, and masculinity isn't something you need to strive for. Regardless of whether you're male or female, gender identity doesn't have a fixed framework."

== Music video ==
In February 2019, Tsai released the music video for "Womxnly", directed by Ryan Parma. In the video, Tsai and her dancers wear two contrasting outfits: suits representing "conformity" and casual attire symbolizing "being oneself". The choreography and facial expressions are carefully synchronized with the lyrics, using long takes to convey the concept of the line, "Who traps whose soul in whose body? Who turns someone's body into a prison, imprisoning themselves?"

Tsai explained, "When I first heard the rhythm of the song and began composing, my body couldn't help but move to the beat. It made me really enjoy the moments of dancing, almost as if my body was expressing the language it wanted. Therefore, I wanted to express this original idea through a dance-based video, showcasing the beauty of the body's movements."

On December 5, 2019, the music video for "Womxnly" ranked 6th on the Taiwan's YouTube Most Viewed Music Videos Chart of 2019.

== Critical reception ==
QQ Music's critic Dai Ruo Mu Yi commented: "'Womxnly' is a well-crafted song both in terms of lyrics and composition, a heartfelt track that addresses marginalized groups. The minimalistic electronic arrangement combined with a melancholic melody may feel somewhat dry due to its predictable arrangement, but it still stands out through its intent and fluidity. The lyrics reflect the tragic story of a bullied boy, which also mirrors the experiences of many marginalized individuals who face various forms of bullying."

PlayMusic's critic Janus Shau noted: "Though 'Womxnly' is a light dance track with tropical vibes, it is also the most emotionally stirring song on the album. Thank you to Jolin Tsai for maintaining such a high standard of artistry, using music to embrace all forms of beauty, allowing more people to connect with the many forms of the soul."

Chinese Musicians Exchange Association remarked: "In response to the questions of the world, Jolin Tsai uses rhythm to evoke the concept of body liberation. It can be seen as the dance version of 'We're All Different, Yet the Same', giving strength to many within the LGBTQ community and carrying significant cultural relevance." The Golden Melody Awards recognized: "Before marriage equality was fully established, 'Womxnly' accompanied many people through difficult times. When pop music connects with a major social issue, the story becomes accessible and complete, resonating with many."

== Accolades ==
On May 12, 2019, the song was named one of the Top 10 Singles of 2018 by Chinese Musicians Exchange Association. On May 15, 2019, the song was nominated for Song of the Year at the 30th Golden Melody Awards. On June 29, 2019, the song won the Golden Melody Award for Song of the Year, making Tsai the artist with the most wins in this category in the award's history. On December 4, 2019, Kiel Tutin won Best Choreography at the 2019 Mnet Asian Music Awards for his work on the music video.

== Live performances ==
On January 5, 2019, Tsai performed the song at the 2019 Super Star organized by TTV. On August 30, 2019, she performed the song at the 2019 Global Chinese Pop Chart Awards. On December 14, 2019, Tsai performed the song at the 13th Migu Music Awards. On June 5, 2023, Tsai appeared on the Japanese YouTube channel The First Take, where she performed the song.

== Controversies ==
On September 2, 2023, Tsai held a concert in Changsha as part of her Ugly Beauty World Tour. However, she did not perform "Womxnly", a song she had previously included in every show of the tour, sparking discussion among fans. She continued to exclude the song from all subsequent tour dates.

Similarly, Mayday, who had previously included "Womxnly" in their setlist, also chose not to perform the song during their Fly to 2023 Tour in Xi'an on September 8, 2023. However, they did perform the song during their concerts in Nanjing and Chongqing, only to exclude it again at their concert in Chengdu.

== Charts ==
=== Weekly charts ===
Chart (2018–2019)	Peak position
China (Billboard)	11
China (Tencent)	15

== Personnel ==
- Chen I-ju – lyric assistance
- Razor Chiang – backing vocal arrangement
- Jolin Tsai – backing vocals
- AJ Chen – recording engineering
- Platinum Studio – recording studio
- Luca Pretolesi – mixing engineering
- Andy Lin – mixing engineering assistance
- Studio DMI – mixing studio

== See also ==
- LGBTQ rights in Taiwan
- Sexual diversity
