= Ugly Beauty World Tour =

2019–2024 concert tour by Jolin Tsai

- Tour by Jolin Tsai
- Location: Taiwan; China
- Associated album: Ugly Beauty
- Start date: December 30, 2019
- End date: August 18, 2024
- No. of shows: 63

Jolin Tsai concert chronology
- Play World Tour (2015–2016); Ugly Beauty World Tour (2019–2024); Pleasure World Tour (2025–2027)

The Ugly Beauty World Tour (Chinese: Ugly Beauty世界巡迴演唱會) is the fifth concert tour by Taiwanese singer Jolin Tsai. It began on December 30, 2019, at the Taipei Arena in Taipei, Taiwan, and concluded on August 18, 2024, at the Erget Stadium in Xiamen, China. Spanning four years and seven months, the tour included 63 shows across 27 cities in Asia.

== Background ==
On February 28, 2018, Taiwan's Next Magazine reported that Tsai would cancel her planned concert at the Taipei Arena scheduled for August of that year due to health concerns. Her manager, Tom Wang, explained that the album was originally set for release at the end of the previous year, followed by a tour. However, the album's launch was delayed until the summer, pushing the tour to the following year at the earliest. On March 14, 2018, while attending the Michelin Guide Taipei 2018 Gala Dinner, Tsai shared that she had already begun conceptualizing her new tour.

On December 26, 2018, she released her fourteenth studio album, Ugly Beauty. Later, on May 18, 2019, during the Ugly Beauty Music Sharing Session held in Shanghai, China, Tsai revealed that the tour concept was complete and that she planned to launch it within the year. On August 4, 2019, Apple Daily reported that she was expected to kick off her new tour at the Taipei Arena in late December, with her manager confirming that they were in the process of securing dates and would soon share good news.

== Development ==
On September 20, 2019, Tsai officially announced her fifth concert tour, the Ugly Beauty World Tour, set to kick off on December 30 at the Taipei Arena. She revealed a collaboration with creative team The Squared Division and stated that the tour would "break the rules" and deliver an intense, sensory experience. The concept aimed to bring the album's striking visuals to life on stage, creating a whimsical "Ugly Beauty fantasy world" while reinterpreting classic songs from her 20-year career.

On November 19, 2019, Tsai traveled to Los Angeles to rehearse with 16 dancers for 12 days. Then, on December 28, 2019, media reported that she had rented New Taipei City's Xinzhuang Gymnasium for five days of rehearsals. It was also revealed that the first five Taipei shows would be filmed for a live video release. On December 31, 2019, it was reported that the production cost for the first five Taipei concerts exceeded NT$246 million, setting a new record for the most expensive concert series held at the Taipei Arena.

In January 2020, following the outbreak of the global COVID-19 pandemic, the remaining tour dates were postponed. On October 5. 2020, Tsai announced the tour would resume on November 20 at Kaohsiung Arena. On December 22, 2020, she confirmed additional Taipei dates for the following year, and on March 12, 2021, announced further shows at the Taipei Arena in April. On January 7, 2022, all scheduled performances in Mainland China were canceled due to the pandemic, with plans to reschedule once the situation stabilized.

On June 22, 2022, media reports indicated that additional Taipei shows were planned for the end of the year. On October 13, 2022, Tsai announced that the final Taiwan shows of the tour would be held on December 31 at the Taipei Arena. On January 8, 2023, it was reported that the Taiwan leg of the tour had a production cost of approximately NT$400 million, earned NT$680 million in box office revenue, and attracted a total audience of 250,000.

On January 22, 2023, media outlets suggested the tour would likely expand internationally by mid-year. On April 6, 2023, Tsai's manager confirmed they had received overseas invitations and were assessing scheduling options. On April 28, 2023, it was reported that the tour was expected to launch in Mainland China in July, which Tsai later confirmed on Weibo. On May 4, 2023, she disclosed that her team was coordinating schedules for the upcoming shows. On June 19, 2023, Tsai announced that the Mainland China leg of the tour would begin on July 22 in Guangzhou.

== Commercial reception ==
At 11:28 AM on October 12, 2019, tickets for the first five Taipei shows sold out within just three minutes. Scalpers later resold tickets at inflated prices ranging from NT$69,000 to NT$103,500, sparking outrage among fans. The organizer, Super Dome, called on fans to reject scalped tickets and vowed to identify and void any that were confirmed to be resold illegally. According to the TixCraft ticketing system, all six shows had officially sold out by 11:31 AM. Additional tickets from incomplete transactions were released at 2:00 PM and sold out again within one minute.

On December 15 of the same year, tickets for the Kaohsiung shows went on sale at 12:15 PM, with all 30,000 tickets selling out within five minutes. On January 18, 2020, an additional two shows in Kaohsiung (scheduled for May 9 and 10) went on sale at 12:16 PM, and 20,000 tickets were again snapped up in five minutes. On October 24, 2020, tickets for the November 20 Kaohsiung show were released at 1:26 PM, and all 10,000 tickets sold out in just two minutes.

On March 28, 2021, the additional Taipei shows went on sale at 3:28 PM, with 55,000 tickets selling out in five minutes. On November 5, 2022, tickets for the final Taipei shows were released at 3:28 PM, and 66,000 tickets sold out in just six minutes.

== Critical reception ==
Kenny Tso, a music critic for United Daily News, praised Tsai as a leading figure in the Chinese-speaking music scene for her singing and dancing performances. He noted that she has created a high-caliber production that exceeded expectations, and based on audience reactions and critical acclaim, it has undoubtedly received widespread praise.

In 2024 Annual Music Industry Report released by the Institute of Media Communication Systems Engineering, jointly established by China Media Group and Beijing Normal University, the tour was recognized as Most Influential Concert of the Year and Top 10 Performances of the Year.

== Accolades ==
On August 24, 2025, the tour was awarded Concert of the Year at the 6th Tencent Music Entertainment Awards.

== Recording ==
On January 16, 2023, media reports revealed that the live video album for the tour had completed video editing and had entered the music post-production phase, with a planned release later that year. On October 15, 2024, during a Balvenie event, Tsai mentioned that the album would be released. However, the meticulous refinement process was still ongoing, and the exact release date had yet to be confirmed.

== Set list ==
The following set list was obtained from the concert held on December 30, 2019, in Taipei, Taiwan. It does not represent all concerts for the duration of the tour.

Act 1: The Orphan

1. "Necessary Evil"
2. "Sweet Guilty Pleasure"
3. "The Spirit of Knight"
4. "Miss Trouble"

Act 2: Unconscious Desire

5. "Lady in Red"
6. "Honey Trap"
7. "Medusa"
8. "Agent J"
9. "Real Man"
10. "Mr. Q"
11. "Bravo Lover"

Act 3: Unhinged

12. "The Great Artist"
13. "J-Game"
14. "36 Tricks of Love"
15. "Overlooking Purposely"
16. "I'm Not Yours"

Act 4: Innocent Minds

17. "Sun Will Never Set"
18. "Don't Stop"
19. "Hubby"
20. "Say Love You"
21. "Karma"
22. "Fantasy"

Act 5: Disclosure

23. "Rewind"
24. "Sky"
25. "Can't Speak Clearly"
26. "Romance"
27. "Vulnerability"
28. "The Smell of Lemon Grass"
29. "Life Sucks"
30. "Prague Square"
31. "Love Love Love"

Act 6: Heroic Emergence

32. "Dancing Diva"
33. "Dr. Jolin"
34. "Magic"
35. "Play"
36. "Womxnly"
37. "Ugly Beauty"
Notes
- During the second concert in Taipei, Tsai performed "Pretence", "Priceless", "I Know You're Feeling Blue", "Compromise", and "Are You Happy".
- During the third concert in Taipei, Tsai performed "Rewind" and "Little Love Song" with Greeny Wu.
- During the fourth concert in Taipei, Tsai performed "Greatest Love of All", and performed "Say Love You" and "Light Years Away" with G.E.M.
- During the fifth concert in Taipei, Tsai performed "I", "Pretence", "Priceless", "I Know You're Feeling Blue", and "Compromise".
- During the sixth concert in Taipei, Tsai performed "The Prologue", "Pretence", "Priceless", "I Know You're Feeling Blue", and "Compromise", and performed "Sky" and "This Is Love" with Mayday, but didn't perform "Can't Speak Clearly".
- During the first concert in Kaohsiung, Tsai performed "Fear-Free", "Pretence", "Priceless", "I Know You're Feeling Blue", "Compromise", and "Peter & Mary", but didn't perform "Can't Speak Clearly" or "Romance".
- During the second concert in Kaohsiung, Tsai performed "Your Name Engraved Herein", "Pretence", "Priceless", "I Know You're Feeling Blue", "Compromise", and "Peter & Mary", but didn't perform "Can't Speak Clearly" or "Romance".
- During the third concert in Kaohsiung, Tsai performed "Your Name Engraved Herein", "Pretence", "Priceless", "I Know You're Feeling Blue", "Compromise", and "Peter & Mary", and performed "Hot Chick", "Play", and "Big Thing" with MJ116, but didn't perform "Can't Speak Clearly" or "Romance".
- During the fourth concert in Kaohsiung, Tsai performed "Back Here Again", "Pretence", "Priceless", "I Know You're Feeling Blue", and "Compromise", and performed "Your Name Engraved Herein" with Hebe Tien, but didn't perform "Sky", "Can't Speak Clearly", "Romance", or "Vulnerability".
- During the fifth concert in Kaohsiung, Tsai performed "Your Name Engraved Herein", "I", "Back Here Again", "Pretence", "Priceless", "I Know You're Feeling Blue", and "Compromise", and performed "Last Dance" and "Rewind" with Wu Bai, but didn't perform "Romance", "Vulnerability", or "The Smell of Lemon Grass".
- During the sixth concert in Kaohsiung, Tsai performed "Your Name Engraved Herein", "On Happiness Road", "Pretence", "Priceless", "I Know You're Feeling Blue", and "Compromise", and performed "Mr. Q" and "Back Here Again" with Dee Hsu, but didn't perform "Romance", "Vulnerability", or "The Smell of Lemon Grass".
- During the seventh concert in Taipei, Tsai performed "I Know You're Feeling Blue", "The Distance of Love", "Only You", "Pretence", "Priceless", "Compromise", and "Stars Align", but didn't perform "Karma", "Romance", "The Smell of Lemon Grass", or "Magic".
- During the eighth concert in Taipei, Tsai performed "I Know You're Feeling Blue", "The Distance of Love", "Singlehood Plague", "I", "Wandering Poet", "Pretence", "Priceless", "Compromise", and "Stars Align", but didn't perform "Karma", "Sky", "Can't Speak Clearly", "Romance", "The Smell of Lemon Grass", or "Magic".
- During the ninth concert in Taipei, Tsai performed "I Know You're Feeling Blue", "The Distance of Love", "Wandering Poet", "Alone", "Pretence", "Priceless", "Compromise", and "Stars Align", and performed "Singlehood Plague" and "Waves Wandering" with EggPlantEgg, but didn't perform "Karma", "Sky", "Can't Speak Clearly", "Romance", "The Smell of Lemon Grass", or "Magic".
- During the tenth concert in Taipei, Tsai performed "Say Meow Meow", "Alone", "This Love", "Pretence", "Priceless", "I Know You're Feeling Blue", "Compromise", and "Stars Align", but didn't perform "Karma", "Sky", "Can't Speak Clearly", "Romance", "The Smell of Lemon Grass", or "Magic".
- During the eleventh concert in Taipei, Tsai performed "Singlehood Plague", "Alone", "The Third Person and I", "Pretence", "Priceless", "I Know You're Feeling Blue", "Compromise", and "Stars Align", and performed "Can't Speak Clearly" and "What's Wrong" with Eric Chou, but didn't perform "Karma", "Sky", "Romance", "The Smell of Lemon Grass", or "Magic".
- During the twelfth concert in Taipei, Tsai performed "Equal in the Darkness" (Mandarin version), "Fear-Free", "Untitled", "Priceless", "I Know You're Feeling Blue", "Compromise", "Pirates", and "Stars Align", but didn't perform "Karma", "Can't Speak Clearly", "Romance", "The Smell of Lemon Grass", "Prague Square", or "Magic".
- During the thirteenth concert in Taipei, Tsai performed "Equal in the Darkness" (Mandarin version), "Fear-Free", "Untitled", "Priceless", "A Wonder in Madrid", "Pirates", and "Stars Align", but didn't perform "Karma", "Sky", "Romance", "Prague Square", or "Magic".
- During the fourteenth concert in Taipei, Tsai performed "Fear-Free", "Untitled", "Nothing Left to Say", "Exclusive Myth", "Blame It on the Age", "Habitual Betrayal", "Pirates", and "Stars Align", and performed "Equal in the Darkness" (Mandarin version) and "Red Scarf" with William Wei, but didn't perform "Karma", "Sky", "Can't Speak Clearly", "Romance", "The Smell of Lemon Grass", "Prague Square", or "Magic".
- During the fifteenth concert in Taipei, Tsai performed "Equal in the Darkness" (Mandarin version), "Fear-Free", "It's Love", "Greek Girl by the Wishing Pond", "You Gotta Know", "Pirates", and "Stars Align", and performed "Untitled" and "Rooftop" with Nicky Lee, but didn't perform "Karma", "Sky", "Can't Speak Clearly", "Romance", "The Smell of Lemon Grass", "Prague Square", or "Magic".
- During the sixteenth concert in Taipei, Tsai performed "A Wonder in Madrid", "It's Love", "Greek Girl by the Wishing Pond", "You Gotta Know", "Pirates", and "Stars Align", but didn't perform "Karma", "Sky", "Can't Speak Clearly", "Romance", "The Smell of Lemon Grass", "Prague Square", or "Magic".
- During the seventeenth concert in Taipei, Tsai performed "Phony Queen", "A Wonder in Madrid", "Fall in Love with a Street", "Greek Girl by the Wishing Pond", "You Gotta Know", "Pirates", and "Stars Align", but didn't perform "Karma", "Sky", "Can't Speak Clearly", "Romance", "The Smell of Lemon Grass", "Prague Square", or "Magic".
- During the concert in Guangzhou, Tsai performed "Pretence", "Priceless", "I Know You're Feeling Blue", and "Compromise".
- During the first concert in Shanghai, Tsai performed "Wandering Poet", "Alone", "Pretence", "Priceless", "I Know You're Feeling Blue", and "Compromise", but didn't perform "Romance" or "Vulnerability".
- During the second concert in Shanghai, Tsai performed "A Wonder in Madrid", "Pretence", "Priceless", "I Know You're Feeling Blue", "Compromise", "Greek Girl by the Wishing Pond", "Because of You", "Feel Your Presence", "You Gotta Know", and "Stars Align", but didn't perform "Karma", "Can't Speak Clearly", "Romance", "Vulnerability", or "Magic".
- During the concert in Wuhan, Tsai performed "Pretence", "Priceless", "I Know You're Feeling Blue", and "Compromise", but didn't perform "Romance".
- During the concert in Nanning, Tsai performed "A Wonder in Madrid", "Untitled", "Shadow Self", "I", "Pretence", "Priceless", "I Know You're Feeling Blue", and "Compromise", but didn't perform "Karma", "Can't Speak Clearly", "Romance", or "Vulnerability".
- During the concert in Fuzhou, Tsai performed "A Wonder in Madrid", "Fear-Free", "Alone", "Pretence", "Priceless", "I Know You're Feeling Blue", "Compromise", and "Nothing Left to Say", but didn't perform "Karma", "Can't Speak Clearly", "Romance", or "Vulnerability".
- During the concert in Shenzhen, Tsai performed "It's Love", "Blame It on the Age", "Habitual Betrayal", "Pretence", "Priceless", "I Know You're Feeling Blue", "Compromise", and "Stars Align", but didn't perform "Karma", "Romance", "Vulnerability", or "Magic".
- During the concert in Changsha, Tsai performed "Take Immediate Action", "Mosaic", "Fake Confess", "Be You for a Day", "Missing You", "Pretence", "Priceless", "I Know You're Feeling Blue", "Compromise", and "Stars Align", but didn't perform "Karma", "Can't Speak Clearly", "Romance", "Vulnerability", or "Womxnly".
- During the concert in Zhengzhou, Tsai performed "Journey", "Real Hurt", "If You Don't Want", "Love in the Shape of a Heart", "Pretence", "Priceless", "I Know You're Feeling Blue", "Compromise", "The Third Person and I", "Pirates", and "Stars Align", but didn't perform "Karma", "Can't Speak Clearly", "Romance", "Vulnerability", "Prague Square", or "Womxnly".
- During the first concert in Hefei, Tsai performed "Ideal State", "Kaleidoscope", "Heart Breaking Day", "Are You Happy", "Color Photos", "Pretence", "Priceless", "I Know You're Feeling Blue", "Compromise", and "Stars Align", but didn't perform "Karma", "Can't Speak Clearly", "Romance", or "Womxnly".
- During the concert in Chengdu, Tsai performed "Phony Queen", "I", "Heart Breaking Day", "Pretence", "Priceless", "I Know You're Feeling Blue", "Compromise", "Fall in Love with a Street", "Singlehood Plague", "Kaleidoscope", "Butterfly", and "Stars Align", but didn't perform "Karma", "Can't Speak Clearly", "Romance", "Vulnerability", or "Womxnly".
- During the concert in Foshan, Tsai performed "Oh La La La", "Untitled", "Repeated Note", "Alone", "Exclusive Myth", "Nothing Left to Say", "Pretence", "Priceless", "I Know You're Feeling Blue", "Compromise", "Signature Gesture", and "Stars Align", but didn't perform "Karma", "Can't Speak Clearly", "Romance", "Dr. Jolin", or "Womxnly".
- During the second concert in Shenzhen, Tsai performed "Oh La La La", "Spying on You Behind the Fence", "Pretence", "Priceless", "I Know You're Feeling Blue", "Compromise", "Signature Gesture", and "Stars Align", but didn't perform "Karma", "Romance", "Vulnerability", "Dr. Jolin", or "Womxnly".
- During the concert in Guiyang, Tsai performed "Oh La La La", "Phony Queen", "Parachute", "Sweet and Sour", "The Prologue", "It's Love", "Pretence", "Priceless", "I Know You're Feeling Blue", "Compromise", "Signature Gesture", and "Stars Align", but didn't perform "Karma", "Fantasy", "Sky", "Can't Speak Clearly", "Romance", "Vulnerability", "Dr. Jolin", or "Womxnly".
- During the concert in Wenzhou, Tsai performed "Oh La La La", "Parachute", "Sweet and Sour", "The Finale", "If You Said Love Me on That Day", "The Third Person and I", "I Love, I Embrace", "Pretence", "Priceless", "I Know You're Feeling Blue", "Compromise", "Pirates", "Signature Gesture", and "Stars Align", but didn't perform "Karma", "Sky", "Can't Speak Clearly", "Romance", "Vulnerability", "Prague Square", "Dr. Jolin", or "Womxnly".
- During the first concert in Chongqing, Tsai performed "Oh La La La", "Love in the Shape of a Heart", "If You Don't Want", "Accompany with Me", "Gravity", "The Third Person and I", "I Love, I Embrace", "Pretence", "Priceless", "I Know You're Feeling Blue", "Compromise", "Signature Gesture", "Butterfly", and "Stars Align", but didn't perform "Karma", "Sky", "Can't Speak Clearly", "Romance", "Vulnerability", "Dr. Jolin", "Magic", or "Womxnly".
- During the second concert in Chongqing, Tsai performed "Oh La La La", "Slave Ship", "Rope on Vest", "Habitual Betrayal", "Mosaic", "The Third Person and I", "I Love, I Embrace", "Pretence", "Priceless", "I Know You're Feeling Blue", "Compromise", "Pirates", "Signature Gesture", "Butterfly", and "Stars Align", but didn't perform "Karma", "Sky", "Can't Speak Clearly", "Romance", "Vulnerability", "Prague Square", "Dr. Jolin", or "Womxnly".
- During the concert in Quanzhou, Tsai performed "Oh La La La", "Good Thing", "Words of Loneliness", "My Choice", "What Kind of Love", "Mosaic", "Pretence", "Priceless", "I Know You're Feeling Blue", "Compromise", "Signature Gesture", and "Stars Align", but didn't perform "Karma", "Sky", "Can't Speak Clearly", "Romance", "Vulnerability", "Dr. Jolin", or "Womxnly".
- During the first concert in Hangzhou, Tsai performed "Oh La La La", "I", "Heard That Love's Ever Been Back", "Fear-Free", "Pretence", "Priceless", "I Know You're Feeling Blue", "Compromise", "Signature Gesture", and "Stars Align", but didn't perform "Karma", "Sky", "Can't Speak Clearly", "Romance", "Dr. Jolin", or "Womxnly".
- During the second concert in Hangzhou, Tsai performed "Oh La La La", "Untitled", "Pretence", "Priceless", "I Know You're Feeling Blue", "Compromise", "Pirates", "Signature Gesture", "Butterfly", and "Stars Align", and performed "The Smell of Lemon Grass" and "Gravity" with Karry Wang, but didn't perform "Karma", "Sky", "Can't Speak Clearly", "Romance", "Vulnerability", "Prague Square", "Dr. Jolin", "Magic", or "Womxnly".
- During the first concert in Nanchang, Tsai performed "Oh La La La", "Fake Confess", "Emptiness", "If You Don't Want", "Missing You", "Pretence", "Priceless", "I Know You're Feeling Blue", "Compromise", "Pirates", "Signature Gesture", and "Stars Align", but didn't perform "Karma", "Sky", "Can't Speak Clearly", "Romance", "Vulnerability", "Prague Square", "Dr. Jolin", or "Womxnly".
- During the second concert in Nanchang, Tsai performed "A Wonder in Madrid", "Oh La La La", "Heart Breaking Day", "Real Hurt", "Alone", "Pretence", "Priceless", "I Know You're Feeling Blue", "Compromise", "Signature Gesture", and "Stars Align", but didn't perform "Karma", "Can't Speak Clearly", "Romance", "Vulnerability", "Dr. Jolin", or "Womxnly".
- During the concert in Luoyang, Tsai performed "Smell of the Popcorn", "Oh La La La", "Exclusive Myth", "Color Photos", "Love in the Shape of Heart", "Black-Haired Beautiful Girl", "Pretence", "Priceless", "I Know You're Feeling Blue", "Compromise", "Signature Gesture", and "Stars Align", but didn't perform "Karma", "Sky", "Can't Speak Clearly", "Romance", "Vulnerability", "Dr. Jolin", or "Womxnly".
- During the concert in Taiyuan, Tsai performed "A Wonder in Madrid", "Oh La La La", "Untitled", "Prejudice", "Gravity", "Singlehood Plague", "Pretence", "Priceless", "I Know You're Feeling Blue", "Compromise", "Signature Gesture", "Hot Winter", and "Stars Align", but didn't perform "Sweet Guilty Pleasure", "Karma", "Can't Speak Clearly", "Romance", "Dr. Jolin", or "Womxnly".
- During the concert in Jinan, Tsai performed "Greek Girl by the Wishing Pond", "Oh La La La", "Hate That I Love You", "Disappearing Castle", "Butterflies in My Stomach", "Attraction of Sexy Lips", "Dancing Forever", "Pretence", "Priceless", "I Know You're Feeling Blue", "Compromise", "Signature Gesture", and "Stars Align", but didn't perform "Karma", "Sky", "Can't Speak Clearly", "Romance", "Vulnerability", "Dr. Jolin", or "Womxnly".
- During the concert in Shenyang, Tsai performed "Take Immediate Action", "Oh La La La", "Someday, Somewhere", "Are You Happy", "Reluctant", "Missing You", "Heart Breaking Day", "Pretence", "Priceless", "I Know You're Feeling Blue", "Compromise", "Signature Gesture", and "Stars Align", but didn't perform "Karma", "Sky", "Can't Speak Clearly", "Romance", "Vulnerability", "Dr. Jolin", or "Womxnly".
- During the first concert in Changzhou, Tsai performed "Pulchritude", "Ideal State", "Oh La La La", "Be You for a Day", "Sweet and Sour", "Disappearing Castle", "Love in the Shape of Heart", "Color Photos", "Pretence", "Priceless", "I Know You're Feeling Blue", "Compromise", "Signature Gesture", "Hot Winter", and "Stars Align", but didn't perform "Sweet Guilty Pleasure", "I'm Not Yours", "Karma", "Fantasy", "Sky", "Can't Speak Clearly", "Romance", "Vulnerability", "Dr. Jolin", or "Womxnly".
- During the second concert in Changzhou, Tsai performed "Pulchritude", "It's Love", "Oh La La La", "Do You Still Love Me", "The Prologue", "Parachute", "Pretence", "Priceless", "I Know You're Feeling Blue", "Compromise", "Signature Gesture", "Hot Winter", and "Stars Align", but didn't perform "Sweet Guilty Pleasure", "I'm Not Yours", "Karma", "Fantasy", "Romance", "Vulnerability", "Dr. Jolin", or "Womxnly".
- During the second concert in Hefei, Tsai performed "Pulchritude", "Journey", "Oh La La La", "Parachute", "Love in the Shape of Heart", "Living with the World", "Because of You", "Feel Your Presence", "Pretence", "Priceless", "I Know You're Feeling Blue", "Compromise", "Signature Gesture", and "Stars Align", but didn't perform "Sweet Guilty Pleasure", "Karma", "Sky", "Can't Speak Clearly", "Romance", "Vulnerability", "Dr. Jolin", or "Womxnly".
- During the third concert in Hefei, Tsai performed "Pulchritude", "Oh La La La", "Ego-Holic", "Shadow Self", "Fall in Love with a Street", "You Gotta Know", "Black-Haired Beautiful Girl", "Pretence", "Priceless", "I Know You're Feeling Blue", "Compromise", "Signature Gesture", "Butterfly", "Hot Winter", and "Stars Align", but didn't perform "Sweet Guilty Pleasure", "Sky", "Can't Speak Clearly", "Romance", "Vulnerability", "Dr. Jolin", or "Womxnly".
- During the concert in Quzhou, Tsai performed "Oh La La La", "Friday the 13th", "Metronome", "The Finale", "The Prologue", "The Third Person and I", "Pretence", "Priceless", "I Know You're Feeling Blue", "Compromise", "Signature Gesture", and "Stars Align", but didn't perform "Can't Speak Clearly", "Romance", "Vulnerability", or "Womxnly".
- During the third concert in Shanghai, Tsai performed "Under the Sea", "A Wonder in Madrid", "Oh La La La", "Sweet and Sour", "Repeated Note", "Real Hurt", "Nothing Left to Say", "Pretence", "Priceless", "I Know You're Feeling Blue", "Compromise", "Signature Gesture", "Hot Winter", and "Stars Align", but didn't perform "Can't Speak Clearly", "Vulnerability", "Dr. Jolin", or "Womxnly".
- During the fourth concert in Shanghai, Tsai performed "Oh La La La", "Ego-Holic", "Little Child", "Fear-Free", "Lip Reading", "I Love, I Embrace", "Equal in the Darkness" (Mandarin version), "Pretence", "Priceless", "I Know You're Feeling Blue", "Compromise", "Signature Gesture", and "Stars Align", but didn't perform "Sky", "Can't Speak Clearly", "Romance", "Vulnerability", or "Womxnly".
- During the fifth concert in Shanghai, Tsai performed "Kaleidoscope", "Oh La La La", "Ego-Holic", "I", "Attraction of Sexy Lips", "Black-Haired Beautiful Girl", "Dancing Forever," "Pretence", "Priceless", "I Know You're Feeling Blue", "Compromise", "Signature Gesture", "Butterfly", "Hot Winter", and "Stars Align", but didn't perform "Karma", "Sky", "Can't Speak Clearly", "Romance", "Vulnerability", "Dr. Jolin", or "Womxnly".
- During the sixth concert in Shanghai, Tsai performed "Friday the 13th", "Oh La La La", "Missing You", "Heart Breaking Day", "Butterflies in My Stomach", "Feel Your Presence", "Love Attraction", "Kaleidoscope", "Pretence", "Priceless", "I Know You're Feeling Blue", "Compromise", "Signature Gesture", and "Stars Align", but didn't perform "Karma", "Can't Speak Clearly", "Romance", "Vulnerability", or "Womxnly".
- During the seventh concert in Shanghai, Tsai performed "Ideal State", "Oh La La La", "Ego-Holic", "Untitled", "Color Photos", "Love in the Shape of Heart", "Exclusive Myth", "Gravity", "Marry Me Today", "Pretence", "Priceless", "I Know You're Feeling Blue", "Compromise", "Signature Gesture", "Hot Winter", and "Stars Align", but didn't perform "Karma", "Can't Speak Clearly", "Romance", "Vulnerability", "Dr. Jolin", or "Womxnly".
- During the eighth concert in Shanghai, Tsai performed "Party Star", "Oh La La La", "I", "Fear-Free", "Alone", "Mosaic", "Nothing Left to Say", "Pretence", "Priceless", "I Know You're Feeling Blue", "Compromise", "Signature Gesture", "Butterfly", and "Stars Align", but didn't perform "Karma", "Can't Speak Clearly", "Romance", "Vulnerability", "The Smell of Lemon Grass", "Dr. Jolin", or "Womxnly".
- During the first concert in Xiamen, Tsai performed "Priority", "Oh La La La", "Nothing Left to Say", "Rope on Vest", "Habitual Betrayal", "Little Child", "The Third Person and I", "Pretence", "Priceless", "I Know You're Feeling Blue", "Compromise", "Signature Gesture", "Hot Winter", and "Stars Align", but didn't perform "Can't Speak Clearly", "Romance", "Dr. Jolin", or "Womxnly".
- During the second concert in Xiamen, Tsai performed "Nice Cat", "Oh La La La", "Ego-Holic", "Slave Ship", "The Finale", "Attraction of Sexy Lips", "Tacit Violence", "Peter & Mary", "Dancing Forever", "Pretence", "Priceless", "I Know You're Feeling Blue", "Compromise", "Signature Gesture", "Butterfly", "Stars Align", and "Good-Bye", but didn't perform "Can't Speak Clearly", "Romance", "Vulnerability", or "Womxnly".

== Shows ==
List of concert dates in Taiwan
Date	City	Venue	Attendance (Note: Rough numbers of attendance)	Revenue (Note: Rough numbers of revenue)
December 30, 2019	Taipei	Taipei Arena	66,000	NT$180,000,000
December 31, 2019	Taipei	Taipei Arena	66,000	NT$180,000,000
January 1, 2020	Taipei	Taipei Arena	66,000	NT$180,000,000
January 3, 2020	Taipei	Taipei Arena	66,000	NT$180,000,000
January 4, 2020	Taipei	Taipei Arena	66,000	NT$180,000,000
January 5, 2020	Taipei	Taipei Arena	66,000	NT$180,000,000
November 20, 2020	Kaohsiung	Kaohsiung Arena	60,000	NT$160,000,000
November 21, 2020 (Note: They were originally scheduled to be held on May 9–10, 15-17, 2020, but was postponed due to the COVID-19 epidemic.)	Kaohsiung	Kaohsiung Arena	60,000	NT$160,000,000
November 22, 2020	Kaohsiung	Kaohsiung Arena	60,000	NT$160,000,000
November 27, 2020	Kaohsiung	Kaohsiung Arena	60,000	NT$160,000,000
November 28, 2020	Kaohsiung	Kaohsiung Arena	60,000	NT$160,000,000
November 29, 2020	Kaohsiung	Kaohsiung Arena	60,000	NT$160,000,000
April 21, 2021	Taipei	Taipei Arena	55,000	NT$140,000,000
April 22, 2021	Taipei	Taipei Arena	55,000	NT$140,000,000
April 24, 2021	Taipei	Taipei Arena	55,000	NT$140,000,000
April 25, 2021	Taipei	Taipei Arena	55,000	NT$140,000,000
April 26, 2021	Taipei	Taipei Arena	55,000	NT$140,000,000
December 31, 2022	Taipei	Taipei Arena	66,000	NT$200,000,000
January 1, 2023	Taipei	Taipei Arena	66,000	NT$200,000,000
January 2, 2023	Taipei	Taipei Arena	66,000	NT$200,000,000
January 6, 2023	Taipei	Taipei Arena	66,000	NT$200,000,000
January 7, 2023	Taipei	Taipei Arena	66,000	NT$200,000,000
January 8, 2023	Taipei	Taipei Arena	66,000	NT$200,000,000
Total			250,000 (100%)	NT$680,000,000

List of concert dates in China
Date	City	Venue	Attendance	Revenue
July 22, 2023	Guangzhou	Tianhe Sports Center Stadium	40,000	—
July 29, 2023	Shanghai	Hongkou Football Stadium	53,109	—
July 30, 2023	Shanghai	Hongkou Football Stadium	53,109	—
August 5, 2023	Wuhan	Wuhan Five Rings Sports Center Stadium	30,000	—
August 12, 2023	Nanning	Guangxi Sports Center Main Stadium	50,000	—
August 19, 2023	Fuzhou	Haixia Olympic Sports Center Stadium	40,000	—
August 26, 2023	Shenzhen	Shenzhen Bay Sports Center Stadium	—	—
September 2, 2023	Changsha	Helong Sports Center Stadium	30,000	—
September 9, 2023	Zhengzhou	Zhengzhou Olympic Sports Center Stadium	—	—
September 16, 2023	Hefei	Hefei Olympic Sports Center Stadium	—	—
September 23, 2023	Chengdu	Dong'an Lake Sports Park Stadium	—	—
March 30, 2024	Foshan	Foshan Century Lotus Sports Center Stadium	36,000	—
April 5, 2024	Shenzhen	Shenzhen Universiade Sports Centre	40,000	—
April 13, 2024	Guiyang	Guiyang Olympic Sports Center Stadium	45,000	—
April 20, 2024	Wenzhou	Wenzhou Olympic Sports Center Stadium	—	—
April 27, 2024	Chongqing	Chongqing Olympic Sports Center Stadium	80,000	—
April 28, 2024	Chongqing	Chongqing Olympic Sports Center Stadium	80,000	—
May 4, 2024	Quanzhou	Quanzhou Straits Sports Center Stadium	—	—
May 18, 2024	Hangzhou	Hangzhou Olympic Sports Center Stadium	90,000	—
May 19, 2024	Hangzhou	Hangzhou Olympic Sports Center Stadium	90,000	—
May 24, 2024	Nanchang	Nanchang International Sports Center Stadium	40,000	—
May 25, 2024	Nanchang	Nanchang International Sports Center Stadium	—	—
June 1, 2024	Luoyang	Luoyang Olympic Sports Center Stadium	—	—
June 15, 2024	Taiyuan	Shanxi Sports Centre Stadium	41,524	—
June 22, 2024	Jinan	Jinan Olympic Sports Center Stadium	40,000	—
June 29, 2024	Shenyang	Shenyang Olympic Sports Center Stadium	60,000	—
July 5, 2024	Changzhou	Changzhou Olympic Sports Center Stadium	35,000	—
July 6, 2024	Changzhou	Changzhou Olympic Sports Center Stadium	35,000	—
July 13, 2024	Xianyang	Xianyang Olympic Sports Center Stadium	—	—
July 19, 2024	Hefei	Hefei Olympic Sports Center Stadium	—	—
July 20, 2024	Hefei	Hefei Olympic Sports Center Stadium	—	—
July 27, 2024	Quzhou	Quzhou Sports Center Stadium	—	—
August 2, 2024	Shanghai	Hongkou Football Stadium	—	—
August 3, 2024	Shanghai	Hongkou Football Stadium	—	—
August 4, 2024	Shanghai	Hongkou Football Stadium	—	—
August 9, 2024	Shanghai	Hongkou Football Stadium	—	—
August 10, 2024	Shanghai	Hongkou Football Stadium	—	—
August 11, 2024	Shanghai	Hongkou Football Stadium	—	—
August 17, 2024	Xiamen	Xiamen Egret Stadium	75,808	73,523,820
August 18, 2024	Xiamen	Xiamen Egret Stadium	75,808	73,523,820
Total			Unknown	Unknown

=== Cancelled dates ===
List of cancelled dates
Date	City	Country	Venue	Reason
February 21, 2020	Shanghai	China	Mercedes-Benz Arena	COVID-19 pandemic
February 22, 2020	Shanghai	China	Mercedes-Benz Arena	COVID-19 pandemic
February 28, 2020	Shenzhen	China	Shenzhen Bay Sports Center Arena	COVID-19 pandemic
February 29, 2020	Shenzhen	China	Shenzhen Bay Sports Center Arena	COVID-19 pandemic
March 7, 2020	Wuhan	China	Wuhan Sports Center Gymnasium	COVID-19 pandemic
March 14, 2020	Chengdu	China	Wuliangye Chengdu Performing Arts Center	COVID-19 pandemic
March 21, 2020	Nanjing	China	Nanjing Youth Olympic Sports Park Gymnasium	COVID-19 pandemic
March 28, 2020	Ningbo	China	Ningbo Olympic Sports Center Gymnasium	COVID-19 pandemic
April 5, 2020	Tianjin	China	Tianjin Arena	COVID-19 pandemic
April 11, 2020	Foshan	China	GBA International Sports and Cultural Center	COVID-19 pandemic
April 18, 2020	Zhengzhou	China	Zhengzhou Olympic Sports Center Gymnasium	COVID-19 pandemic
April 25, 2020	Jinan	China	Jinan Olympic Sports Center Gymnasium	COVID-19 pandemic
June 13, 2020	Beijing	China	Cadillac Arena	COVID-19 pandemic
June 14, 2020	Beijing	China	Cadillac Arena	COVID-19 pandemic

== Personnel ==
Adapted from the Ugly Beauty tour book.

- Super Dome – Organizer, Production Company
- Eternal Music – Production Company
- Ke Fu-hung – Producer
- Jolin Tsai – Art Director
- Tom Wang – Producer
- Ashley Evans – Producer, Creative Director, Choreography Director, Choreographer
- Antony Ginandjar – Producer, Creative Director, Choreography Director, Choreographer
- Yang Chun-chieh – Production Coordinator
- Hsieh Yun-shan – Production Coordinator
- Liu Kuan – Engineering Coordinator
- Tseng Chi-ying – Engineering Coordinator
- Kao Hui-chen – Executive Director
- Wang Pei-yun – Executive Director
- Peng Chung-hui – Administrative Coordinator
- Wu Chih-chieh – Administrative Coordinator
- Cheng Sheng-chi – Administrative Coordinator
- Kuo I-chien – Administrative Coordinator
- Starr Chen – Music Director
- A-Hao Cheng – Music Assistant Director
- Kiel Tutin – Choreography Consultant and Supervisor, Residency Choreography Supervisor (Taipei), Choreographer
- Kaylie Yee – Creative Assistant Director, Choreography Assistant Director
- Liu Ya-yun – Executive Assistant Director
- Cheng Ju-ya – Executive Assistant Director
- Blink Inc – Concert Video Producer, Animation Designer
- Grass Jelly – Animation Designer
- Serendipity Visual Studio – Animation Designer
- Lightborne – Animation Designer
- NorthHouse – Animation Designer
- Silent Partners Studio – Animation Designer
- Wild Design Studio – Animation Designer
- Mix Code – Animation Designer
- K4s Motion Studio – Animation Designer
- Yoshiki Design – Animation Designer
- Chiu Huan-sheng – Visual Executor
- Li Hsiung-lin – Visual Executor
- Hsu Yu-ting – Visual Executor
- Marco Hsu – 20th Anniversary VCR
- Ian Lin – 20th Anniversary VCR
- Cat Grass Studio – 20th Anniversary VCR
- Elsie Liao – 20th Anniversary VCR
- Yang Ching-an – Show Executor
- Chou Ping-kun – Stage Designer
- Nathan Taylor – Stage Assistant Designer, Lighting Assistant Designer
- Chou Wen-shun – Lighting Designer
- Goh Chong Yeow – Lighting Engineer
- Tsao Wen-chuan – Lighting Engineer
- Chen Kang-chien – Sound Designer
- Hung Wei-chuan – Stage Monitor
- Wu Cheng-yu – Stage Supervisor
- Lin Meng-chan – Stage Executor
- Yang Min-lin – Stage Executor
- Lin Tse-cheng – Stage Executor
- Li Ming-hsuan – Stage Executor
- Huang Chia-yuan – Stage Executor
- Pai Fang-chen – Stage Executor
- Peng Yu-chien – Ticketing
- Jay Hung – Band Leader, Keyboard
- Mike McLaughlin – Guitar
- Gabriel Beaudoin – Guitar
- Alex Edward Morris – Drum
- Brian Chiu – Bass
- Ian Lee – Programmer
- Paula Ma – Background Vocalist Director
- Chang I-hsin – Background Vocalist
- Pin Fan – Background Vocalist
- Shao Hui-yun – Background Vocalist
- Liana Blackburn – Choreography Assistant Director, Choreographer
- Zac Brazenas – Choreography Assistant Director
- Tessandra Chavez – Choreographer
- Nika Kljun – Choreographer
- Rudy Abreu – Choreographer
- Eden Estella Coleman – Dancer
- Diorrion Kiar Archer – Dancer
- Hugh Espiritu Aparente – Dancer
- Jalen Robert Forward – Dancer
- Charles Rodger Williams – Dancer
- Floris Bosveld – Dancer
- Stephen Carlos Perez – Dancer
- Dayne Christian Sempert – Dancer
- Louis Paul Di Pippa – Dancer
- Shannon Ashley Walter – Dancer
- Kaylee Ann Purtell – Dancer
- Kaitlin Reese Davin – Dancer
- Riley Patricia Groot – Dancer
- Jordan Taylor Laza – Dancer
- Elyssa Arianna Cueto – Dancer
- Oritsetsolaye Akuya – Dancer
- Jessica Rita – Ann Toatoa – Dancer
- Andy Hsu – Choreography Assistant
- Heather Picchiottino – Dance Costume Design, Concert Artist Costume Design
- Chen I – Dance Costume Manager
- Cheng Ying – Dance Costume Manager
- Chuang Pei-wen – Dance Costume Manager
- Chen I-tzu – Dance Costume Manager
- Lin Tzu-yun – Dance Costume Manager
- Hung Min-hsuan – Dance Costume Manager
- Hsia Chia-ling – Dance Costume Manager
- Chen Li-ting – Dance Costume Manager
- Hsieh Wan-hsin – Choreography Administrator
- Zhong Lin – Poster photographer
- Johnny Ho – Poster Hairstylist, Concert Hairstylist
- Ya Li – Poster Makeup Artist, Video Interlude Makeup Artist, Concert Makeup Artist
- Yii Ooi – Poster Stylist
- Yen Po-chun – Poster Main Visual Designer
- Tom Colbourne – Video Interlude Director
- Heibiemok – Video Interlude Hairstylist
- Samantha Burkhart – Video Interlude Stylist
- Wang Lei – Video Interlude Behind-the-Scenes Cinematographer
- Rino – Concert Behind-the-Scenes Cinematographer
- Ke Chun-mei – Concert Behind-the-Scenes Cinematographer
- Christine Mutton – Concert Costume Supervisor
- Lan Yu-chen – Concert Artist Costume Manager
- Lan Yu-chieh – Concert Artist Costume Manager
- Birdy Production – Concert DVD Cinematographer
- Birdy Nio – Documentary Director, Concert DVD Director
- Yen Ting – Concert DVD Director
- Kiki Shih – Documentary Producer, Concert DVD Producer
- A-Hao – Concert DVD Producer
- Friends Entertainment – News and Media Writer
- Sony Music Taiwan – News and Media Writer
- Wen Yu-min – News and Media Writer
- Lu Hsiao-hsiung – News and Media Writer
- Engineering Impact Taiwan Corp. – Engineering Coordinator, Structural Engineer, Lighting Engineer, Video Engineer
- Cheng Zhen Stage Co., Ltd. – Stage Engineer
- Lightball Taiwan – Structural Engineer
- Winly Corporation – Sound Engineerer
- CY Communications – Video Engineer
- Inshin Sound Light Co., Ltd. – Laser Engineer
- Hong Yi Tech Co., Ltd. – Special Effects Engineer
- Taiwan Show Power – Electric Engineer
- Best HD Video System – Shooting Engineer
