= Ugly Beauty (song) =

Single by Jolin Tsai

from the album Ugly Beauty
- Language: Mandarin
- Released: December 21, 2018
- Recorded: 2018
- Studio: Mega Force (New Taipei)
- Genre: Pop; electronic; trap
- Length: 3:02
- Label: Sony; Eternal
- Composers: Rhys Fletcher; Stan Dubb; Richard Craker; Jolin Tsai; Starr Chen; Jennifer Hung
- Lyricist: Greeny Wu
- Producers: Starr Chen; Jolin Tsai

Jolin Tsai singles chronology
| "The Player" (2018) | "Ugly Beauty" (2018) | "Gravity" (2019) |

Music video
- "Ugly Beauty" on YouTube

"Ugly Beauty" (Chinese: 怪美的; pinyin: Guài měide) is a song by Taiwanese singer Jolin Tsai, featured on her fourteenth studio album of the same name, Ugly Beauty (2018). It was written by Greeny Wu, Rhys Fletcher, Stan Dubb, Richard Craker, Starr Chen, Jennifer Hung, and Tsai herself, and it was produced by Starr Chen and Tsai. It was released on December 21, 2018, by Eternal as the lead single from Ugly Beauty.

The music video for "Ugly Beauty" was nominated for Best Music Video at the 30th Golden Melody Awards. Tsai and Starr Chen were also nominated for Best Single Producer for the track.

== Background ==
On March 1, 2018, Tsai revealed via Instagram that she had traveled to Karma Sound Studios in Thailand to collaborate with Richard Craker, Rhys Fletcher, and Stan Dubb. On March 14, 2018, she mentioned during the Michelin Guide Taipei 2018 Gala Dinner that she had begun selecting the lead single for her new album.

In an interview with Nylon on May 15, 2018, Tsai shared that the upcoming album would contain eleven tracks, four of which had already been recorded. She described it as her "most honest album". On June 12, 2018, she noted that the album would showcase a diverse range of musical styles, including some she had never explored before. Her manager, Tom Wang, added that the album was about 50% complete and targeted for a year-end release. During a QQ Music's Big Star Show interview on June 24, 2018, Tsai revealed that the album would include self-written material and still be primarily dance-oriented.

On September 12, 2018, media reported that pre-production for the new music video had begun. On October 4, 2018, Wang stated that the album recording was expected to be completed within the month, with cover and music video shoots to follow in November. On October 13, 2018, at the Taipei Fashion Week, Tsai announced the album would be released in December. On November 12, 2018, she confirmed on Weibo that the recording was complete.

== Composition and recording ==
"Ugly Beauty"
"Ugly Beauty" blends electronic, R&B, and hip-hop elements.

"Ugly Beauty" features lyrics by Greeny Wu, who revealed that Tsai requested four rounds of revisions before finalizing the lyrics. Wu noted that Tsai's rising standards stem not from external expectations but from her own evolving artistic vision.

Tsai also co-composed the track and described the creative process as a journey of discovering sounds that moved her. She collaborated with a diverse team, using various musical languages to convey the song's intent. The track blends electronic elements, including lip-smacking effects, punchy drum and bass, and a rap segment in the latter half.

As one of the song's producers, Tsai shared that "Ugly Beauty" took the longest to complete among all tracks on the album, undergoing multiple rewrites and re-recordings as she experimented extensively with different vocal textures and sonic directions in the studio.

== Music video ==
On December 4, 2018, Tsai announced that the music video for "Ugly Beauty" would be released on December 21. However, on December 19, 2018, she issued an apology via Weibo, informing fans that the music video's release had been postponed to December 26. On the originally scheduled date, she released a lyric video for the song, co-directed by Jimi Chou Chi-min and Yu Jing-pin.

The official music video, released on December 26, 2018, and directed by Muh Chen, centers around the concept of "Tsai judging herself", symbolizing self-reconciliation between her past and present selves. It also reflects on her so-called "dark history" since debut. With a production budget of NT$15 million, it marked the most expensive music video of her career to date. In its first week, the music video topped several charts, including Taiwan's YouTube Trending Videos, YinYueTai's music video chart (Hong Kong and Taiwan category), and Bilibili's overall ranking.

On January 1, 2019, Tsai released a dance version of the music video via her official Facebook page.

== Commercial performance ==
"Ugly Beauty" debuted at number one on digital music charts in Malaysia, Taiwan, and mainland China, and entered the top ten in regions including Philippines, Hong Kong, and Singapore. On January 4, 2019, the song topped the Billboard China Top 100 weekly chart, becoming the first-ever number-one single since the chart's launch. On January 31, 2019, the track was ranked number one on Taiwan's Hit FM Top 100 Singles, making Tsai the most frequent chart-topper in the history of that list.

== Critical reception ==
The Beijing News observed that "Ugly Beauty" employs a fragmented and straightforward mode of expression that disrupts the smooth flow typical of electronic dance music. With a melody that resists catchiness, it blends elements of R&B and hip-hop, as if deliberately constructing barriers. However, the review emphasized that Tsai does not merely indulge in superficial self-mockery; rather, she boldly tears away labels long associated with her image, revealing a determined pursuit to explore new possibilities within Mandopop music.

The CMIC Music Awards praised the song for its depth in lyrics, composition, and vocal delivery. Regarding the music video, it was commended for its ability to visually convey the song's emotional essence, complementing and expanding upon the music's message.

== Accolades ==
On May 15, 2019, the nominees for the 30th Golden Melody Awards were announced, with the music video for "Ugly Beauty" receiving a nomination for Best Music Video. Both Starr Chen and Tsai were nominated for Best Single Producer for their work on the song. On June 2, 2019, "Ugly Beauty" won two major awards at the 2019 Hito Music Awards: Top 10 Mandarin Songs and the 2018 Top Song of the Year.

On July 31, 2019, "Ugly Beauty" won three awards at the 3rd CMIC Music Awards, including Best Music Arrangement, Best Single Production, and Best Music Video for its music video. On August 30, 2019, the song was named Song of the Year at the 2019 Global Chinese Music Awards. On December 14, 2019, "Ugly Beauty" was awarded one of the Top 10 Songs of the Year at the 13th Migu Music Awards.

== Live performances ==
Tsai made a performance of "Ugly Beauty" at the 2019 Jiangsu TV's New Year's Eve Concert on December 31, 2018. She performed it at the 2019 Super Star, hosted by TTV on January 5, 2019, and at the 14th KKBox Music Awards held on January 25, 2019. On April 5, 2019, Tsai appeared on the iQIYI variety show Youth With You, where she performed "Ugly Beauty" alongside trainees Guan Yue, Jia Yi, Sun Zelin, Feng Junjie, and Lian Huaiwei. The following week, she performed the song again, this time with Greeny Wu, on the Hunan TV variety show Singer 2019.

At the 30th Golden Melody Awards on June 29, 2019, Tsai performed the song and was the closing performer of the event. She continued to perform the song at various events throughout the year including the 2019 Global Chinese Music Awards on August 30, the Suning Double 11 Gala on November 10, and the 13th Migu Music Awards on December 14. Later, on December 23, 2019, she recorded a performance of "Ugly Beauty" for the 2020 New Year's Eve Gala organized by China Media Group.

== Charts ==
=== Weekly charts ===
| Chart (2018–2019) | Peak position |
|---|---|
| China (Billboard) | 1 |
| China (Tencent) | 5 |

== Credits and personnel ==
- A-Hao – executive production
- Paula Ma – backing vocal arrangement, backing vocals
- Jolin Tsai – backing vocals
- Jansen Chen – backing vocal recording engineering
- AJ Chen – recording engineering
- Luca Pretolesi – mixing engineering
- Scott Banks – mixing assistance
- Andy Lin – mixing assistance
- Mega Force Studio – recording studio
- Studio DMI – mixing studio

== Release history ==
Release dates and formats for "Ugly Beauty"
| Region | Date | Format(s) | Distributor |
|---|---|---|---|
| Various | December 21, 2018 | Digital download; streaming | Eternal |
