= Mr & Mrs Gao =

Chinese YouTuber

- Occupation: YouTuber

YouTube information
- Subscribers: 6.66 million
- Views: 2.3 billion
- Last updated: 27 September 2025

Godspeed, also known as Mr Gao and Lao Gao (lit. Old Gao), is a Chinese YouTuber based in Japan and Singapore. Gao, which is not his family name, derives from the homophony of his former online name Godspeed. Together with his wife, Xiao Mo (lit. Little Mo) aka Mrs Gao, he runs the YouTube channel Mr & Mrs Gao. The two married in 2009.

Gao was born in 1981 in Dalian, Liaoning Province, China. He graduated from Dalian University of Technology and worked as an IT consultant in the financial sector. In 2004, he moved to Japan, where he met Xiao Mo, a Chinese student from Inner Mongolia. The two married in 2009.

When he began uploading videos in 2015, he used the name Godspeed, which led fans to start calling him Lao Gao in short. Together with a college classmate Rock (known as Lao Rou), he co-founded the YouTube channel KUAIZERO, which initially focused on mobile games such as Clash Royale. In 2018, Gao and his wife launched a talk show channel KUAIZERO. Following a split with Lao Rou over revenue-sharing, the channel was renamed Mr & Mrs Gao. Their videos typically cover topics such as urban legends, curiosities, mysticism, conspiracy theories, and cold cases.

== Controversies ==
In 2023, they were accused by another YouTuber, LQ Mama, of copying content from Japanese channels.

In 2024, a video about Dragon Ball was criticized for numerous inaccuracies, drawing backlash from viewers. Gao later issued an apology, and the video was removed.

== Popular culture ==
Taiwanese singer Jolin Tsai’s music video “Sweet Guilty Pleasure” features Mr and Mrs Gao.
