= ØZI =

Taiwanese R&B singer

ØZI 陳奕凡
- Born: Stefan Chen Yi-fan; March 27, 1997 (age 29); Los Angeles, California, U.S.
- Genres: R&B, hip hop
- Occupations: Singer; songwriter; rapper
- Instrument: Voice
- Years active: 2017–present
- Labels: New Paradise Music; RYCE Entertainment (China)
- Website: ØZI on Facebook

Stefan Chen Yi-fan (Chinese: 陳奕凡; born March 27, 1997), known professionally as ØZI, is a Taiwanese American singer-songwriter and rapper. ØZI is noted for integrating the genres of contemporary urban hip-hop, R&B, and Mandopop.

== Early life and education ==
ØZI was born Stefan Chen Yi-fan on March 27, 1997, in Los Angeles, California to Chen Wen-bin, a photographer, and Irene Yeh, a singer, and raised in Taipei, Taiwan and the United States. He began taking piano lessons at the age of 4, and learned to play the guitar at the age of 10. ØZI began rapping in high school. He attended the Berklee College of Music for a semester before leaving Boston altogether to pursue a career in music.

== Musical career ==
ØZI debuted in 2018 with ØZI: The Album, blending the genres of urban hip-hop and R&B. He was nominated for 6 awards at the 30th Golden Melody Awards, and won Best New Artist for his 2018 debut album. He released his second album, PEDESTAL in 2021.

== Discography ==
=== EPs ===
- "And Then I Turned ØZI" (2018)

=== Singles ===
- "Diamond" (2018)
- "If Only" (2019)
- "Who's Next" (2019)
- "MISSIONARY 傳教士" (2019)
- "LAVA!" (2020)
- "FREE FALL" (2020)
- "SLIDE" (2021)
- "0.03" (2021)
- "hair tie" (2021)
- "SEX TAPE ft. 落日飛車" (2024)

=== Albums ===
- ØZI: The Album (2018)
- PEDESTAL 基石 (2021)
- ADICA (2023)
- SWIRL (2025)

=== Features ===
- PARANOIA ft. BAEKHYUN, tobi lou, ØZI, and Cal Scruby - HEARTSTEEL (2023)
- 妳在哪裡 (WYA) Remix by Jay Park and NINGNING ft pH-1, Lexie Liu, ØZI, Masiwei (2023)
