= Super Star (Taiwanese TV series) =

Annual Chinese New Year's Eve television special produced by Taiwanese broadcaster TTV

- Country of origin: Taiwan
- Original language: Mandarin Chinese
- No. of episodes: 17 contests

Production
- Production locations: National Taiwan University Sports Center (2010); Taipei Arena (2011 onwards)
- Running time: 4 hours 30 minutes (with Ads)
- Production company: TTV

Original release
- Network: TTV Main Channel (Taiwan; Terrestrial & Cable); Hub E City (Singapore); Astro AEC (Malaysia)
- Release: February 13, 2010 – present

Related
- Kōhaku Uta Gassen

Super Star
- Traditional Chinese: 超級巨星紅白藝能大賞
Transcriptions
Standard Mandarin
- Hanyu Pinyin: Chāojí jùxīng hóngbái yì néng dàshǎng
- Bopomofo: ㄔㄠ ㄐㄧˊㄐㄩˋㄒㄧㄥ ㄏㄨㄥˊㄅㄞˊㄧˋㄋㄥˊㄋㄥˊㄉㄚˋㄕㄤˇ

Super Star, also known as TTV Super Star since 2020 (Chinese: 超級巨星紅白藝能大賞 lit. 'Superstars Red and White Talent Awards') is an annual Chinese New Year's Eve television special produced by Taiwanese broadcaster TTV. It is broadcast simultaneously on television and on the OTT platform, nationally and internationally by the TTV network and by some overseas broadcasters (mainly Singapore and Malaysia). Taiwan Mobile was later sponsored the event and carried digital rights for simulcast premiere in Taiwan between 2018 and 2025. The first special premiered on February 13, 2010, the eve of the 2010 Chinese New Year, and has span a total of 14 competitions since.

The competition is basically similar to the NHK's New Year's Eve special, Kōhaku Uta Gassen, which first premiered in 1951, albeit several differences from the original counterpart.

== History and format ==
Similar to Kōhaku Uta Gassen, these songs and performers are examined by a selection committee put together by TTV. The basis for selection are record sales and adaptability to the edition's theme.

At the same time, a demographic survey is conducted regarding the most popular singers for each and what kind of music people want to hear. This and the song selection explain the amalgamation of the musical genres and its artists.

The show was first announced on October 27, 2009 with Chang Hsiao-yen and Harlem Yu announced as hosts for the special. The special was taped on February 3, 2010 and first broadcast on February 13, 2010, and was held on National Taiwan University Sports Center. Beginning 2011, the special was held at the permanent venue of Taipei Arena.

In 2015, the broadcast was transitioned to High-definition television.

In 2018, the number of hosts were added and mediators are now included to serve as the hosts for the special. Chang and Harlem left the show and were respectively replaced by Nadow Lin & Mary Wu and Sam Wang & Jade Chang, except in 2023 edition which hosted by Chen Ming-chu and YELLOW, while Mickey Huang served as the show's overall mediator. In 2024 however, Lulu Huang Lu Zi Yin has taking over as the show mediator, replacing Mickey Huang.

The show also introduced a newly revamped logo per the renewal process, such as the inclusion of inverted exclamation mark in the middle of the red and white words for 2018–2020 edition and the mirror image between the letter R and W for 2022 edition, in which the later celebrate its networks 60th anniversary.

Beginning in 2020, Super Star introduced a mascot, "Super King" (an Orangutan dressed in red and white colored shirt with the TTV logo) to promote the competition.

Similar to Kōhaku, the competition is divided into teams of two, either the red team (Chinese: 紅隊; pinyin: Hóngduì) or white team (Chinese: 白隊; pinyin: Báiduì); however, these teams are not gender-affiliated unlike the original. At the end of all performances, the results are determined by the votes cast from the live audience. For 2019 and 2020, voting was expanded to include the social media viewers, resulting in a turnout of over a million votes. However, in 2021, voting was determined by the social media viewers alone as the contest was held closed doors as a result of the COVID-19 pandemic, this also delayed the announcement of the final results, which was posted on its Facebook page instead of airing it. These changes are reverted in the 2022 edition using the pre-2019 voting format; although the votes from the social media viewers didn't revealed during and beyond 2023 edition as the broadcast was also premiered on their YouTube channel outside Taiwan (excluding both Singapore and Malaysia).

Unlike Kōhaku, all of the contests are pre-recorded days or even weeks (in which Taiwanese Chinese New Year public holidays was held the day before CNY eve) before actual broadcast, instead of broadcasting live, due to post-production, including the addition of Traditional Chinese captions.

== Results ==
No.	Filming Date	Air Date	Red team host	White team host	Mediator	Winning team	Overall record
1	February 3, 2010	February 13, 2010	Chang Hsiao-yen	Harlem Yu	—N/a	White	0-1
2	January 10, 2011	February 2, 2011	Chang Hsiao-yen	Harlem Yu	—N/a	White	0-2
3	January 7, 2012	January 22, 2012	Chang Hsiao-yen	Harlem Yu	—N/a	Red	1-2
4	January 26, 2013	February 9, 2013	Chang Hsiao-yen	Harlem Yu	—N/a	Red	2-2
5	January 5, 2014	January 30, 2014	Chang Hsiao-yen	Harlem Yu	—N/a	Red	3-2
6	January 24, 2015	February 18, 2015	Chang Hsiao-yen	Harlem Yu	—N/a	Red	4-2
7	January 9, 2016	February 7, 2016	Chang Hsiao-yen	Harlem Yu	—N/a	White	4-3
8	January 7, 2017	January 27, 2017	Chang Hsiao-yen	Harlem Yu	—N/a	Red	5-3
9	January 13, 2018	February 15, 2018	Nadow Lin & Mary Wu	Sam Wang & Jade Chang	Mickey Huang	Red	6-3
10	January 5, 2019	February 4, 2019	Sam Wang & Mary Wu	Leo Chang & Jade Chang	Mickey Huang	Red	7-3
11	January 12, 2020	January 24, 2020	Nadow Lin & Mary Wu	Sam Wang & Jade Chang	Mickey Huang	White	7-4
12	January 23, 2021	February 11, 2021	Nadow Lin & Mary Wu	Sam Wang & Jade Chang	Mickey Huang	Red	8-4
13	January 8, 2022	January 31, 2022	Nadow Lin & Mary Wu	Sam Wang & Jade Chang	Mickey Huang	White	8-5
14	January 14, 2023	January 21, 2023	Chen Ming-chu	YELLOW (also performed)	Mickey Huang	White	8-6
15	January 27, 2024	February 9, 2024	Henry Hsu (also performed) & Sha Sha (Chung Hsin-yu)	Wayne Huang (also performed as W0LF(S)) & Chen Ming-chu	Lulu Huang Lu Zi Yin	White	8-7
16	January 5, 2025	January 28, 2025	Chen Ming-chu	Wayne Huang (also performed as W0LF(S))	Lulu Huang Lu Zi Yin	Red	9-7
17	January 31, 2026	February 16, 2026	Chen Ming-chu	Wayne Huang (also performed with Qiu Fengze)	Lulu Huang Lu Zi Yin	White	9-8
The red team has won 9 of the 17 contests.

== See also ==
- Kōhaku Uta Gassen - the original programme based on Super Star.
- CMG New Year's Gala, formerly known as The CCTV New Year's Gala, similar program in mainland China.
