= Pleasure World Tour =

2025–27 concert tour by Jolin Tsai

- World tour by Jolin Tsai
- Associated album: Pleasure
- Start date: December 30, 2025

Jolin Tsai concert chronology
- Ugly Beauty World Tour (2019–2024); Pleasure World Tour (2025–2027)

The Pleasure World Tour (Chinese: Pleasure世界巡迴演唱會) is the sixth concert tour by Taiwanese singer Jolin Tsai, themed around her fifteenth studio album Pleasure (2025). The tour began on December 30, 2025, at the Taipei Dome in Taipei, Taiwan.

== Background ==
On April 28, 2025, Mirror Media reported that Tsai was planning a new concert tour, scheduled to take place at the Taipei Dome in December of the same year, spanning eight shows from Christmas to New Year's Eve. This will mark her first-ever concerts at the Taipei Dome, making her the first female artist to hold eight consecutive shows at the venue. Each show is expected to accommodate about 40,000 attendees, totaling approximately 320,000 audience members.

On July 25, 2025, Tsai released her fifteenth studio album Pleasure. The album centers on the concept of the seven deadly sins, exploring multiple dimensions of desire, portraying it as both an inherent human instinct and a driving force toward transcendence through pleasure.

On October 31, 2025, Tsai officially announced her Pleasure World Tour, set to kick off on December 30, 2025, at the Taipei Dome. Ticket sales will begin across major ticketing platforms starting November 22, 2025.

== Development ==
=== Conception and rehearsals ===
The tour is directed and produced by The Squared Division, an Australian creative duo composed of Ashley Evans and Antony Ginandjar. The team previously collaborated with Tsai on her Ugly Beauty World Tour and her album Pleasure. Tsai seeks to extend the album's thematic concept, "pleasure is not a sin, and desire deserves to be embraced", through the tour, inviting the audience to rediscover genuine happiness with her in the "Garden of Earthly Delights". Marking her first-ever performance at the Taipei Dome, the tour showcases an elevated production scale and an innovative stage design that surpass all of her previous concerts.

Tsai also plans to travel to Los Angeles in November 2025 for a month-long intensive training program covering fitness, dance, and vocal performance to prepare for the scale and demands of such a large venue. Lee Po-hsi, general manager of Farglory Dome, stated that Tsai‘s team spent nearly a month at the Taipei Dome preparing the stage, equipment, and rehearsals to ensure that the stage design, equipment, and performance effects could be fully realized at the venue.

=== Poster ===
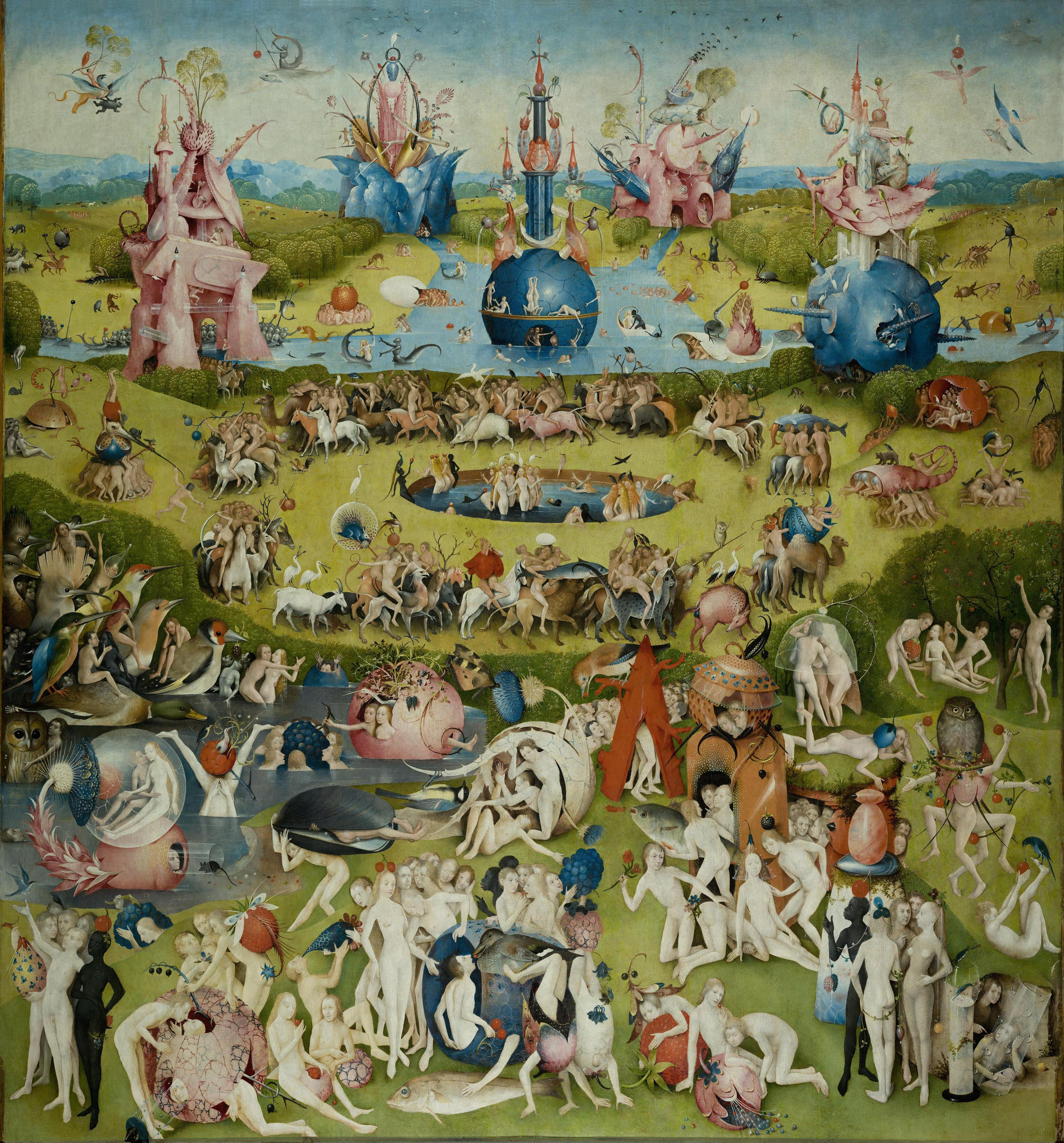
The poster draws inspiration from Hieronymus Bosch's painting The Garden of Earthly Delights.

The main visual was designed by Korean photographer Cho Gi-seok, who also worked on the "Seven Sins Garden" edition of Tsai's album Pleasure. In the poster, Tsai transforms into six personas, each representing an aspect of desire and emotion: the "Omnipotent Priestess" symbolizing dominance and control, the "Siren" with an enchanting voice, the "Eden Angel" representing beauty, the "Awakened Child" symbolizing lust and the forbidden pomegranate, the "Alien Enchantress" with octopus-like eyes representing greed, anger, and delusion, and the "Forest Deity" with ram horns embodying nature and joy. The visual design integrates floral and natural imagery, reflecting the theme of symbiosis between humanity and nature.

Tsai explained that the inspiration came partly from Hieronymus Bosch's painting The Garden of Earthly Delights, influenced her exploration of pleasure and desire as intertwined forces of human nature.

=== Stage setup ===
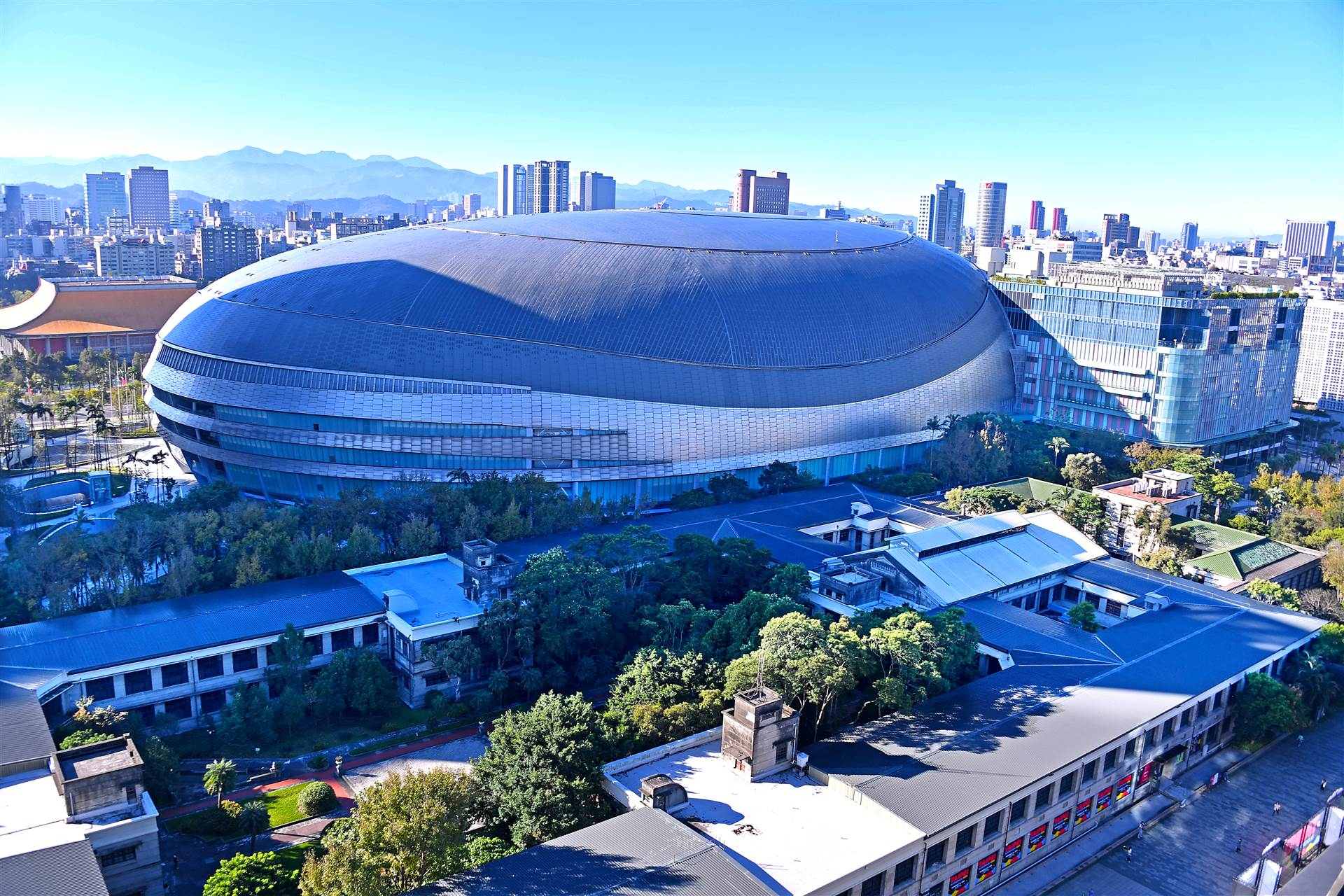
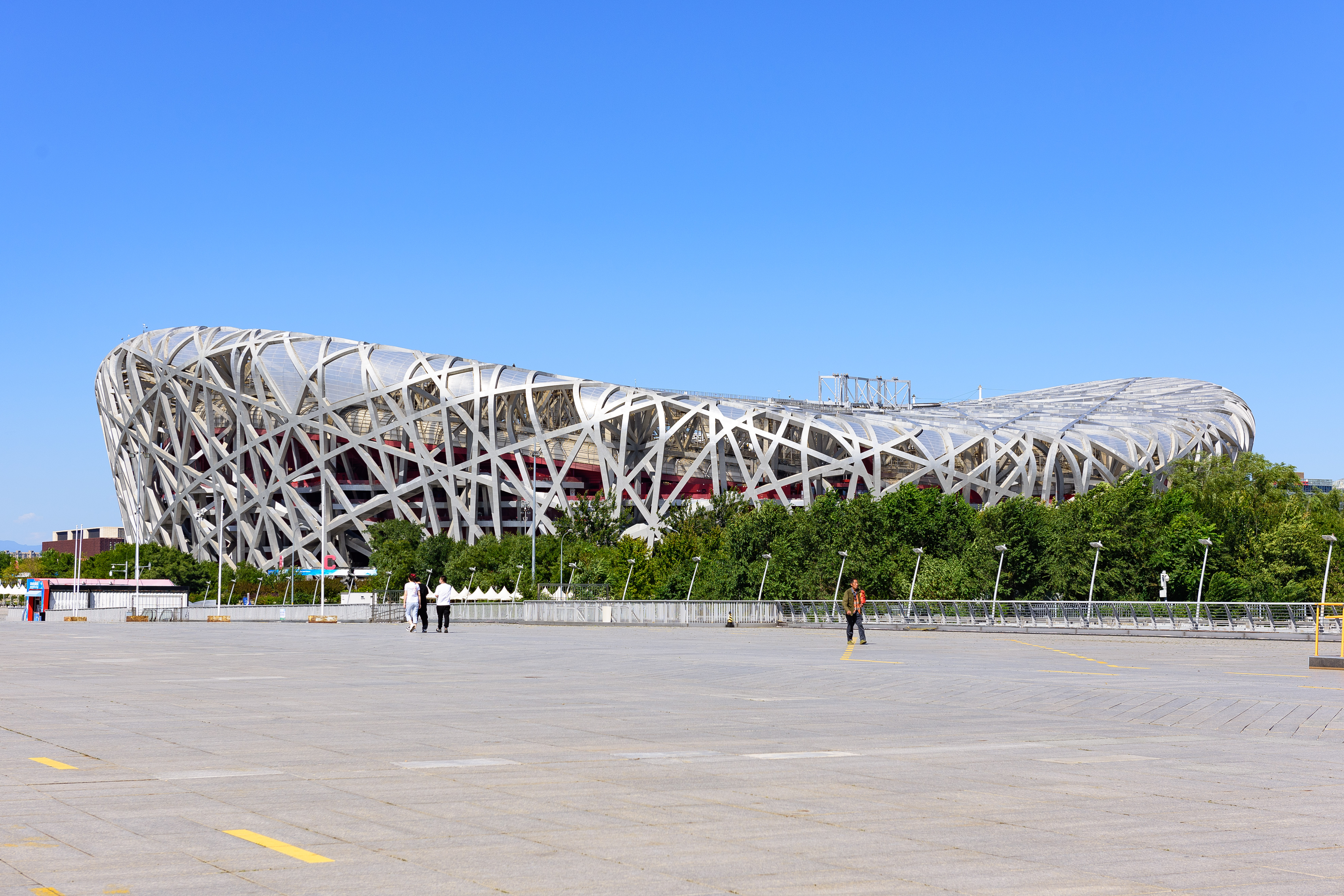
Tsai is the second Taiwanese female singer to perform at both the Taipei Dome (top) and the Beijing National Stadium (bottom).

Compared to her Ugly Beauty World Tour, the Pleasure World Tour enhances the immersive stage experience, tailored to the Taipei Dome's capacity of about 40,000 spectators. In this tour, Tsai embodies the persona of the "Mother of Pleasure", performing on a stage inspired by the concept of a "Garden of Earthly Delights". The setup includes a main stage, an extended stage, and a "stellar stage", all interconnected to form a multi-layered performance layout. This allows Tsai to move dynamically among different sections, enhancing interaction and visibility for the audience and providing a panoramic viewing experience. Tsai remarked that with the upgraded stage and production scale, the challenges are greater, and she aims to deliver a fresh audiovisual experience distinct from her past tours.

The entire performance was inspired by the famous painting The Garden of Earthly Delights by Dutch painter Hieronymus Bosch, using the triptych narrative structure of the painting as a blueprint. It was divided into three main sections: "Eden", "Earthly Delights", and "Last Judgment". The show opened with the grand appearance of a giant "Celebration Bull", followed by various hybrid animals, including the "Desire Giant Serpent", "Winged Pegasus", "Greedy Golden Pig", "Butterfly Seahorse", "Long-Necked Reindeer", and "Elephant-Nosed Fish", totaling twenty creatures. These highly realistic animal figures led the audience into the "Pleasure Universe" of the stage world.

The stage design and props were meticulously crafted for each section, with items such as the "Purgatory Sword Forest", "Book of Truth", "Green Hill Giant", "Crowned Serpent Heart Seat", "Wheel of Fate", and the seven-story-high "Lady of Pleasure". These details were as refined as works of art, complementing the overall stage concept and narrative. Tsai also served as the creative director for the concert, playing the role of the "Beast Queen", leading the giant animals throughout the performance and turning "The Garden of Earthly Delights" into a large-scale "Beast Party".

In terms of production costs, the total for the stage, lighting, sound, venue rental, and related equipment amounted to approximately NT$280 million. The production and shipping of thirty stage props cost around NT$170 million, while the international-level visual effects cost about NT$100 million. Additionally, the five interlude videos filmed in Los Angeles cost approximately NT$50 million. The total production cost of the tour was approximately NT$900 million, setting a new record for the highest production cost of a concert in the history of the Chinese-language music industry.

=== Costumes ===
For this concert, a total of seven main stage outfits were prepared, paired with 36 dancers and stunt performers. The total number of costumes reached 180, with the overall costume budget amounting to approximately NT$50 million. To accommodate the active movement required for the dance performances, each outfit was paired with around 40 pairs of shoes, totaling over 200 pairs for quick changes. This concert also marked the first time Tsai performed on stage wearing sneakers. The overall costume design was coordinated by stylist Heather Picciottino, who invited six stylists to participate in the design process. The costume concepts were an extension of the album's theme, "Seven Deadly Sins", and were each tailored to correspond to six fantastic scenes: "The Peak of Awakening", "Desire's Exotic Realm", "Sensory Paradise", "The Book of Truth", "Vivid Dreamscape", and "Pleasure Garden". These designs combined artistry, avant-garde fantasy, and fashion elements to present Tsai's multiple roles as the "Mother of Pleasure".

The opening look was created by up-and-coming British designer Maximilian Raynor, blending historical cultural influences with avant-garde elements to present the character of the "Guardian of Desire". In the same chapter, Tsai also wore an outfit designed by Dilara Findikoglu, featuring a gothic style with avant-garde tailored vests, nude-like and black swirling lines, representing the "Earth Spirit" character. The second chapter's look was designed by the New York brand ManMadeSkins, which uses vegan leather as its primary material, incorporating punk elements and avant-garde aesthetics to create the "Witch Lilith" and "Seductive Queen" costumes. The main look in the third chapter was designed by Vietnamese brand Lsoul, using layered and draped details in the corset to create a dreamlike atmosphere, presenting the character of "Golden Silk Diva". Another outfit in the same chapter, provided by Valentino, featured a high-neck sheer chiffon shirt as the base, layered with a black vest and cape, adding dramatic effect for the stage. The fourth chapter's costume was designed by Chinese up-and-coming brand Windowsen, focusing on crossing the boundaries of reality and the unknown, and challenging traditional gender and aesthetic norms. Tsai wore this to portray the "Illusion Venus" character. The final chapter's costume was the "Pleasure Queen" battle armor, which served as the closing look for the entire performance.

== Concert synopsis ==
This concert, themed "A Magical Journey Exploring Human Desire and Self-Awakening", created a fantastical "Pleasure Universe" worldview. In Chapter One: "The Girl in the Garden [Exodus]", the journey began with the "Festival Messengers" sounding horns, as a giant "Festival Bull" slowly circled the stage. Tsai, adorned in a double-faced helmet symbolizing "pleasure and pain", transformed into the "Guardian of Desire". She ascended the "Awakening Summit", surrounded by the "Soul Pillars", and, upon removing her helmet, officially launched the concert with her performance of "Seven". Following this, she shed her luxurious outer garment, symbolizing a transformation into the "Earth Spirit", and performed "Lady in Red". She then summoned her mount, the "Desire Serpent", to accompany her during the performance of "Medusa". Tsai continued the high-energy atmosphere with "DIY" and "I'm Not Yours", building towards the climax of the opening act.

In Chapter Two: "Pleasure Echoes Pain", the second chapter maintained the momentum with a series of electrifying performances. Tsai powerfully sang through "Necessary Evil", "Agent J", "The Great Artist", "Karma", "Hot Winter", "Bloody Mary", "Good Girl", "Sweet Guilty Pleasure", "Woman's Work", and "Honey Trap", keeping the audience on their feet, immersed in the intense energy of the show. Chapter Three: "Surrender the Fool" shifted the mood to a more introspective and lyrical atmosphere. Tsai, dressed in a golden vest and bridal veil, transformed into the "Golden Silk Diva". Facing the stage installation, "The Book of Truth",which symbolized "Unfinished Words", she delicately performed "Fish Love", "Womnxly", "Compromise", and a medley of "The Third Person and I", "Sky", "Pretence", and "The Smell of Lemon Grass". Each song poignantly explored themes of confusion, growth, and emotional release in love. She closed this reflective chapter with the haunting "Layers".

In Chapter Four: "Before the Truth", Tsai evolved into the "Illusion Venus", riding the "Winged Pegasus", a symbol of love and freedom. Dancers, dressed as fantastical creatures such as "Butterfly Seahorses", "Long-Necked Reindeers", and "Elephant-Nosed Fishes", accompanied her as she circled the venue. The performance continued with "Safari", followed by a medley of "Equal in the Darkness", "Sun Will Never Set", "A Wonder in Madrid", "Say Love You", "Hubby", "Butterfly", and "Magic". Through a blend of dance, visual effects, and dreamlike storytelling, the audience was transported into an immersive theme park of wonder and fantasy. Finally, in Chapter Five: "The Garden of Her Own", Tsai emerged as the "Queen of Pleasure". With her transformation complete, she took the stage to perform "Pleasure", "Bravo Lover", "Ugly Beauty", "Dancing Diva", "Stars Align", and "Play", bringing the magical journey to an unforgettable close.

== Commercial reception ==
The tickets for the first Taipei shows, scheduled from December 30, 2025, to January 1, 2026, were made available for priority purchase on November 22, 2025. The three priority qualification categories (Cathay United CUBE credit card holders, Taiwan Mobile users, and Tsai's official website members) attracted over 270,000 people vying for 30,000 limited tickets, which sold out quickly after being released. The following day, when general sales opened at noon, the ticketing website saw a peak of 940,000 simultaneous users attempting to purchase tickets. At 5 p.m. the same day, the ticketing system conducted a ticket clearing process and released some remaining tickets, which were also sold out rapidly. In the end, all 90,000 general admission tickets were sold, bringing the total of 120,000 tickets across the three shows to a complete sellout, setting a new record for ticket sales at Tsai's concerts.

The Beijing shows of the tour were held at the Beijing National Stadium from June 12 to 14, 2026, marking Tsai's debut performances at the venue and making her the fifth female singer to hold a solo concert there. Tickets for all three shows sold out shortly after going on sale, attracting approximately 170,000 attendees in total and generating an estimated box office revenue of NT$870 million.

== Critical reception ==
According to United Daily News' Hsu Chin-jung, for Tsai, this concert was not a coronation but rather an evolution and a rewriting of records. The expansion of the concert venue and the increase in audience numbers also brought higher risks. However, Tsai is accustomed to high-pressure environments and meticulous control of details. While the concert appeared to be a comprehensive upgrade on the surface, it in fact redefined performance rules and introduced innovative formats. Produced with a budget of NT$900 million, the concert featured 30 songs accompanied by lighting, video, and various high-end props, forming a "Pleasure Universe" that enhanced audience immersion. Unlike other artists, who often choose safer or classic songs in large venues, Tsai continued to take risks between popularity and experimentation, balancing commercial expectations with her personal standards. She has been described as a "tightrope-walking woman", pursuing increasingly difficult stage challenges rather than relying on past hits to maintain audience engagement.

Taiwanese musician Adam Hsu noted that the key to Tsai's concert lay not in its high production cost, but in her effective use of resources and overall execution. He praised Tsai for maintaining a high level of discipline over the long term, resulting in consistent standards in physical condition, stage movement, and performance control, and observed that she is now able to deliver performances involving risk and innovation based on trust in a professional creative team. Taiwanese choreographer Bruce Chang stated that Tsai's concert surpassed the framework of a traditional pop concert in both structure and production, demonstrating a highly integrated stage design and a narrative-driven performance format with a mature level of completion. He noted that Tsai displayed a stable and composed performance state, and that the concert had an influence on the production standards of large-scale C-pop concerts.

== Awards ==
On May 19, 2026, High Scream, the tour's lead production and lighting designer, received a Bronze Award in the General – Live Events & Experiences category at the 2026 Telly Awards for its non-broadcast video productions showcasing the tour.

== Set list ==
The following setlist was obtained from the concert held on December 30, 2025, in Taipei, Taiwan, and does not represent all concerts for the duration of the tour.

Chapter 1: The Girl in the Garden [Exodus]

1. "Seven"
2. "Lady in Red"
3. "Medusa"
4. "DIY"
5. "I'm Not Yours"

Chapter 2: Pleasure Echoes Pain

6. "Necessary Evil"
7. "Agent J"
8. "The Great Artist"
9. "Karma"
10. "Hot Winter"
11. "Bloody Mary"
12. "Good Girl"
13. "Sweet Guilty Pleasure"
14. "Woman's Work"
15. "Honey Trap"

Chapter 3: Surrender the Fool

16. "Fish Love"
17. "Womxnly"
18. "Compromise"
19. "The Third Person and I"
20. "Sky"
21. "Pretence"
22. "The Smell of Lemon Grass"
23. "Layers"

Chapter 4: Before the Truth

24. "Safari"
25. "Equal in the Darkness"
26. "Sun Will Never Set"
27. "A Wonder in Madrid"
28. "Say Love You"
29. "Hubby"
30. "Butterfly"
31. "Magic"
32. "Inside Out"
33. "Pillow"

Chapter 5: The Garden of Her Own

34. "Pleasure"
35. "Bravo Lover"
36. "Ugly Beauty"
37. "Dancing Diva"
38. "Stars Align"
39. "Play"
40. "Pleasure" (outro)
Notes
- During the concert in Taipei on December 31, 2025, Tsai performed "Rewind" and "Love in the Shape of a Heart", and did not perform "The Third Person and I", "Pretence", or "Pillow".
- During the concert in Taipei on January 1, 2026, Tsai performed "I Know You're Feeling Blue", and did not perform "Pretence" or "Pillow".
- During the concert in Shenzhen on March 7, 2026, Tsai performed "Can't Speak Clearly", and did not perform "Good Girl" or "Womxnly".
- During the concert in Shenzhen on March 8, 2026, Tsai performed "Can't Speak Clearly" and "Vulnerability", and did not perform "Good Girl", "Womxnly", "Pretence", or "Inside Out".
- During the concert in Xiamen on March 14, 2026, Tsai performed "Can't Speak Clearly" and "Alone", and did not perform "Good Girl", "Womxnly", or "The Third Person and I".
- During the concert in Xiamen on March 15, 2026, Tsai performed "Can't Speak Clearly" and "Gravity", and did not perform "Good Girl", "Womxnly", "Pretence", or "Inside Out".
- During the concert in Changsha on March 21, 2026, Tsai performed "I" and "Rewind", and did not perform "Good Girl", "Womxnly", "Pretence", or "Inside Out".
- During the concert in Changsha on March 22, 2026, Tsai performed "I", "Rewind", and "Mosaic", and did not perform "Good Girl", "Womxnly", "The Third Person and I", "Pretence", or "Inside Out".
- During the concert in Chongqing on March 28, 2026, Tsai performed "Heart Breaking Day" and "Rewind", and did not perform "Good Girl", "Womxnly", or "The Third Person and I".
- During the concert in Chongqing on March 29, 2026, Tsai performed "Heart Breaking Day" and "Rewind", and did not perform "Good Girl" or "Womxnly".
- During the concert in Qingdao on April 11, 2026, Tsai performed "Fake Confess", "Rewind", and "Priceless", and did not perform "Good Girl", "Womxnly", "The Third Person and I", "Pretence", or "Layers".
- During the concert in Xi'an on April 18, 2026, Tsai performed "Fear-Free" and "Vulnarability", and did not perform "Good Girl", "Womxnly", "The Third Person and I", "Pretence", or "Layers".
- During the concert in Suzhou on April 25, 2026, Tsai performed "Can't Speak Clearly", "Love in the Shape of a Heart", and "Rewind", and did not perform "Good Girl", "Womxnly", "Pretence", or "Layers".
- During the concert in Nanning on May 3, 2026, Tsai performed "Wandering Poet", "Rewind", and "Life Sucks", and did not perform "Good Girl", "Womxnly", "The Third Person and I", or "Layers".
- During the concert in Hangzhou on May 15, 2026, Tsai performed "On Happiness Road", "Rewind", "Vulnerability", and "Exclusive Myth", and did not perform "Womxnly", "The Third Person and I", "Pretence", or "Layers".
- During the concert in Hangzhou on May 16, 2026, Tsai performed "Can't Speak Clearly", "Love in the Shape of a Heart", and "Greek Girl by the Wishing Pond", and did not perform "Womxnly", "Pretence", or "Layers".
- During the concert in Hangzhou on May 17, 2026, Tsai performed "I", "Real Hurt", "Rewind", and "Black-Haired Beautiful Girl", and did not perform "Womxnly", "The Third Person and I", "Pretence", or "Layers".
- During the concert in Fuzhou on May 23, 2026, Tsai performed "Rewind", "Color Photos", "Love in the Shape of a Heart", and "Black-Haired Beautiful Girl", and did not perform "Womxnly", "The Third Person and I", "Pretence", or "Layers".
- During the concert in Hefei on May 30, 2026, Tsai performed "Heart Breaking Day", "The Prologue", "Vulnerability", and "Greek Girl by the Wishing Pond", and did not perform "Womxnly", "The Third Person and I", "Pretence", or "Layers".
- During the concert in Beijing on June 12, 2026, Tsai performed "Heart Breaking Day", "Rewind", "Mosaic", and "Dr. Jolin", and did not perform "Womxnly", "The Third Person and I", "Pretence", "Layers", or "Equal in the Darkness".
- During the concert in Beijing on June 13, 2026, Tsai performed "Dr. Jolin", performed "Practice Love", "The Third Person and I", and Rewind" with JJ Lin, and did not perform "Womxnly" or "Layers".
- During the concert in Beijing on June 14, 2026, Tsai performed "Can't Speak Clearly", "Sweet and Sour", "Dr. Jolin", and "Signature Gesture", and did not perform "Womxnly", "The Third Person and I", "Pretence", or "Layers".
- During the concert in Shenyang on June 20, 2026, Tsai performed "Wandering Poet", "Vulnerability", "Nothing Left to Say", and "Dr. Jolin", and did not perform "Womxnly", "The Third Person and I", "Pretence", or "Layers".
- During the concert in Taiyuan on July 4, 2026, Tsai performed "Do You Still Love Me", "Take Immediate Action", "Love in the Shape of a Heart", "Vulnerability", and "Dr. Jolin", and did not perform "Womxnly", "The Third Person and I", "Pretence", or "Layers".
- During the concert in Nanchang on July 13, 2026, Tsai performed "Rewind", "Habitual Betrayal", "The Spirit of Knight", "It's Love", and "Dr. Jolin", and did not perform "Womxnly", "Pretence", or "Layers".
- During the concert in Chengdu on July 19, 2026, Tsai performed "Rewind", "Parachute", "Gravity", "Vulnerability", "Black-Haired Beautiful Girl", "Dr. Jolin", and "Ego-Holic", and did not perform "Womxnly", "The Third Person and I", "Sky", "Pretence", or "Layers".
- During the concert in Chengdu on July 20, 2026, Tsai performed "Rewind", "Untitled", "Mosaic", "Dancing Forever", "Dr. Jolin", and "Signature Gesture", and did not perform "Womxnly", "The Third Person and I", "Pretence", or "Layers".
- During the concert in Guangzhou on August 7, 2026, Tsai performed "Rewind", "Blame It on the Age", "Mr. Q", "Dr. Jolin", and "Signature Gesture", and did not perform "Womxnly", "Pretence", or "Layers".
- During the concert in Guangzhou on August 8, 2026, Tsai performed "Heard That Love's Ever Been Back", "Rewind", "Prague Square (Jolin Version)", "36 Tricks of Love", "Phony Queen", "Dr. Jolin", "Signature Gesture", and "The Spirit of Knight", and did not perform "Womxnly", "The Third Person and I", "Pretence", or "Layers".

== Shows ==
List of concert dates
Date	City	Country	Venue	Attendance (Note: Rough numbers of attendance)	Revenue (Note: Rough numbers of revenue)
December 30, 2025	Taipei	Taiwan	Taipei Dome	≈120,000	≈NT$560,000,000
December 31, 2025	Taipei	Taiwan	Taipei Dome	≈120,000	≈NT$560,000,000
January 1, 2026	Taipei	Taiwan	Taipei Dome	≈120,000	≈NT$560,000,000
March 7, 2026	Shenzhen	China	Shenzhen Universiade Sports Centre Stadium	≈50,000	Unknown
March 8, 2026	Shenzhen	China	Shenzhen Universiade Sports Centre Stadium	≈50,000	Unknown
March 14, 2026	Xiamen	China	Xiamen Egret Stadium	≈46,000	Unknown
March 15, 2026	Xiamen	China	Xiamen Egret Stadium	≈46,000	Unknown
March 21, 2026	Changsha	China	Helong Sports Center Stadium	35,259	RMB 74,166,310 (Note: Based on the exchange rate on the day of the performance, this is equivalent to approximately NT$344.82 million.)
March 22, 2026	Changsha	China	Helong Sports Center Stadium	35,234	RMB 74,166,310
March 28, 2026	Chongqing	China	Chongqing Olympic Sports Center Stadium	Unknown	Unknown
March 29, 2026	Chongqing	China	Chongqing Olympic Sports Center Stadium	Unknown	Unknown
April 11, 2026	Qingdao	China	Qingdao Citizen Fitness Center Stadium	≈40,000	Unknown
April 18, 2026	Xi'an	China	Xi'an Olympic Sports Center Stadium	Unknown	Unknown
April 25, 2026	Suzhou	China	Suzhou Olympic Sports Centre Stadium	≈37,000	Unknown
May 3, 2026	Nanning	China	Guangxi Sports Center Stadium	≈42,900	Unknown
May 15, 2026	Hangzhou	China	Hangzhou Olympic Sports Center Stadium	≈140,000	Unknown
May 16, 2026	Hangzhou	China	Hangzhou Olympic Sports Center Stadium	≈140,000	Unknown
May 17, 2026	Hangzhou	China	Hangzhou Olympic Sports Center Stadium	≈140,000	Unknown
May 23, 2026	Fuzhou	China	Fuzhou Strait Olympic Sports Center Stadium	≈45,000	Unknown
May 30, 2026	Hefei	China	Hefei Olympic Sports Center Stadium	≈40,000	Unknown
June 12, 2026	Beijing	China	Beijing National Stadium	≈170,000	≈NT$870,000,000
June 13, 2026	Beijing	China	Beijing National Stadium	≈170,000	≈NT$870,000,000
June 14, 2026	Beijing	China	Beijing National Stadium	≈170,000	≈NT$870,000,000
June 20, 2026	Shenyang	China	Shenyang Olympic Sports Centre Stadium	Unknown	Unknown
July 4, 2026	Taiyuan	China	Shanxi Sports Centre Stadium	Unknown	Unknown
July 13, 2026 (Note: Originally scheduled for July 11, it was postponed to July 13 following an announcement on the morning of the scheduled performance, in accordance with the local government's July 10 evening meeting decisions regarding Typhoon Bavi.)	Nanchang	China	Nanchang International Sports Center Stadium	≈22,000	Unknown
July 19, 2026	Chengdu	China	Dong'an Lake Sports Park Stadium	Unknown	Unknown
July 20, 2026	Chengdu	China	Dong'an Lake Sports Park Stadium	Unknown	Unknown
August 7, 2026	Guangzhou	China	Guangdong Olympic Sports Centre Stadium	90,000	Unknown
August 8, 2026	Guangzhou	China	Guangdong Olympic Sports Centre Stadium	90,000	Unknown
January 22, 2027	Taipei	Taiwan	Taipei Dome	—	—
January 23, 2027	Taipei	Taiwan	Taipei Dome	—	—
January 24, 2027	Taipei	Taiwan	Taipei Dome	—	—
January 29, 2027	Taipei	Taiwan	Taipei Dome	—	—
January 30, 2027	Taipei	Taiwan	Taipei Dome	—	—
January 31, 2027	Taipei	Taiwan	Taipei Dome	—	—
Total				Unknown	Unknown
