= Agent J (disambiguation) =

Agent J is a character in the Men in Black film series.

Agent J may also refer to:

- Agent J (album), a 2007 album by Jolin Tsai
  - "Agent J" (song), its title song
- Agent J (film), a 2007 Taiwanese action romance film
- Agent J, a video game character in Elite Beat Agents
