= Pleasure (Jolin Tsai album) =

- Standard edition cover

Studio album by Jolin Tsai
- Released: July 25, 2025
- Studios: BB Road (Taipei); Mega Force (New Taipei); Platinum (Taipei); Lights Up (Taipei); Paramount (Los Angeles)
- Genre: Pop
- Length: 34:03
- Labels: Warner; Eternal
- Producers: Jolin Tsai; Starr Chen; Richard Craker; Nick Lee; Ross Golan; Ojivolta; Jenna Andrews; Stephen Eric Kirk

Jolin Tsai chronology
Ugly Beauty (2018)	Pleasure (2025)

Singles from Pleasure
- 1. "Pleasure" Released: May 28, 2025; 2. "DIY" Released: June 27, 2025

Pleasure is the fifteenth studio album by Taiwanese singer Jolin Tsai, released on July 25, 2025, by Warner. Centered around the theme of the seven deadly sins, the album explores the multifaceted nature of desire, portraying it as an innate human instinct. It presents pleasure as the culmination that arises from the sublimation of desire.

The album was released in physical format exclusively in Taiwan and ranked as the highest-selling album by a female artist in 2025. In China, it was released only in digital format. As of the end of 2025, cumulative digital sales exceeded 220,000 units, making it the highest-selling digital album by a C-pop female artist that year; As of June 16, 2026, cumulative digital sales have exceeded 333,000 units, with total revenue surpassing RMB 10 million.

The album received the most nominations at the 37th Golden Melody Awards, totaling nine nominations, including Album of the Year, Best Mandarin Album, Best Vocal Recording Album, Song of the Year for "Pleasure", Best Music Arrangement for "DIY", and Best Music Video nominations for both "Pleasure" and "Fish Love". Tsai was also nominated for Best Mandarin Female Singer and Best Album Producer, together with Starr Chen. Ultimately, the album won Album of the Year and Best Vocal Recording Album, while Tsai won Best Mandarin Female Singer.

== Background ==
On October 15, 2024, Tsai attended a Balvenie event in Taipei, where she revealed that six tracks for her new album had been recorded and announced plans for its release in the first half of the following year. On December 11, 2024, Tsai attended a Valentino event in Taipei, where she shared her intention to release the new album in the spring of the following year. The album is expected to include 11 tracks. On December 14, 2024, media outlets reported that Tsai is scheduled to release the album in March 2025. In response, Tsai's manager clarified that "the concept for the new album was developed in parallel with that of the upcoming concert tour. The schedule is still being planned, and any confirmed information will be announced in due course."

On April 2, 2025, Tsai attended a MAC event in Shanghai, where she revealed that she had recently traveled to Los Angeles for the photoshoot of her new album cover and music video. She also announced that her new album would be released in May of the same year. When discussing the album's style, Tsai mentioned that both the concept and production choices were bold and something she had never attempted before. "These are things I have always wanted to explore," she stated. "The makeup for this album is also quite different, aligning closely with the character and themes in the lyrics."

== Development ==
Since the release of her previous album Ugly Beauty, Tsai developed a profound interest in exploring the possibilities of her own vocal expression, prompting her to deeply contemplate the question, "Where can my voice go?" During the COVID-19 pandemic, she enrolled in online courses at the Berklee College of Music to study recording techniques from the ground up. Equipped with these new skills, she began to write songs independently, channeling her passion for songwriting into a driving force for continual progress.

Throughout the creative process, Tsai collaborated with musicians through songwriting camps in Taipei and Los Angeles, as well as remote online exchanges. Although she is not proficient at playing traditional musical instruments, she gradually recognized her voice itself as a vital creative tool. Beginning with backing vocal arrangements during the demo stage, spontaneous inspiration during recording sessions became central to her songwriting. Tsai took an active role in the creation of each track on the album, overseeing the majority of backing vocal arrangements and recordings. She was fully engaged in the production details, including fine-tuning vocal nuances and structuring layered soundscapes. As the album's musical director, Tsai devoted considerable time and effort, undergoing multiple revisions and adjustments, culminating in her longest production cycle to date.

== Writing and recording ==
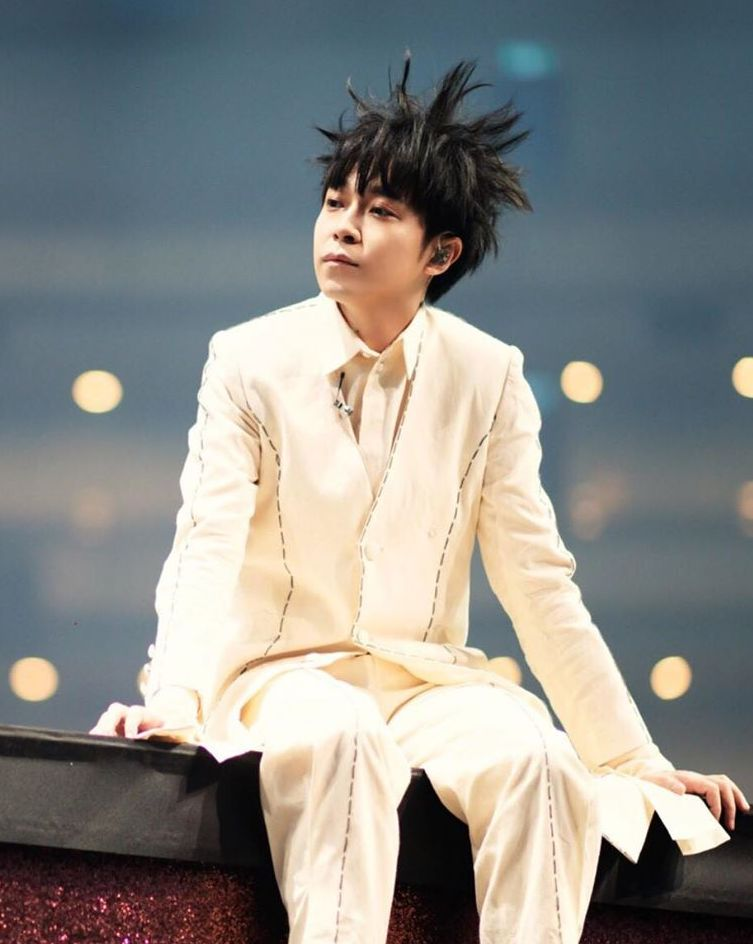
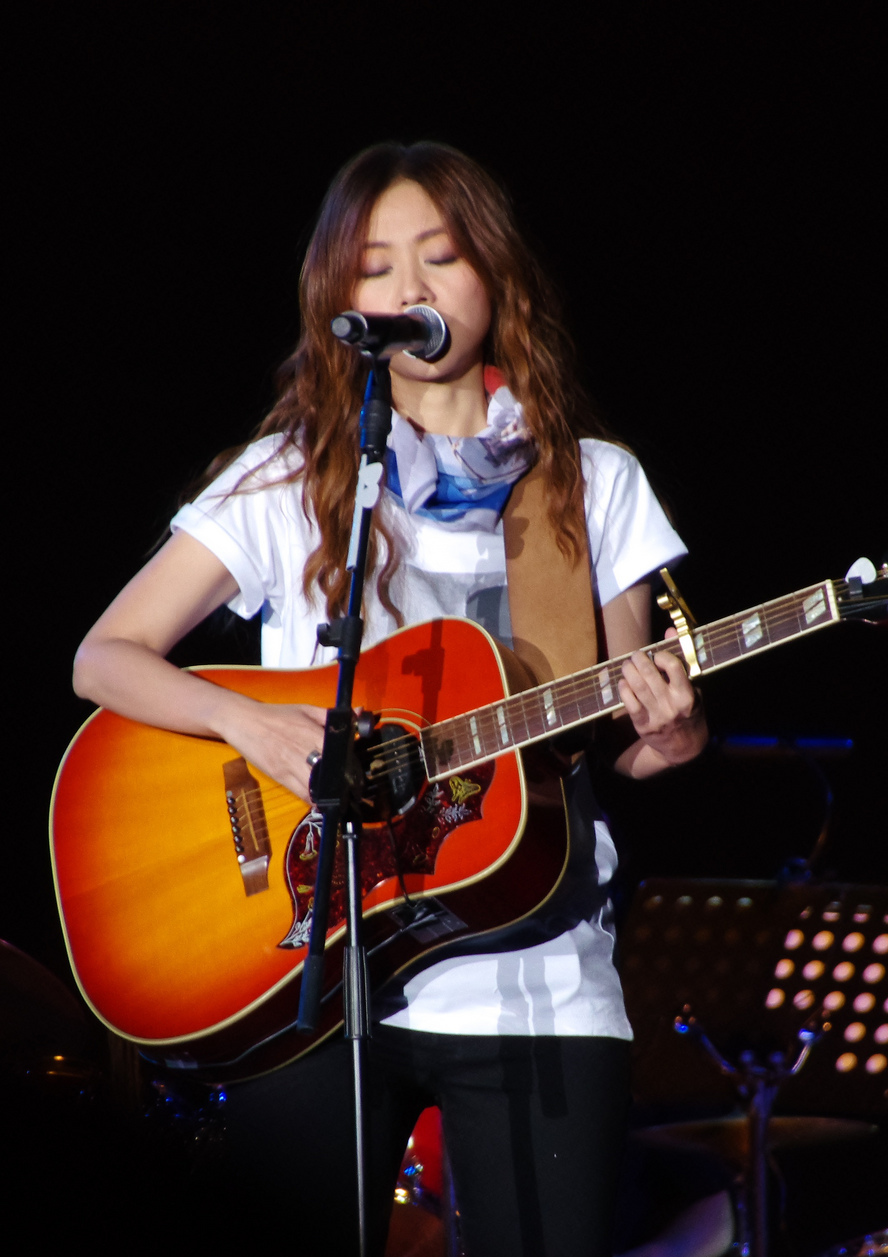
Greeny Wu (left) and Cheer Chen (right), two collaborators on the album

The opening track, "Layers", uses the motif of "falling" as an entry point into the subconscious. Through trip-hop and cool-toned electropop arrangements, it creates an ethereal and immersive auditory experience. Co-written by Tsai, Nick Lee, and Ross Golan, the song employs hypnotic lyrics and synthesizer textures to depict the emergence of suppressed desires and the essence of human nature beneath the surface of consciousness, symbolizing the beginning of an inward journey.

"The Divine Comedy: Purgatorio" continues the thematic narrative from the previous track, reinterpreting the medieval Latin chant "O Fortuna" to evoke the atmosphere of purgatorial judgment as portrayed in Dante Alighieri's "Divine Comedy". The symbolic Wheel of Fortune further reinforces the religious allegory and psychological tension woven throughout the piece. Focusing on the seven deadly sins, "Seven" features a melody co-composed by Tsai and Richard Craker, with lyrics penned by Greeny Wu. The song explores forbidden desires and their complex symbolism. Anchored in a dark pop foundation with a dark electro undercurrent, the arrangement combines gothic epic atmospheres with metallic textures, integrating excerpts from "O Fortuna" in both the interlude and outro, creating a seamless conceptual and sonic link to the preceding track.

The album's title track, "Pleasure", delves into the nature of pleasure itself. Drawing inspiration from rave culture, it blends techno and house elements, with a rhythm that oscillates between calm and intensity. Co-written by Tsai alongside multiple collaborators, the song expresses the evolved spiritual state shaped by desire, concluding with the emphatic declaration "That's my pleasure!" as a thematic centerpiece. "Safari" approaches the primal and instinctual, portraying a subconscious hunt as a metaphor for desire. Produced by Ojivolta, the track fuses disco, electropop, and dancehall rhythms to create layered grooves. Tsai utilizes vivid imagery and color to depict raw expressions of desire, emphasizing a body's intuitive response.

Addressing emotional fluctuations and psychological struggles, "Inside Out" incorporates pop funk and city pop influences. Its light rhythm and playful lyricism reflect everyday emotional transformations. The track, co-written by Tsai, The Crane, Razor Chiang, Anders Gukko, and Sandra Wikström, conveys a mode of self-regulation and release through music. "Woman's Work" frames pleasure and desire as acts of dominance and control. With R&B groove and contemporary pop production, it situates female empowerment at the forefront. Written with Jenna Andrews and the Kirk brothers, Tsai's vocal delivery balances restraint and seduction, illustrating a perspective where the rules of pleasure are self-determined. "Pillow" explores dependency and tenderness within intimate relationships. Combining R&B, neo soul, and bedroom pop, and co-written with Josh Cumbee, the arrangement layers deep bass grooves and hazy synthesizers to evoke a nocturnal ambiance, portraying the emotional exchange and flow of desire between lovers.

"DIY" articulates bodily autonomy and sensory sovereignty, emphasizing that pleasure need not rely on external validation. With melody co-written by Tsai, Richard Craker, and Jackson Dimiglio-Wood, and lyrics among the earliest completed for the album, the track merges electropop and trap elements. Its sonic progression builds from inner to outer layers, culminating in tribal rhythms that highlight the release of primal energy. Adopting the lullaby form, "Hush Little Baby" redefines the boundary between tenderness and control. Familiar melodies are transformed under electronic arrangements to evoke a sense of oppression, illustrating emotional bondage and spiritual control enacted under the guise of love. This inversion of the original soothing intent lends the song a potent sense of authority. Co-written with Cheer Chen, "Good Girl" employs a satirical tone to examine autonomy and manipulation in the pursuit of pleasure. The song fuses trap and electropop with an upbeat tempo and bold lyricism. Tsai's playful vocal style interprets the dynamic interplay between desire and power, positioning "I'm so good" as an anthem of empowered self-expression.

Inspired by Abraham J. Twerski's theory, "Fish Love" contemplates the boundaries between love and possession. Presented in an alternative pop style and co-written with Riley Biederer and Mattheos Herbert Weedon, the song's near-confessional delivery expresses the shame and yearning born from emotional imbalance. Closing the album, "Bloody Mary" expresses a detached attitude toward worldly measures of happiness, rejecting fame and fortune as standards for joy. Written in collaboration with Choice37 and the YG Entertainment team, it combines funk pop with hip-hop rhythms. The bright arrangement supports Tsai's crisp vocals, which convey a resolute stance on self-determination. The track encapsulates the album's overarching theme: when desires are honestly embraced, true pleasure can emerge, and "only by living authentically can one exit the race."

== Title and theme ==
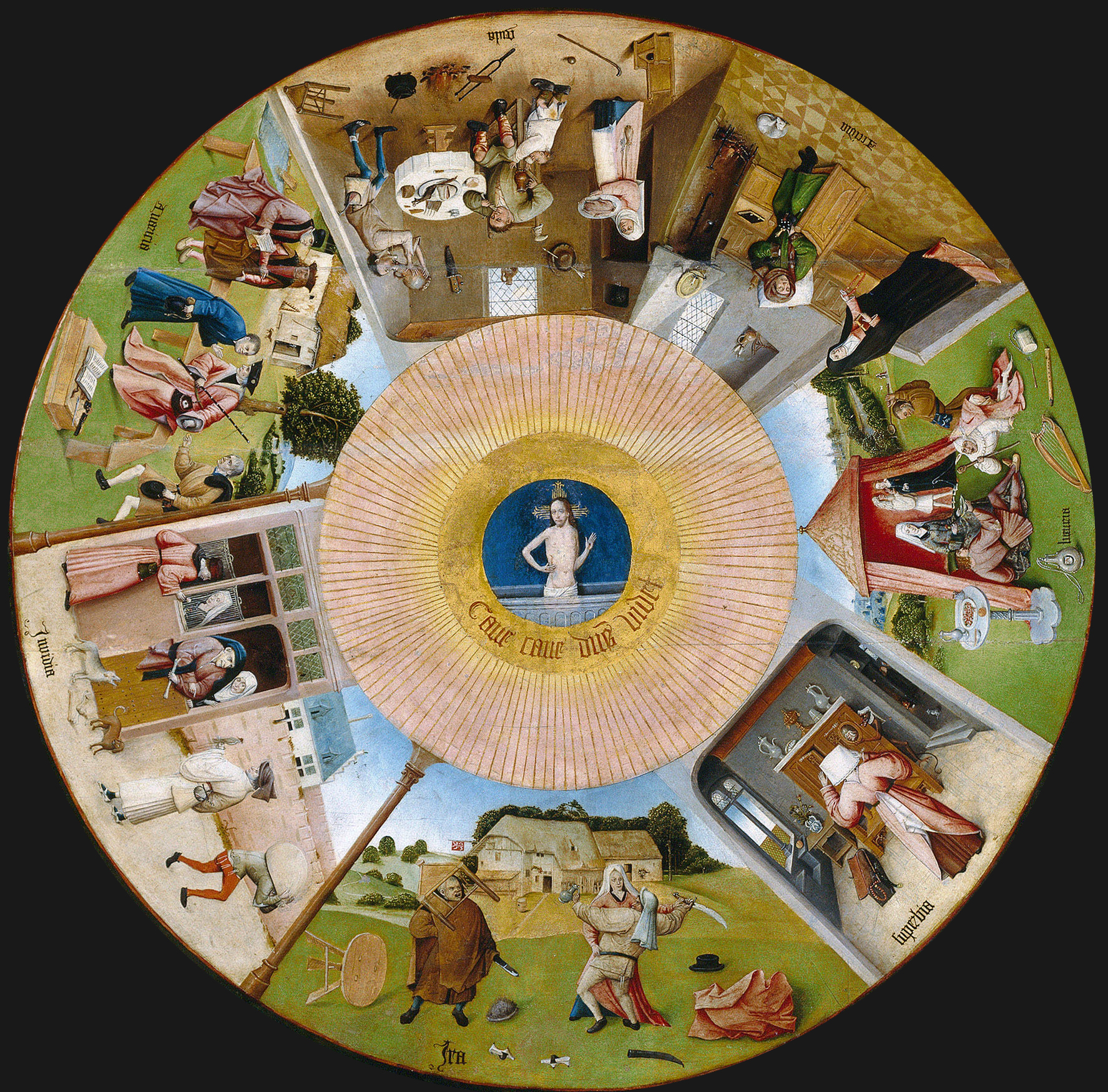
The album is inspired by the theme of the seven deadly sins.

The album takes the seven deadly sins as its thematic foundation, delving deeply into the origins and multifaceted nature of desire within both consciousness and the subconscious. It conveys the central idea that "desire is not a sin". Desire is an innate human instinct, while pleasure represents the reward and culmination that arise from the sublimation of desire. However, beneath pleasure lie complex human conditions such as pain, guilt, anxiety, and vulnerability.

In 2022, Tsai began to focus on the concept of pleasure after watching a documentary, which prompted her to reflect on her own understanding of the nature of pleasure. She candidly admitted that she had never truly paused to consider "what do I like", and she recognized that societal definitions of "needs" are often laden with prejudice—frequently dismissing deep-seated desires and devaluing superficial pleasures, thereby rendering pleasure a taboo topic. Through this album, she aims to openly confront personal desires while challenging the collective subconscious repression of desire.

Tsai was also inspired by Alain de Botton's reinterpretation of the seven deadly sins within everyday contexts. For instance, he frames pride as a yearning for a sense of existence and understands anger as an emotional response to misunderstood pain. These perspectives not only sparked her interest in the seven deadly sins but also encouraged her to reevaluate her own connection to these human conditions. She believes that so-called sins are manifestations of human vulnerability, and when we bravely face and accept them, pleasure can emerge.

== Artwork and packaging ==
The album was released in two versions: "Garden of Sins" and "Rebirth of Pleasure", visually exploring the dual themes of sin and desire. Creative direction for both versions was led by The Squared Division, with packaging design by Special Offer, Inc.

The "Garden of Sins" version draws inspiration from medieval spell books, interweaving elements of ancient legends and mythology. It features seven distinct covers, each symbolizing one of the seven deadly sins, portraying the dark facets of human nature and the forbidden allure of transgression. The visual concept was directed by Korean photographer Cho Gi-seok, who artfully incorporated symbols of temptation such as apples and roses to evoke the hidden, enchanted ambiance of a medieval garden.

In contrast, the "Rebirth of Pleasure" version was shot in the United States by American photographer Brian Ziff. This version presents Tsai as a high priestess standing atop a mythical apocalyptic tower, with dramatic lighting and styling that evoke the presence of a divine figure. One notable look—featuring a metallic spine—symbolizes transformation from vulnerability to resilience. The overall visual and packaging design draws from motifs of the "Gate of Purgatory" and the "Book of Oracles", representing a journey of introspection and the pursuit of the unknown.

== Release and promotion ==
On July 15, 2025, Tsai announced that the album would be released digitally worldwide on July 25, 2025, at 3:00 p.m., with physical pre-orders opening on July 16, 2025, at 12:00 p.m. The album will be available in two versions: "Rebirth of Pleasure" and "Garden of Sins." The "Rebirth of Pleasure" version is scheduled for release on September 2, 2025, followed by the "Garden of Sins" version on September 26, 2025. Additionally, Tsai will host a special album preview event titled "Pleasure Wonderland" on July 22, 2025 in Taipei, Taiwan, where she will personally share insights into the creative process behind the album. On July 26, 2025, Tsai partnered with Kuaishou to hold an album listening event in Nanjing, China, where she also shared the creative journey and insights behind the album. On August 6, 2025, Tsai launched Pleasure Talks, a podcast series in which she provides a detailed insight into the creative process behind her album. On September 24, 2025, Warner announced that the release of the "Garden of Sins" version, originally scheduled for September 26, would be postponed to October 30 due to extended production and packaging time. On November 2, 2025, Tsai hosted an album signing event at the outdoor amphitheater of the Taipei Music Center. On April 2, 2026, Tsai announced that the liquid-filled vinyl edition of the album would be available for pre-order until May 15, 2026, and would be released on August 31, 2026.

=== Singles ===
The lead single "Pleasure" was released at midnight on May 28, 2025, and reached number one on the KKBox Overall New Songs Real-Time Chart within an hour of its release. By 10 a.m. the same day, it had garnered nearly 100,000 plays on YouTube Music. On its first day, the single topped the daily chart of Tencent Music's UNI Chart. It also achieved number one positions on several other charts, including the KKBox Taiwan Daily Chart, KKBox Singapore Daily Chart, Apple Music Taiwan Top Songs Chart, and iTunes Taiwan Top Songs Chart. The single peaked at number two on both the Billboard Taiwan Songs chart and Tencent's UNI Chart, marking its highest weekly ranking. The music video premiered on June 6, 2025. Directed by Christian Breslauer, the video was filmed at Universal Studios Hollywood, where three studios were exclusively reserved to construct six elaborate sets. Inspired by the concept of the seven deadly sins, the music video features Tsai portraying six distinct characters, seamlessly blending choreography with martial arts sequences. The post-production process spanned two months and involved multiple Hollywood visual effects teams.

The second single "DIY" was released at midnight on June 27, 2025, debuting at number nine on Tencent's UNI Chart in its first week. The music video was released on August 1, 2025, directed by Christian Breslauer, and continues the thematic style of the previous single, "Pleasure". It was filmed at Universal Studios Hollywood, with post-production animation and visual effects taking three months to complete.

=== Music videos ===
The music video for the track "Pillow" was released on August 29, 2025. It was directed by Jeremy Qin and features Thai actor Thanapob Leeratanakachorn. It depicts an actress who gradually develops authentic emotions for the male lead during the filming process. The narrative shifts between a contemporary film set and a "story within a story", with the director crafting six scenes that pay homage to 1980s Hollywood. These scenes incorporate nostalgic elements alongside a romantic atmosphere.

The music video for the track "Fish Love" premiered on December 9, 2025, and was directed by Rodrigo Inada.

=== Live performances ===
On June 21, 2025, Tsai served as the closing performer at the 2025 Hito Music Awards ceremony, where she performed "Pleasure" for the first time. On July 25, 2025, Jiangsu TV launched the music variety show Hit 2025, with Tsai performing "Pleasure" in the premiere episode. On August 24, 2025, Tsai delivered the grand finale performance at the 6th Tencent Music Entertainment Awards, featuring "Pleasure", "Fish Love", "Pillow", and "DIY". Global People described the performance as "a powerful testament to the perseverance and innovation of C-pop artists". On September 6, 2025, Tsai attended the "Pleasure Rave" pop-up event at Cafe From Mars, a coffee shop in Taipei, where she performed unplugged versions of the tracks "Fish Love" and "Pillow" for the audience. On November 2, 2025, Tsai held an album signing event at the outdoor amphitheater of the Taipei Music Center, where she performed unplugged versions of "Pleasure", "Pillow", "Fish Love", and "Inside Out".

=== Touring ===
On April 28, 2025, Mirror Media reported that Tsai is planning to launch a new concert tour with eight performances scheduled at the Taipei Dome in December of the same year, running from Christmas through New Year's Eve. This will mark her first performance at the Taipei Dome, and she is set to become the first female artist to hold eight consecutive shows at the venue. Each concert is expected to accommodate approximately 40,000 attendees, with a total projected audience of up to 320,000 people. On October 31, 2025, Tsai announced that she would kick off the Pleasure World Tour at the Taipei Dome on December 30, 2025.

== Critical reception ==
Professional ratings
Review scores
Source	Rating
PlayMusic	90/100

Pleasure received a score of 90 from PlayMusic, which described it as one of Tsai's most rewarding works to revisit. The album was praised for its meticulous production and tightly arranged tracklist, with virtually no superfluous content, reflecting Tsai's departure from conventional commercial considerations. Boldly embracing a full dance-pop approach, the album fuses Western rhythms with classical elements, resulting in a diverse and richly layered sound. Thematically, it spans from flirtation and playfulness to social critique, showcasing Tsai's ambition to push musical boundaries. While it may initially come across as flamboyant, deeper listening reveals its intricate structure and thoughtful details.

The judging panel of the 37th Golden Melody Awards stated that the album concretized the creator's musical vision and artistic aspirations, demonstrating a comprehensive integration of every stage of the pop music production process while establishing a distinctive aesthetic without deliberately following contemporary trends. The judges further noted that the album excelled in vocal recording, citing its tone, dynamic control, and overall sonic aesthetics, as well as its balance across diverse musical styles, internationally oriented production approach, sophisticated mixing, and high overall production quality. Regarding Tsai's vocal performance, the judges commented that she demonstrated a thorough understanding and effective use of her vocal characteristics, delivering a wide range of nuanced techniques throughout the album. They also highlighted her seamless transitions between Mandarin and English vocals and the album's consistent realization of its original creative concept, concluding that both her performance and the album as a whole were of an international standard.

== Commercial performance ==
Within 12 hours of its digital pre-order opening, the album surpassed 100,000 sales on QQ Music in China, becoming the fastest album by a Hong Kong or Taiwanese female singer to receive a "Triple Platinum" certification. It also topped QQ Music's Daily Best-Selling Chart on its release day. On the day of its official release, it set a record as the fastest album by a Hong Kong or Taiwanese female singer to receive a "Diamond" certification on QQ Music. By the end of 2025, the album had sold over 220,000 digital copies in China, ranking fifth on the annual digital album sales chart and first among C-pop female singers. As of June 16, 2026, sales had exceeded 333,000 copies, with revenue surpassing RMB 10 million.

The physical album was released exclusively in Taiwan, with pre-orders running from July 16 to 31, 2025. During the pre-order period, only sales from Pok'elai and Eslite were included in their respective charts, while sales from other retailers were counted from the official release date. The album topped Pok'elai's overall CD best-selling chart for three consecutive weeks during the pre-order period and ranked first on Eslite's overall best-selling chart on its first day of pre-order. Following its release, it topped both the Pok'elai's CD best-selling chart and Eslite's best-selling chart in its first week. On Five Music's Chinese Music Weekly Chart, it debuted at number two before topping the chart for three consecutive weeks. On Chia Chia's Chinese Music Weekly Chart, it also debuted at number two, followed by five consecutive weeks at number one.

In the 2025 year-end charts, the album ranked first on Eslite's Asian Music Year-End Chart, second on Pok'elai's Chinese Album Year-End Chart, and third on both Five Music's Mandarin Music Year-End Chart and Chia Chia's Year-End Chart, ranking highest among female singers on all four charts and becoming the best-selling album by a Taiwanese female singer of the year. In July 2026, Pok'elai ranked the album second on its first-half 2026 overall CD chart, the highest position among albums by female singers.

Weekly performance of major record retail charts in Mandarin-speaking regions (Note: Only record retailers with accessible historical chart records are included.)
Date range	Taiwan (Physical copies）			China （Digital copies）	
Date range	Five Music （Chinese music） (Note: Pre-order sales data are not included in chart rankings and are only counted once the album has been shipped.)	Chia Chia （Chinese music）	Pok'elai (Overall)	QQ Music (Overall)	KuGou Music (Overall)
2025/5/23—2025/5/29 (Note: Digital album pre-orders began in China.)	—N/a		—N/a	2	2
2025/5/30—2025/6/5	—N/a		—N/a	3	5
2025/6/6—2025/6/12	—N/a		—N/a	6	8
2025/6/13—2025/6/19	—N/a		—N/a	7	8
2025/6/20—2025/6/26	—N/a		—N/a	5	7
2025/6/27—2025/7/3	—N/a		—N/a	3	10
2025/7/4—2025/7/10	—N/a		—N/a	13	17
2025/7/11—2025/7/17 (Note: Physical album pre-orders began in Taiwan.)	—N/a		1	16	19
2025/7/18—2025/7/24	—N/a		1	16	4
2025/7/25—2025/7/31	—N/a		1	1	3
2025/8/1—2025/8/7 (Note: Physical album pre-orders ended in Taiwan.)	—N/a		—N/a	2	7
2025/8/8—2025/8/14	—N/a		—N/a	7	11
2025/8/15—2025/8/21	—N/a		—N/a	7	12
2025/8/22—2025/8/28	—N/a		—N/a	7	7
2025/8/29—2025/9/4 (Note: The standard edition of the physical album was released in Taiwan.)	2	2	1	8	8
2025/9/5—2025/9/11	1	1	2	9	13
2025/9/12—2025/9/18	1	1	4	10	11
2025/9/19—2025/9/25	1	1	7	11	15
2025/9/26—2025/10/2	2	1	9	13	17
2025/10/3—2025/10/9	1	1	9	17	20
2025/10/10—2025/10/16	3	2	—	14	19
2025/10/17—2025/10/23	3	3	11	19	19
2025/10/24—2025/10/30 (Note: The limited edition of the physical album was released in Taiwan.)	2	1	1	18	17
2025/10/31—2025/11/6	3	1	5	11	15
2025/11/7—2025/11/13	2	1	6	14	16
2025/11/14—2025/11/20	3	1	7	13	19
2025/11/21—2025/11/27	3	4	8	16	15
2025/11/28—2025/12/4	3	2	12	11	14
2025/12/5—2025/12/11	2	1	8	10	9
2025/12/12—2025/12/18	2	4	9	8	10
2025/12/19—2025/12/25	4	7	60	11	11
2025/12/26—2026/1/1	5	6	9	3	5
2026/1/2—2026/1/8	3	2	2	2	5
2026/1/9—2026/1/15	15	3	49	4	5
2026/1/16—2026/1/22	4	1	14	4	3
2026/1/23—2026/1/29	15	4	40	6	6
2026/1/30—2026/2/5	—	6	54	7	14
2026/2/6—2026/2/12	11	—	21	10	11
2026/2/13—2026/2/19	—	—	—	10	13
2026/2/20—2026/2/26	2	—	—	10	10
2026/2/27—2026/3/5	—	17	52	8	6
2026/3/6—2026/3/12	—	—	13	3	4
2026/3/13—2026/3/19	—	—	9	3	5
2026/3/20—2026/3/26	—	19	69	6	5
2026/3/27—2026/4/2 (Note: Pre-orders for the vinyl edition of the physical album began in Taiwan.)	—	15	2	5	6
2026/4/3—2026/4/9	—	—	2	4	6
2026/4/10—2026/4/16	—	17	7	6	6
2026/4/17—2026/4/23	—	—	13	4	4
2026/4/24—2026/4/30	—	—	4	4	4
2026/5/1—2026/5/7	—	—	5	5	4
2026/5/8—2026/5/14	—	—	4	4	6
2026/5/15—2026/5/21 (Note: Pre-orders for the vinyl edition of the physical album ended in Taiwan.)	—	—	16	5	4
2026/5/22—2026/5/28	—	—	25	7	5
2026/5/29—2026/6/4	—	—	69	7	5
2026/6/5—2026/6/11	—	—	89	2	3
2026/6/12—2026/6/18	—	—	54	3	4
2026/6/19—2026/6/25	5	15	16	4	3
2026/6/26—2026/7/2	10	11	7	3	4
2026/7/3—2026/7/9	—	—	23	7	8
2026/7/10—2026/7/16	—	—	88	11	11
2026/7/17—2026/7/23	—	—	48	6	8
2026/7/24—2026/7/30	—	—	—	9	8
2026/7/31—2026/8/6	—	19	53	8	8
2026/8/7—2026/8/13	—	—	88	8	4
2026/8/14—2026/8/20	—	—	27	9	13
2026/8/21—2026/8/27	8	—	35	21	20
2026/8/28—2026/9/3 (Note: The vinyl edition of the physical album was released in Taiwan.)	3	1	7	17	15
2026/9/4—2026/9/10	1	1	47	19	—
2026/9/11—2026/9/17	1	1	6	13	20
2026/9/18—2026/9/24	3	—	11	19	—
2026/9/25—2026/10/1	6	—	79	21	—
2026/10/2—2026/10/8	2	—	24	19	—
2026/10/9—2026/10/15	1	—	41	—	—
2026/10/16—2026/10/22	11	—	29	—	—
2026/10/23—2026/10/29	12	—	82	—	—

== Awards and achievements ==
On August 24, 2025, Tsai won Most Influential Hong Kong/Taiwan Female Singer at the 6th Tencent Music Entertainment Awards for her work on the album. On December 2, 2025, the nominees for the Asian Pop Music Awards 2025 were revealed. The album received a nomination for Best Album of the Year, while the music video for "Pleasure" was nominated for Best Music Video. Tsai was nominated for Best Female Artist, and along with Jackson Dimiglio-Wood and Richard Craker, she earned a nomination for Best Lyricist for their collaboration on "DIY". Additionally, Tsai and her production team were nominated for Best Producer for their work on the album. Later, on December 31, 2025, the music video for "Pleasure" won Best Music Video, and the album was recognized as one of the Top 20 Best Albums of the Year.

On January 25, 2026, the album's related podcast series Pleasure Talks won Top New Podcasts of the Year. On January 28, 2026, the complete list of the 2025 Hit FM Top 100 Singles was announced, three tracks from the album charted, with "Pleasure" ranking fifth, "DIY" ranking sixteenth, and "Pillow" placing twenty-ninth. Tsai also became the only C-pop female artist to be ranked within the top ten that year. In addition, the album was selected as one of the 2025 Hit FM Top 10 Albums of the Year. On February 10, 2026, the album was selected as one of the Top 10 Mandarin Albums of 2025 by the Chinese Music Awards.

On May 13, 2026, the 37th Golden Melody Awards announced its nominees, with the album receiving the most nominations at nine, including Album of the Year, Best Mandarin Album, Best Vocal Recording Album, "Pleasure" for Song of the Year, "DIY" for Best Music Arrangement, and "Pleasure" and "Fish Love" for Best Music Video, while Tsai was nominated for Best Mandarin Female Singer and Best Album Producer alongside Starr Chen. On May 23, 2026, Tsai won Best Female Singer, Favorite Female Singer, and Most Chart Entries Singer at the 2026 Hito Music Awards, while "Pleasure" was selected as one of the Top 10 Chinese Songs of the Year. On June 17, 2026, the nominees for the 4th Wave Music Awards were announced. The album was nominated for Best Pop Album and Album of the Year, while the song, "Pleasure", and its music video were nominated for Production of the Year and Best Music Video, respectively. Tsai was also nominated for Best Female Singer. Ultimately, "Pleasure" won Production of the Year, while Tsai won Best Female Singer.

On June 27, 2026, the album won the Album of the Year and Best Vocal Recording Album awards at the 37th Golden Melody Awards, while Tsai won Best Mandarin Female Singer. The album, along with Chang Chen-yue's Go With the Flow, tied as one of the two most awarded works of the ceremony. This brought her total number of Golden Melody Awards to nine, surpassing Tanya Chua's eight and making her once again the most awarded Mandopop female artist in the awards' history. On June 29, 2026, Tsai won the Most Popular Female Singer (Hong Kong/Taiwan) award at the 33th Chinese Top Ten Music Awards. On August 16, 2026, Tsai received the Most Influential Hong Kong/Taiwan Female Singer at the 7th Tencent Music Entertainment Awards for the album.

== Track listing ==
No.	Title	Writer(s)	Producer(s)	Length
1.	"Layers"	Jolin Tsai; Nick Lee; Ross Golan	Nick Lee; Ross Golan	2:56
2.	"The Divine Comedy: Purgatorio" (interlude)		Starr Chen; Jolin Tsai	0:48
3.	"Seven"	Jolin Tsai; Greeny Wu; Richard Craker	Jolin Tsai; Starr Chen; Richard Craker	2:37
4.	"Pleasure"	Jolin Tsai; Ross Golan; Richard Craker; Valentina Ploy (Note: Music only); Tom Wang (Note: Lyrics only)	Jolin Tsai; Starr Chen; Richard Craker	2:48
5.	"Safari"	Jolin Tsai; Mark Carl Stolinski Williams; Raul Ignacio Cubina; GG Ramirez; James Norton	Ojivolta	2:26
6.	"Inside Out"	Jolin Tsai; Anders Gukko; Sandra Wikström; The Crane; Razor Chiang	Jolin Tsai	3:23
7.	"Woman's Work"	Jolin Tsai; Jenna Andrews; Stephen Eric Kirk; Joe Kirk	Jenna Andrews; Stephen Eric Kirk	2:13
8.	"Pillow"	Jolin Tsai; Abigail Frances Jones; A-Hao; Starr Chen	Jolin Tsai	3:52
9.	"DIY"	Jolin Tsai; Jackson Dimiglio-Wood; Richard Craker	Jolin Tsai; Starr Chen; Richard Craker	3:04
10.	"Hush Little Baby" (interlude)		Jolin Tsai; Starr Chen	1:04
11.	"Good Girl" (我超會)	Jolin Tsai; Cheer Chen; Jackson Dimiglio-Wood; Richard Craker; Stephen Jones	Jolin Tsai; Starr Chen; Richard Craker	2:49
12.	"Fish Love"	Jolin Tsai; Mattheos Herbert Weedon; Theodore Geoffrey Weedon; Tom Martin; Riley Biederer	Jolin Tsai; Starr Chen	3:10
13.	"Bloody Mary"	Jolin Tsai; Choice37; Hae; Se.A; Sonny; Lil G; Zayvo	Jolin Tsai; Starr Chen	2:51
Total length:				34:03

== Personnel ==
Personnel adapted from Tsai's official website.

- BB Road Studio, Taipei — recording studio
- Mega Force Studio, New Taipei — recording studio
- Platinum Recording Studio, Taipei — recording studio
- Lights Up Studio, Taipei — recording studio
- Paramount Recording Studios, Los Angeles — recording studio
- Dale Becker — mastering engineering
- Becker Mastering, Pasadena — mastering studio
- Kegn Venegas — mastering assistantance
- Katie Harvey — mastering assistantance
- Adam Burt — mastering assistantance

Track #1

- Nick Lee — production, vocal production, arrangement
- Ross Golan — co-production, vocal production
- Jolin Tsai — vocal production, backing vocals
- Lin Jie — production assistance
- Jenna Andrews — backing vocal arrangement
- AJ Chen — vocal recording engineering
- Xavier Daniel — vocal recording engineering
- Josh Gudwin — mixing engineering

Track #2

- Starr Chen — production, arrangement
- Jolin Tsai — production
- A-Hao — arrangement
- Richard Craker — arrangement
- Morrison Ma — arrangement
- CYH — arrangement
- Wayne Lin — arrangement
- Lin Jie — production assistance

Track #3

- Jolin Tsai — production, vocal production, backing vocals, backing vocal arrangement
- Starr Chen — production, arrangement
- Richard Craker — production, vocal production, arrangement
- A-Hao — arrangement
- Morrison Ma — arrangement
- CYH — arrangement
- Lin Jie — production assistance
- AJ Chen — vocal recording engineering
- Josh Gudwin — mixing engineering

Track #4

- Jolin Tsai — production, vocal production, backing vocals, backing vocal arrangement
- Starr Chen — production, arrangement
- Richard Craker — production, arrangement
- A-Hao — arrangement
- Morrison Ma — arrangement
- CYH — arrangement
- Lin Jie — production assistance
- AJ Chen — vocal recording engineering
- Jon Castelli — mixing engineering

Track #5

- Ojivolta — production, arrangement
- Jolin Tsai — vocal production, backing vocals
- Keith Sorrells — vocal production
- Lin Jie — production assistance
- Jenna Andrews — backing vocal arrangement
- AJ Chen — vocal recording engineer
- Chief Wang — vocal recording engineering
- Xavier Daniel — vocal recording engineering
- Jon Castelli — mixing engineering

Track #6

- Jolin Tsai — production, vocal production, backing vocals, backing vocal arrangement
- Ivnt — arrangement
- Lin Jie — production assistance
- AJ Chen — vocal recording engineering
- Phil Tan — mixing engineering

Track #7

- Jenna Andrews — production, vocal production, backing vocal arrangement
- Stephen Eric Kirk — production, arrangement
- Jolin Tsai — vocal production, backing vocals
- AJ Chen — vocal recording engineering
- Chief Wang — vocal recording engineering
- Xavier Daniel — vocal recording engineering
- Josh Gudwin — mixing engineering

Track #8

- Jolin Tsai — production, vocal production, backing vocals, backing vocal arrangement
- Josh Cumbee — arrangement, programming, keyboards, electric guitar, electric bass, additional engineering
- Lin Jie — production assistance
- AJ Chen — vocal recording engineering
- Josh Gudwin — mixing engineering

Track #9

- Jolin Tsai — production, vocal production, backing vocals, backing vocal arrangement
- Starr Chen — production, arrangement
- Richard Craker — production, arrangement
- A-Hao — arrangement
- Morrison Ma — arrangement
- CYH — arrangement
- Jackson Dimiglio-Wood — arrangement
- Lin Jie — production assistance
- AJ Chen — vocal recording engineering
- Phil Tan — mixing engineering
- Dale Becker — master engineering

Track #10

- Jolin Tsai — production
- Starr Chen — production
- Ray Soul — arrangement
- Wayne Lin — arrangement

Track #11

- Jolin Tsai — production, vocal production, backing vocals, backing vocal arrangement
- Starr Chen — production, arrangement
- Richard Craker — production, arrangement
- A-Hao — arrangement
- Morrison Ma — arrangement
- CYH — arrangement
- Jackson Dimiglio-Wood — arrangement
- Lin Jie — production assistance
- AJ Chen — vocal recording engineering
- Phil Tan — mixing engineering

Track #12

- Jolin Tsai — production, vocal production, backing vocals, backing vocal arrangement
- Starr Chen — production, arrangement
- Richard Craker — vocal production
- A-Hao — arrangement
- Morrison Ma — arrangement
- CYH — arrangement
- Tom Martin — arrangement
- Lin Jie — production assistance
- AJ Chen — vocal recording engineering
- Josh Gudwin — mixing engineering

Track #13

- Jolin Tsai — production, vocal production, backing vocals, backing vocal arrangement
- Starr Chen — producer, arrangement
- CYH — arrangement
- Morrison Ma — arrangement
- Lin Jie — production assistance
- AJ Chen — vocal recording engineering
- Jon Castelli — mixing engineering

== Release history ==
Region	Date	Format(s)	Edition(s)	Distributor
Worldwide	July 25, 2025	Streaming; digital download	—N/a	Eternal
Mainland China	July 25, 2025	Streaming; digital download	—N/a	YDX
Taiwan	September 2, 2025	CD	Standard	Warner
Taiwan	October 30, 2025 (Note: Originally scheduled for September 26, 2025)	CD	Limited	Warner
Taiwan	August 31, 2026	Vinyl		Warner
