= Agent J (album) =

2007 studio album by Jolin Tsai

- Standard edition cover

Studio album by Jolin Tsai
- Released: September 21, 2007
- Recorded: January–June 2007
- Genre: Pop
- Length: 42:53
- Label: EMI; Mars
- Producer: Lars Quang; Nik Quang; RnG; Adia; Paul Lee; Michael Lin; Paula Ma; Jamie Hsueh

Jolin Tsai chronology
| Final Wonderland (2007) | Agent J (2007) | Love Exercise (2008) |

Singles from Agent J
- 1. "Agent J" Released: August 25, 2007

Agent J (Chinese: 特務J) is the ninth studio album by Taiwanese singer Jolin Tsai ,released on September 21, 2007, by EMI. The album was produced by Lars Quang, Nik Quang, RnG, Adia, Paul Lee, Michael Lin, Paula Ma, and Jamie Hsueh.

The album sold over 200,000 copies in Taiwan and exceeded 3 million copies across Asia, making it the best-selling album of the year in Taiwan in 2007. Producer Adia won the Best Single Producer award at the 19th Golden Melody Awards for the song "Agent J", while Andrew Chen received the Best Arranger award for the same track.

The album was released simultaneously with a film of the same name, directed by Jeff Chang, Marlboro Lai, and Kuang Sheng, and starring Kim Jae-won, Stephen Fung, and Carl Ng.

== Background and development ==
On December 12, 2006, Tsai revealed that she would begin preparing for her new album in January of the following year. On January 13, 2007, she traveled to London to undertake a three-week program of vocal and dance training. On May 22, 2007, she went to Helsingør for a week-long recording session, and shared that the new album was expected to be released between August and September. Lars Quang composed three new songs for the album.

On June 2, 2007, Tsai completed recording for the new album. On June 8, 2007, she performed the song "Let's Move It", the theme for the Toyota campaign, at a press event for the campaign. The song was later included on the album. The event organizers announced that a nationwide street dance competition would be held on July 15, and the winner would have the opportunity to appear in the music video with Tsai.

On July 9, 2007, Tsai and actor Kim Jae-won filmed a music video in Paris. On August 8, 2007, EMI invested NT$50 million in the production of an 80-minute film of the same name as the album. Divided into three chapters, the film was shot in Paris, London, and Bangkok.

On September 4, 2007, media outlets reported that the album would feature four songs written by Malaysian musicians. On September 11, 2007, all 11 tracks from the album were leaked online. EMI issued an official statement declaring its intent to pursue legal action against those responsible for uploading, downloading, or sharing the files. Tsai expressed sadness over the incident and emphasized the hard work and time that had gone into the album's production.

== Writing and recording ==
The lead single "Agent J" is a rhythm-driven dance track, with the sound of high heels in the intro adding a dramatic flair. "Bravo Lover" is a house-inspired electronic dance song. "Alone" features the sound of a mandolin to evoke a sense of loneliness and helplessness. "Sun Will Never Set" carries a sweet, retro vibe. "Tacit Violence" blends hip-hop and R&B, with lyrics portraying a woman subjected to emotional manipulation by an overly controlling partner. "Priceless" is a contemporary R&B track infused with urban music elements.

"Ideal State" is an upbeat mid-tempo song. "Let's Move It" is built on powerful drumbeats, showcasing the strength of music. "Fear-Free" is a 3/4-time swing tune led by piano, evoking a warm sense of longing. "Metronome", with lyrics penned by Tsai herself, reflects an inner spirit of resilience and competitiveness, with piano and strings adding a touch of melancholy. "Golden Triangle" fuses brass and percussion to convey the mysterious and unsettling nature of love.

== Artwork ==
On the official cover of the album, Tsai wears a black, low-cut, backless leather outfit paired with knee-high boots, designed by Natsuko Kawabe. She also debuts a sleek, side-parted short hairstyle for the first time.

== Release and promotion ==
On August 12, 2007, EMI released a trailer for the album. On August 29, 2007, pre-orders for the album began at 7-Eleven stores across Taiwan. On September 5, 2007, the album became available for pre-order on Taiwan's online marketplace PChome, followed by pre-orders at major record stores across Taiwan on September 7. On September 21, 2007, Tsai held the Agent J Concert in Tamsui, Taiwan. On September 26, 2007, EMI released a deluxe edition of the album, which included ten music videos, four dance versions, and a remix of the song "Bravo Lover". On December 7, EMI released another edition of the album, featuring live performance footage from the Agent J Concert along with an additional music video.

=== Single ===
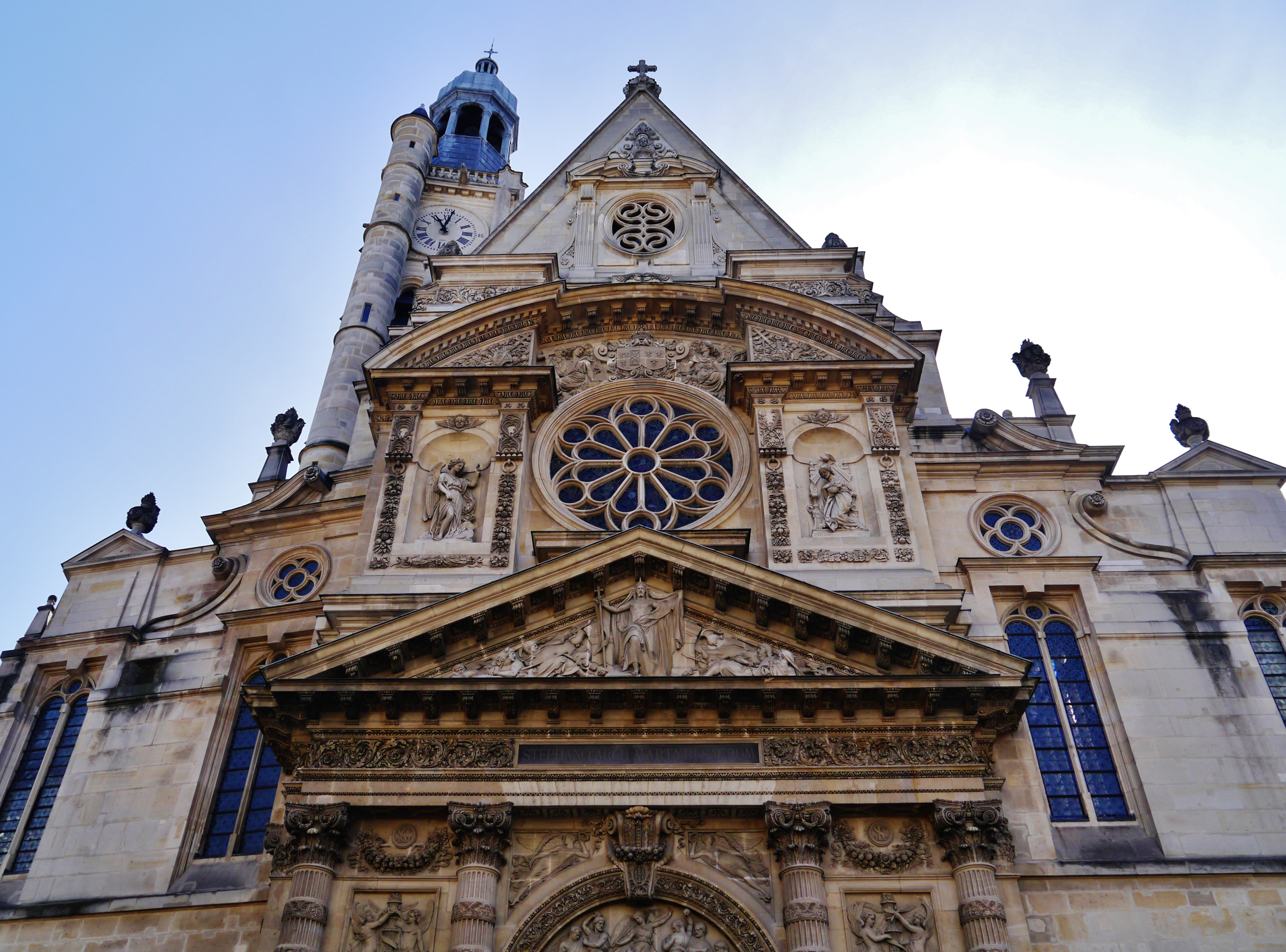
Saint-Étienne-du-Mont, one of the filming locations for the music video of "Agent J"

On August 29, 2007, Tsai released the single "Agent J". On September 3, 2007, the music video for "Agent J", directed by Jeff Chang, was officially released. In the video, Tsai performs aerial silk acrobatics and pole dancing. She remarked: "After several days of practice, I felt like the entire right side of my body was about to give out—probably because I'm right-handed! These two dance forms involve completely different types of apparatus—one soft, one rigid—and both require spinning movements in the air. With aerial silks, you have to learn to become one with the fabric. But the pole is rigid, and you can't rely on brute strength; you have to learn how to master and flow with it."

=== Music videos ===
On September 15, 2007, Tsai released the music video for "Fear-Free", directed by Jeff Chang. On September 17, 2007, the music video for "Bravo Lover", directed by Marlboro Lai, was released. On October 1, 2007, Tsai released the music video for "Alone", also directed by Jeff Chang. On October 10, 2007, she released the music video for "Sun Will Never Set", directed by Marlboro Lai. On October 24, 2007, the music video for "Tacit Violence", directed by Kuang Sheng, was released. On November 5, 2007, Tsai released the music video for "Priceless", also directed by Kuang Sheng. On November 29, 2007, she released the music video for "Paradise", directed by Marlboro Lai. In addition, the music video for "Triangle" was directed by Kuang Sheng, while the music video for "Metronome" was directed by Marlboro Lai. On December 6, 2007, Tsai released the music video for "Let's Move It", also directed by Marlboro Lai.

=== Live performances ===
On September 24, 2007, Tsai performed at the Hito Mid-Autumn Concert, where she sang "Bravo Lover" and "Fear-Free". On October 24, 2007, she participated in the opening ceremony of the 16th China Golden Rooster and Hundred Flowers Film Festival, performing "Agent J" at the event. On December 26, 2007, Tsai attended the 2007 Metro Radio Hits Music Awards, where she performed "Agent J" and "Fear-Free". On December 31, 2007, she performed at the New Year's Eve Concert in Taichung, singing "Agent J", "Alone", and "Sun Will Never Set". That same day, Tsai also participated in the New Year's Eve Concert in Taipei, where she performed "Tacit Violence", "Fear-Free", and "Sun Will Never Set".

On January 9, 2008, Tsai appeared on the Zhejiang TV variety show Sing 2008, where she performed "Bravo Lover". The following day, January 10, 2008, she participated in the Love from the Strait variety show on Southeast TV, performing "Agent J", "Alone", "Ideal State", "Sun Will Never Set", "Fear-Free", and "Bravo Lover". On January 11, 2008, Tsai took part in the M Conference, where she performed "Sun Will Never Set" and "Agent J". On January 13, she appeared at the 2nd Migu Music Awards, performing "Agent J" and "Bravo Lover". On January 23, 2008, Tsai attended the 2007 Beijing Pop Music Awards, where she performed "Agent J".

On March 1, 2008, she performed at the 2008 Hito Music Awards, singing "Agent J", "Bravo Lover", and "Sun Will Never Set". On April 7, 2008, Tsai participated in the 2007 Music Radio China Top Chart Awards, where she performed "Agent J". The following day, she appeared on The Same Song on CCTV, where she performed "Agent J" and "Sun Will Never Set". On April 28, 2008, she performed "Sun Will Never Set" at the 4th China International Cartoon & Animation Festival Opening Ceremony. Subsequently, Tsai participated in various events held across different locations, where she performed songs from the album.

== Commercial performance ==
On September 15, 2007, EMI announced that the album had surpassed 80,000 pre-orders in Taiwan during its first week of availability. On September 28, 2007, the album debuted at number one on the weekly sales charts of Taiwan's G-Music and Five Music stores. By October 2, 2007, EMI confirmed that the album's sales in Taiwan had exceeded 150,000 copies. On January 4, 2008, Five Music declared the album the top-selling album of 2007 in Taiwan. One week later, G-Music also announced it as the best-selling album of the year. Additionally, the single "Agent J" ranked number 14 on Taiwan's Hit FM Top 100 Singles Chart for 2007, while "Sun Will Never Set" and "Bravo Lover" secured number one and number 41 positions, respectively.

== Critical reception ==
Sina Music's review praised the album for continuing Tsai's diverse musical style, encompassing both dance tracks and ballads, while effectively highlighting her sensuality and passion. The overall quality of the songs was deemed strong and well-suited to the tastes of Taiwanese music fans. Although some tracks may not surpass the surprises found in her previous albums Magic (2003) or Castle (2004), the album still conveyed a fresh feeling and successfully depicted the mindset of modern women. The review also noted that, despite Tsai's solid vocal skills, her pronunciation and enunciation could use improvement. Overall, the album was regarded as a noteworthy work.

MTV Mandarin commented that the slower songs on the album outperformed the dance tracks, observing that Tsai showed progress in mastering ballads. In contrast, the dance numbers leaned more heavily on visual appeal and choreography, failing to fully embody the depth of the album's secret agent concept. ERS Chinese Top Ten pointed out that the uptempo songs fused fashionable and retro elements with attractive appeal but lacked innovation, and the lyrics felt somewhat overloaded. Overall, the album was seen as a continuation of the style established in Dancing Diva (2006), without significant breakthroughs.

Musician Qu Shicong praised the production quality and appreciated the involvement of Danish producers but felt the melodies were somewhat weak, with some tracks lacking the energetic punch expected from Tsai. Musician Keith Chan remarked that while Tsai's image packaging remained impressive, the album's fast and slow songs were relatively uniform, missing mid-tempo and other varieties, which made the overall structure somewhat monotonous.

Tencent Entertainment's review noted that although the uptempo songs were slightly less vibrant than those in Dancing Diva, attention to detail had improved. The retro disco-style tracks represented another successful experiment for Tsai. The collaboration with her first musical film was also seen as a factor likely to draw increased attention. ERC Chinese Top Ten highlighted Tsai's greatest appeal in her performance and hard work, especially in music videos, but criticized the music itself as relatively monotonous, lacking memorable moments akin to "The Spirit of Knight" or "Dancing Diva". Global Chinese Music Chart regarded the album as flashy overall but lacking surprises, especially pointing out that the lead singles failed to successfully transition or convey a retro feel.

Sina Entertainment commented that despite the high production quality, Tsai performed better on the slower ballads, while the uptempo tracks lacked freshness. Some lyrics were also criticized as superficial. The review concluded that although Tsai's diligent and hardworking image continues to attract fans, the album fell short of the musical innovation and melodic quality of her previous works, presenting a somewhat uniform style without breakthroughs.

== Accolades ==
On December 16, 2007, the music video for the song "Agent J" won the Best Music Video at the 2007 TVB8 Mandarin Music On Demand Awards. On December 26, 2007, Tsai was awarded the Best Asian Artist and the Most Popular Singer in the 2007 Metro Radio Hits Music Awards. The song "Agent J" also received the Best Mandarin Song. On January 12, 2008, Tsai was recognized as one of the Top 3 Most Popular Female Singers and the Most Searched Female Artist at the 2007 Baidu Boiling Point Awards. The following day, January 13, 2008, she was honored as the Best Selling Female Singer of the Year at the 2nd Migu Music Awards. On January 14, 2008, the song "Sun Will Never Set" won the Top 10 Mandarin Songs of the Year at the Canadian Chinese Pop Music Awards.

On January 23, 2008, Tsai was awarded the Most Popular Hong Kong/Taiwan Female Singer at the 2007 Beijing Pop Music Awards, with "Sun Will Never Set" also winning the Song of the Year. On January 31, 2008, Tsai was named one of the Top 10 Singers of the Year and Best Female Singer at the 3rd KKBox Music Awards. On February 28, 2008, she received the Top 10 Singers of the Year and Outstanding Dance Performance Singer at the 2nd Family Music Awards, with the album also being recognized as one of the Top 10 Albums of the Year. On March 1, 2008, Tsai won the Best Female Singer at the 2008 Hito Music Awards, and her album was awarded the Most Long-Lasting Album. "Sun Will Never Set" was named Listener's Favorite Song and one of the Top 10 Mandarin Songs of the Year.

On March 11, 2008, Tsai received the Most Popular Female Artist at the 2007 Music Pioneer Awards. On April 8, 2008, the music video for "Agent J" won the Best Music Video at the 8th Top Chinese Music Awards. On April 12, 2008, Tsai was named the Most Popular Female Singer and Best Selling Female Artist at the Music Radio China Top Chart Awards, with "Agent J" also receiving the Best Song in the Hong Kong/Taiwan category. On June 14, 2008, Tsai was nominated for the Favorite Artist Taiwan at the MTV Asia Awards 2008.

On July 5, 2008, Adia and Andrew Chen won the Best Single Producer and Best Music Arrangement at the 19th Golden Melody Awards for their work on "Agent J". On October 25, 2008, Tsai received the Asian Media Female Artist Award at the 14th Singapore Hit Awards. On October 30, 2008, she was awarded the Most Popular Female Singer, Best Taiwanese Female Singer, and Best Stage Performance at the 8th Global Chinese Music Awards, with "Sun Will Never Set" being named one of the Top 20 Most Popular Songs. On November 16, 2008, Tsai was named the Most Popular Taiwanese Female Singer at the 9th CCTV-MTV Music Awards. On December 15, 2008, she was named the Best Hong Kong/Taiwan Female Artist of the Year at the 2008 Tencent Stars Awards.

== Track listing ==
Agent J – Standard / Limited / Champion Special / Special Celebration edition
| No. | Title | Lyrics | Music | Producer(s) | Length |
|---|---|---|---|---|---|
| 1. | "Agent J" (特務J) | Sunny Lee; Matthew Yen; Neoh Kim Hin | Ooi Teng Fong | Adia | 3:35 |
| 2. | "Bravo Lover" (愛無赦) | Issac Chen | Lina Rafn; Adam Powers; Paw Lagermann | Adia | 3:53 |
| 3. | "Alone" (一個人) | Al Kuan | Eric Ng | Paula Ma | 4:41 |
| 4. | "Fear-Free" (怕什麼) | Cheng Shu-fei | Paul Lee | Paul Lee | 4:35 |
| 5. | "Ideal State" (桃花源) | Alang Huang | Kaede Chang | Paul Lee | 3:32 |
| 6. | "Prologue of Tacit Violence" (冷·前言) | | | | 0:21 |
| 7. | "Tacit Violence" (冷·暴力) | Issac Chen; Howard Chiang; Sunny Lee | Nik Quang; Thea Hall; Lars Quang; RnG | Lars Quang; Nik Quang; RnG | 3:01 |
| 8. | "Priceless" (非賣品) | Gino Chen; Ang Swee Giap; Tam Jung Chen | Tam Jung Chen | Michael Lin | 4:33 |
| 9. | "Metronome" (節拍器) | Jolin Tsai | Jamie Hsueh | Derek Lin | 4:38 |
| 10. | "Golden Triangle" (金三角) | Issac Chen | Nik Quang; Lars Quang; RnG; Thea Hall | Lars Quang; Nik Quang; RnG | 3:02 |
| 11. | "Sun Will Never Set" (日不落) | Luke Tsui | Alexander Bard; Anders Hansson | Michael Lin | 3:48 |
| 12. | "Let's Move It" | Bruce Yao | Nik Quang; Lars Quang; RnG; Sasia Nielsen; James Chu | Lars Quang; Nik Quang; RnG | 3:14 |
| Total length: | | | | | 42:53 |

Agent J – Limited edition (DVD)
| No. | Title | Length |
|---|---|---|
| 1. | "Agent J" (film) | 69:44 |
| Total length: | | 69:44 |

Agent J – Champion Special edition (DVD)
| No. | Title | Length |
|---|---|---|
| 1. | "Agent J" (music video) | 3:35 |
| 2. | "Bravo Lover" (music video) | 3:53 |
| 3. | "Alone" (music video) | 4:38 |
| 4. | "Fear-Free" (music video) | 6:06 |
| 5. | "Ideal State" (music video) | 3:32 |
| 6. | "Tacit Violence" (music video) | 3:00 |
| 7. | "Priceless" (music video) | 4:32 |
| 8. | "Metronome" (music video) | 4:39 |
| 9. | "Golden Triangle" (music video) | 3:02 |
| 10. | "Sun Will Never Set" (music video) | 3:42 |
| 11. | "Agent J" (dance video) | 3:35 |
| 12. | "Bravo Lover" (dance video) | 3:53 |
| 13. | "Tacit Violence" (dance video) | 3:00 |
| 14. | "Sun Will Never Set" (dance video) | 1:36 |
| 15. | "Bravo Lover" (Super Rave remix) | 4:14 |
| Total length: | | 56:57 |

Agent J – Special Celebration edition (DVD)
| No. | Title | Length |
|---|---|---|
| 1. | "Agent J Concert" (live video) | 60:34 |
| 2. | "Let's Move It" (music video) | 3:12 |
| Total length: | | 63:46 |

== Release history ==
| Region | Date | Format(s) | Edition | Distributor |
|---|---|---|---|---|
| Various | September 21, 2007 | Streaming | Standard | Mars |
| China | September 21, 2007 | CD; cassette | Standard | Push Typhoon |
| China | October 26, 2007 | DVD; VCD | Champion Special | Push Typhoon |
| China | December 7, 2007 | CD+DVD | Special Celebration | Push Typhoon |
| Taiwan | September 21, 2007 | CD | Standard | EMI |
| Taiwan | September 21, 2007 | CD+DVD | Limited | EMI |
| Taiwan | October 26, 2007 | CD+DVD | Champion Special | EMI |
| Taiwan | December 7, 2007 | CD+DVD | Special Celebration | EMI |
