= DIY (Jolin Tsai song) =

Single by Jolin Tsai

from the album Pleasure
- Language: Mandarin
- Released: June 27, 2025
- Genre: Pop
- Length: 3:04
- Label: Eternal
- Songwriters: Jolin Tsai; Jackson Dimiglio-Wood; Richard Craker
- Producers: Jolin Tsai; Starr Chen; Richard Craker

Jolin Tsai singles chronology
"Pleasure" (2025)	"DIY" (2025)	"Prague Square (Jolin Version)" (2026)

Music videos
- "DIY" on YouTube

"DIY" is a song by Taiwanese singer Jolin Tsai from her fifteenth studio album, Pleasure (2025). It was written by Tsai, Jackson Dimiglio-Wood, and Richard Craker, and produced by Tsai, Starr Chen, and Richard Craker. It was released on June 27, 2025, as the album's second single, through Eternal.

== Background ==
On June 21, 2025, ahead of her appearance at the Hito Music Awards, Tsai revealed via social media that a new song would be released the following week. The next day, she officially announced the single "DIY", scheduled for digital release at midnight on June 27. On June 25, 2025, she released a 15-second audio teaser of the track.

== Composition ==
The lyrics of "DIY" were written by Tsai herself, with the phrase "DIY" repeated throughout the song alongside the chant "do it yourself", set against a powerful rhythm to create a ritualistic atmosphere. The melody was composed by Richard Craker, who previously contributed to "Pleasure", and British songwriter Jackson Dimiglio-Wood. The arrangement was led by Starr Chen, with additional contributions from A-Hao, Morrison Ma, and CYH. To achieve the desired effect, the arrangement went through a total of 34 revisions, reflecting the production team's high creative standards.

Musically, the song blends electropop and trap influences. It opens with a low-frequency synth line that sets a hazy mood. The contrast between high-frequency electronic beats and deep bass enhances the track's dynamic tension. The vocals are layered and processed to create a whispered, intimate feel. In its final section, tribal rhythms are introduced, symbolizing a transformation from restraint to release.

== Theme and artwork ==
"DIY" centers on the body as its primary theme, exploring the connection between physicality and desire. The lyrics advocate for self-awareness and respect for personal needs, encouraging listeners to acknowledge their physical and emotional signals with honesty and courage. Tsai explained that the song responds to how bodily cues are often ignored or distorted in real life, urging a truthful engagement with one's feelings, even in the face of fear or embarrassment. Taking a distinctly female perspective, the song challenges the traditionally male-dominated narrative of desire, promoting bodily autonomy and self-empowerment.

The single's cover art reflects themes of desire, beauty, and power. Tsai is shown reclining languidly on a red latex bed while wearing a vivid red corset. Multiple hands reach out from beneath the bed, symbolizing sensual temptation. The imagery creates intense visual tension and echoes the "Wall of Original Sin" motif from the "Pleasure" music video. The shoot also marked Tsai's first time embracing a more overtly sensual visual style.

== Release and promotion ==
On July 4, 2025, Tsai released a short video titled "The DIY Script Reading Project", in which nine award-winning actresses, Cheryl Yang, Suri Lin, Yen Yi-wen, Vicky Tseng, Cherry Hsieh, Annie Chen, Hsieh Ying-xuan, Chung Hsin-ling, and Yang Kuei-mei, performed a dramatic reading of the song's lyrics. On July 5, 2025, she released a dance practice video for "DIY" in both horizontal and vertical formats.

=== Music video ===
The music video for "DIY" was released on August 1, 2025. Directed by Christian Breslauer, it continued the stylistic and thematic visual narrative established in the previous single, "Pleasure". Filmed at studios in Universal Studios Hollywood, the video's post-production and visual effects took three months to complete.

=== Live performances ===
Tsai debuted her live performance of "DIY" at the 6th Tencent Music Entertainment Awards on August 24, 2025.

== Critical reception ==
Musician Zhang Huiquan praised Tsai for her bold and concise creative expression, noting that the performance of "DIY" was confident and unrestrained. He commended her continued exploration of the boundaries of pop music in both form and content. Another musician, Xiao Hu, highlighted the seductive tension created through rhythm shifts and melodic structures.

Weibo music critic Dai Ruo Mu Yi emphasized the song's high production quality and international appeal. He noted the eclectic structure, which features a Middle Eastern-style hook, R&B verses, a Jersey Club-inspired bridge, and a chorus influenced by dancehall and baile funk. He interpreted the song as a dialogue between body, self, and desire, tackling themes such as female bodily autonomy and the rejection of self-censorship. Compared to "Pleasure", he considered "DIY" more focused, deep, and stylistically fused, demonstrating the growing global relevance of Asian pop music.

Weibo music critic HeyWarWars described the track as a trap-based dance song enhanced by Middle Eastern melodic elements, creating a strong sense of atmosphere and sonic impact. He believed the song surpassed "Pleasure" in popularity and argued that its core message lies in reclaiming agency over one's own emotions and rhythms. He called it a fully realized artistic statement in both concept and execution.

Weibo music critic San Shi Yi Sheng noted that "Pleasure" and "DIY" form a cohesive narrative within the album Pleasure, moving from exploring pleasure to actively seeking it. He highlighted "DIY" as a work that emphasizes internal awareness and individual choice, blending sensuality with detailed production to showcase Tsai's creative control and experimental spirit.

Weibo music critic Liang Xiaohui interpreted the song as a bold lyrical exploration of self-subjectivity. He stated that the concept of "DIY" was redefined to symbolize not just self-action but self-excavation. He saw the song as a continuation of Tsai's past themes of awakening, offering both a practical and philosophical expression of personal autonomy.

Weibo music critic Uncle DC saw "DIY" as an inward turn in Tsai's ongoing exploration of desire, shifting from being seen to truly seeing oneself. Rather than confrontation or declaration, the song uses intimate language to articulate self-acceptance and subjectivity. He described it as a love letter to those uncertain about their desires, underscoring Tsai's maturation in expressing self-love, not by denying desire, but by claiming control in a gentler, more personal way.

== Accolades ==
On December 2, 2025, Tsai, Jackson Dimiglio-Wood, and Richard Craker were nominated for Best Lyricist at the Asian Pop Music Awards 2025 for their work on "DIY". On May 13, 2026, the 37th Golden Melody Awards announced its nominees, with "DIY" receiving a nomination for Best Music Arrangement.

== Commercial performance ==
In its first week, "DIY" debuted at number nine on Tencent Uni Chart weekly ranking.

== Credits and personnel ==
Credits are adapted from the description of the music video for "DIY" on YouTube.

Music

- Jolin Tsai – production, vocal production, backing vocals, backing vocal arrangement
- Starr Chen – production, music arrangement
- Richard Craker – production, music arrangement
- A-Hao – music arrangement
- Morrison Ma – music arrangement
- CYH – music arrangement
- Jackson Dimiglio-Wood – music arrangement
- AJ Chen – vocal recording
- Phil Tan – mixing
- Dale Becker – mastering

Video

- The Squared Division – creative direction, creative production
- Antidote Digital – creative production
- Andrew Lin – creative coordination
- Tseng Yu-hao – creative coordination
- Christian Breslauer – direction
- London Alley – production
- Jenn Khoe – creative production
- Robbie Blue – choreography
- Andy Hsu – choreography consulting
- Ayden Hammer – dance
- Madison Alvarado – dance
- Jordan Laza – dance
- Alyssa Massimiani – dance
- Selena Hamilton – dance

== Charts ==
=== Weekly charts ===
Chart (2025)	Peak position
China (Tencent)	9

== Release history ==
Release dates and formats for "DIY"
Region	Date	Format(s)	Distributor
Various	June 27, 2025	Digital download; streaming	Eternal
China	June 27, 2025	Digital download; streaming	YDX
