= Taipei Dome =

Sports venue in Taipei, Taiwan

Farglory Dome
- Taipei Dome

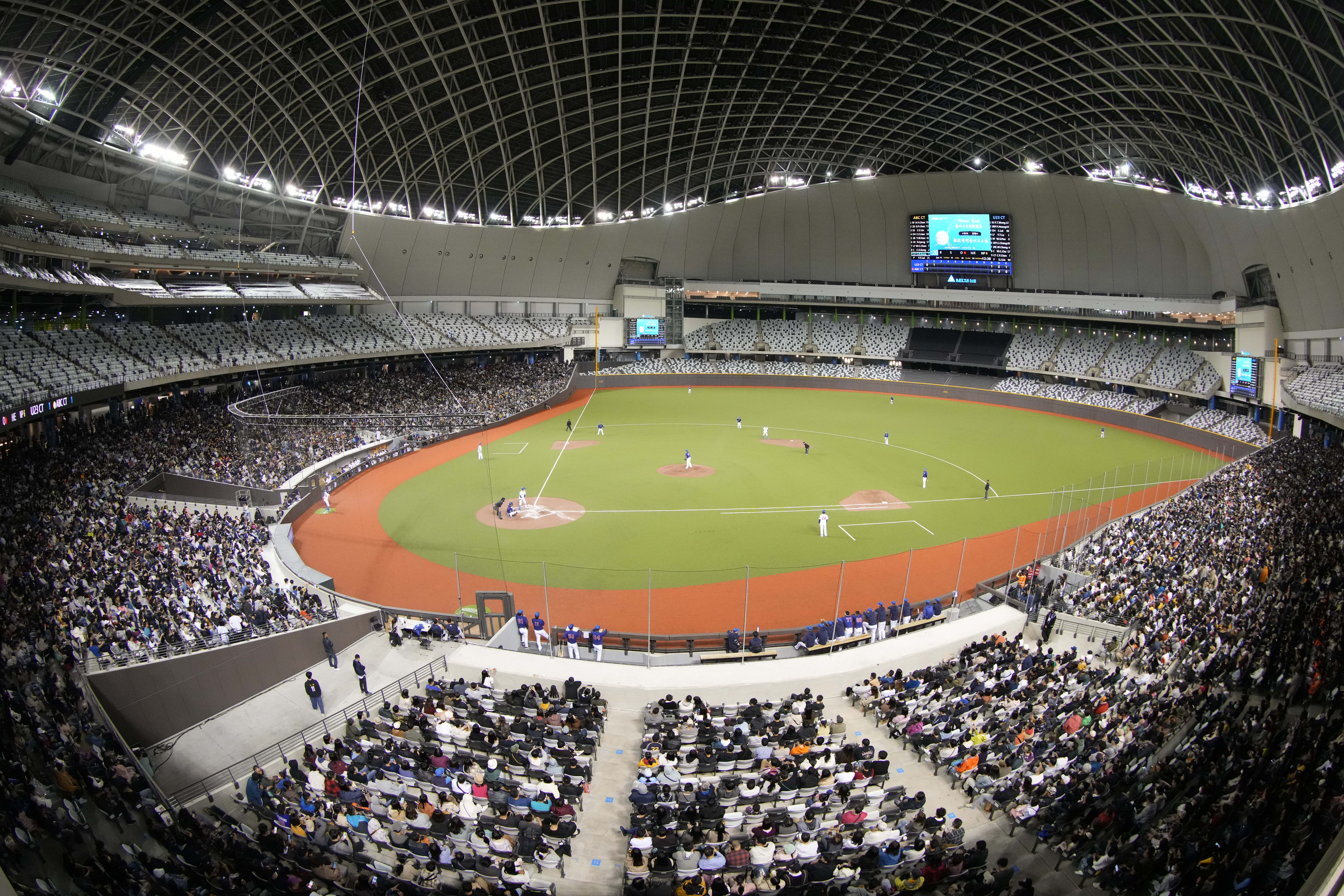
- Taipei Dome in 2023
- Interactive map of Farglory Dome
- Full name: Taipei Cultural and Sports Park Multi-purpose Stadium
- Location: Xinyi, Taipei, Taiwan
- Coordinates: 25°2′32.3″N 121°33′36.3″E
- Elevation: 7.94 ft (2.42 m)
- Owner: Taipei City Government
- Operator: TBD
- Seating type: Soft seat
- Capacity: 40,000 (sporting events); 40,575–59,833 (concerts)
- Type: Stadium
- Events: Sporting events, concerts
- Surface: Artificial turf
- Scoreboard: Yes
- Field size: Left field: 335 ft (102 m); Center field: 400 ft (120 m); Right field: 335 ft (102 m)
- Field shape: Oval
- Public transit: Sun Yat-sen Memorial Hall, Exit 5

Construction
- Groundbreaking: April 2012
- Built: May 20, 2023
- Cost: $37 billion TWD
- Architect: Populous
- Builder: Obayashi Corporation

Website
- www.farglorydome.com.tw

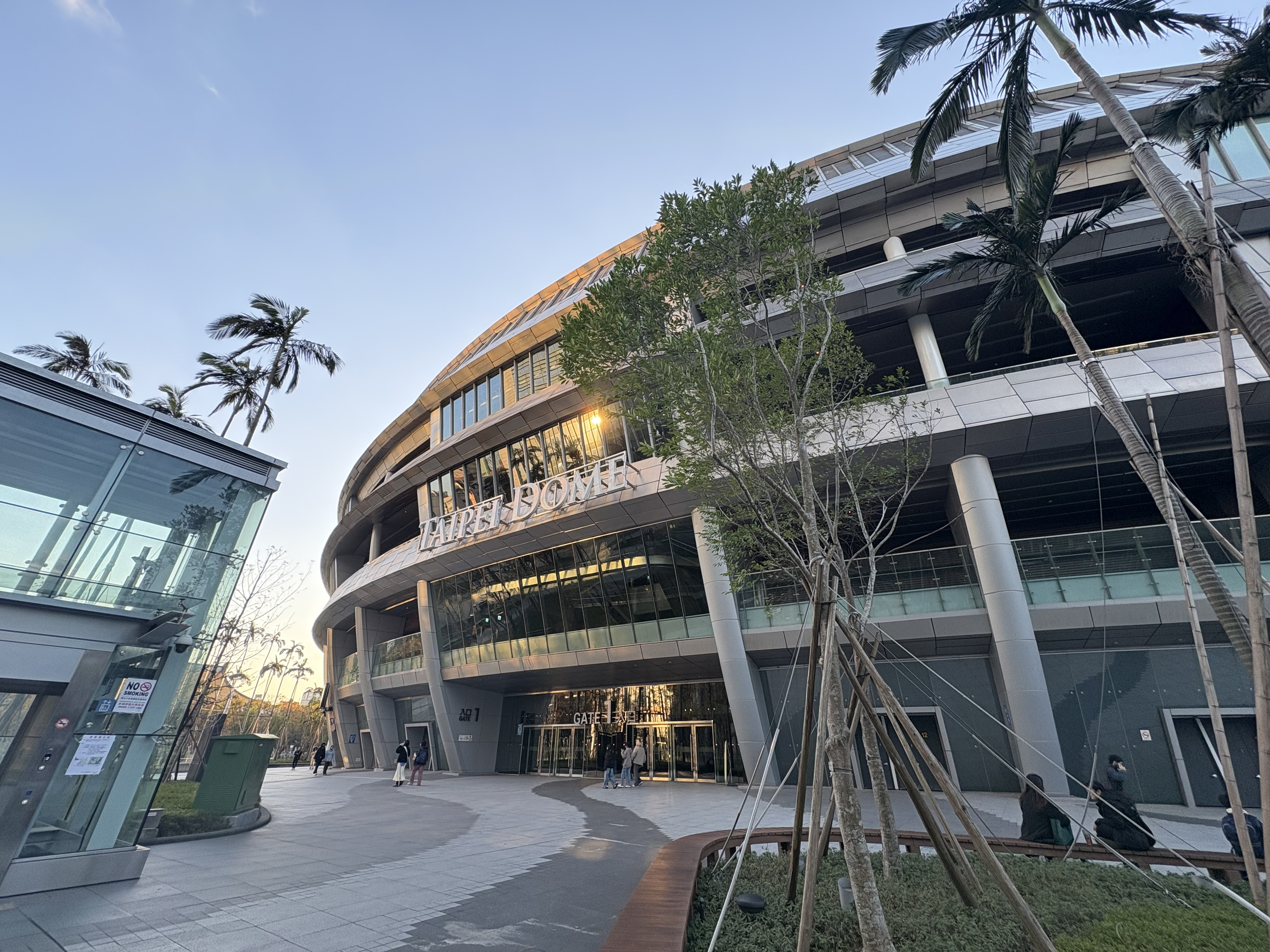
The front exterior of Taipei Dome in 2025

Taipei Dome (Chinese: 臺北大巨蛋; pinyin: Táiběi dà jùdàn; Wade–Giles: T'ai^{²}pei^{³} ta^{⁴} chü^{⁴}tan^{⁴}; lit. 'Taipei big egg'), also known officially as Farglory Dome (遠雄巨蛋), is a multi-purpose domed stadium located in Xinyi, Taipei, Taiwan, that opened in October 2023. It was originally scheduled to start construction in 2007 and be completed in 2011, although the start date had been delayed until October 2011. In addition to the stadium, there will be a complex that will include commercial facilities such as a shopping mall, movie theater, hotel, and office space. Once completed, the stadium should be used mostly for baseball games, but it will also be used for other sporting events such as football, softball, and competitive gaming. It is located at the corner of Zhongxiao East Rd. and Guangfu South Rd, adjacent to Songshan Cultural and Creative Park. Additionally, it was previously planned to be the main stadium of 2017 Taipei Summer Universiade. In May 2015, the Taipei City Government ordered a suspension of construction.

== Overview ==
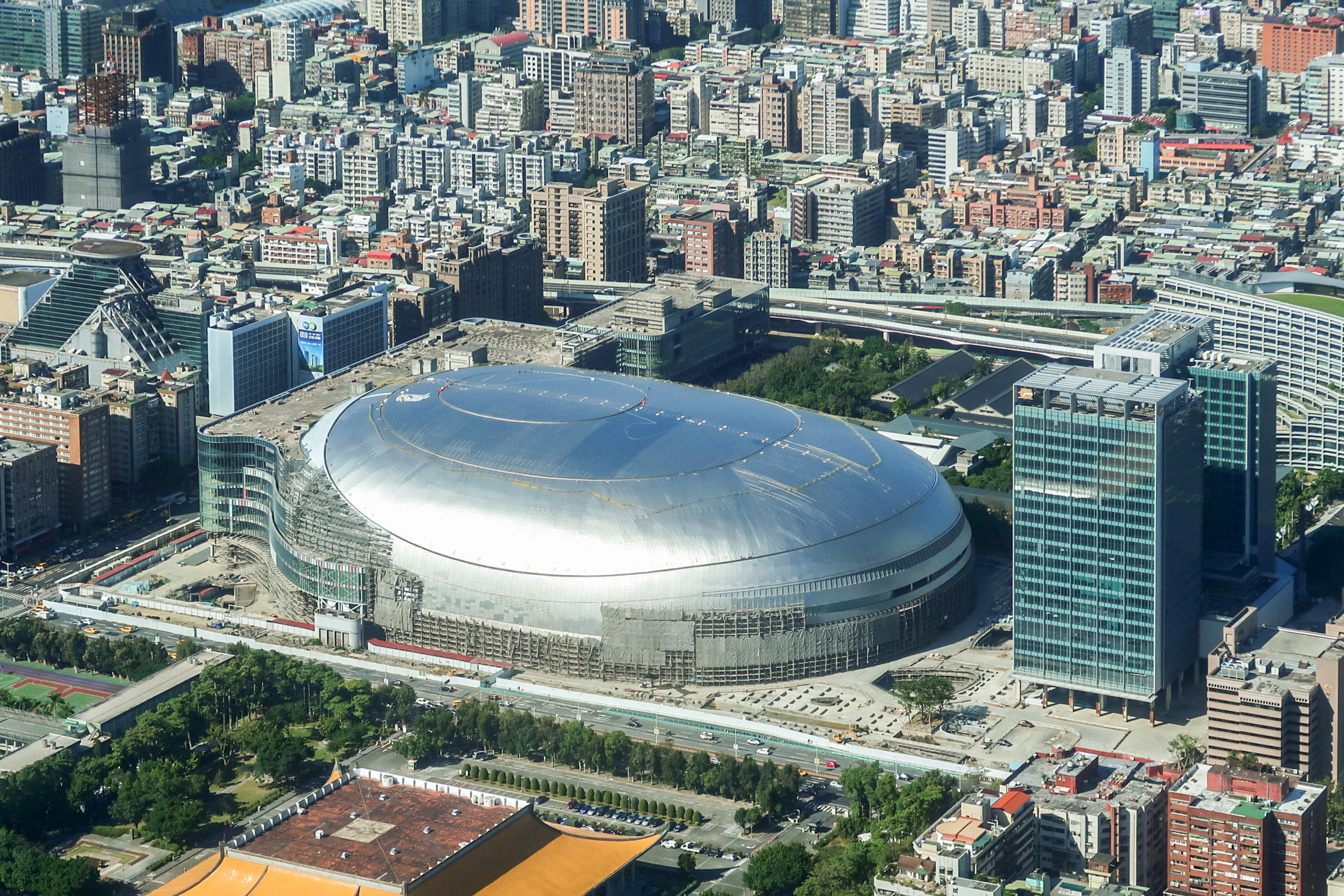
Taipei Dome under construction in 2019

In June 2010, the Taipei City Government rejected a plan for a major expansion of the Taipei Dome stadium project. The plan, which would have added more stores, a movie theater complex, and a hotel, were denied due to traffic concerns in the area. On December 9, 2010, the design for the dome passed the city's urban design review. The proposed design includes a 40,000-seat indoor stadium along with shopping and residential districts. The dome is being built through a contract between the city government and the Farglory Group. Construction was tentatively planned to start in July 2011. By March 2011, however, the environmental assessment review process was delayed until April 2011. The assessment was postponed again in late March 2011 due to insufficient information from the contractor. In May 2011, the Environmental Impact Assessment Review Committee conditionally approved the project after commercial facilities space was decreased by 17.4% to 202,610 m^{2} (2,180,900 ft^{2}). On June 16, 2011, the project received final approval from the Urban Design Review Committee and construction started in October 2011. The dome opened in October 2023.

== Notable events ==
A set of international friendly club baseball games was held on March 2 and 3, 2024. On March 2, 37,890 people watched the CTBC Brothers take on the Yomiuri Giants. Shosei Togo and Yuto Akihiro propelled the Giants to a 4–1 victory. On March 3, 30,890 people watched the Rakuten Monkeys take on the Giants in a game that ended in a scoreless tie.

On March 13, 2024, the New Taipei CTBC DEA announced that their home games on April 13 and 14, 2024 would change to Taipei Dome in Taipei City, and held the 2024 Metro Battle with Taipei Mars. These games would be the first professional basketball games held in Taipei Dome. On April 13, the New Taipei CTBC DEA defeated the Taipei Mars, 88–81, winning the first victory in Taipei Dome with 15,600 people in attendance, the largest crowd in Taiwanese professional basketball history.

After a pair of Chinese Professional Baseball League preseason games at the Taipei Dome, Opening Day of the 2024 CPBL season was held there as well. The Wei Chuan Dragons defeated the Rakuten Monkeys 3–2 with the largest crowd in league history, numbering 28,618 in attendance.

=== Notable past entertainment events ===
The dome is also designed to host major concerts and entertainment shows.

Events involving local artists
Events involving foreign artists

Notable past entertainment events at Taipei Dome
Dates	Artists	Events	Note	Ref.
2024
5, 6, 7, 8 December	Jay Chou	Carnival World Tour	The first artist and male artist to hold a concert at the venue.	
21, 22, 28, 29, 31 December	A-Mei	ASMR World Tour	The first female artist to hold a concert at the venue and the first artist to perform at the venue on New Year's Eve.	
2025
16 March	Taeyeon	The Tense	The first foreign artist to hold a concert at the venue.	
4 April	Andrea Bocelli	Andrea Bocelli Live	The first Western artist to hold a concert at the venue.	
24 & 25 May	JJ Lin	JJ20 Final Lap World Tour	The first Singaporean soloist to hold a concert at this venue	
27, 28 & 29 June, 4, 5 & 6 July, 11-12 July	Mayday	5525 Back to That Day Tour	The first band to hold a concert at this venue	
1 & 2 November	G-Dragon	Übermensch World Tour	The first South Korean male artist to hold a concert at this venue.	
14, 15 & 16 November	Super Junior	Super Show 10	The first foreign group to hold a concert at this venue.	
22 November	More than 60 folk music singers	Folk Song Reunion Concert		
6 December	NCT Dream	The Dream Show 4: Dream the Future		
30 & 31 December	Jolin Tsai	Pleasure World Tour		
2026
1 January	Jolin Tsai	Pleasure World Tour		
1 January	Hosts: Lulu Huang Lu Zi Yin, Chen Han-dian; Singers: Rimi Natsukawa, Accusefive, 911, Crowd Lu, Eric Chou, A-Lin, Jeff Chang	Johnson 50: "Transform The Future Concert" Party		
31 January & 1 February	Tomorrow X Together	Act: Tomorrow		
7 March	I-dle	Syncopation World Tour	The first foreign girlgroup to hold a concert at this venue	
9, 10, 11 & 12 April	G.E.M.	I Am Gloria World Tour	The first Hong Kong soloist to hold a concert at this venue	
25 & 26 April	One Ok Rock	Detox Asia Tour 2026	The first Japanese artist to hold a concert at this venue	
15 & 17 May	Stefanie Sun	Aut Nihilo: Sun Yanzi in Concert	The first Singaporean female soloist to hold a concert at this venue	
3, 4, 5, 8, 12 & 13 July (2 shows on 12th)	Mayday	5525 Back to That Day Tour		
11 August	Aespa	Synk: Complaexity		
9, 10 & 11 October	BigBang	XX: Cosmos World Tour		
31 October	Hosts: Yeh Shu-hua, Wayne Huang; Singers: Hua Chen, Patrick Brasca, SHOU, Minnie, Mamamoo+	Garena A Decade of Valor: 10th Anniversary Concert		

== Transportation ==
Taipei Dome is accessible within walking distance north of Sun Yat-sen Memorial Hall Station of the Taipei Metro.

== See also ==
- List of stadiums in Taiwan
- List of sporting events in Taiwan
- List of Asian stadiums by capacity
- List of ballparks by capacity
- List of covered stadiums by capacity
- Lists of stadiums
