= Sun Will Never Set (song) =

- DNF Apocalypse version cover

Song by Jolin Tsai

from the album Agent J
- Language: Mandarin
- Released: September 21, 2007
- Studio: VIP (Taipei)
- Genre: Pop
- Length: 3:48
- Label: EMI; Mars
- Composers: Alexander Bard; Anders Hansson
- Lyricist: Luke Tsui
- Producer: Michael Lin

Music video
- "Sun Will Never Set" (original version) on YouTube "Sun Will Never Set" (DNF Apocalypse version) on YouTube "Sun Will Never Set" (Mars version) on YouTube

"Sun Will Never Set" (Chinese: 日不落; pinyin: Rì bù luò) is a song by Taiwanese singer Jolin Tsai, featured on her ninth studio album Agent J (2007). The track is adapted from BWO's "Sunshine in the Rain", originally composed by Alexander Bard and Anders Hansson. The lyrics were rewritten by Luke Tsui, with production by Michael Lin.

== Background and release ==
On December 12, 2006, Tsai announced plans to begin preparations for her new album in early 2007. On January 13, 2007, she traveled to London for a three-week vocal and dance training course. On May 22, 2007, she headed to Helsingør, Denmark, for a week-long recording session, with media reporting that the album was expected to be released between August and September. By June 2, 2007, reports indicated that recording had been completed, and Tsai had returned to London for a ten-day dance training program.

On September 21, 2007, she released her ninth studio album Agent J, which included the track "Sun Will Never Set". The music video for the song was directed by Marlboro Lai and featured actor Stephen Fung.

== Commercial performance ==
The song was ranked number one on Taiwan's Hit FM Top 100 Singles of the Year in 2007.

== Other versions ==
On June 5, 2018, Tencent Games announced Tsai as the 10th anniversary ambassador for Dungeon & Fighter (DNF), making her the game's first official ambassador. On June 12, 2018, she released the 10th anniversary theme song "The Player". Later that month, on June 16, she appeared at the DNF 10th Anniversary Party in Shanghai, where she also confirmed her appearance at the upcoming DNF Carnival on November 24. On November 19, she released a special version of "Sun Will Never Set" titled the "DNF Apocalypse Version", performed alongside a hundred video game players. The lyrics and arrangement were adapted by the game's creative team to match the event's theme.

On August 19, 2024, Tsai released the music video for the "Mars Version" of "Sun Will Never Set", created as a promotional track for China Mobile's AI video ringtone service. The video was directed by Curry Tian.

== Accolades ==
On January 14, 2008, the song was awarded Top 10 Mandarin Songs of the Year at the 2007 Canadian Chinese Pop Music Awards. On January 23, the song won Song of the Year at the 2007 Beijing Pop Music Awards. On March 1, 2008, the song was recognized with Most Loved Song by Listeners and Top 10 Mandarin Songs of the Year at the 2008 Hito Music Awards. On October 30, 2008, the song was named one of the Top 20 Most Popular Chinese Songs at the 8th Global Chinese Music Awards.

== Live performances ==
On December 31, 2007, Tsai performed the song at the New Year's Eve Concert in Taichung. On the same day, she also performed the song at the New Year's Eve Concert in Taipei. On January 10, 2008, Tsai appeared on the Southeast TV's variety show Love from the Strait and performed the song. The following day, on January 11, she participated in the M Conference, where she again performed the song. On March 1, 2008, Tsai performed "Sun Will Never Set" at the 2008 Hito Music Awards. On April 28, 2008, she took the stage at the 4th China International Cartoon & Animation Festival Opening Ceremony, where she performed the song once more.

== Track listing ==
Streaming – "Sun Will Never Set" (DNF Apocalypse version)

1. "Sun Will Never Set" (DNF Apocalypse version) – 3:42
2. "Sun Will Never Set" (DNF Apocalypse version instrumental) – 3:42

== Credits and personnel ==
=== Recording ===
- Recorded and mixed at VIP Studio, Taipei

=== Personnel ===
- Michael Lin – guitar, harmony arrangement, recording engineer, mixing engineer
- Jolin Tsai – vocals, harmony

== Release history ==
Region	Date	Format(s)	Version	Distributor
China	November 19, 2018	Streaming	DNF Apocalypse version	Tencent
