= Pleasure (song) =

Single by Jolin Tsai

from the album Pleasure
- Language: English; Mandarin
- Released: May 28, 2025
- Genre: Pop
- Length: 2:48
- Label: Eternal
- Composers: Jolin Tsai; Ross Golan; Richard Craker; Valentina Ploy
- Lyricists: Jolin Tsai; Ross Golan; Richard Craker; Tom Wang
- Producers: Jolin Tsai; Starr Chen; Richard Craker

Jolin Tsai singles chronology
"Oh La La La" (2023)	"Pleasure" (2025)	"DIY" (2025)

Music videos
- "Pleasure" on YouTube

"Pleasure" is a song by Taiwanese singer Jolin Tsai, featured on her fifteenth studio album of the same name, Pleasure (2025). It was written by Tsai, Ross Golan, Richard Craker, Valentina Ploy, and Tom Wang, with production handled by Tsai, Starr Chen, and Richard Craker. It was released on May 28, 2025, by Eternal, as the lead single from Pleasure.

== Background ==
On May 5, 2025, Tsai announced that her new studio album would be released in June, revealing that the title track, "Pleasure", would be released ahead of the album on May 28. On May 16, 2025, she posted nine promotional images from the album on Instagram, accompanied by a 16-second teaser of the single.

== Composition ==
"Pleasure" was co-written by Tsai along with Richard Craker, who had previously worked with her on songs such as "Ugly Beauty" and "Hubby", as well as songwriter Ross Golan and others. Originally conceived as an interlude within the album, the song underwent two years of structural and melodic refinement before it was developed into a complete track.

Musically, the song blends techno and house elements to create a futuristic electronic soundscape. It features driving rhythms and deep synth basslines that evoke a sense of emotional tension between repression and release. Lyrically, the song explores the concept of hedonism, delving into the struggles and coexistence between human desire and morality, the subconscious and conscious mind. It serves as a journey into self-exploration and a redefinition of personal longing.

== Artwork ==
The single's cover art reflects Tsai's internal conflict between desire and guilt. Her finger bears a tattoo that reads "Pleasure", symbolizing temptation, while her tightly gripped braids resemble ropes, signifying the desire to break free from guilt while still being bound by it. The visual presentation portrays the emotional tension and intensity that comes with confronting one's deepest desires.

== Critical reception ==
Professional ratings
Review scores
Source	Rating
Tencent Music	8.48/10

Music site PlayMusic praised the song for its enigmatic and mysterious atmosphere, calling it the beginning of a new creative chapter for Tsai. The review highlighted her whispered vocal delivery and the ritualistic repetition of lyrics, which evoke a sense of subconscious exploration. It also noted that the song continues Tsai's ongoing experimentation with musical styles and artistic expression, reflecting the evolution of her creative journey. Weibo music critic Dai Ruo Mu Yi described the track as a striking showcase of dark aesthetics through its techno-inspired sound, commending its polished production. He noted that the track's ending is handled with impressive layering, while the middle section's house and dance-pop arrangement creates a dynamic contrast between light and darkness.

On July 22, 2025, Tencent Music released its mid-year charts, with "Pleasure" ranking among the top ten best-performing songs of the first half of the year, as well as among the highest-scoring songs on the Wave Chart. Tsai was also named one of the top ten best-performing artists of the year so far. Musician Yuan Wenrui commented that the song continues the stylistic threads that have defined Tsai's work since her debut, while also revealing her artistic growth and newfound perspectives on life and the world. Musician Cheng Huihong described the track as "a declaration from the Queen of Chinese Dance-Pop". Musician Zheng Yijun remarked that Tsai once again demonstrates her versatility and mastery of diverse musical styles in this long-awaited comeback.

== Accolades ==
On December 2, 2025, the music video for "Pleasure" was nominated for Best Music Video at the Asian Pop Music Awards 2025, and ended up winning the category. On May 13, 2026, the 37th Golden Melody Awards announced its nominees, with "Pleasure" receiving nominations for Song of the Year and Best Music Video. On May 23, 2026, "Pleasure" won the Top 10 Chinese Songs of the Year award at the 2026 Hito Music Awards. On June 17, 2026, the music video for "Pleasure" received a nomination for Best Music Video at the 4th Wave Music Awards. On September 6, 2026, "Pleasure" won Production of the Year at the 4th Wave Music Awards.

== Commercial performance ==
Within one hour of its release at midnight on May 28, 2025, "Pleasure" topped the KKBox Taiwan New Song Real-Time Chart. By 10 a.m., it had nearly 100,000 streams on YouTube Music. The track debuted at number one on the Tencent Uni Chart Daily Ranking and also reached number one on KKBox Taiwan Daily Chart, KKBox Singapore Daily Chart, Apple Music Taiwan Hot Songs Chart, and iTunes Taiwan Top Songs Chart. It peaked at number two on both the Billboard Taiwan Songs Chart and the Tencent Uni Chart Weekly Ranking. It was later selected as one of QQ Music's Top 10 Singles of Q2 2025. On September 2, 2025, "Pleasure" earned Platinum Single Certification from Tencent Music, making Tsai the fastest female artist in the platform's history to achieve this recognition.

== Music video ==
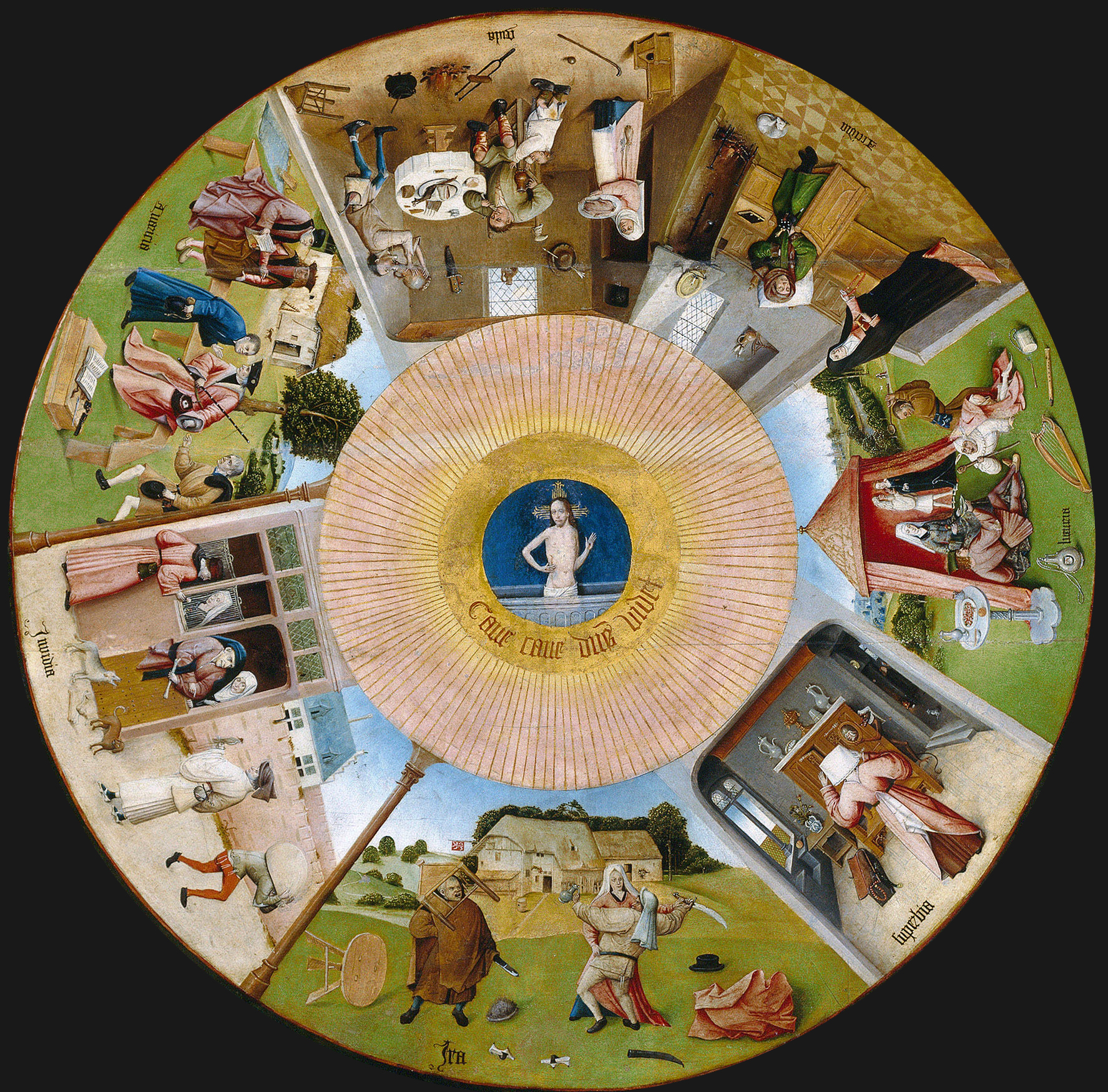
The music video is themed around the seven deadly sins.

On May 30, 2025, Tsai released a 19-second teaser for the "Pleasure" music video. The full video premiered on June 6 at noon. Directed by Christian Breslauer, with choreography by Robbie Blue, the video was filmed at Universal Studios Hollywood, occupying three soundstages to create six distinct sets. The video is conceptually centered on the seven deadly sins, depicting a psychological journey of self-dialogue and human nature. Tsai plays six different characters, combining dance with martial arts elements to portray inner conflict and personal transformation. The post-production process took two months and involved multiple Hollywood visual effects teams, resulting in a visually dramatic and high-impact presentation. On August 19, 2025, a dance version of the music video, directed by Birdy Nio, was released.

== Live performances ==
On June 21, 2025, Tsai gave her debut live performance of "Pleasure" as the closing act at the 2025 Hito Music Awards. On July 25, 2025, she performed the song on the premiere episode of the Jiangsu TV music variety show Hit 2025. On August 24, 2025, she performed at the 6th Tencent Music Entertainment Awards, where she included a segment of her hit "Honey Trap" within the "Pleasure" performance.

== Credits and personnel ==
Credits are adapted from the description of the music video for "Pleasure" on YouTube.

Music

- Jolin Tsai – production, vocal production, backing vocals, backing vocal arrangement
- Starr Chen – production, music arrangement
- Richard Craker – production, music arrangement
- A-Hao – music arrangement
- Morrison Ma – music arrangement
- CYH – music arrangement
- Lin Jie – production assistance
- AJ Chen – vocal recording engineering
- Jon Castelli – mixing
- Dale Becker – mastering

Video

- The Squared Division – creative direction, creative production
- Antidote Digital – creative production
- Andrew Lin – creative coordination
- Tseng Yu-hao – creative coordination
- Christian Breslauer – direction
- London Alley – production
- Jenn Khoe – creative production
- Robbie Blue – choreography
- Andy Hsu – choreography consulting
- Samuel McWilliams – dance
- Thiago Pacheco – dance
- Brandt Czerniski – dance
- Lucas Debaisi – dance
- Chaz Buzan – dance
- Peyton Matthias Albrecht – dance
- Ayden Hammer – dance
- Mario Harris – dance

== Charts ==
=== Weekly charts ===
Chart (2025)	Peak position
China (Tencent)	2
Taiwan (Billboard)	2

== Release history ==
Release dates and formats for "Pleasure"
Region	Date	Format(s)	Distributor
Various	May 28, 2025	Digital download; streaming	Eternal
China	May 28, 2025	Digital download; streaming	YDX
