= Agent J (song) =

Single by Jolin Tsai

from the album Agent J
- Language: Mandarin
- Released: August 29, 2007
- Studio: Mega Force (New Taipei)
- Genre: Pop
- Length: 3:35
- Label: EMI; Mars
- Composer: Ooi Teng Fong
- Lyricists: Sunny Lee; Matthew Yen; Neoh Kim Hin
- Producer: Adia

Jolin Tsai singles chronology
"Dancing Forever" (2006)	"Agent J" (2007)	"In My Arms" (2007)

Music video
- "Agent J" on YouTube

"Agent J" (Chinese: 特務J; pinyin: Tèwù J) is a song by Taiwanese singer Jolin Tsai, released as the lead single from her ninth studio album Agent J (2007) on August 29, 2007, by EMI. The track was written by Ooi Teng Fong, Sunny Lee, Matthew Yen, and Neoh Kim Hin, with production by Adia. The song's success earned the producer Adia the Best Single Producer award, while arranger Andrew Chen received the Best Music Arrangement award at the 19th Golden Melody Awards.

== Background ==
On December 12, 2006, Tsai announced her intention to begin preparations for her next studio album in early 2007. On January 13, 2007, she traveled to London for an intensive three-week training program focusing on vocals and dance. By May 22, 2007, it was confirmed that the album would be released between August and September of that year. On June 2, 2007, Tsai returned to London for an additional ten-day dance course. Filming for the music videos, including one with South Korean actor Kim Jae-won, took place in Paris during the summer of 2007.

== Composition ==
"Agent J" is a rhythm-driven dance-pop track with sleek production and a cinematic flair. The song opens with the distinct sound of high heels striking the ground, which enhances the spy-thriller atmosphere and sets a confident, mysterious tone.

== Music video ==
Directed by Jeff Chang, the music video for "Agent J" premiered on September 3, 2007. In it, Tsai showcases her physical strength and artistry through aerial silk acrobatics and pole dancing. Tsai shared that the physical demands of these performances were challenging, as aerial silks required coordination, while pole dancing demanded strength and control.

== Commercial performance ==
"Agent J" peaked at number 14 on Hit FM Top 100 Singles of the Year in Taiwan for 2007.

== Critical reception ==
DJ Zhu Yun of the Global Chinese Music Chart noted that the song lacked a distinct musical identity, suggesting that Tsai's stylistic transformation was not fully realized. On the other hand, Stephen Lee of Sina Music praised the track for its engaging melody and cinematic arrangement, although he pointed out that its musical style was not particularly innovative. He emphasized Tsai's unique vocal tone and expressive delivery as the song's strengths.

== Awards ==
On December 16, 2007, the music video for "Agent J" won the Best Music Video Performance award at the TVB8 Mandarin Music On Demand Awards. The song also garnered Best Mandarin Song honors at the Metro Radio Mandarin Hits Music Awards. The music video for "Agent J" won the Best Music Video at the 8th Top Chinese Music Awards on April 8, 2008. Additionally, on April 12, 2008, "Agent J" was named one of the Top Hong Kong/Taiwan Songs of the Year at the Music Radio China Top Chart Awards. At the 19th Golden Melody Awards held on July 5, 2008, producer Adia received the Best Single Producer award, and arranger Andrew Chen was awarded Best Music Arrangement for their contributions to the track.

== Live performances ==
Tsai performed "Agent J" at the opening gala of the 16th Golden Rooster and Hundred Flowers Film Festival on October 24, 2007. She performed the song at the Metro Radio Mandarin Hits Music Awards on December 26, 2007, and the Taichung New Year's Eve Concert on December 31, 2007. In early 2008, Tsai performed "Agent J" on Southeast Television's Straits Relations on January 10, 2008, the M Party concert on January 11, 2008, and the 2nd Migu Music Awards on January 13, 2008. She also performed the song at the Beijing Pop Music Awards on January 23, 2008, the Hito Music Awards on March 1, 2008, and the Music Radio China Top Chart Awards on April 7, 2008. On April 8, 2008, Tsai performed "Agent J" during the live broadcast of CCTV's The Same Song: Entering Huizhou.

== Track listing ==
- Taiwanese CD single
1. "Agent J" – 3:35
- Mainland Chinese CD single
1. "Agent J" – 3:35
2. "Bravo Lover" – 3:53

== Personnel ==
- Andrew Chen – guitar
- Adia – background vocal arrangement, background vocals
- Jolin Tsai – background vocals
- AJ Chen – recording engineering
- Mega Force Studio – recording and mixing studio
- Keller Wang – mixing engineering
- SSJ – production assistance

== Release history ==
Release dates and formats for "Agent J"
Region	Date	Format(s)	Distributor
China	August 29, 2007	Radio airplay	Push Typhoon
Taiwan	August 29, 2007	Radio airplay	EMI
