= Mirror Media =

Taiwanese media company

- Type: Multimedia
- Founder: Pei Wei
- Founded: 5 October 2016; 9 years ago
- Website: www.mirrormedia.mg

Mirror Media (Chinese: 鏡週刊) is a Taiwanese media company. It was founded in 2016 as an eponymous tabloid magazine, and also owns the subsidiaries Mirror TV, Mirror News, Mirror Fiction, Mirror Voice (鏡好聽) and MBRAVO (鏡采創意).

== Background ==
Pei Wei was chief editor and publisher of the Taiwanese edition of Next Magazine. During his tenure as editor, Pei was credited with the growth of Next Magazine. A number of articles published in the magazine during his editorship resulted in legal action against Next, as well as Pei personally. A 2002 report on allegations of embezzlement within the National Security Bureau resulted in a raid of company offices. For reports on the personal lives of politicians published within Next Magazine, Pei has been subject to lawsuits alleging libel and defamation. Mirror Media was founded in 2016, with Pei leading a group of former Next Magazine employees. Mirror Media subsequently became the main competitor of Next Magazine.

== Television ==
Mirror TV, a subsidiary of Mirror Media, submitted its first application to the National Communications Commission for a television news channel in December 2019. The application underwent the formal review process starting in January 2021, and was withdrawn for revision in May, before it attained preliminary approval by September. In January 2022, the National Communications Commission formally approved the establishment of the Mirror News channel. Mirror News was the first television news channel to be granted NCC approval since the United Daily News channel began broadcasting in July 2012. Prior to the NCC's formal approval, Mirror News pledged not to air political talk shows during prime-time viewing hours, opting for investigative journalism in that slot. Mirror News also promised to hire retired National Chengchi University journalism professor Weng Shieu-chi as the first full-time ombudsman for any Taiwanese news channel, to devote two hours of airtime broadcasting news in Taiwanese Hokkien, and to emphasize international news, as well as news reports regarding children and teenagers. The NCC's approval was granted alongside the issuance of 26 other conditions, in addition to the goals set by Mirror News as a company. The approval process was noted by outside observers for its length and the presence of required conditions to be met. Prior to its first broadcast, Mirror News went through several changes at executive positions. Mirror News planned to begin broadcasting on Channel 508 of Chunghwa Telecom's multimedia-on-demand system on 2 May, and become publicly accessible on cable channels from 8 May. In March 2024, the Legislative Yuan's Transportation Committee voted to investigate the broadcasting license granted by the National Communications Commission to Mirror News.
