= The Same Song =

The Same Song (Chinese: 同一首歌; pinyin: Tóngyī Shǒu Gē) is the flagship program of the China Central Television music channel. It is usually recorded in a different outside broadcast location each week. The theme song with the same name is usually sung by Mao Amin at the end of the program.
