= J1 =

J1, J01, J.I, J-I or J-1 may refer to:

== Vehicles ==
=== Aircraft ===
- AEG J.I, a World War I German ground attack aircraft
- Albatros J.I, a 1917 German ground-attack single-engine biplane aircraft
- Junkers J 1, a 1916 German aircraft
- Junkers J.I, a 1917 German aircraft
- Lawrance J-1, an early 1920s engine used in American aircraft

=== Locomotives ===
- LB&SCR J1 class, a British LB&SCR locomotive
- LNER Class J1, a class of British steam locomotives
- PRR J1, an American PRR steam locomotive

=== Other vehicles ===
- J-I rocket, a Japanese solid rocket expendable launch vehicle
- J1 type submarine, a World War II Imperial Japanese Navy cruiser submarines class
- HMS J1, a 1915 World War I British submarine
- JAC J1, a subcompact car
- Al Fahd 300 (J-1), an Iraqi surface-to-surface missile project

== In arts and entertainment ==
- J-1 World Heavyweight Championship, a professional wrestling competition
- J1 World Tour, a concert tour by Taiwanese singer Jolin Tsai
- J1 Live Concert, a 2005 live album by Taiwanese singer Jolin Tsai
- "J1" (song), a 2008 song by Mallu Magalhães
- J.I the Prince of N.Y, American rapper also known as J.I.

== In mathematics and science ==
- ATC code J01, Antibacterials for systemic use, a subgroup of the Anatomical Therapeutic Chemical Classification System
- Haplogroup J1 (Y-DNA), a Y-DNA haplogroup
- Janko group J_{1}, in mathematics
- S/2003 J 1, a former name for Eukelade, a satellite of Jupiter
- First-order Bessel function of the first kind, denoted $j_1$
- J01, the ICD-10 code for acute sinusitis, a medical condition
- J_{1}, the Johnson solid notation for an equilateral square pyramid

== Other uses ==
- J-1 visa, a type of U.S. visa for exchange visitors
- The J1 League, the top division of Japanese association football
- Samsung Galaxy J1, a smartphone
- J1, abbreviation, reference to the director staff of the Joint Chiefs of Staff
- Nikon 1 J1, mirrorless interchangeable lens camera

== See also ==
- 1J (disambiguation)
