= Jolin Tsai filmography =

Taiwanese actress filmography

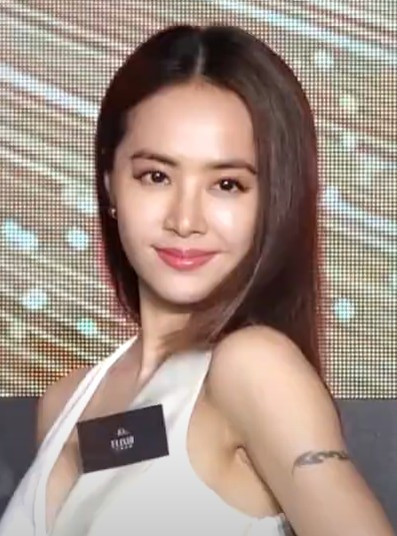
- Tsai in 2023
- Feature films: 2
- Micro films: 5
- Television: 8

Taiwanese artist Jolin Tsai has participated in a total of two feature films, five micro films, and eight television programs. In August 2001, she starred in the Taiwanese variety show Jacky Go Go Go on CTV, in the segment "Love on Sunday" with the drama Catcher, directed by Huang Chun-hua. Later that year, in December 2001, she appeared in the Taiwanese TV series Six Friends on CTS, directed by Ma Kung-wei. In March 2002, she featured in another Taiwanese series, Come to My Place, directed by Doze Niu, also on CTS. In August of the same year, she starred in In Love, a Taiwanese series co-directed by Ouyang Sheng and Chang Chih-chao for CTV. In March 2003, Tsai took on a leading role in the Taiwanese series Hi Working Girl, co-directed by Huang Ko-i and Wu Ssu-ta, which aired on CTS. In May 2005, she starred in the educational segment "We Are the Champions" on the Taiwanese educational program Juguang Garden, directed by Kao Tien-lung.

In September 2007, she played a leading role in the film Agent J, co-directed by Jeff Chang, Kuang Sheng, and Marlboro Lai. In January 2013, she starred in the micro film Take the Happy Home, directed by Wu Jiayang, and subsequently featured in the same micro film series for three consecutive years. In October 2014, she appeared in the microfilm Make a Wish, directed by Shih Hsiang-te. In the same month, she served as a judge on the CCTV variety program Rising Star. In February 2016, Tsai provided the voice for the character Judy Hopps in the Taiwanese dubbed version of the animated film Zootopia, directed by Byron Howard, Rich Moore, and Jared Bush. In January 2019, she also served as a dance mentor on the Chinese variety program Youth With You on iQIYI.

== Feature films ==
Year	Title	Role	Credit(s)	Ref.
2007	Agent J	Agent J	Actress	
2016	Zootopia (Taiwanese Mandarin dubbed version)	Judy Hopps	Actress (voice)	

== Micro films ==
Year	Title	Role	Notes	Ref.
2013	Take the Happy Home 2013	—N/a	Actress	
2014	Take the Happy Home 2014	Cai Xiaoguo	Actress	
2014	Make a Wish	—N/a	Actress	
2015	Take the Happy Home 2015	—N/a	Actress	
2016	Take the Happy Home 2016	—N/a	Actress	

== Television ==
Key
†	Indicates cameo appearance

Year	Title	Role	Episode	Notes	Ref.
2001	Love on Sunday	Lin	"Catcher"	Actress	
2001	Six Friends	Ai †	Episode 11 & 12	Actress	
2002	Come to My Place	Kao An-na †	Episode 4	Actress	
2002	In Love	Jolin †	Episode 10	Actress	
2003	Hi Working Girl	Fu I-ling	All episodes	Actress	
2005	Juguang Garden	Wan Mei-shan	"We Are the Champions"	Actress	
2014	Rising Star	Herself	All episodes	Judge	
2019	Youth with You	Herself	All episodes	Mentor	
