= Born to Be a Star (album) =

2004 greatest hits album by Jolin Tsai

Greatest hits album by Jolin Tsai
- Released: November 12, 2004
- Genre: Pop
- Length: 3:09:15
- Label: Universal; D Sound
- Producer: David Wu; Peter Lee; Paul Lee; Chen Wei; Kay Huang

Jolin Tsai chronology
J9 (2004)	Born to Be a Star (2004)	J-Game (2005)

Born to Be a Star is a greatest hits album by Taiwanese singer Jolin Tsai, released on November 12, 2004, by Universal. The album features 29 songs and 15 music videos from Tsai's discography during her time with Universal.

== Critical reception ==
Tencent Entertainment commented that Magic (2003) and Castle (2004) propelled Tsai to become one of Taiwan's top-selling artists. In response, Universal released a "reheated leftovers" compilation album at the end of 2004, featuring 29 of her earlier tracks. The release also included a DVD containing nearly all the music videos produced during Tsai's time with Universal, reigniting market interest once again.

== Track listing ==
Born to Be a Star – CD 1
No.	Title	Lyrics	Music	Producer(s)	Length
1.	"Don't Stop"	Mao Mao	Rachel Stevens; Hannah Spearritt; Bradley McIntosh; Jon Lee; Paul Cattermole; Jo O'Meara; Tina Barrett; Eliot Kennedy; Mike Percy; Tim Lever	Paul Lee	3:34
2.	"If You Don't Want"	Hsieh Meng-chuan	Low Shao Ying; Chervun Liew	Peter Lee; Paul Lee	4:12
3.	"Blame It on the Age"	Eric Lin	Michael Tu	David Wu	4:44
4.	"Feel Your Presence"	Julian Yu	Chervun Liew	Paul Lee	4:05
5.	"You Gotta Know"	Lu Hsueh-han	Chen Wei	Chen Wei	4:00
6.	"Take It Easy"	Julian Yu; Mao Mao	Chen Chih-yuan	David Wu	3:52
7.	"Guessing"	Daryl Yao	Ronan Keating; Stephen Gately; Shane Lynch; Keith Duffy; Martin Brannigan; Ray Hedges	David Wu	4:15
8.	"By Me"	Hsieh Tien-yao	Hsieh Tien-yao	Kay Huang	4:05
9.	"What Kind of Love"	Jerry Huang	Jimmy Ye	Peter Lee	4:01
10.	"Lucky Number"	Hsieh Meng-chuan	Paul Lee	Paul Lee	4:18
11.	"Out on the Street"	Mao Mao	Jun Young-hun	David Wu	3:49
12.	"The Rose"	Amanda McBroom	Amanda McBroom	David Wu	4:20
13.	"Living with the World"	Chuang Ching-wen	Ronald Ng	Peter Lee; Paul Lee	3:56
14.	"Reluctant"	Hsieh Meng-chuan	Jimmy Ye	David Wu	4:59
Total length:					58:10

Born to Be a Star – CD 2
No.	Title	Lyrics	Music	Producer(s)	Length
1.	"Show Your Love"	Benny Chen	Paul Lee	Paul Lee	4:18
2.	"Sugar Sugar"	Andy Kim	Jeff Barry	David Wu	3:50
3.	"Watch Me Closely"	Julian Yu	Chen Wei	Chen Wei	3:40
4.	"I Know You're Feeling Blue"	Kiki Hu	Jimmy Ye	David Wu	4:24
5.	"Do You Still Love Me"	Kiki Hu	Azlan Abu Hassan	David Wu	4:23
6.	"Words of Loneliness"	Wu Yu-kang	Kuo Heng-chi	David Wu	4:56
7.	"Bridge over Troubled Water"	Paul Simon	Paul Simon	David Wu	4:36
8.	"Fall in Love with a Street"	Hsieh Meng-chuan	Nobuhiro Makino	David Wu	4:24
9.	"Are You Happy"	Kiki Hu	Michael Tu	David Wu	4:36
10.	"Everything's Gonna Be Alright"	Benny Chen	Chervun Liew	Paul Lee	3:52
11.	"Love Song for You"	Chuang Ching-wen	Lee Soo-young	David Wu	3:51
12.	"Because of You"	Julian Yu	Anders Bagge; Arnthor Birgisson; Christian Karlsson; Patrick Tucker	Peter Lee	4:40
13.	"Can't Speak Clearly"	Mao Mao	Jay Chou	Peter Lee	5:05
14.	"Only One of You"	Yao Chien	Azlan Abu Hassan	Peter Lee	4:24
15.	"Good-Bye"	Mao Mao; Joe Lai	Keith Chan	David Wu	4:46
Total length:					65:45

Born to Be a Star – DVD
No.	Title	Length
1.	"You Gotta Know" (music video)	4:00
2.	"Do You Still Love Me" (music video)	4:25
3.	"The Rose" (music video)	5:05
4.	"Lucky Number" (music video)	4:25
5.	"Emptiness" (music video)	3:47
6.	"Show Your Love" (music video)	4:19
7.	"I Know You're Feeling Blue" (music video)	5:10
8.	"Are You Happy" (music video)	4:36
9.	"Fall in Love with a Street" (music video)	4:24
10.	"If You Don't Want" (music video)	4:21
11.	"Don't Stop" (music video)	3:34
12.	"What Kind of Love" (music video)	3:59
13.	"Blame It on the Age" (music video)	4:44
14.	"Sugar Sugar" (music video)	3:50
15.	"Good-Bye" (music video)	4:41
Total length:		65:20

== Release history ==
Region	Date	Format(s)	Distributor
Taiwan	November 12, 2004	2CD+DVD	Universal
China	March 8, 2005	2CD+DVD	Sky
