= J9 (album) =

2004 compilation album by Jolin Tsai

Compilation album by Jolin Tsai
- Released: November 12, 2004
- Genre: Dance; pop
- Length: 50:07
- Label: Sony
- Producer: Jamie Hsueh

Jolin Tsai chronology
Castle (2004)	J9 (2004)	Born to Be a Star (2004)

J9 (an abbreviation of Jolin's Night) is a compilation album by Taiwanese singer Jolin Tsai, released on November 12, 2004, by Sony. The album features two new tracks along with nine remixed songs.

== Background and development ==
On July 8, 2004, Tsai announced that she would launch her first concert tour, the J1 World Tour, on August 7 at Hongkou Football Stadium in Shanghai, China. On October 5, 2004, she revealed that the Taipei stop of the tour would be held on November 20 at Chungshan Soccer Stadium in Taipei. Later, on October 27, 2004, media reported that Tsai would release the compilation album J9 on November 12, 2004.

== Writing ==
"Signature Gesture" conveys the message that girls should embrace confidence and live boldly with their own attitude and individuality. "Single Harm" is a remake of TheThe's "It's You". The album's nine remixed tracks incorporate elements of lounge, techno, and chill-out, offering a diverse and modern sonic experience.

== Title and artwork ==
The album title J9 is an abbreviation for "Jolin's Night", with the number "9" replacing the word "Night"—a stylistic choice commonly seen in Western dance and R&B music. It symbolizes that the songs in the album are perfect for nighttime partying. Additionally, since her concert tour was titled J1, the combination of J1 and J9 equals 10, representing the idea of perfection and completeness.

On the album cover, Tsai wears a handcrafted white lace dress and a fur shawl designed by stylist Roger Cheng, valued at NT$100,000. The look exudes a blend of vintage elegance and sensuality.

== Release and promotion ==
On October 22, 2004, the album officially became available for pre-order. It was released on November 12, 2004, with the record label stating that the compilation would be available only from November 2004 to February 2005 and would not be reissued thereafter. The album includes two new tracks, "Signature Gesture" and "Single Harm", both specially produced to complement the J1 World Tour, along with nine remixed songs.

=== Music videos ===
The music video for "Signature Gesture" was co-directed by Marlboro Lai and Bill Chia. To create a vibrant party atmosphere, the record label invested NT$1 million to construct a nightclub set and runway stage, allowing Tsai to perform energetically amidst a lively crowd. Additionally, NT$50,000 was spent to commission a custom-made pink butterfly outfit designed by a stylist specifically for Tsai.

Tsai personally choreographed half of the dance routine in the video and noted that the choreography differed from her previous girlish styles—it featured larger, more dynamic movements, with a cooler, more distinctive edge and a touch of wild elegance. The music video for "Single Harm" was directed by Jimmy Chou.

=== Live performances ===
On December 17, 2004, Tsai performed "Signature Gesture" at the 2004 TVB8 Mandarin Music On Demand Awards. On December 26, 2004, she performed the same song at the 2004 Metro Radio Hits Music Awards. On January 11, 2005, Tsai participated in the 11th China Music Awards, where she also performed "Signature Gesture". On January 16, 2005, Tsai took part in the 2005 Hito Music Awards, where she performed "Signature Gesture". On January 11, 2006, she performed the song at the 12th China Music Awards.

== Commercial performance ==
The album reached peak positions of number 2 on the weekly sales chart of G-Music, number 3 on Asia Music, and number 6 on Five Music in Taiwan.

Additionally, the song "Signature Gesture" ranked number 61 on Taiwan's Hit FM Top 100 Singles of 2004.

== Critical reception ==
Tencent Entertainment described the album as a "well-promoted dance remix compilation", primarily featuring remixed versions of upbeat tracks from Magic (2003) and Castle (2004). It served as a warm-up release ahead of Tsai's first world tour. While the album itself offered few surprises beyond the two new songs, the rest consisted of remixes of popular fast-paced tracks that were trending in the market at the time. Nonetheless, due to Tsai's soaring popularity and the album's limited-time, limited-edition release, it still attracted strong demand from fans.

== Accolades ==
On September 3, 2005, the track "Signature Gesture" won the Top 25 Songs award at the 5th Global Chinese Music Award.

== Track listing ==
No.	Title	Lyrics	Music	Producer(s)	Length
1.	"Signature Gesture" (招牌動作)	Issac Chen	Edward Chan; Charles Lee	Jamie Hsueh	3:12
2.	"Single Harm" (單身公害)	Francis Lee	Kang Hyun-min	Jamie Hsueh	3:44
3.	"Magic" (remix)	Issac Chen	Edward Chan; Charles Lee		4:42
4.	"Nice Cat" (remix)	Issac Chen	Anna Lidner; Charles Kwashie Tamakloe		4:00
5.	"Say Love You" (remix)	Simon Liang	Jay Chou		4:12
6.	"36 Tricks of Love" (remix)	Kiki Hu	Savan Kotecha; Andrew Frampton; Wayne Wilkins		5:01
7.	"Pirates" (remix)	Issac Chen	Jay Chou		4:24
8.	"It's Love" (remix)	Simon Liang	Jay Chou		4:39
9.	"Love Love Love" (remix)	Simon Liang	Konstantin Meladze		4:36
10.	"Smell of the Popcorn" (remix)	Vincent Fang	Wan Chiu		3:50
11.	"J9 Magic Non-Stop remix" (36 Tricks of Love / Nice Cat / Love Love Love / Magic)	Kiki Hu; Issac Chen; Simon Liang	Savan Kotecha; Andrew Frampton; Wayne Wilkins; Anna Lidner; Charles Kwashie Tamakloe; Konstantin Meladze; Edward Chan; Charles Lee		7:47
Total length:					50:07

== Release history ==
Region	Date	Format(s)	Edition	Distributor
China	November 12, 2004	CD; cassette	Standard	Epic
China	November 12, 2004	CD	Limited	Epic
Malaysia	November 12, 2004	CD	Standard	Sony
Taiwan	November 12, 2004	CD	Standard	Sony
