= Born to Be a Star =

Born to Be a Star may refer to:

- Born to Be a Star (TV series), a singing talent-reality competition
- Born to Be a Star (album), a 2004 album by Jolin Tsai
- Bucky Larson: Born to Be a Star, a 2011 American comedy film
