= Jolin Tsai =

Taiwanese singer, songwriter, and actress (born 1980)

- 蔡依林
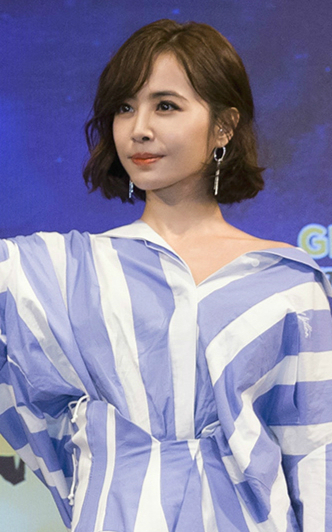
- Tsai in 2018
- Born: Tsai I-ling; September 15, 1980 (age 46); Hsinchuang, Taipei County, Taiwan
- Other name: Jolin Cai
- Education: Fu Jen Catholic University
- Occupations: Singer; songwriter; record producer; actress; author; businesswoman
- Years active: 1999–present
- Works: Albums; singles; songs; concerts; videos; films
- Awards: Full list
- Musical career
- Origin: Taipei, Taiwan
- Genres: Pop; dance
- Instrument: Vocals
- Labels: Universal; Sony; EMI; Gold Typhoon; Warner; Eternal
- Website: jolincai.com

Chinese name

Birth name
- Chinese: 蔡宜凌
Transcriptions
Standard Mandarin
- Hanyu Pinyin: Cài Yīlíng
- Wade–Giles: Ts'ai^{4} I^{2}-ling^{2}
Southern Min
- Hokkien POJ: Chhoà Gî-lêng

Legal name
- Chinese: 蔡依翎
Transcriptions
Standard Mandarin
- Hanyu Pinyin: Cài Yīlíng
- Wade–Giles: Ts'ai^{4} I^{1}-ling^{2}
Southern Min
- Hokkien POJ: Chhoà I-lêng

Stage name
- Chinese: 蔡依林
Transcriptions
Standard Mandarin
- Hanyu Pinyin: Cài Yīlín
- Wade–Giles: Ts'ai^{4} I^{1}-lin^{2}
Southern Min
- Hokkien POJ: Chhoà I-lîm

Tsai I-ling (Chinese: 蔡依翎; born September 15, 1980), known professionally as Jolin Tsai or simply Jolin (Chinese: 蔡依林), is a Taiwanese singer, songwriter, record producer, and actress. Referred to as the "Queen of C-Pop", she is one of the most influential figures in Chinese-language popular culture. Known for her continual reinvention of musical styles, visual presentation, and performance, Tsai has played a significant role in the development of contemporary Mandopop, particularly through her popularization of dance-pop in the Chinese-speaking world. She exercises substantial creative control over her career, and her work has frequently explored themes of identity, gender, sexuality, self-expression, and contemporary social issues, while achieving both commercial success and critical acclaim.

Born in Hsinchuang, Taiwan, Tsai rose to prominence in 1998 after winning a singing competition organized by MTV Mandarin. She made her recording debut with 1019 in 1999, establishing herself as a leading teen idol. With Magic (2003), she underwent a significant artistic transition toward dance-pop, a direction she further developed with Dancing Diva (2006). The latter earned her first Golden Melody Award and established her as a prominent figure in Chinese-language dance-pop. She subsequently received widespread critical and award recognition for albums including Muse (2012), Play (2014), Ugly Beauty (2018), and Pleasure (2025). With nine Golden Melody Awards, she is the most awarded female Mandopop artist in the history of the awards.

With more than 25 million records sold, Tsai is the highest-selling Taiwanese female recording artist since 2000. Since the release of Magic in 2003, each of her studio albums has been the best-selling album by a female artist in Taiwan in its respective year of release, with four also becoming the country's best-selling album overall. She has also been a frequent presence on the Forbes China Celebrity 100 list, ranking among its top 20 figures in six of the ten years for which rankings were reported between 2010 and 2019, and was named the highest-ranked Chinese female singer on three occasions. Her net worth was reported to have exceeded NT$2 billion in 2014, while published rankings placed her as Taiwan's highest-paid female singer 16 times between 2003 and 2022.

== Life and career ==
=== 1980–1998: Early life ===
Tsai was born on September 15, 1980, in Hsinchuang City, Taipei County, Taiwan (now Xinzhuang District, New Taipei City). She has an older sister. Her maternal grandmother was a member of the Papora, an Indigenous Taiwanese tribe, giving Tsai one-quarter Papora heritage.

She attended Hsinchuang Elementary School, followed by Hsinchuang Junior High School and Chingmei Girls' High School. During high school, she formed a band called Twister with her classmates and actively participated in various singing competitions. They won the Chingmei Girls' High School Singing Competition and second place in the popular music category of the BCC National High School Singing Competition.

In May 1998, Tsai entered a singing competition co-organized by MTV Mandarin and Sony to fulfill the extracurricular activity requirements for her university applications. On August 11, 1998, she won the singing category of the competition. In March 1999, she signed with Universal and was named the label's key new artist of the year. The company arranged six months of training for her, including dance, makeup, and language lessons, as well as trips to Ireland and the United States to observe live performances by international artists. In June 1999, she was admitted to the English Literature major at Fu Jen Catholic University, ranking first in the university recommendation screening process.

=== 1999–2002: 1019, Don't Stop, Show Your Love, and Lucky Number ===
On July 16, 1999, Tsai released her debut single, "Living with the World". Later that year, on September 10, she released her debut studio album, 1019, produced by David Wu, Peter Lee, and Paul Lee. The album blended elements of pop, hip-hop, R&B, and world music, and sold over 400,000 copies in Taiwan.

On April 26, 2000, she released her second studio album, Don't Stop, produced by David Wu, Paul Lee, Peter Lee, and Chen Wei. Incorporating pop, hip-hop, rock, reggae, and R&B, the album sold over 500,000 copies in Taiwan, ranking as the sixth best-selling album of the year and the second best-selling by a female artist. It remains her highest-selling album in Taiwan to date. On May 5, 2000, she released a photobook titled Nineteen Years, which sold over 60,000 copies in Taiwan.

On December 22, 2000, she released her third studio album, Show Your Love, produced by David Wu, Paul Lee, Peter Lee, Chen Wei, and Jae Chong. The album sold over 260,000 copies in Taiwan. On September 6, 2001, the music video for her song "Fall in Love with a Street" won the International Viewers' Choice award at the 2001 MTV Video Music Awards.

On June 28, 2001, she performed the Mandarin version of the theme song "Where the Dream Takes You" for the 2001 film Atlantis: The Lost Empire. On July 7, 2001, she released her fourth studio album, Lucky Number, produced by David Wu, Peter Lee, Paul Lee, Chen Wei, and Kay Huang. The album blended pop, R&B, disco, and hip-hop influences. However, due to a contract dispute with her management company D Sound, promotional efforts were limited. Despite this, the album sold over 150,000 copies in Taiwan and ranked among the top 20 best-selling albums of 2001. On February 18, 2002, Tsai represented Mandopop on the cover of BusinessWeek, appearing alongside MTV's Chairman and CEO William Roedy and Russian duo t.A.T.u.

=== 2002–2005: Magic, Castle, and J-Game ===
On July 23, 2002, Tsai signed with Sony. On August 2, 2002, she released her book The Masque of the Princess & the Spirit of Knight, which sold over 50,000 copies in Taiwan. On March 7, 2003, she released her fifth studio album, Magic, produced by Bing Wang, Peter Lee, Jay Chou, Jamie Hsueh, and Huang Yi. The album fused pop, disco, funk, ballad, hip-hop, and British rock elements. It sold over 360,000 copies in Taiwan and 1.5 million copies across Asia, becoming the second best-selling album of the year in Taiwan and the highest-selling album by a female artist. It was nominated for Album of the Year at the 15th Golden Melody Awards, while Tsai was nominated for Best Mandarin Female Singer, and Baby Chung won Best Music Arrangement for the song "Prague Square".

On March 9, 2003, the television series Hi Working Girl, starring Tsai, premiered on CTV. On April 10, 2003, she performed the theme song "Angel of Love" and the interlude songs "Darkness" and "Sweetie" for the 2003 film Why Me, Sweetie?!. On June 14, 2003, she graduated from Fu Jen Catholic University with a bachelor's degree in English Literature. On September 10, 2003, she recorded the theme song "Warriors in Peace" for the 2003 film Warriors of Heaven and Earth. On September 15, 2003, she translated Madonna's children's book The English Roses into Chinese, later also translating five other books by Madonna.

On February 27, 2004, Tsai released her sixth studio album, Castle, produced by Bing Wang, Peter Lee, Jay Chou, Jamie Hsueh, Huang Yi, and G-Power. The album combined elements of pop, hip-hop, Latin, chanson, heavy metal, and British rock. It sold over 300,000 copies in Taiwan and 1.5 million copies across Asia, becoming the second best-selling album of the year in Taiwan and the highest-selling album by a female artist.

On August 7, 2004, Tsai launched her first concert tour, the J1 World Tour, with a debut performance at the Hongkou Football Stadium in Shanghai. The tour lasted one year and nine months, covering seven cities worldwide in eight shows. On November 12, 2004, she released the compilation album J9. On February 8, 2005, she appeared on CCTV New Year's Gala, performing "36 Tricks of Love". On March 9, 2005, she published her book Jolin's English Diary Book, which sold over 120,000 copies in Taiwan.

On April 25, 2005, she released her seventh studio album, J-Game, produced by Jamie Hsueh, Jack Chou, Bing Wang, and Adia. The album incorporated pop, hip-hop, electronic, disco, and Chinese traditional elements. It sold over 260,000 copies in Taiwan and 1.2 million copies in Asia, becoming the second best-selling album of the year in Taiwan and the highest-selling album by a female artist. On September 23, 2005, she released the live video album J1 Live Concert. On September 28, 2005, Show Lo released the duet "Destined Guy" featuring Tsai. On December 30, 2005, she published the book Jolin's Party, which sold over 150,000 copies in Taiwan.

=== 2006–2008: Dancing Diva and Agent J ===
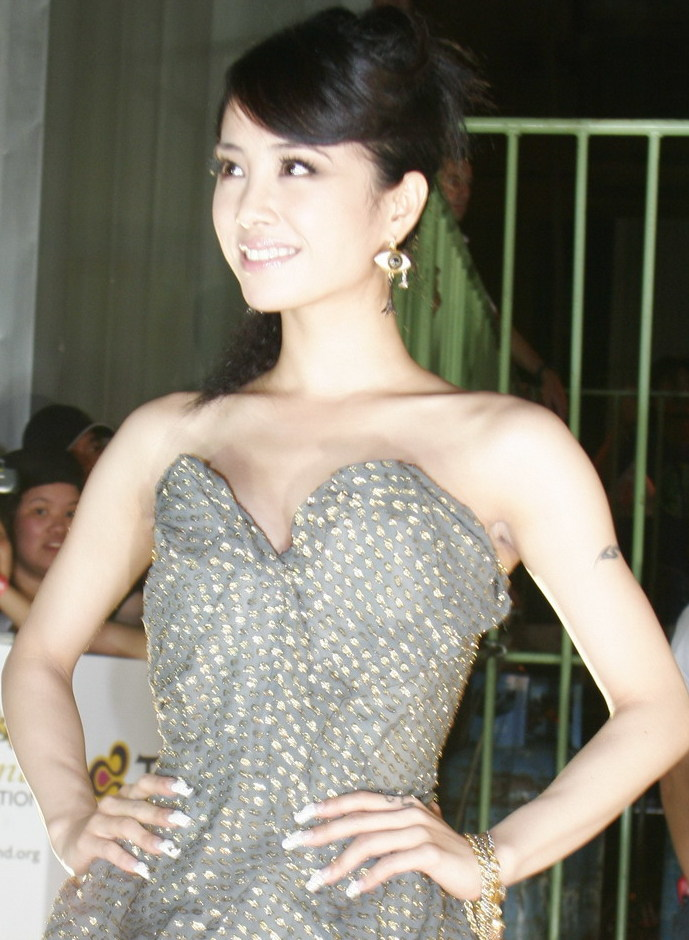
Tsai at MTV Asia Awards 2006

On February 16, 2006, Tsai signed with EMI. On May 5, 2006, Sony released her greatest hits compilation J-Top, which sold over 100,000 copies in Taiwan and became the fifth best-selling album of the year. On May 12, 2006, she released her eighth studio album, Dancing Diva, produced by Adia, Peter Lee, Paul Lee, Paula Ma, Yuri Chan, and Stanley Huang. The album was based on pop and electronic music. It sold over 300,000 copies in Taiwan and over 2.5 million copies across Asia, becoming the top-selling album of 2006 in Taiwan. The album was nominated for Best Mandarin Album at the 18th Golden Melody Awards, and Tsai won Best Mandarin Female Singer and Favorite Female Singer/Group, while Adia was nominated for Best Single Producer for the song "Dancing Diva".

On September 15, 2006, she launched her second concert tour, the Dancing Forever World Tour, with its first show held at the Hong Kong Coliseum. The tour lasted two and a half years, visiting 20 cities worldwide with a total of 28 shows, drawing approximately 500,000 attendees and earning around NT$1 billion at the box office. On September 29, 2006, she released the compilation Dancing Forever, which included the song "Marry Me Today", winner of Song of the Year at the 18th Golden Melody Awards. On February 17, 2007, Tsai performed "Marry Me Today" with David Tao on CCTV New Year's Gala. On June 8, 2007, she released her live video album and documentary If You Think You Can, You Can!, which sold over 120,000 copies in Taiwan.

On September 21, 2007, Tsai released her ninth studio album, Agent J, with producers including Lars Quang, Nik Quang, RnG, Adia, Peter Lee, Michael Lin, Paula Ma, and Jamie Hsueh. The album was released alongside the film of the same name, directed by Jeff Chang, Marlboro Lai, and Kuang Sheng, and starring Kim Jae-won, Stephen Fung, and Carl Ng. The album sold over 200,000 copies in Taiwan and over 3 million copies across Asia, becoming the highest-selling album of 2007 in Taiwan. Adia won Best Single Producer for the song "Agent J", and Andrew Chen won Best Music Arrangement at the 19th Golden Melody Awards.

On November 21, 2007, Kylie Minogue released the single "In My Arms" featuring Tsai. On October 31, 2008, Tsai released her cover album Love Exercise, along with the book of the same name. The album contained ten English-language covers, produced by Paula Ma, Peter Lee, Jim Lee, Daniel Bi, Paul Lee, and Adia. Originally scheduled for release on March 7, 2008, the album was delayed due to EMI's internal restructuring and ownership changes. It sold over 30,000 copies in Taiwan and became the best-selling Western-language album of the year.

=== 2008–2018: Butterfly, Myself, Muse, and Play ===
On December 16, 2008, Tsai signed a contract with Warner. On March 27, 2009, she released her tenth studio album, Butterfly. The album was produced by Adia, Paul Lee, Peter Lee, and Paula Ma. In Taiwan, pre-orders exceeded 120,000 copies, setting a new record for the highest pre-order volume in Taiwan. Ultimately, the album sold over 130,000 copies domestically and more than one million copies across Asia, becoming Taiwan's best-selling album of 2009. On March 28, 2009, Tsai launched the Butterfly Campus Tour at Chung Hua University, initially planned for 10 shows. However, due to a recurrence of an old injury, only four performances were completed before the remaining dates were cancelled. On October 9, 2009, she released the live video album Love & Live. On October 15, 2009, she and Ke Fu-hung co-founded the company Eternal, which focus on artist management, music production, copyright management, and concert production, marking the beginning of her significant creative control over all aspects of her career. On April 27, 2010, she performed the theme song "Heartbeat of Taiwan" for the Taiwan Pavilion at the Expo 2010.

On August 13, 2010, Tsai released her eleventh studio album, Myself. Produced by Andrew Chen, Adia, and Paula Ma, the album centered on a party theme, with 90% of the tracks being dance songs. Sales in Taiwan exceeded 65,000 copies, becoming the fourth best-selling album of the year in Taiwan and the top-selling album by a female artist. The music video for the song "Honey Trap" was nominated for Best Music Video at the 22nd Golden Melody Awards. On December 24, 2010, Tsai began her third concert tour, the Myself World Tour, at the Taipei Arena. Spanning two years and four months, the tour covered 35 shows across 31 cities worldwide, attracting approximately 600,000 attendees and generating around NT$1.5 billion in ticket sales. On July 12, 2011, she published the book Living Slim, which sold over 120,000 copies in Taiwan.

On September 14, 2012, Tsai released her twelfth studio album, Muse. The album was produced by Michael Lin, Peggy Hsu, JJ Lin, and Tanya Chua. It blended pop music with pop art, incorporating both mainstream and independent music styles. With sales exceeding 95,000 copies in Taiwan, the album ranked third in annual sales and first among female artists in 2012. It was nominated for Best Mandarin Album at the 24th Golden Melody Awards. The track "The Great Artist" and its music video were nominated for Song of the Year and Best Music Video, respectively, while Tsai was also nominated for Best Mandarin Female Singer. Ultimately, "The Great Artist" won Song of the Year.

On January 16, 2013, Tsai represented Taiwan at the Midem held in Cannes, France. On October 19, 2013, she released the live video album Myself World Tour. On May 19, 2014, she performed "Now Is the Time" for the 2014 FIFA World Cup, featured on the globally released compilation album Pepsi Beats of the Beautiful Game. On June 13, 2013, she sang the theme song "Kaleidoscope" for the 2013 film Tiny Times 3. On August 27, 2013, she performed the theme song "Be Wonderful Together" for Pepsi and Tmall's campaign. Beginning October 31, 2013, she served as a judge on the CCTV's variety show Rising Star, which concluded on December 30 of the same year.

On November 15, 2014, Tsai released her thirteenth studio album, Play. Produced by Starr Chen, Andrew Chen, Tiger Chung, JJ Lin, and Michael Lin, the album sold over 85,000 copies in Taiwan. It ranked fourth in Taiwan's annual sales and first among female artists in 2014. The album garnered ten nominations at the Golden Melody Awards, making it one of the most nominated albums in history. It ultimately won Best Mandarin Album and Best Vocal Recording Album, while Andrew Chen earned Best Single Producer for the track "Lip Reading". On May 22, 2015, Tsai commenced her fourth concert tour, the Play World Tour, at the Taipei Arena. Lasting approximately one year and two months, the tour held 34 shows across 23 cities worldwide, attracting around 600,000 attendees and generating approximately NT$1.5 billion in ticket revenue. On December 2, 2015, she received the Best Asian Artist Mandarin award at the 2015 Mnet Asian Music Awards.

On February 26, 2016, Tsai voiced the character Judy Hopps in the Taiwanese dubbed version of the 2016 film Zootopia. On September 30, 2016, Alesso released the single "I Wanna Know" with Tsai. On October 31, 2016, Starr Chen released the single "Ego-Holic" featuring Tsai. On May 12, 2017, Tsai performed the theme song "Give Love" for Da Ai Television's Mother's Day campaign. On June 20, 2017, Hardwell released the single "We Are One" with Tsai. On November 20, Tsai sang the theme song "On Happiness Road" for the film of the same name. On December 29, 2017, she performed the theme song "Stand Up" for the 2018 film Monster Hunt 2. On January 30, 2018, Tsai released the live video album Play World Tour. On June 12, 2018, she sang the 10th anniversary theme song "The Player" for the video game Dungeon & Fighter.

=== 2018–present: Ugly Beauty and Pleasure ===
On December 26, 2018, Tsai released her fourteenth studio album, Ugly Beauty. The album was produced by Starr Chen, Razor Chiang, Howe Chen, Øzi, and Tsai herself, blending elements of pop, reggae, electronic, and hip-hop. The album achieved the highest annual album sales in Taiwan for 2019. As of April 2025, its digital sales in mainland China exceeded 950,000 copies, setting the record for the highest digital sales among female artists from Hong Kong, Macau, or Taiwan. The album received eight nominations at the Golden Melody Awards, ultimately winning Album of the Year, while the song "Womxnly" was honored Song of the Year. Beginning January 21, 2019, Tsai served as a dance mentor for the first season of iQIYI's variety show Youth With You, which concluded on April 6, 2019. On January 24, 2019, she collaborated with Liu Yuning and TikTok influencers to release the New Year-themed single "Happy New Year Do Re Mi" for TikTok. On November 1, 2019, she teamed up with Karry Wang to release the single "Gravity". On December 30, 2019, Tsai kicked off her fifth concert tour, the Ugly Beauty World Tour, at the Taipei Arena. The tour spanned approximately four years and seven months, comprising 63 shows in 27 cities.

On April 3, 2020, Tsai and Eason Chan released the single "Fight as One". On November 22, 2020, she performed the opening theme "Who Am I", the ending theme "Turn Back Time", and the interlude song "Opposite" for the 2020 television series The Wolf. On March 21, 2021, she collaborated with R3hab on the single "Stars Align". Later that year, on October 21, she teamed up with Steve Aoki and Max Schneider to release "Equal in the Darkness". On December 9, 2022, she performed the theme song "Untitled" for the 2023 film Marry My Dead Body, which was nominated for Best Original Film Song at the 60th Golden Horse Awards. On October 31, 2023, Tsai sang the theme song "Someday, Somewhere" for the 2023 web series At the Moment. She and Richard Craker were nominated for Best Composer at the 35th Golden Melody Awards for their work on the song. On November 20, 2023, she performed "Oh La La La", the theme song celebrating the 40th anniversary of McDonald's Taiwan.

On July 25, 2025, Tsai released her fifteenth studio album, Pleasure. The album was produced by Tsai herself, Starr Chen, Richard Craker, Nick Lee, Ross Golan, Ojivolta, Jenna Andrews, and Stephen Eric Kirk. The album became the highest-selling album by a female artist in Taiwan for 2025. As of December 2025, the album's digital sales in China exceeded 220,000 copies, earning it the fifth-highest digital album sales in China for 2025 and the highest digital album sales among C-pop female artists. The album received the most nominations at the 37th Golden Melody Awards, totaling nine nominations, ultimately winning Album of the Year and Best Vocal Recording Album, while Tsai won Best Mandarin Female Singer. On October 31, 2025, Tsai announced that she would kick off her sixth concert tour, the Pleasure World Tour, at the Taipei Dome on December 30, 2025. On February 25, 2026, Tsai released "Prague Square (Jolin Version)", which serves as the theme song in commemoration of the inauguration of Starlux Airlines' Taipei–Prague route. On March 27, 2026, Filipino boy group SB19 released their album Wakas at Simula, featuring the song "Emoji" in collaboration with Tsai.

== Artistry ==
=== Influences ===
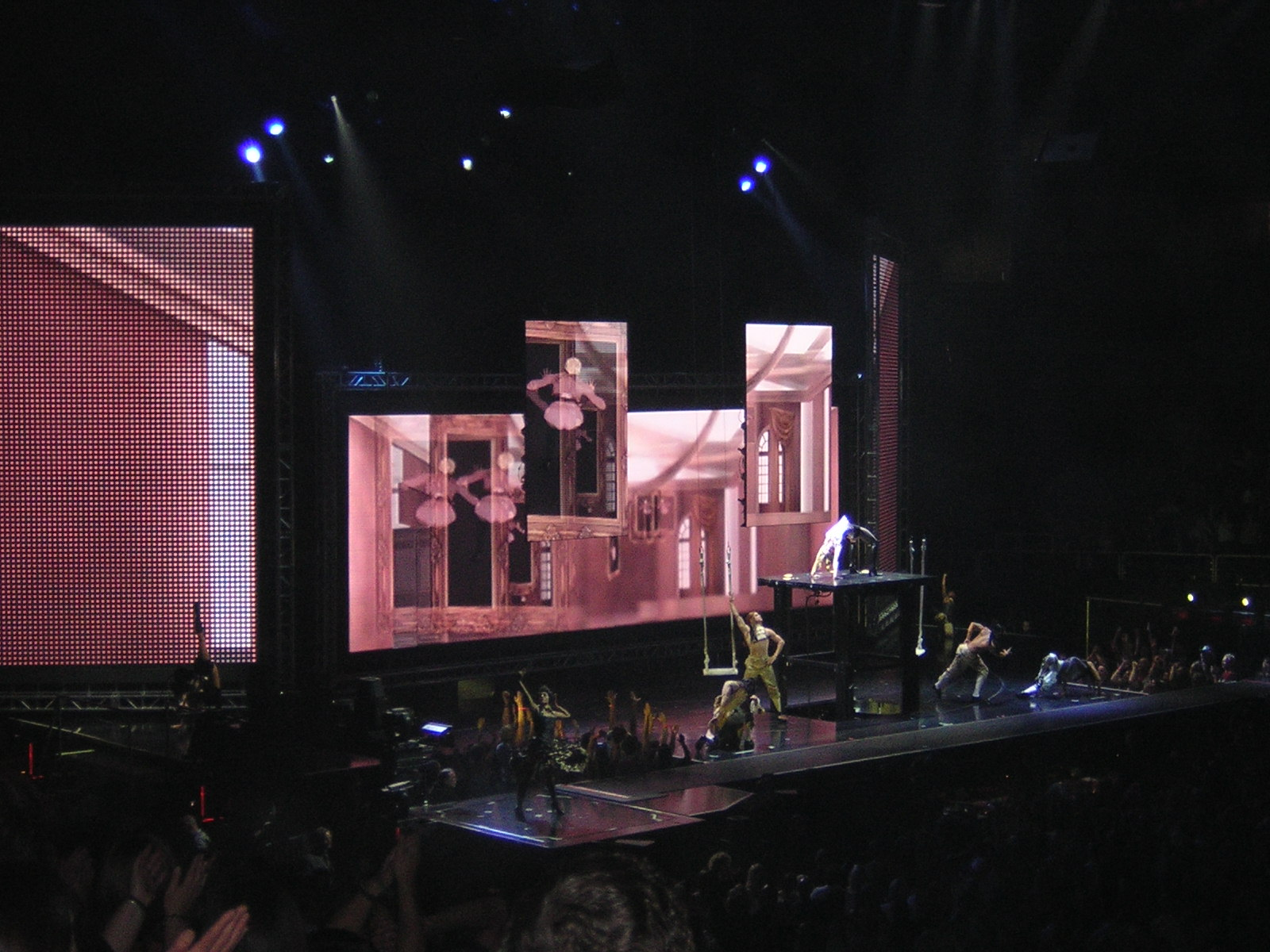
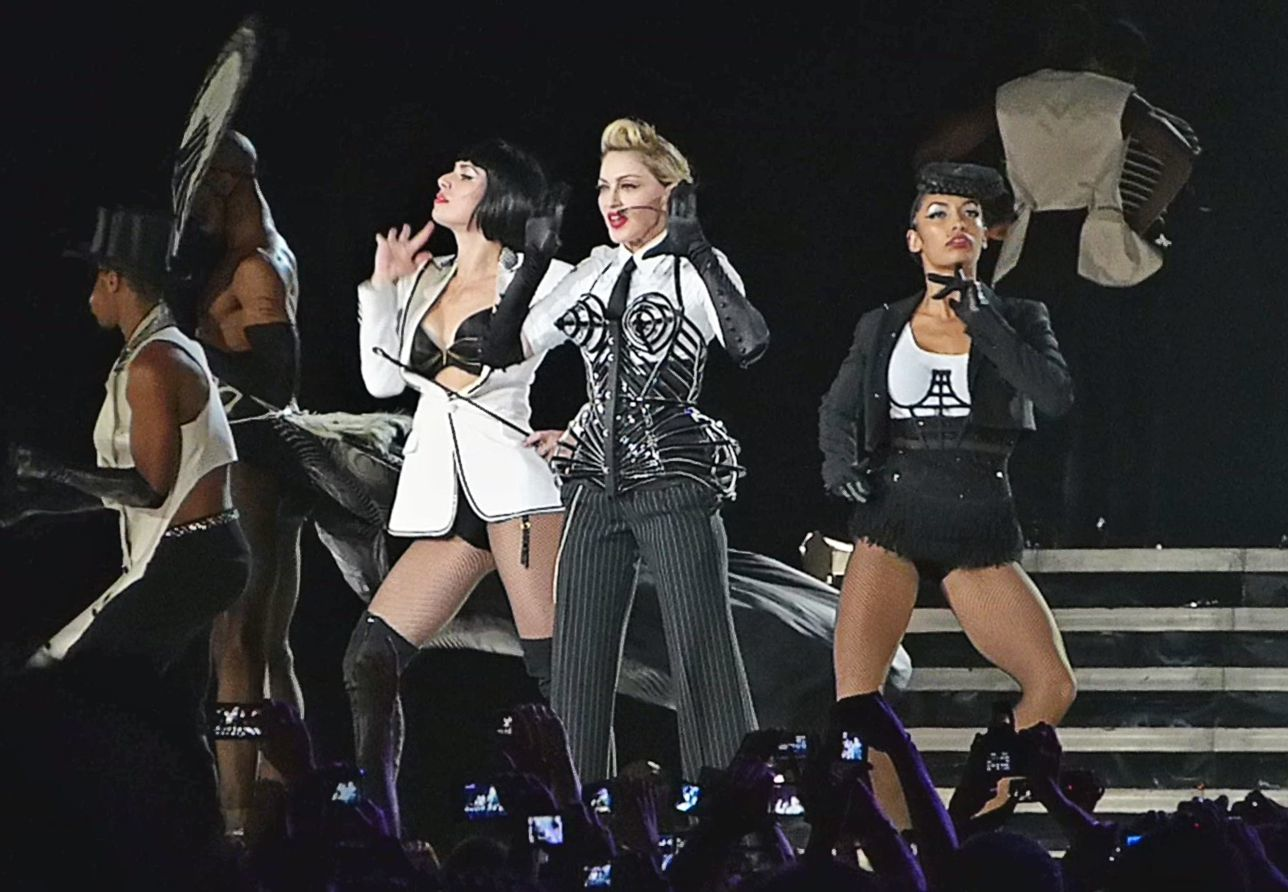
Tsai has revealed that the opening yoga act of her J1 World Tour (2004–2006) was inspired by Madonna's opening act during her Re-Invention World Tour (2004). Additionally, in the music video for her song "Honey Trap" (2010), she incorporated the vogue dance popularized by Madonna.

Tsai has cited Madonna, Whitney Houston, Mariah Carey, and Destiny's Child as major influences on her music career. In 1998, she won the singing competition held by MTV Mandarin, where she performed songs by Houston and Carey. She recalled that during her school years, she often listened to Western popular music—especially Houston—and would even record herself imitating her singing. She also mentioned that she deeply admired Destiny's Child for their ability to sing and dance simultaneously, considering them one of her role models.

Tsai has expressed her aspiration to become a stage performer akin to Madonna. She noted that Madonna has been a trendsetter in music, fashion, and performance, and although controversial at times, her work is now seen as pioneering and innovative. Her choreographer, Bruce Chang, once shared that Tsai closely studied Madonna's stage movements and worked hard to recreate similar effects in her own performances. Inspired by Madonna, Tsai believes that popular music should continuously embrace fresh sounds and elements to challenge conventional ideas and drive stylistic evolution in the music industry. In addition, Tsai has cited other artists who have influenced her, including Kylie Minogue, Britney Spears, Janet Jackson, and Lady Gaga.

=== Musical style ===
Tsai has utilized a diverse range of musical genres and concepts throughout her career. Tsai noted, "Apart from experimenting with a variety of styles, I try to interpret and express them with my own colors." Tsai's predominant musical style is dance-pop, she holds the belief that "every singer must establish their own identity and unique traits." The singer expressed that "Maybe I don't have many representative ballad works, but dance music is what I am best at."

Her debut album 1019 (1999) was primarily composed of ballads. The following year, Don't Stop continued in a similar vein but shifted toward more upbeat, rhythm-driven tracks. Her 2003 album Magic combined elements of disco, funk, and hip-hop, and marked the singer's shift towards a predominantly dance-oriented musical direction. Her 2004 album, Castle, expanded on the styles of its predecessor, while J-Game (2005) were heavily influenced by electronic music.

Dancing Diva (2006) is primarily a pop and electronic album. Agent J (2007) showcased Eurodance, while her 2009 album, Butterfly, experimented with synth-pop. Myself (2010) primarily utilized house music. Muse (2012) is a pop record with styles encompassing mainstream and independent music, reflecting a distinct shift from her earlier works. Play (2014) was largely influenced by electronic dance music styles such as trap and dubstep. Ugly Beauty (2018) integrated reggae, electronic, hip-hop, and other elements. Pleasure (2025) continued her electronic-driven approach, combining house, techno, and electropop influences.

=== Voice ===
Tsai possesses a mezzo-soprano vocal range. Since her debut, she has received criticism for her weak singing skills, directed towards her thin voice and limited vocal range. Taiwanese musician Bing Wang noted that while Tsai's voice might be considered average, he acknowledged the distinctiveness of her articulation. Despite these critiques, she debuted after winning the singing competition held by MTV Mandarin, where one of the judges, Wawa Chen, expressed appreciation for Tsai's voice.

Over time, Tsai's vocal performance has been noted for showing significant improvement. Sohu Entertainment felt that the singer's vocals and delivery had improved substantially over the years. Qu Er from Tencent Entertainment felt that Tsai's vocal skills have often been misinterpreted, and expressed that only a handful of singers can sustain such seamless breath control throughout an entire performance.

Tsai has been nominated for Golden Melody Award for Best Mandarin Female Singer five times, and won the award for the first time with her 2006 album Dancing Diva. Some people questioned whether her vocal ability was enough for Tsai to be qualified to win the award. In response, chief jury of the 18th Golden Melody Awards Liu Ya-wen publicly praised Tsai's singing and performance skills in Dancing Diva, and felt that the record signified the singer's transformation from merely a performer to a true vocalist.

During the 26th Golden Melody Awards in 2015, she received ten nominations for her 2014 album, Play. However, she was not nominated in the Best Mandarin Female Singer category after a judge pointed out significant pitch correction in the album, which swayed the votes of other judges. In response to this, Tsai's manager Tom Wang dismissed the claim that Tsai had been reliant on pitch correction while recording Play. DJ Casey Cheng commented that he did not see an issue with pitch correction in the first place, emphasizing that "records are designed to produce unique sounds."

In 2017, during her opening performance at the 54th Golden Horse Awards, she was off-key while singing a cover of "Tian Mi Mi" by Teresa Teng. As the following songs she performed were characterized by low pitches, critics believed her overall performance fell short of expectations as she usually excelled in songs with mid and high pitches. The performance sparked discussion and criticism, while Tsai openly acknowledged her mistakes. In 2026, Tsai won the Golden Melody Award for Best Mandarin Female Singer for the second time with her album Pleasure (2025). The jury stated that she had fully mastered and effectively utilized her vocal characteristics, demonstrating a diverse and nuanced singing technique.

=== Music videos ===
Tsai places great emphasis on creativity and visual expression in the production of her music videos, striving to balance artistic quality with commercial appeal. According to Apple Music, her videos are renowned for their ever-changing styles, ranging from vibrant and avant-garde to occasionally incorporating exotic elements. For example, "Prague Square" features Gothic architectural aesthetics, while "The Spirit of Knight" draws on elements of Siamese culture. Some of her music videos also engage with social issues. "We're All Different, Yet the Same" centers around a same-sex wedding to explore the theme of diverse families, while "Ugly Beauty" uses exaggerated visuals and narrative to critique conventional beauty standards. As noted by The Beijing News, while some of her videos continue to follow traditional presentation styles, others—such as "Play", "Womxnly", and "Lady in Red"—showcase bold, distinctive visual concepts, reflecting her ongoing evolution and innovation in music video aesthetics.

== Public image ==
Tsai captivated young audiences with her pure and sweet image in the early stage of her career, earning her the media nickname "Teenage Boy Killer". As her musical style and visual presentation evolved, she gradually transformed from a pop idol into one of the most iconic figures in Mandopop music. Since the 2010s, she has taken on a more active and creative role in the production of her albums, showcasing artistic autonomy and versatility that earned her titles such as "Queen of Reinvention" and "Queen of C-Pop".

Media outlets have often regarded Tsai's fashion choices and style changes. She has appeared in publications such as Vogue, Elle, Harper's Bazaar, and Marie Claire. She is also the first Chinese pop artist to have attended the Met Gala, the Victoria's Secret Fashion Show, and the "Big Four" Fashion Weeks.

Tsai is also an outspoken advocate for marriage equality and LGBTQ+ rights, often expressing support for the community and being celebrated as a gay icon. Billboard's Tamar Herman highlighted Tsai's work for promoting love and equality through her provocative songs and music videos in the traditionally conservative Chinese music industry. Songs such as "Fantasy", "Gentlewomen", "We're All Different, Yet the Same", and "Womxnly" reflect her compassion toward sexual minorities and her commitment to social advocacy. A supporter of feminism, she emphasizes the importance of self-confidence and self-affirmation for women, and promotes gender equality.

Tsai has been noted for her discipline and professionalism, particularly in relation to her appearance, dance training, and stage performances. She has described herself as a self-made performer rather than someone with innate talent, stating that she believes she must work harder than others to succeed. Tsai has learned skills such as yoga, rhythmic gymnastics, and pole dancing to enhance her performances and stage presence. Her passion of competitive fondant cake decoration led her to win awards in the field. In later years, Tsai has spoken about the importance of self-acceptance and finding peace and acknowledging personal imperfections.

== Legacy ==
Referred to as the "Queen of C-Pop", Tsai has emerged as a significant figure in the C-pop music scene, earning recognition for her music, image, dance, and resilience. Liu Hsiu-wen of Billboard noted that in the early 2000s, Taiwanese artists like Jay Chou and Tsai dominated Chinese-speaking music markets across Asia, marking a golden era for Taiwan's popular music. Former chairwoman of the Kuomintang, Hung Hsiu-chu, remarked that Tsai's artistic accomplishments have set a high standard in the C-pop music industry, adding that Tsai's name had been synonymous with a generation's vibrant youth over two decades. Liang Xiaohui of NetEase Entertainment suggested that when future generations reflect on the early 21st-century Chinese divas, Tsai might be the first name that comes to mind, in a similar vein to Madonna in the late 20th-century. The Grammy Awards recognized her remarkable influence on the Chinese music scene, acknowledging her as one of the key figures contributing to the global growth of Mandopop. In 2025, the Asia-Pacific Entrepreneurs Annual Forum selected her as one of the Asia-Pacific Most Influential Young Women. They highlighted her diverse musical style, fashion expression, and cultural impact, recognizing her as one of the exemplary figures of both artistic and commercial power for modern women in the Asia-Pacific region.

In an industry characterized by a prevalence of ballads, Tsai is regarded as a leading figure in dance-pop's mainstream acceptance within the Greater China region. Fan Jung-ching of Bloomberg Businessweek Taiwan referred to her as the "Great Chinese Dance Music Artist", writing how Tsai showcased the world-class quality of Chinese dance music to global audiences. Hou Cheng-nan, an associate professor at the Department of Mass Communication at I-Shou University, remarked how Tsai elevated the landscape of Chinese dance music and set a high standard that is difficult to surpass. QQ Music's critic Mimimao wrote that "Jolin Tsai is undoubtedly the biggest contributor to the development of electronic dance music in the C-pop music industry," and opined that Tsai's innovative approach had placed her far ahead of her contemporaries.

In addition to her influence on Chinese popular culture, Tsai has made significant contributions to social issues. Tamar Herman of Billboard described Tsai as a leading figure in Chinese popular music who has represented same-sex couples and diverse LGBTQ lifestyles through her vibrant popular songs, providing a platform for diverse expression in the conservative Chinese music scene. Herman noted that through her music that promoted self-love and understanding of differences, Tsai became a prominent icon in Asia's LGBTQ community. Liao Yuanling of Business Today wrote that Tsai consistently uses her platform to advocate for gender equality, empowering minority groups to speak up for themselves.

Tsai and her works have influenced numerous artists, including Cyndi Wang, Rainie Yang, A-Lin, Lala Hsu, Eve Ai, Shi Shi, and others. You Zuo from The Beijing News wrote, "As one of the most influential female stars in the C-pop music scene, Jolin Tsai's insistence on making breakthroughs in art and caring for the society deserves the respect of everyone who cares about C-pop music." Apple Music highlighted that Tsai's artistic legacy is built upon tenacity and pioneering vision, ensuring the enduring reach of her influence in music and popular culture.

== Other ventures ==
=== Endorsements ===
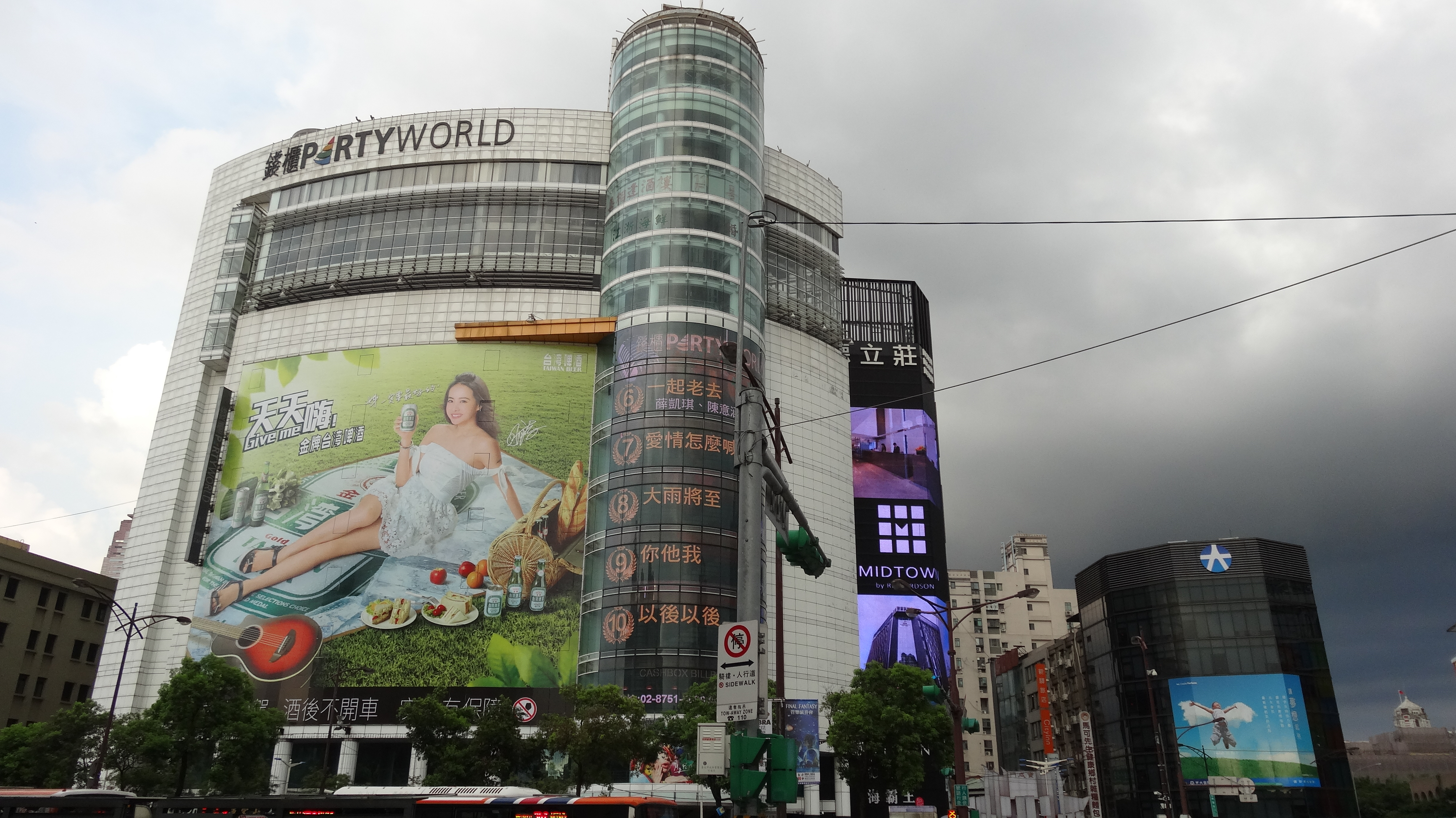
Taiwan Beer's advertisement featuring Tsai in Taipei

Tsai has endorsed a wide array of internationally recognized brands and products throughout her career, including Absolut Vodka, Adidas, Always, Balvenie, Bausch & Lomb, Bulgari, Crest, Diablo, Diesel, Dr. Jart+, Dungeon & Fighter, Gap, Head & Shoulders, Intel, Knorr, Lancôme, Levi's, L'Oréal, Lux, MAC, Max Factor, McDonald's, Mercedes Benz, Morinaga, Motorola, Nars, Olay, Pepsi, Pony, Puma, Quaker, Rémy Martin, Samsung, Shiseido, Standard Chartered, Sunbites, Swarovski, Toyota, Tropicana, Uber, Uber Eats, Valentino, Vidal Sassoon, Yamaha, and 7-Eleven.

=== Products ===
In September 2007, Tsai and her sister launched the nail polish brand Oops! Jealous, initially available through the Taiwanese online shopping platform PayEasy. Tsai played a key role in developing the brand's nail polish colors and styles. In August 2010, Oops! Jealous expanded its distribution by collaborating with PayEasy to sell products through vending machines at Qsquare in Taipei, Taiwan. By October 2011, the brand had entered the personal care retail market, establishing a presence in Watsons stores. However, the brand was discontinued in 2014.

In February 2009, Tsai, in partnership with Ken Erman, introduced the fashion brand Seventy Two Changes in New York City. The brand was initially sold at Nordstrom across 12 North American cities, with plans to expand into Asia, including Taiwan, China, Singapore, and Malaysia. In February 2010, it successfully entered the mainland Chinese market, opening its first flagship store at Shanghai Times Square. However, due to differences in business philosophy among shareholders in the U.S. and China, combined with the expiration of her two-year contract, Tsai stepped down as the brand's designer in 2011.

On October 20, 2015, Tsai launched a fondant cake fan page titled Your Majesty on Facebook. Subsequently, on December 7, 2015, she established a company focused on the fondant cake sector, offering customized cake orders via Facebook and Instagram. By January 8, 2018, she reported that her cake business employed four cake chefs.

Additionally, Tsai has collaborated with several brands to create co-branded products. Notably, in December 2018, Pony launched two limited-edition sneakers designed by her, based on the M100 series. In July 2019, Gap introduced six collaborative T-shirts that she designed, each inspired by a song from her 2018 album Ugly Beauty. Furthermore, in September 2019, Gap released four long-sleeved pullover hoodies designed by Tsai.

== Achievements ==
Tsai has been nominated 21 times at the Golden Melody Awards, including three nominations for Album of the Year, five for Song of the Year, five for Best Mandarin Album, five for Best Mandarin Female Singer, one for Best Composer, one for Best Single Producer, and one for Best Album Producer. She has won nine Golden Melody Awards in total: Album of the Year for Ugly Beauty and Pleasure, Song of the Year for "Marry Me Today", "The Great Artist", and "Womxnly", Best Mandarin Album for Play, Best Mandarin Female Singer for Dancing Diva and Pleasure, and the Favorite Female Singer/Group. Tsai holds the record for the most Golden Melody Award wins among Mandopop female artists, and she has been certified by the Guinness World Records as the singer with the most Song of the Year awards. Her 2014 album Play received ten nominations, making it one of the most-nominated albums in history, tied with Jay Chou's Fantasy (2001) and A-Mei's Amit (2009). Her album Ugly Beauty (2018) and Pleasure (2025) received eight and nine Golden Melody Award nominations, respectively.

Beyond the Golden Melody Awards, Tsai has received numerous other Chinese music honors, including awards from the Beijing Pop Music Awards, CCTV-MTV Music Awards, China Music Awards, Global Chinese Music Awards, Hito Music Awards, IFPI Hong Kong Top Sales Music Awards, KKBox Music Awards, Migu Music Awards, Music Radio China Top Chart Awards, and Singapore Hits Awards. In 2023, her song "Untitled" was nominated for Best Original Film Song at the 60th Golden Horse Awards. Internationally, Tsai has also been recognized with several awards, such as the 2001 MTV Video Music Award for International Viewers' Choice for the music video of "Fall in Love with a Street", the 2006 MTV Asia Award for The Style Award, and the 2015 Mnet Asian Music Award for Best Asian Artist Mandarin.

In terms of chart performance, Tsai has topped the Hit FM Top 100 Singles chart five times with the songs "Marry Me Today", "Sun Will Never Set", "Honey Trap", "Play", and "Ugly Beauty", making her the artist with the most number-one hits on the chart. Since her 2003 album Magic, each of her studio albums has been the highest-selling albums by a female singer in Taiwan for the year of its release, with Dancing Diva (2006), Agent J (2007), Butterfly (2009), and Ugly Beauty (2018) also being the overall highest-selling albums in the respective years. With over 25 million records sold, she stands as the highest-selling Taiwanese female recording artist since 2000.

Tsai has also been a consistent presence on the Forbes China Celebrity 100 list, ranking in the top 20 six times between 2010 and 2020, and earning the title of the number one Chinese female singer on three occasions. By 2014, her net worth had surpassed NT$2 billion, and between 2003 and 2022, she was recognized as the highest-paid Taiwanese female singer 16 times.

== Personal life ==
Tsai's personal life has long attracted attention from both the media and the public. Since her debut, she has been romantically linked to three fellow artists: Jay Chou, Eddie Peng, and Vivian Dawson. In January 2001, Tsai met Chou on the CTS variety show Guess. Later that year in December, the two were spotted dining together in Shinjuku, Japan, and were subsequently reported to have met privately on several occasions. However, in February 2005, Chou was seen vacationing in Japan with news anchor Patty Hou, after which Tsai and Chou began to keep their distance in public.

In January 2007, Tsai and Peng were seen traveling together in London, and were later reported to have met privately several more times. In 2008, Peng became involved in a dispute with his management company, prompting speculation that it was related to his rumored relationship with Tsai. In 2009, Peng's former manager indirectly confirmed that he and Tsai had been in a relationship for over three years, starting in mid-2006. They later broke up, and it was speculated that the split was due in part to Peng's mother disapproving of Tsai's reluctance to make the relationship public.

In July 2010, Dawson appeared in the music video for Tsai's song "Love Player". That September, the two were spotted vacationing in Tokyo and were later seen traveling together to various destinations. In November 2011, Tsai's father indirectly confirmed their relationship, also inadvertently mentioning that she had previously dated both Chou and Peng. In February 2013, Tsai traveled with Dawson to New Zealand to meet his family. Their relationship ended in November 2016, and it was confirmed by Tsai's manager Tom Wang the following month.

== Discography ==
- 1019 (1999)
- Don't Stop (2000)
- Show Your Love (2000)
- Lucky Number (2001)
- Magic (2003)
- Castle (2004)
- J-Game (2005)
- Dancing Diva (2006)
- Agent J (2007)
- Butterfly (2009)
- Myself (2010)
- Muse (2012)
- Play (2014)
- Ugly Beauty (2018)
- Pleasure (2025)

== Filmography ==
- Six Friends (2001)
- Come to My Place (2002)
- In Love (2002)
- Hi Working Girl (2003)
- Agent J (2007)
- Zootopia (2016)

== Bibliography ==
- Nineteen Years (2000)
- The Masque of the Princess, the Spirit of Knight (2002)
- Jolin's English Diary Book (2005)
- Jolin's Party (2006)
- Love Exercise (2008)
- Living Slim (2011)

== Tours ==
- J1 World Tour (2004–2006)
- Dancing Forever World Tour (2006–2009)
- Myself World Tour (2010–2013)
- Play World Tour (2015–2016)
- Ugly Beauty World Tour (2019–2024)
- Pleasure World Tour (2025–2027)

== Enterprises ==
- Oops! Jealous (2007–2014)
- Seventy Two Changes (2009–2011)
- Eternal Music Production Co., Ltd. (2009)
- Your Majesty (2015)

== See also ==
- Forbes China Celebrity 100
- Honorific nicknames in popular music
- List of best-selling albums in Taiwan
- List of dance-pop artists
