= Someday, Somewhere (Jolin Tsai song) =

Single by Jolin Tsai
- Language: Mandarin
- Released: October 31, 2023
- Studio: BB Road (Taipei)
- Genre: Pop
- Length: 4:03
- Label: Eternal
- Composers: Jolin Tsai; Richard Craker
- Lyricists: Jolin Tsai; Jen Chih
- Producers: Jolin Tsai; Howe Chen

Jolin Tsai singles chronology
"Untitled" (2022)	"Someday, Somewhere" (2023)	"Oh La La La" (2023)

Music video
- "Someday, Somewhere" on YouTube

"Someday, Somewhere" is a song by Taiwanese singer Jolin Tsai, written by Tsai, Richard Craker, and Jen Chih, and produced by Tsai and Howe Chen. The track was released as a standalone single on October 31, 2023, by Eternal, and serves as the theme song for the Netflix series At the Moment (2023). Tsai and Craker received a nomination for Best Composer at the 35th Golden Melody Awards for their work on the track.

== Background and release ==
On September 27, 2023, Tsai hinted at the possibility of releasing a new single later in the year, sparking anticipation among her fans. On October 5, 2023, Netflix unveiled the trailer for At the Moment (2023), which prominently featured Tsai's new theme song, "Someday, Somewhere". The following October 29, 2023, Warner officially announced via social media that the single would be released at midnight on October 31, 2023. Just days later, on November 9, 2023, Tsai released the song's cinematic music video on her YouTube channel.

== Composition and recording ==
"Someday, Somewhere" was co-written by Tsai and Richard Craker, who had previously collaborated on "Ugly Beauty" and "Hubby". The song was built around a gentle piano arrangement, complemented by lush string instruments, with Tsai's vocals layered to match the emotional depth of the show's themes. The lyrics express a longing for love, coupled with the regret of words left unsaid in the moment. Described as a dialogue between the present self and a future self, the song reflects on love, time, and the connections we forge.

In the creative process, Tsai worked closely with Lien Yi-chi, the lead director of At the Moment (2023), who shared the series' script and suggested that Tsai approach the theme from an angel's perspective, observing urban romance on public transportation. Tsai crafted a ballad that balances beauty with regret, aligning both melody and lyrics with the series' themes of love and reflection.

For the first time, Tsai also took on the role of vocal producer, alongside co-producer Howe Chen. While her demo recordings showcased strong emotional delivery, Tsai worked diligently in the studio to adjust phrasing, resonance, and dynamics. Tsai even set up a home studio to rehearse, often recording multiple takes before heading to the official sessions. The track features subdued phrasing in the beginning, which gradually builds into a soaring, emotionally charged climax.

== Critical reception ==
Zhao Buyi, a Taiwanese musician, lauded Tsai's involvement in the composition, calling the song a "healing ballad for autumn" that conveys both courage and strength through Tsai's impassioned vocals, especially with the lyric line, "confess bravely, turn away bravely, be brave wholeheartedly".

Hu Zhimin also commented on the song's melody, describing it as both beautiful and reflective of the hesitation and determination often felt in love. Zhong Wanyun, a musician, observed that the song carries the atmospheric qualities of early 2000s ballads, with a slower pace and a focus on musical detail.

Dai Ruo My Yi, a reviewer, highlighted Tsai's more delicate and airy vocal delivery, noting the blend of warmth, grandeur, and clarity in her voice. San Shi Yi Sheng, another critic, remarked that the song revealed Tsai's ethereal ballad style, reminiscent of her early 1019 (1999) era but now with more refined breath control.

On PlayMusic, reviewer Creamypolly praised the song for showcasing Tsai's first effort in combining lyric-writing, composition, and production. The review noted the track's rare softness and near a cappella style, with no choreography, allowing Tsai's vocal timbre to shine through. Tsai's voice was described as tender yet resilient, making the song "very beautiful to listen to."

== Awards ==
On May 16, 2024, Tsai and Richard Craker received a Best Composer nomination at the 35th Golden Melody Awards for their work on "Someday, Somewhere."

== Charts ==
=== Weekly charts ===
Chart (2023)	Peak position
China (Tencent)	60

== Personnel ==
Credits adapted from Tsai's official Facebook.

- Jolin Tsai – vocal production
- Lin Jie – piano and string arrangement, drums, production assistance
- Audi Lin – bass
- Howe Chen– drums
- Tsai Yao-yu – string coordination, first violin
- Just Busy Music Studio – strings
- Chen Yi-yung – first violin
- Luo Szu-yun – first violin
- Chu Yi-ning – first violin
- Shen Yi-wen – second violin
- Huang Yu-jou – second violin
- Huang Chin-cheng – second violin
- Kan Wei-peng – viola
- Pan Tzu-chi – viola
- Mou Chi-tung – viola
- Yeh Yu-hsin – cello
- Pai Chu-chun – cello
- Yeh Yu-hsuan – vocal engineering
- AJ Chen – vocal engineering, mixing
- BB Road Studio – vocal recording studio
- Chang Min-hsiang – string engineering
- Chu Pin-hao – assistant string engineering
- Mega Force Studio – string recording studio, mixing studio
- Lin Shun-yu – string ensemble administration
- Shen Kuan-lin – production assistance

== Release history ==
Release dates and formats for "Someday, Somewhere"
Region	Date	Format(s)	Distributor
Various	October 31, 2023	Digital download; streaming	Eternal
China	October 31, 2023	Streaming	YDX
