= 1J =

1J or 1-J may refer to:

- AH-1J, a model of Bell AH-1 SuperCobra
- ISS 1J, designation for STS-124

== See also ==
- Joule
- J1 (disambiguation)
