= Oh La La La (Jolin Tsai song) =

Single by Jolin Tsai
- Language: Mandarin
- Released: November 20, 2023
- Studio: Karmas (Sattahip)
- Genre: Pop
- Length: 3:00
- Label: Eternal
- Songwriters: Jolin Tsai; Richard Craker; Presto'C; Wendy Wen
- Producers: Richard Craker; Jolin Tsai

Jolin Tsai singles chronology
"Someday, Somewhere" (2023)	"Oh La La La" (2023)	"Pleasure" (2025)

Music video
- "Oh La La La" on YouTube

"Oh La La La" is a song by Taiwanese singer Jolin Tsai, written by Tsai, Richard Craker, Presto'C, and Wendy Wen, and produced by Tsai and Craker. The track, which serves as the theme song for McDonald's Taiwan's 40th anniversary, was released as a single on November 20, 2023, by Eternal.

== Background ==
After releasing the theme song "Someday, Somewhere" for the Netflix series At the Moment (2023) on October 31, 2023, Tsai's collaborator Richard Craker shared on Instagram that he had traveled to Taiwan to work on another project with Tsai. Shortly thereafter, on November 17, 2023, McDonald's Taiwan celebrated its 40th anniversary, announcing Tsai as the brand's new ambassador. The company also featured Tsai in its anniversary short film, The Simple Happiness, which revisited four decades of McDonald's history across five eras.

Tsai had previously endorsed McDonald's in various campaigns, including the "Shake Shake Fries" promotions in 2003 and 2005, and the "McRib" campaign in 2004. At the anniversary event, McDonald's confirmed that Tsai had written and performed the 40th anniversary theme song. The song's lyric video was released on McDonald's official YouTube channel, and Tsai announced the official release of the single on November 19, 2023.

== Composition ==
The track features an upbeat Motown-inspired style, with lively melodies and catchy lyrics. Its central message emphasizes that simple happiness is always within reach. According to Tsai, the refrain "Oh La La La" represents an instinctive sound of satisfaction when enjoying food, symbolizing the joy found in life's simplest pleasures.

Tsai worked once again with Richard Craker, who had previously co-written "Ugly Beauty", "Hubby", and "Someday, Somewhere". Tsai described the creative process as one rooted in mutual trust and a quirky sense of humor. Despite being indecisive at times during production, she relied on remote discussions with Craker to finalize the arrangements and mixing. Tsai also mentioned that finding the right instrumental textures was particularly challenging, comparing herself to a beginner experimenting with various sounds through online research before completing the track.

== Music video ==
The official music video for "Oh La La La" premiered on November 24, 2023, directed by Dawson Pon. Blending surrealist visuals with theatrical elements, the video centers on three key concepts: "a heart that never grows old", "savoring the moment", and "cherishing loved ones". Tsai appears in the video with braided heart-shaped pigtails and high-slit costumes, referencing McDonald's "I'm Lovin' It" slogan. In the narrative, Tsai descends in a hot-air balloon, landing in a chaotic office setting where she transforms into a glamorous queen. Leading a playful, hypnotic dance sequence, Tsai infuses the mundane office environment with joy and magic, symbolizing the video's themes of happiness and fulfillment.

== Awards ==
In February 2024, the Golden Wolf Awards announced its nominees, with Tsai receiving a nomination for Best Vocal Performance for "Oh La La La". Additionally, Tungus Chan, Yali Chiu, and Johnny Ho were nominated for Best Styling Design for their work on the music video.

== Charts ==
=== Weekly charts ===
Chart (2023)	Peak position
China (Tencent)	65

== Credits and personnel ==
Credits are adapted from the description of the music video for "Oh La La La" on YouTube.

Music

- Karma Studios – recording studio
- Richard Craker – instrumentation, mixing
- Marcus Allan – mixing, mastering

Video

- FullHouse – production
- Dawson Pon – direction
- Wang Hsin-ju – assistant direction
- Sam Chou – executive direction
- Nancy Chen – executive direction
- Show Liu – production
- Chien Yun-yi – production assistance
- Lin Tzu-jung – production assistance
- Kuo Chung-che – production assistance
- Fan Tzu-chi – production assistance
- Kiel Tutin – choreography
- Andy Hsu – choreography consultation
- Jalen Forward – dance
- Adam Vesperman – dance
- Carl Flavell-Trice – dance
- Jackson Tuarae – dance
- Amanda Li – dance
- Kuo Ching-chen – dance
- Chen Yu-hui – dance
- Lin Tsai-lo – dance

== Release history ==
Release dates and formats for "Oh La La La"
Region	Date	Format(s)	Distributor
Various	November 20, 2023	Digital download; streaming	Eternal
