= Seventy Two Changes =

American clothing brand

- Product type: Clothing
- Current owner: Truth & Pride LLC
- Country: United States
- Introduced: 2009; 17 years ago
- Discontinued: 2011; 15 years ago
- Markets: Asia; North America
- Website: seventytwochanges.com

Seventy Two Changes was a fashion brand jointly founded in New York City in 2009 by the American apparel company Truth & Pride and Taiwanese singer Jolin Tsai. The brand later expanded its operations to Mainland China, Hong Kong, Taiwan, Singapore, and Malaysia. In 2011, the company ceased operations due to differences in business philosophies between its American and Mainland Chinese shareholders.

== History ==
Ken Erman previously served as president and co-founder of the American fashion brand L.A.M.B. Passionate about various music genres, he sought to merge music with fashion. Hailing from a family deeply rooted in the fashion industry, his family owns Notations, a clothing company headquartered in Pennsylvania. Erman accumulated 12 years of experience in the apparel industry within the family business, frequently traveling across Asia to build partnerships and deepen his understanding of fashion. In 2003, he co-founded the L.A.M.B. brand with American singer Gwen Stefani. Years later, recognizing the rapidly growing Asian market, Erman met with Truth & Pride president Brenda Lin and Taiwanese singer Jolin Tsai in Taiwan. Sharing a common brand vision, the three parties collaborated to launch the brand Seventy Two Changes. Tsai became the first Asian celebrity to successfully partner with an American apparel company. The brand combined Eastern and Western cultural influences, introducing designs to a global market.

In February 2009, Seventy Two Changes was officially established in New York City. The brand name was inspired by Tsai's 2003 album "Magic" (also literally translated as See My 72 Changes in Chinese), symbolizing a diverse range of styles. At the brand's launch event in Manhattan's SoHo Showroom, Tsai announced the debut collection's theme, "Music", featuring four major series: "Rocker Chic", "Disco Glamour", "Street Jazz", and "Girly Sweet". The collection comprised 100 pieces and was slated for sale at Nordstrom stores across 12 U.S. cities, with plans to expand into Asian markets within the same year. By August 2009, during a San Francisco event, Tsai announced that the brand had begun selling in Taiwan, Hong Kong, Singapore, and parts of Malaysia, increasing its presence to 30 cities. She noted strong sales performance for the fall/winter collection, with shareholders requesting 300 designs per season going forward. That season's sales reached approximately US$1 million, with the spring/summer collection sales rising by 60% compared to the debut season.

In February 2010, Tsai attended the fall/winter collection launch in New York City, themed "Flamenco", which included four series: "Pop Electronica", "Urban Rock", "Gypsy Romance", and "Timeless Luxury". That same month, the brand opened its first flagship store in Shanghai Times Square and officially entered the Mainland China market. In 2011, due to differing business philosophies between the brand's American and Mainland Chinese shareholders, combined with the expiration of Tsai's two-year designer contract, she stepped down from her design role. Tsai indicated plans to potentially launch a new fashion brand for online retail. Meanwhile, Erman shifted his focus back to managing Truth & Pride.
