= Castle (Jolin Tsai album) =

2004 studio album by Jolin Tsai

- Standard edition cover

Studio album by Jolin Tsai
- Released: February 27, 2004
- Genre: Pop
- Length: 55:12
- Label: Sony
- Producer: Bing Wang; Peter Lee; Jay Chou; Jamie Hsueh; Huang Yi; G-Power

Jolin Tsai chronology
The Age of Innocence (2003)	Castle (2004)	J9 (2004)

Castle (Chinese: 城堡) is the sixth studio album by Taiwanese singer Jolin Tsai, released on February 27, 2004, by Sony. Produced by Bing Wang, Peter Lee, Jay Chou, Jamie Hsueh, Huang Yi, and G-Power, the album blends a diverse range of musical styles, including pop, hip-hop, Latin, chanson, heavy metal, and British rock.

The album sold over 300,000 copies in Taiwan and surpassed 1.5 million copies across Asia, making it the second best-selling album in Taiwan in 2004 and the highest-selling album by a female artist in the country that year.

== Background and development ==
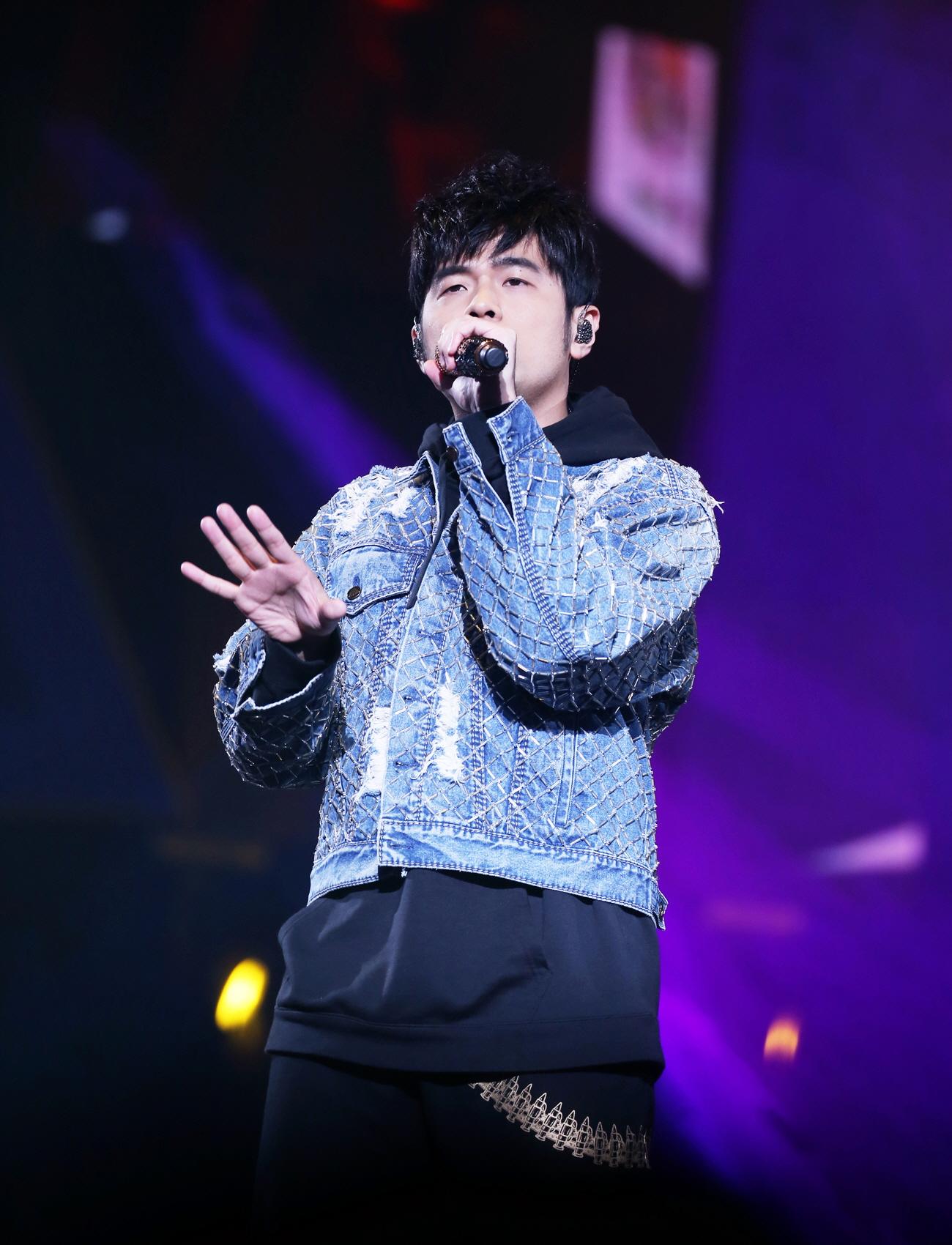
Jay Chou, a key collaborator on the album

On November 13, 2003, media reports announced that Tsai would begin recording a new album scheduled for release in January 2004. However, on December 14, 2003, it was revealed that due to Tsai's high standards, several songs were re-recorded, resulting in the album's release being postponed until after the 2004 Lunar New Year.

On January 9, 2004, the media reported that Jay Chou had composed a song for Tsai's upcoming album. Later, on February 10, 2004, further details emerged confirming the album's release date as February 27. Due to the pressure, Tsai recorded each song four to five times. Jay Chou contributed a total of three songs to the album.

The album continued to feature the production team from her 2003 album Magic. Tsai stated, "Because of the high demands, the record company's expectations were also extremely high. Everyone almost felt depressed—95 points wasn't even acceptable."

== Writing and recording ==
"Pirates" blends a medieval retro atmosphere with flamenco and hip-hop elements, incorporating various sound effects such as scratching. Jay Chou personally contributed to the backing vocals and rap sections. "36 Tricks of Love" expresses the independent romantic views of Generation Z women. Along with "Priority", it helped develop the "sweet metal" style, merging heavy metal rock instruments like electric guitar and bass with dance beats, creating a sharp, explosive sound that contrasts vividly with Tsai's sweet vocals. Tsai ventured into punk rock for the first time; despite numerous challenges during recording, she was ultimately satisfied with the result.

"The Smell of Lemon Grass" showcases Tsai's richer vocal expression and emotional control. "Love Love Love" is adapted from Nu Virgos' "Stop! Stop! Stop!" and combines French chanson with Mediterranean southern European romantic flair. Its distinctive rhythm and sweet vocals evoke feelings of happiness and warmth. "The Starter" features lyrics penned by Tsai herself, expressing her views on love: indifferent to third parties, not blaming each other after breakups, demonstrating mature emotional depth and vocal prowess.

Additionally, "Disappearing Castle" portrays the bitterness following a broken relationship. "Good Cat" mixes Latin vibes with heavy rhythmic hip-hop, where Tsai cleverly mimics cat sounds, presenting a dual style of coolness and sweetness. "Rewind" carries a British rock style.

== Title and artwork ==
The album title Castle symbolizes a mysterious and fashionable musical fortress waiting to be explored by fans. Tsai explained that the song "Disappearing Castle" represents lost love, and she described the album as a castle filled with treasures—each song is a valuable gem to her.

The album's overall concept revolves around three natural elements: "Sky", "Earth", and "Sea", expressed through "The Flying Bird of the Sky", "The White Horse of the Forest", and "The Blue Fish of the Deep Sea", showcasing diverse musical styles. "The Flying Bird of the Sky" represents passionate uptempo tracks, "The White Horse of the Forest" embodies exotic-flavored songs, and "The Blue Fish of the Deep Sea" signifies lyrical ballads. Tsai further explained that the three colors of costumes in the album represent these themes: pink symbolizes the "Flying Bird of the Sky", blue stands for the "Blue Fish of the Deep Sea", and green represents the "White Horse of the Forest".

To bring the album's concept to life visually, the record company invested NT$3 million and invited Japanese stylists Yuichi Miyashi and Yasuyuki Watanabe to design the visual style. The two stylists began planning six months before the album release and met with Tsai three months prior, traveling to Paris to select costumes. Miyashi also designed a personal logo for Tsai, turning the initial "J" of her English name into a flying bird shape, symbolizing the dynamic stage presence and dance charisma.

For the deluxe edition, the photo shoot featured Tsai in castle-themed scenes crafted with various materials, echoing the album's concept. She said that pairing a pure white cake with pure white clothing conveyed a sense of both fantasy and reality.

== Release and promotion ==
On February 11, 2004, Tsai released the lead track "Pirates". Two days later, on February 13, pre-orders for the album began, with a VCD featuring the music video for "Pirates" offered as a pre-order gift. On February 22, 2004, Tsai premiered "Pirates" at the Red House Theater Square in Taipei, and the event cost over NT$1 million. Tsai expressed her hope that the album would be recognized both for its musical quality and sales performance.

The album was officially released on February 27, 2004 including a new CD and a bonus VCD containing the documentary 2003 Magic Performances Documentary. On the same day, Tsai held the album press conference, where media revealed that the production budget was approximately NT$100 million. It was also announced that she planned to embark on a concert tour after the promotional period.

On April 17, 2004, Tsai held the It's Love Concert in Taipei, attracting over 10,000 attendees. On April 30, 2004, she released the album's deluxe edition, which included ten additional music videos and a remixed version of "36 Tricks of Love".

=== Music videos ===
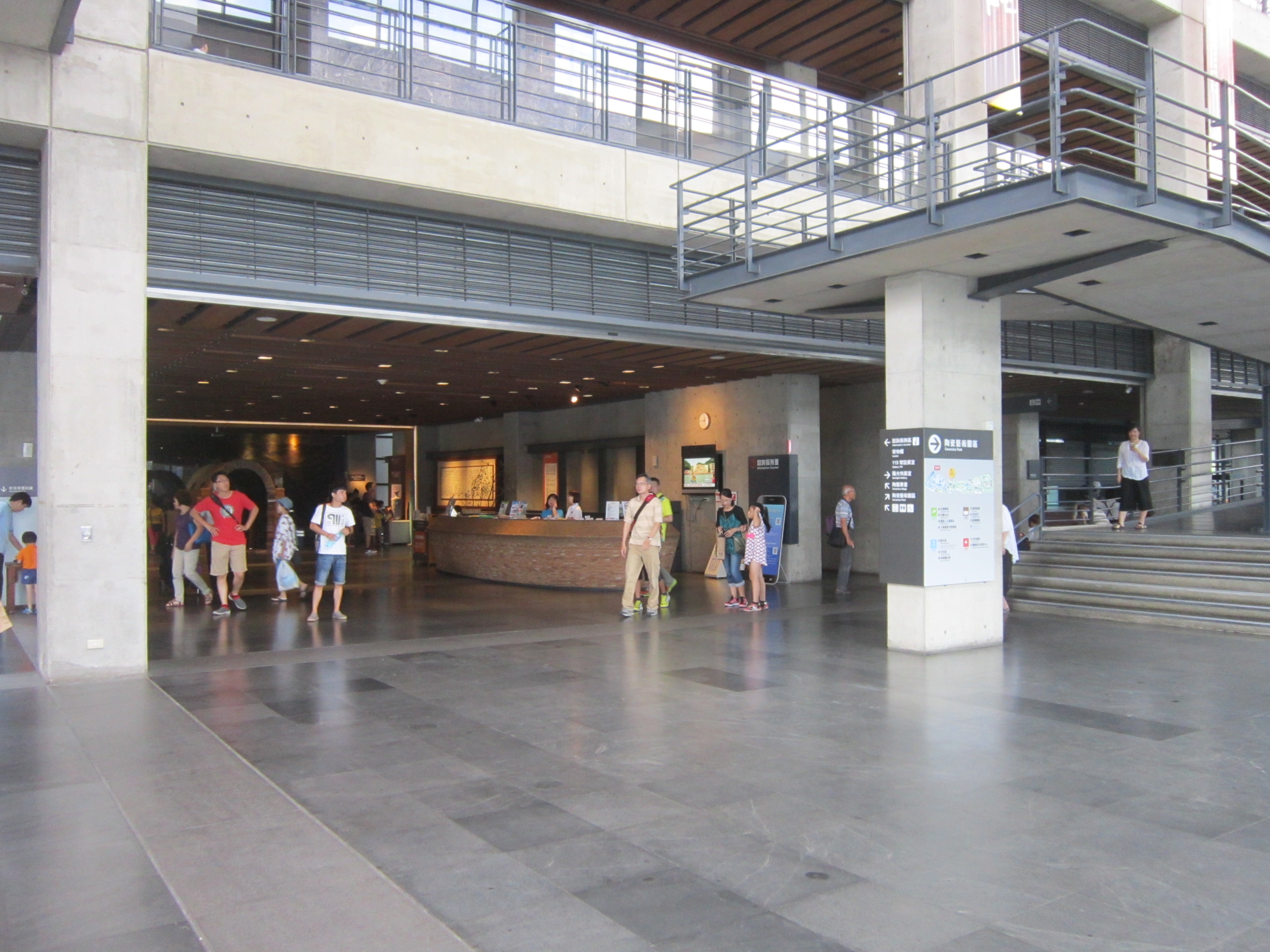
Yingge Ceramics Museum, one of the filming locations for the music video of "The Smell of Lemon Grass"

The music video for "Pirates" was directed by Marlboro Lai, with a production budget of NT$3 million. To complement the fusion of flamenco and hip-hop styles, Tsai appears in various looks throughout the video, including a pirate captain wearing a red headscarf and wielding a rapier, and a pirate princess dressed in a puffed skirt. Tsai expressed pride in her first-ever male costume, saying that the sword-fighting scenes made her feel quite "manly". The choreography, designed by Bruce Chang, blends hip-hop and flamenco elements, showcasing a dance battle between "male and female Jolin Tsai" in the video. Tsai explained that the determined gaze in the dance conveys a message of challenge. To depict a medieval pirate treasure battle, the director invited a professional art team to create elaborate sets, building a detailed pirate ship cabin decorated with antiques and gold ornaments. The video was filmed over three days and took ten days for post-production.

The music video for "36 Tricks of Love" was directed by Kuang Sheng, while "It's Love" was directed by Marlboro Lai. The video for "The Smell of Lemon Grass" was directed by Tony Lin and shot at locations including the Yingge Ceramics Museum. The video for "Love Love Love" was co-directed by Marlboro Lai and Bill Chia, featuring mambo-inspired choreography influenced by the Broadway style from the film Chicago. The music video for "The Starter" was also directed by Tony Lin.

=== Live performances ===
On July 6, 2004, Tsai participated in the 2004 Perfect Show Beijing, where she performed the song "36 Tricks of Love". On July 24, she attended the 6th CCTV-MTV Music Awards, performing "36 Tricks of Love" once again. On August 1, 2004, Tsai took part in the 2004 Metro Radio Mandarin Hits Music Awards, where she performed "Pirates". On August 16, 2004, she performed "36 Tricks of Love" and "Rewind" at the Qingdao Beer Festival Opening Ceremony. On September 4, 2004, Tsai attended the 4th Global Chinese Music Awards, where she performed "Pirates".

On September 24, 2004, she participated in the 5th Golden Eagle TV Arts Festival Concert, performing both "36 Tricks of Love" and "Rewind". On December 17, 2004, Tsai performed "Pirates" at the 2004 TVB8 Mandarin Music On Demand Awards. On December 26, 2004, she took part in the 2004 Metro Radio Hits Music Awards, again performing "Pirates". On January 11, 2005, Tsai attended the 11th China Music Awards, where she performed both "Pirates" and "36 Tricks of Love". On February 8, 2005, she participated in the CCTV New Year's Gala, performing "36 Tricks of Love".

=== Touring ===
On July 8, 2004, Tsai announced that she would kick off her J1 World Tour on August 7, 2004 at the Hongkou Football Stadium in Shanghai, China. The tour lasted one year and nine months, with eight shows held across seven cities worldwide. It concluded on April 22, 2006, at the Bren Events Center in Irvine, United States.

== Commercial performance ==
On February 22, 2004, media reports revealed that the album's pre-orders in Taiwan exceeded 60,000 copies within six days of opening. In its first week of release, the album topped the weekly sales charts of G-Music and Asia Music in Taiwan. By April 6, 2004, it had maintained the number one position on G-Music's weekly chart for four consecutive weeks, with sales surpassing 200,000 copies in Taiwan. By May 3, 2004, sales in Taiwan had exceeded 250,000 copies. On May 15, 2004, media reported that total sales across Asia had surpassed 1.5 million copies. By May 24, 2004, the album had sold over 450,000 copies in Mainland China. On August 4, 2004, the album had stayed at number one on Asia Music's' weekly chart for nine consecutive weeks.

On December 29, 2004, media reports named the album the second best-selling album of 2004 in Taiwan and the top-selling album by a female artist that year. On January 28, 2005, it was ranked tenth in the annual sales of Mandarin albums in Singapore for 2004. On March 23, 2005, the album was also listed among the top ten best-selling Mandarin albums in Hong Kong for 2004. Ultimately, the album sold over 300,000 copies in Taiwan and more than 1.5 million copies across Asia.

Additionally, the songs "It's Love" and "36 Tricks of Love" ranked number 8 and number 78 respectively on Taiwan's Hit FM Top 100 Singles of 2004.

== Critical reception ==
Tencent Entertainment commented that this album serves as a continuation of Tsai's Magic (2003), with echoes of the previous work evident in her styling, musical style, and even some song titles. They noted that the record company maintained the production approach of the earlier album with only minor adjustments, successfully sustaining the commercial momentum and further solidifying Tsai's position in the Taiwanese and broader Mandopop scene. Sina Entertainment pointed out that while Magic (2003) was a bold breakthrough, Castle continued its style and quality; however, due to the striking freshness of the previous album, Castle lacked a certain element of surprise. The website 21hifi observed that Tsai demonstrated solid vocal skills since her debut, and by the time of Castle, her singing had matured, balancing the rhythmic drive of uptempo tracks with the emotional expression of ballads. Overall, the album helped reinforce her artistic achievements.

== Accolades ==
On July 24, 2004, Tsai won the Best Female Singer Taiwan award at the 6th CCTV-MTV Music Awards for the album Castle. On August 1, 2004, she won the Best Female Singer and Best Stage Performance at the 2004 Metro Radio Mandarin Hits Music Awards, with her song "It's Love" earning the Top Songs award. On August 5, 2004, Tsai won the Top 20 Singers award at the 3rd MTV Mandarin Awards. On September 4, 2004, she won the Media Recommended Award and Best All-around Artist at the 4th Global Chinese Music Awards, while her song "Pirates" won the Top 20 Songs and Best Music Arrangement.

On September 10, 2004, she received the Most Popular Female Singer and Most Popular Taiwan Singer at the Singapore Hit Awards 2004. On November 15, 2004, Tsai was nominated for the Favorite Artist Taiwan award at the MTV Asia Awards 2005. On December 17, 2004, she won the Most Popular Female Singer award at the 2004 TVB8 Mandarin Music On Demand Awards, while "Pirates" earned the Top Songs award. On December 27, 2004, Tsai won the 2004 Metro Radio Hits Music Awards for Most Popular Mandarin Female Singer and Most Popular Asian Female Singer, with "Pirates" winning the Top Mandarin Songs award.

On January 11, 2005, she won the Most Popular Hong Kong/Taiwan Female Singer award at the 11th China Music Award, while the music video for "Pirates" was awarded Best Hong Kong/Taiwan Music Video. On January 16, 2005, Tsai won the Hito Music Awards' Best Female Singer, and "It's Love" was ranked among the Top 10 Songs. On March 12, 2005, she was named the Most Popular Taiwan Female Singer at the Music Pioneer Awards. On March 23, 2005, Castle was recognized as one of the Top 10 Best-Selling Mandarin Albums of 2004 at the IFPI Hong Kong Album Sales Awards.

On April 7, 2005, the music video for "Pirates" was nominated for Best Buzz Asia Taiwan at the 2005 MTV Video Music Awards Japan. On June 13, 2005, the music video for "Pirates" won the Best Music Video award at the China Gold Disc Awards. Additionally, "Pirates" won the Top 10 Mandarin Songs award on the Canadian Chinese Pop Music Awards.

== Track listing ==
Castle – Standard / Celebration edition
No.	Title	Lyrics	Music	Producer(s)	Length
1.	"36 Tricks of Love" (愛情三十六計)	Kiki Hu	Savan Kotecha; Andrew Frampton; Wayne Wilkins	Bing Wang	3:34
2.	"It's Love" (就是愛)	Simon Jiang	Jay Chou	Bing Wang	4:16
3.	"The Smell of Lemon Grass" (檸檬草的味道)	Francis Lee	Peter Lee	Peter Lee	4:32
4.	"Pirates" (海盜)	Issac Chen	Jay Chou	Jay Chou	4:35
5.	"The Starter" (始作俑者)	Jolin Tsai	Jamie Hsueh	Jamie Hsueh	4:36
6.	"Love Love Love"	Simon Jiang	Konstantin Meladze	Huang Yi	3:48
7.	"Disappearing Castle" (消失的城堡)	Kevin Yi	Alex Chang Jien	Peter Lee	4:10
8.	"Nice Cat" (乖貓)	Issac Chen	Anna Lidner; Charles Kwashie Tamakloe	Bing Wang	3:32
9.	"Priority" (第一優先)	Francis Lee	Dawn Joseph; Henry Gorman	Bing Wang	3:34
10.	"Rewind" (倒帶)	Vincent Fang	Jay Chou	G-Power	4:25
Total length:					41:02

Castle – Standard edition (VCD)
No.	Title	Length
1.	"2003 Magic Performances Documentary"	14:10
Total length:		14:10

Castle – Celebration edition (CD)
No.	Title	Length
11.	"36 Tricks of Love" (remix)	5:01
Total length:		5:01

Castle – Celebration edition (DVD)
No.	Title	Length
1.	"36 Tricks of Love" (music video)	3:37
2.	"It's Love" (music video)	4:18
3.	"The Smell of Lemon Grass" (music video)	4:28
4.	"Pirates" (music video)	4:37
5.	"The Starter" (music video)	4:37
6.	"Love Love Love" (music video)	3:48
7.	"Disappearing Castle" (music video)	4:09
8.	"Nice Cat" (music video)	3:34
9.	"Priority" (music video)	3:35
10.	"Rewind" (music video)	4:25
Total length:		41:08

== Release history ==
Region	Date	Format(s)	Edition	Distributor
China	February 27, 2004	CD; casestte	Standard	Epic
China	February 27, 2004	CD	Limited	Epic
China	April 30, 2004	VCD	Video compilation	Epic
Malaysia	February 27, 2004	CD+VCD	Standard	Sony
Malaysia	April 30, 2004	VCD	Video compilation	Sony
Singapore	February 27, 2004	CD+VCD	Standard	Sony
Singapore	April 30, 2004	VCD	Video compilation	Sony
Taiwan	February 27, 2004	CD+VCD	Standard	Sony
Taiwan	April 30, 2004	CD+DVD	Celebration	Sony
Taiwan	December 26, 2018	LP	Standard	Sony
