= Agent J (film) =

2007 Taiwanese film

- Directed by: Jeff Chang; Marlboro Lai; Kuang Sheng
- Written by: Jeff Chang; Chen Yin-jung
- Produced by: Ho Meng-hung; Wang Han-sheng; Lin Hsin-hung; Torquil Boyd; Rujiraporn Hanchaina; Huang Wei-hao
- Starring: Jolin Tsai; Kim Jae-won; Stephen Fung; Carl Ng
- Cinematography: Wang Tsan-chin; Chin Hsin; Tiwa Moeithaisong
- Edited by: Chen Jung-huang; Chiang Chih-hsin
- Distributed by: EMI
- Release date: September 5, 2007
- Running time: 70 minutes
- Country: Taiwan
- Languages: Mandarin; Korean; English; Cantonese; Thai
- Budget: NT$33 million

Agent J (Chinese: 特務J) is a 2007 Taiwanese action romance film. Directed by Chang Jeff Chang, Marlboro Lai, and Kuang Sheng, the film stars Jolin Tsai, Kim Jae-won, Stephen Fung, and Carl Ng. The film is composed of three distinct, unconnected segments, each telling the story of Agent J and her relationships with three different romantic partners.

== Plot ==
Chapter One: The Fate of Agent

Jolin and S are a couple vacationing in Paris. After S asks a local for directions, he turns around only to find that Jolin has disappeared. Despite searching frantically nearby, S is unable to locate her. Unbeknownst to him, Jolin has already been targeted by a secret organization, who abducts her and subjects her to brainwashing and intensive training, transforming her into an agent known only as "J". Now, as an operative of the organization, Jolin is assigned covert missions. For the three years following Jolin's disappearance, S stays in Paris, becoming a personal bodyguard specializing in protecting witnesses. He also devotes himself to uncovering the truth about the mysterious agent "J", who eerily resembles his lost love. Jolin's latest mission is to assassinate the very man—S—who has been relentlessly investigating her. She follows him to a rooftop, where she executes her mission with cold precision. However, just before his death, S offers her a smile that leaves her deeply confused. Driven by this lingering question, Jolin visits S's apartment, where she uncovers the secrets of her own past.

Chapter Two: The Crack of Memory

In a British prison, Jolin is recruited by a secret organization, who offers her a deal: complete a high-profile assassination in exchange for her freedom. Her target is Bluebeard, a notorious criminal mastermind. However, Bluebeard is already aware of the plot against him and has dispatched his own agents to capture Jolin. One day, while being followed by two mysterious men, Jolin receives assistance from a photographer, Lu Hsiao-tung, and the two quickly fall in love. During their relationship, Jolin discovers that Lu is actually an undercover agent working for Bluebeard. One night, while following Bluebeard, Jolin comes face-to-face with Lu, only for Bluebeard to open fire on him. Although Jolin successfully kills Bluebeard, it is too late to save Lu, who dies in her arms.

Chapter Three: The Illusion of Faith

In Bangkok, Jolin receives her latest mission from the secret organization: to infiltrate a powerful crime syndicate and rescue Vince, who was believed to have died years ago in a bombing. To approach the crime lord, Jolin assumes the guise of a nightclub singer and soon discovers that Vince is alive and working undercover within the organization. After their identities are exposed, a shootout ensues. Vince is wounded in the chaos, and Jolin manages to take him back to her apartment, where they reignite their old love. The next day, Vince secretly leaves Jolin and heads to carry out the assassination of the crime lord. Though he succeeds in killing the boss, he is shot in the back. Jolin, realizing that she is being followed by members of the crime syndicate, tries to shake them off while arranging to meet Vince at a designated location. When Vince, gravely injured, arrives at the meeting spot, Jolin desperately attempts to revive him, but he succumbs to his wounds and dies in her arms.

== Cast ==
- Jolin Tsai as Agent J
- Kim Jae-won as Bodyguard S
- Stephen Fung as Lu Hsiao-tung
- Carl Ng as Vince

== Production ==
The film is divided into three chapters, with the cast—featuring Jolin Tsai, Kim Jae-won, Stephen Fung, and Carl Ng—spending one month filming in Paris, London, and Bangkok, respectively. The production had a budget exceeding NT$33 million.

== Soundtrack ==
The film was released in conjunction with Jolin Tsai's 2007 album Agent J. As such, all the songs featured in the movie are from the album. Additionally, while the film's score includes "Neron" from the British label Bruton, all other music in the film is sourced from the British label KPM Music.

Film songs
No.	Title	Lyrics	Music	Producer(s)	Length
1.	"Agent J" (特務J)	Sunny Lee; Matthew Yen; Neoh Kim Hin	Ooi Teng Fong	Adia	3:35
2.	"Alone" (一個人)	Al Kuan	Eric Ng	Paula Ma	4:41
3.	"Fear-Free" (怕什麼)	Cheng Shu-fei	Paul Lee	Paul Lee	4:35
4.	"Ideal State" (桃花源)	Alang Huang	Kaede Chang	Paul Lee	3:32
5.	"Sun Will Never Set" (日不落)	Luke Tsui	Alexander Bard; Anders Hansson	Michael Lin	3:48
6.	"Metronome" (節拍器)	Jolin Tsai	Jamie Hsueh	Derek Lin	4:38
7.	"Golden Triangle" (金三角)	Issac Chen	Nik Quang; Lars Quang; RnG; Thea Hall	Lars Quang; Nik Quang; RnG	3:02
8.	"Tacit Violence" (冷·暴力)	Issac Chen; Howard Chiang; Sunny Lee	Nik Quang; Thea Hall; Lars Quang; RnG	Lars Quang; Nik Quang; RnG	3:01
9.	"Priceless" (非賣品)	Gino Chen; Ang Swee Giap; Tam Jung Chen	Tam Jung Chen	Michael Lin	4:33
Total length:					35:25

Film scores
No.	Title	Writer(s)	Length
1.	"Running Battle"	Lorne David Roderick Balfe	2:03
2.	"Neron"	Inon I Zur	1:36
3.	"Men of Steel"	Rupert William Gregson Williams; Lorne David Roderick Balfe	0:58
4.	"The Urban Machine"	Alastair John King	3:55
5.	"Soul Saver"	Aaron Frederick Laszlo Wheeler	2:52
6.	"Fading Light"	Alistair Hawkins; Paul Louis Reeves	4:24
7.	"Alien"	Mark Revell	1:00
8.	"The Beast Is Tamed"	Richard Myhill	0:30
9.	"Race for Survival"	Tony Clarke	1:28
10.	"Cool Killer"	Joe Henson	1:33
11.	"Masked Diva"	Laurie James Burgess; Paul Martin Pritchard; Amar Lal Nagi	3:17
12.	"Adiós Al Amor"	David Savcic	3:02
13.	"Un Amor Asi"	Luis Rios	3:42
14.	"Still Life"	Rupert William Gregson Williams; Lorne David Roderick Balfe	1:00
15.	"Hear You Breathing"	Stuart Alexander Reid	3:28
16.	"It's Over"	Steve Baker; Carmen Daye	2:32
Total length:			37:20

== Promotion and release ==
On August 27, 2007, EMI released the trailer for Agent J's first chapter, "The Fate of Agent". On September 3, 2007 EMI released the trailer for the second chapter, "The Crack of Memory". The following day, September 4, the trailer for the third chapter, "The Illusion of Faith", was released On September 5, 2007, EMI held a film preview session for the film in Taipei, Taiwan. On September 13, 2007, EMI released a 12-minute highlight reel of the film. The next day, September 14, Tsai hosted the film's premiere in Taipei. On September 20, 2007, she held a 2-minute highlight reel launch event in Taipei, which was broadcast across 58 TV stations, radio stations, and new media outlets in Taiwan. Two days later, on September 22, Tsai hosted a special screening of the film in Tamsui, Taiwan.

The film was released alongside Jolin Tsai's 2007 album Agent J and was not formally shown in theaters. However, the complete film was included in the limited edition of the album, which was released on September 21, 2007.

== Critical reception ==
Tom.com's critic Mi San commented: "The Agent J trilogy includes a plethora of sensational elements designed to captivate large audiences: male and female secret agents, bodyguards, foreign mafias, assassinations by various crime lords, gunfights, pole dancing, aerial silk acrobatics, human experiments, churches, prisons, prisoners, lesbian themes, car chases, drug trafficking, musical performances, and intimate scenes… A Hollywood blockbuster would rarely feature so much in a single film. However, much like reciting lyrics out of context as poetry, which often comes across as absurd, if viewed individually, the trilogy falls short of praise. The film allocates too much time to spectacle and emotional manipulation, while crucial character development and narrative progression are glossed over in a superficial manner. The disconnect between the music and the film is also evident. While the album features a variety of songs reflecting different aspects of Jolin Tsai's character, the film hastily attempts to unify them, lacking proper transitions, making Agent J feel fragmented. Moreover, using the album's tracks as the film's score often overpowers the atmosphere. In many instances, subtle background music—such as orchestral strings, electronic sounds, or ambient effects—would have been more fitting than Jolin Tsai's vocal performances."

== Censorship ==
The film was rated M18 (Mature 18) by Singapore's film classification system, primarily due to a 3-second lesbian kiss featured in the second part of the trilogy, "The Crack of Memory". Chen Xiangyun, Manager of the Chinese Department at EMI Singapore, stated: "The film can be screened in Singapore unless we agree to allow the removal of certain scenes. However, every scene plays a crucial role in advancing the plot. It's like how Lust, Caution lost its impact when overly censored."

Due to the inclusion of the word "Agent" in the title, which is considered a sensitive term, and the film's sexual content, the film was banned from public screening in Mainland China.

In Thailand, the film was restricted from release under the justification of "protecting local culture and resisting the overwhelming influence of foreign culture", thus preventing it from being publicly shown in the country.
