= Carl Ng =

Chinese actor and model from Hong Kong

- Chinese: 吳嘉龍
- Born: 27 March 1976 (age 50); British Hong Kong
- Other names: Carl Ng Ka-Lung, Carl Wu, Wu Jia Long
- Education: University of Westminster
- Occupations: Actor; model
- Years active: 2000–present
- Parents: Richard Ng (father); Susan Ng (mother)

Carl Ng (吳嘉龍; born 27 March 1976) is a Hong Kong actor and model.

== Early life ==
The third of four children, Ng was born in Hong Kong and is of mixed ethnicity of half English and half Chinese. His mother is Susan Ng, a British woman, worked as a hair stylist for Bruce Lee in the 1970s. His father is comedy actor Richard Ng. At the age of 12, he moved with his family to live in England, where he would remain for the next thirteen years.

== Education ==
Ng was educated at Frensham Heights School, a boarding and day independent school in the town of Farnham in Surrey. As a child, he had no desire to become an actor like his father, but while studying global corporate strategy at the University of Westminster he began attending evening drama classes at the Tony Grecos Acting Studio.

== Career ==
After graduating, Ng took up acting full-time, working as a waiter and cook in various restaurants until he started gaining roles in West End and off West End plays. However, he became dissatisfied with the work he was getting, saying: "I was seen as neither Asian nor Caucasian. Either that or I'm cast in stereotyped roles." In 2002, Ng took a six-month break from acting, working as a scuba diving instructor in Thailand.

He then moved back to Hong Kong, where he again waited on tables before landing a number of prominent modelling jobs, featuring in advertisements for Motorola and Sony MiniDisc. Since 2000 he has appeared in a number of films, including Heat Team, Yesterday Once More, Colour Blossoms, and Half Twin. Regarding his choice in film roles, Ng has said: "I do gravitate towards darker roles, roles that other people hesitate to touch. I find them intriguing and an opportunity to try something different." He has appeared alongside his father in several productions, including the 2008 TV film Pulau Hantu.

Ng became well known in Singapore for his role as DSP Glenn in MediaCorp Channel 5's Point of Entry. From Season 4 onwards, he was replaced in the part by Jack Yang.

In 2010, Ng was cast in the lead role of a biographical film based on the life of Cheng Guorong, aka "Brother Sharp", a Chinese man who became a minor celebrity while living homeless on the streets of Ningbo after pictures of him were posted online. The film was due to start production in September 2010.

== Charity work ==
Ng has been involved with a number of AIDS benefits. While working in London he took part in a production of Elegies for Angels, Punks and Raging Queens, the proceeds from which were given to a local AIDS centre. As of 2006, Ng was doing volunteer work at events with the Society for AIDS Care in Hong Kong, as well as a teen support group that deals with topics such as safe sex.

== Filmography ==
- Sausalito (2000)
- Jiang Hu: The Triad Zone (2000)
- Lemon Crush (2002)
- Naked Weapon (2002, uncredited)
- The Medallion (2003)
- Colour of the Truth (2003)
- Fear of Intimacy (2004)
- Legend of the Dragon (2004)
- Love Battlefield (2004)
- Love on the Rocks (2004)
- Heat Team, aka Ambush (2004)
- Butterfly (2004)
- New Police Story (2004)
- Yesterday Once More (2004)
- Colour Blossoms (2004)
- Taped (2005)
- Set to Kill (2005)
- Midnight Running (2006)
- Half Twin (2006)
- Undying Heart (2006)
- Men Suddenly in Black 2 (2006)
- Heavenly Mission (2006)
- Magazine Gap Road (2007)
- Happy Birthday (2007)
- Shadow of Pleasure (2007)
- Boarding Gate (2007)
- Single Blog (2007)
- Hooked on You (2007)
- The Counting House (2007)
- Agent J (2007)
- I Come with the Rain (2008)
- A Decade of Love (2008)
- Pulau Hantu (2008, TV)
- Bodyguard: A New Beginning (2008)
- Sayang Sayang (2009, TV)
- Here Comes Fortune (2010)
- La Comédie Humaine (2010)
- Host of Cooking Mama Ep 28 – 65 (2010, Cooking program of Hong Kong now TV )
- Diago (2010)
- Jessica Caught on Tape (2010)
- Forget Me Not (2010)
- Point of Entry (2010, TV)
- Point of Entry 2 (2011, TV)
- The Viral Factor (2012)
- Point of Entry 3 (2012, TV)
- Triad (2012)
- Kick Ass Girls (2013)
- The Mercury Factor (2013)
- The Man with the Iron Fists 2 (2015)
- Elite Brigade III (2015) (TV)
- Paris Holiday (2015)
- P.I (2016)
- Meow (2017)
- Project Gutenberg (2018)
- A Lifetime Treasure (2019)
- The Invincible Dragon (2019)
- Sons of the Neon Night (2019)
- Walk with Me (2019)
- Peg O' My Heart (2024)
