= J1 Live Concert =

2005 live video album by Jolin Tsai

- Standard edition cover

Live album by Jolin Tsai
- Released: September 23, 2005
- Recorded: November 20, 2004
- Venue: Chungshan Soccer Stadium (Taipei, Taiwan)
- Genre: Pop
- Length: 3:08:34
- Label: Sony BMG

Jolin Tsai chronology
J-Game (2005)	J1 Live Concert (2005)	J-Top (2006)

J1 Live Concert (Chinese: J1演唱會 影音全記錄) is a live video album by Taiwanese singer Jolin Tsai, released by Sony BMG on September 23, 2005. The album features live footage from Tsai's J1 World Tour concert, held on November 20, 2004, at Chungshan Soccer Stadium in Taipei, along with one new song.

The album topped the weekly video album sales chart of G-Music in Taiwan for 12 consecutive weeks and was ranked number 1one on G-Music's 2005 annual video album sales chart.

== Background ==
On July 8, 2004, Tsai announced that she would launch her first concert tour, the J1 World Tour, on August 7 at Hongkou Football Stadium in Shanghai, China. On December 15, 2004, media reports revealed that she was planning to release a live video album for the tour, scheduled for release by the end of that year or early the next. The album was filmed using HDTV technology and sent to Japan for post-production. However, her joint performance with Jay Chou might not be included due to contractual disputes between the two parties.

== Release ==
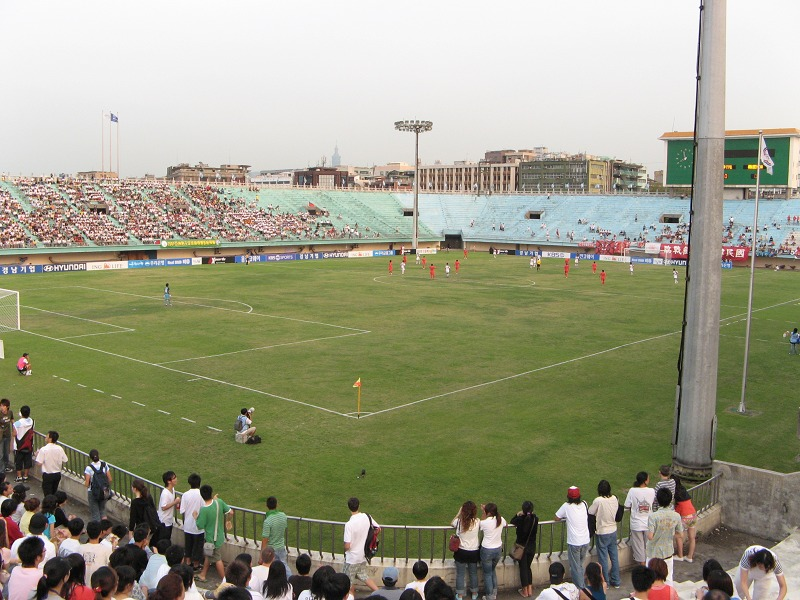
The album features Tsai's live performance at Chungshan Soccer Stadium in Taipei, Taiwan.

On September 13, 2005, Sony BMG announced that the live video album J1 Live Concert would be released on September 23. The album features Tsai's live performance from the J1 World Tour concert held on November 20, 2004, at Chungshan Soccer Stadium in Taipei, along with one new song titled "Paradise". It was the first live video album by a Chinese singer to be produced using HDTV and Dolby Digital 5.1 surround sound technology. The song "Paradise" is a Chinese adaptation of Jem's "They" and was also used in a Motorola commercial. On October 19, 2005, Tsai released the music video for "Paradise", co-directed by Marlboro Lai and Bill Chia.

On December 20, 2005, media reported that Tsai's contract with Sony BMG had actually expired in February of that year, but she had continued to actively support the label's promotional efforts despite not being under contract.

== Commercial performance ==
The album topped the weekly video album sales charts of both G-Music and Five Music in Taiwan, holding the number one position for 12 consecutive weeks on G-Music and 5 consecutive weeks on Five Music. It was also ranked number one on Five Music's annual video album sales chart for 2005.

== Critical reception ==
Shu Wa of Tencent Entertainment noted that it was relatively rare in the Taiwanese market for a live concert to be released as a physical album. Although the J1 Live Concert album includes only 16 tracks and does not present the full concert performance, the remaining songs were later included in subsequent compilation albums. Given that there were only two live shows at the time, this live album effectively catered to fans who were unable to attend in person. As a result, the incomplete tracklist did not negatively impact its commercial performance.

== Track listing ==
J1 Live Concert – Standard edition (CD 1)
No.	Title	Lyrics	Music	Producer(s)	Length
1.	"Paradise" (樂園)	Issac Chen	Jemma Griffiths; Gerard B. Young Jr.; Johann Sebastian Bach; Ward Swingle	Jamie Hsueh	3:14
2.	"Intro"				5:26
3.	"The Spirit of Knight" / "Pirates" / "Magic"	Jolin Tsai; Issac Chen	Jay Chou; Edward Chan; Charles Lee		11:59
4.	"The Starter"	Jolin Tsai	Jamie Hsueh		4:40
5.	"The Smell of Lemon Grass"	Francis Lee	Peter Lee		4:50
6.	"It's Love"	Simon Liang	Jay Chou		4:22
7.	"Prove It"	Kevin Yi	George Samuelson; Michael Lundh; Quint Starkie; Allan Rich		4:56
8.	"Love Love Love"	Simon Liang	Konstantin Meladze		3:58
Total length:					43:25

J1 Live Concert – Standard edition (CD 2)
No.	Title	Lyrics	Music	Length
1.	"Be You for a Day" / "Slave Ship" / "Disappearing Castle"	Francis Lee; Issac Chen; Kevin Yi	Jamie Hsueh; Alex Chang Jien	7:18
2.	"Fake Confess"	Francis Lee	Paul Lee	4:03
3.	"Nice Cat"	Issac Chen	Anna Lidner; Charles Kwashie Tamakloe	3:51
4.	"Priority"	Francis Lee	Dawn Joseph; Henry Gorman	5:47
5.	"36 Tricks of Love" / "Smell of the Popcorn" / "Signature Gesture"	Kiki Hu; Vincent Fang; Issac Chen	Savan Kotecha; Andrew Frampton; Wayne Wilkins; Wan Chiu; Edward Chan; Charles Lee	9:55
6.	"Say Love You"	Simon Liang	Jay Chou	5:56
7.	"Rewind"	Vincent Fang	Jay Chou	2:01
8.	"Outro"			2:32
Total length:				41:23

J1 Live Concert – Standard edition (DVD)
No.	Title	Lyrics	Music	Length
1.	"Intro"			5:26
2.	"The Spirit of Knight" / "Pirates" / "Magic"	Jolin Tsai; Issac Chen	Jay Chou; Edward Chan; Charles Lee	11:59
3.	"The Starter"	Jolin Tsai	Jamie Hsueh	4:40
4.	"The Smell of Lemon Grass"	Francis Lee	Peter Lee	4:50
5.	"It's Love"	Simon Liang	Jay Chou	4:22
6.	"Prove It"	Kevin Yi	George Samuelson; Michael Lundh; Quint Starkie; Allan Rich	4:56
7.	"Love Love Love"	Simon Liang	Konstantin Meladze	3:58
8.	"Be You for a Day" / "Slave Ship" / "Disappearing Castle"	Francis Lee; Issac Chen; Kevin Yi	Jamie Hsueh; Alex Chang Jien	7:18
9.	"Fake Confess"	Francis Lee	Paul Lee	4:03
10.	"Nice Cat"	Issac Chen	Anna Lidner; Charles Kwashie Tamakloe	3:51
11.	"Priority"	Francis Lee	Dawn Joseph; Henry Gorman	5:47
12.	"36 Tricks of Love" / "Smell of the Popcorn" / "Signature Gesture"	Kiki Hu; Vincent Fang; Issac Chen	Savan Kotecha; Andrew Frampton; Wayne Wilkins; Wan Chiu; Edward Chan; Charles Lee	9:55
13.	"Say Love You"	Simon Liang	Jay Chou	5:56
14.	"Rewind"	Vincent Fang	Jay Chou	2:01
15.	"Outro"			2:32
16.	"Jolin's Secret Feature"			13:13
17.	"Jolin's Talk"			8:59
Total length:				1:43:46

== Release history ==
Region	Date	Format(s)	Edition(s)	Distributor
Various	September 23, 2005	Streaming	Standard	Sony BMG
China	September 23, 2005	CD	Standard	GSM
China	September 23, 2005	DVD	Standard; limited	GSM
China	September 23, 2005	2VCD	Standard	GSM
Hong Kong	September 23, 2005	2CD+DVD	Standard	Sony BMG
Hong Kong	October 25, 2005	CD	CD	Sony BMG
Hong Kong	October 25, 2005	DVD	DVD	Sony BMG
Taiwan	September 23, 2005	2CD+DVD	Standard	Sony BMG
Taiwan	October 25, 2005	CD	CD edition	Sony BMG
Taiwan	October 25, 2005	DVD	DVD edition	Sony BMG
