= Hi Working Girl =

2003 Taiwanese television series

- Chinese: Hi 上班女郎
- Hanyu Pinyin: Hi shàng bān nǚ láng
- Genre: Romance; Comedy
- Based on: Asakura-kun Chotto! by: Kenichi Oishi; Yumemi Ishiduka
- Written by: Angie Chai; Wu I-jan; Wen Yu-fang; Mao Hsun-jung
- Directed by: Huang Ke-i; Wu Ssu-ta
- Starring: Jolin Tsai; Show Lo; Megan Lai; Wen Wen
- Opening theme: "Say Love You" by Jolin Tsai
- Ending theme: "You Say Yours I Say Mine" by Show Lo
- Country of origin: Taiwan
- Original language: Mandarin
- No. of episodes: 23

Production
- Executive producer: Lo Shih-hsuan
- Producers: Angie Chai; Yang Chia-yu
- Production location: Taiwan
- Cinematography: Chen Kuo-lung; Hoardmart Production
- Editors: Lin Shih-wan; Chen Hui-yin
- Running time: 45 minutes
- Production companies: Comic Ritz Productions; Nan Fang Film Productions

Original release
- Network: CTV
- Release: March 19 – August 27, 2003

Hi Working Girl (Chinese: Hi 上班女郎) is a 2003 Taiwanese romantic comedy television series directed by Huang Ke-i and Wu Ssu-ta and starring Jolin Tsai and Show Lo. The series premiered on CTV on March 19, 2003. It is based on the Japanese comic series Asakura-kun Chotto! (Japanese: 朝倉くんちょっと！) created by Kenichi Oishi and Yumemi Ishiduka, and it tells the story of what happened after Fu I-ling, a staff of the general affairs department of an advertising company, met Cheng Ta-lun, the chief of the department.

== Plot ==
Fu I-ling (Jolin Tsai) is a pure and innocent girl. She firmly believes that human nature is inherently good, and she believes that there is nothing that cannot be solved in this world. With her "housewife" personality, it is perfect for her to work in the company's general affairs department. But other colleagues in the general affairs department are all weirdos, including a supervisor who likes to scold others, a money digger who loves vanity, and a senior who just wants to marry herself all day long. They all like to bully I-ling and push work to her, but I-ling never complained. She feels that she must be not smart or hard enough. She believes that work and censure are a kind of training and a necessary process in her life.

Until one day the appearance of Cheng Ta-lun (Show Lo) changed I-ling's life. Ta-lun saw I-ling's cuteness and strengths, and while he becomes the driving force for I-ling to come to work every day, he is also deeply attracted by I-ling. But the innocent I-ling never thought that she would be favored by Ta-lun, she just hopes that she would be supremely happy to watch Ta-lun silently by his side every day. Even Ta-lun summoned up the courage to show his love, but I-ling, who is a love idiot, couldn't feel it. Ta-lun could only continue to be entangled by the other two girls.

With Ta-lun's support, I-ling shows her enthusiasm as a "housewife" to the fullest. She helped bald clients find confidence, coordinated the infighting among company's executives, and accompanied the boss of a candy company on a Valentine's Day trip, helped a colleague find a ring in the elevator, signed an impossible contract, found a missing advertising star, etc. All kinds of impossible tasks are solved one by one by I-ling, and it is all up to her perseverance, stupidity, and hard work. This not only made I-ling more popular in the company and her life more fulfilling, but also made Ta-lun like her more and fell in love with her deeply.

But I-ling is not brave in the face of her love. She doesn't believe that Ta-lun will like her the ordinary girl, so she lets the opportunities pass by her side again and again, until one day she realizes that Ta-lun is about to leave her if she can't seize the opportunity, so she finally musters up the courage to say "I love Ta-lun".

== Cast ==
- Jolin Tsai as Fu I-ling
- Show Lo as Cheng Ta-lun
- Megan Lai as Tseng Ai-lin
- Wen Wen as Hsia Wei-chi
- Shan Cheng-ju as Chen Liang-kuang
- Renzo Liu as Tou
- Kasai Kenji as Kasai
- Darryl Kuo as Wang Chih-wei
- Kimi Hsia as A Mei
- Fu Lei as Chairman
- Chen Hsien-shih as Fist Master
- I Che-li as Fu I-ling's mother
- Ing Tsai-ling as Cheng Ta-lun's mother
- Lin Mei-hsiu as Chen Liang-kuang's wife
- Andy On as Sun Ta-chieh
- Wang Jen-chien as Li Tien-chueh
- Ken Chu as Ken Chu
- Pink Yang as Ken Chu's girlfriend
- Duncan Chow as Ken Chu's manager
- Hsieh Chi-wen as Chang
- Jason Lee as Che
- Wallace Chung as Johnny
- Hou Ya-fang as Chen Yuan-yuan
- Li Chia-chen as Hotel Lady Boss
- Chang Li-wei as Li Yu-chun
- Yuki Hsu as Li Hsiao-in
- Penny Lin as Cheng Ta-li
- Lei Wei-yuan as Fu I-ling's father
- Hsu Kuei-in as Fu I-li
- Gigi Lin as Sun Ta-chieh's sister
- Terry Lin as Chun Chieh
- Eddie Hsu as A Tuo
- Chang Chi-hui as Chia Chia
- Chen Yen-an as Wu Ya-hui
- Kuo Chang-ju as Cheng Ta-lun's grandfather

== Soundtracks ==
No.	Title	Lyrics	Music	Performer	Length
1.	"Say Love You" (說愛你)	Simon Liang	Jay Chou	Jolin Tsai	3:46
2.	"You Say Yours I Say Mine" (妳說妳的我說我的)	Vivian Hsu	Show Lo	Show Lo	3:37
3.	"Prague Square" (布拉格廣場)	Vincent Fang	Jay Chou	Jolin Tsai	4:54
4.	"Slave Ship" (奴隸船)	Issac Chen	Jamie Hsueh	Jolin Tsai	4:56

== Release ==
Beginning on March 19, 2003, the series aired one episode per week in Taiwan on CTV. Beginning on May 12, 2004, it aired one episode per week in Hong Kong on Family Entertainment Channel. Beginning on October 1, 2006, it aired three episodes per day in China on CCTV-1. In addition, the series was released in the formats of DVD and VCD in Taiwan, Hong Kong, Singapore, and Malaysia.

== Critical reception ==
Yangzhou Evening News commented: "Hi Working Girl is a typical Taiwanese humor, which seems a little nonsensical, but it makes sense when you think about it carefully. Such a television series with simple relationships between characters makes people feel very relaxed, each character has a distinctive personality and is easy to remember." Sina Entertainment commented: "Hi Working Girl not only won the audience a relaxed smile with slightly exaggerated performance and plot, but also implies a very realistic story. The reason is that it does not use the way of preaching, but shows it to the audience in such a way hidden behind the laughter." Bandao Metropolis Daily commented: "Because Jolin Tsai seldom appears in television series and movies, and she has intimate scenes with her rumored boyfriend Show Lo in the series, it still attracted a lot of attention from fans. But for Jolin Tsai, acting skills are undoubtedly her 'weak point'. Jolin Tsai, who is proficient in singing and dancing, shows her hands are tied when facing the filming camera."
