= J1 World Tour =

2004–2006 concert tour by Jolin Tsai

- World tour by Jolin Tsai
- Location: Asia; North America
- Associated album: Magic; Castle
- Start date: August 7, 2004
- End date: April 22, 2006
- Legs: 3
- No. of shows: 8

Jolin Tsai concert chronology
- J1 World Tour (2004–2006); Dancing Forever World Tour (2006–2009)

The J1 World Tour (Chinese: J1世界巡迴演唱會) was the first concert tour by Taiwanese singer Jolin Tsai. It began on August 7, 2004, at the Hongkou Football Stadium in Shanghai, China, and concluded on April 22, 2006, at the Bren Events Center in Irvine, United States. Spanning one year and nine months, the tour featured eight shows across seven cities worldwide.

== Background ==
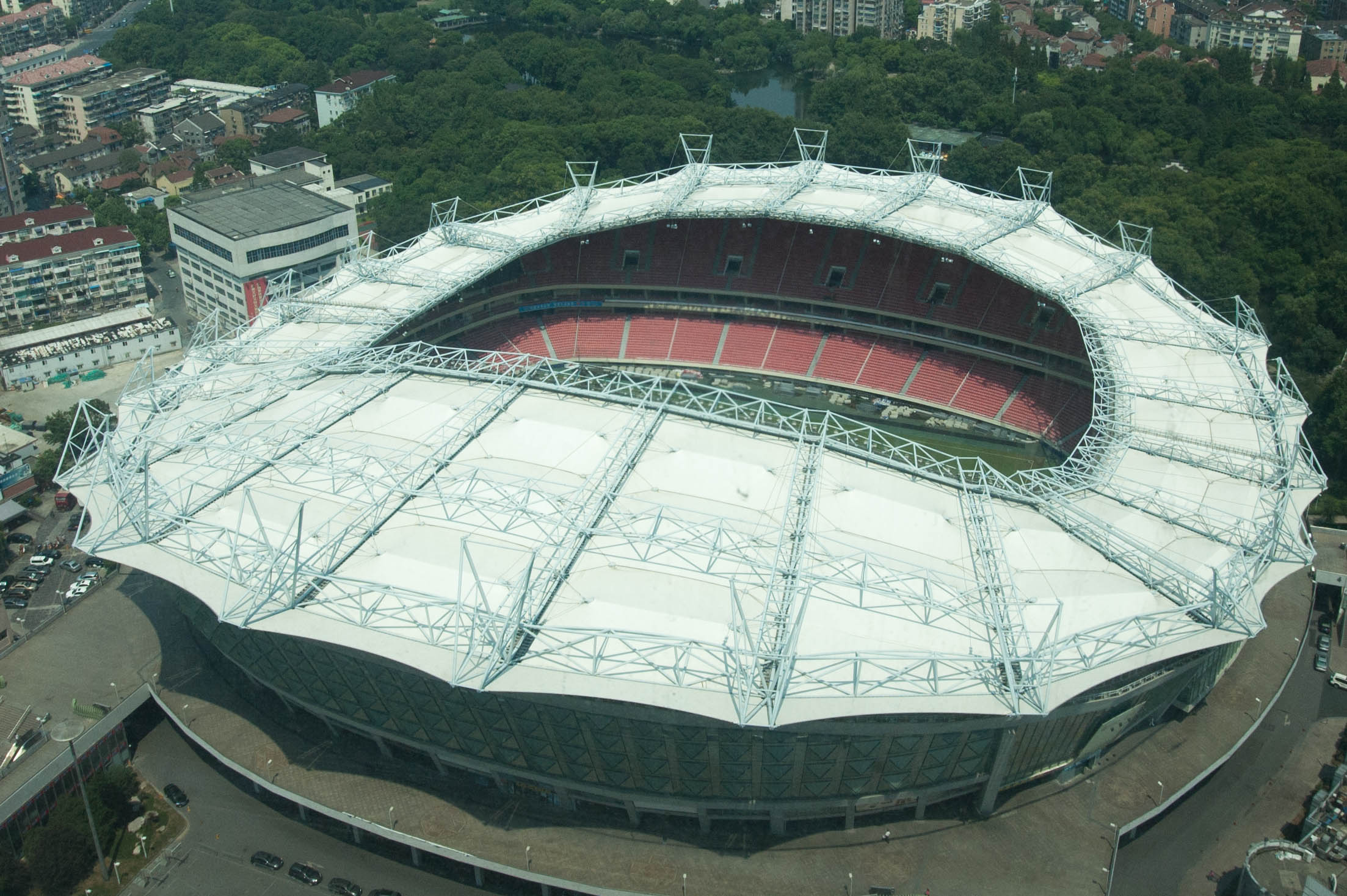
The tour kicked off at Hongkou Football Stadium in Shanghai, China.

On February 27, 2004, Tsai released her sixth studio album, Castle, and revealed plans to launch a concert tour following the album's promotional period. On July 8, 2004, she officially announced that her first concert tour, the J1 World Tour, would kick off on August 7 at the Hongkou Football Stadium in Shanghai, China. Tsai explained that Shanghai, being a major international city in China, was chosen as the starting point of the tour to symbolize her ambition to expand into the global market. She also shared that the tour's name, "J1", signifies her debut concert, with future tours potentially being named sequentially as J2, J3, J4, and so on.

== Production ==
The Shanghai show of the tour featured a stage design inspired by the concept of the "Moonlight Treasure Box". A total of NT$30 million was invested in props, costumes, dancers, and musicians. The organizers spent over NT$5 million on five large-scale custom-designed props, including a giant crystal chandelier worth HK$300,000, and an LED color-changing elevator worth HK$220,000, which shifted colors in sync with the music. Other standout elements included a hydraulic iridescent shell that transformed Tsai into a mermaid, a high-altitude swing that lifted her three stories into the air, and a 360-degree spherical projector capable of displaying animations and photos across its entire surface.

The wardrobe for the Shanghai performance alone cost HK$400,000 and featured designs such as "Space Princess", "Mermaid Princess", "Futuristic Warrior", "Tropical Queen", and "Dance Diva", each meticulously handcrafted. One particularly notable outfit was a pair of diamond-embellished tights adorned with over 8,000 rhinestones on sheer fabric. Hairstyles, makeup, and footwear were all tailored to match each costume, making the quick changes complex and labor-intensive. To ensure the highest quality vocal performance, the organizers imported the latest headset microphone technology from the United States, providing precise audio capture that enhanced both Tsai's vocal delivery and her confident stage presence.

For the Taipei show, a total of NT$30 million was invested in stage design, hardware, lighting, and costumes. A Broadway-style stage alone cost NT$12 million to build. The design included ten themed scenes featuring elements like European-style pole lamps, sofas, ballet barres, and full-length mirrors. A 200-meter runway extended into the audience, and the secondary stage could elevate to a height equivalent to three stories. The main stage was equipped with ten large LCD screens, thirty sets of special effects and animations, and a comprehensive lighting and sound system, all contributing to a total production cost of over NT$6 million. Six costume sets for the Taipei show were crafted at a cost of NT$3 million and showcased styles influenced by Middle Eastern, Roman, and Spanish flamenco fashion. Other outfits included a modified pirate costume, a yellow and white chiffon ensemble, a black seductive outfit, a fur-capped blue-white-red costume, and a gold hip-hop look.

The Beijing performance featured a 360-degree stage design under the theme "Diamond Base". At the center stood a massive crystal chandelier, which served as a dramatic entrance device, lowering Tsai from the ceiling. A diamond-shaped rotating lift platform was also a key feature of the stage.

== Concert synopsis ==
At the Shanghai show, Tsai made a dramatic entrance by standing atop a crystal chandelier while performing "Prove It", dressed in rhinestone-embellished tights. Throughout the concert, she transformed into both a mermaid princess and a sultry catwoman, showcasing two distinctly different styles. In addition to performing hits from her Sony Music era—such as "36 Tricks of Love", "Pirates", and "Fake Confess"—she also included tracks from her time with Universal. Songs like "Don't Stop" and "I Know You're Feeling Blue" sparked massive singalongs from the audience. The concert concluded with a powerful performance of "Magic".

The Taipei concert opened to the sound of drums, with Tsai rising from the secondary stage in a dazzling rhinestone outfit, striking a pose with her right leg lifted high. She then performed a series of advanced yoga poses before making her way down the extended runway to the main stage, where she opened with "The Spirit of Knight", followed by "Pirates" and "Magic". She continued with "The Starter" and "The Smell of Lemon Grass", performing beneath a rising J-shaped chandelier. During "Prove It", guest performer Show Lo made a surprise appearance to dance alongside her. Tsai then performed "Love Love Love", featuring dramatic lifts and flips with her dancers. Taking on the role of a catwoman, she delivered a playful rendition of "Good Cat", complete with feline-inspired dance moves. The setlist continued with "36 Tricks of Love", "Smell of the Popcorn", and "Signature Gesture", as well as several dance hits from her Universal era, including "Show Your Love", "You Gotta Know", and "Don't Stop". As the concert neared its end, she performed "Say Love You". During the encore, Tsai sang "Rewind", and was joined by Jay Chou for a duet during the chorus. The pair also performed a dance routine together, ending the concert with a heartfelt duet of "Prague Square", bringing the evening to a memorable close.

== Recording ==
On September 13, 2005, Sony BMG announced the release of the live video album for Tsai's world tour, titled J1 Live Concert, which would be available on September 23, 2005. The album features footage from her performance held on November 20, 2004, at Chungshan Football Stadium in Taipei, Taiwan, and includes one new track titled "Paradise". This release marked the first live video album by a Chinese-language artist to utilize HDTV and Dolby Digital 5.1 surround sound technology.

== Set list ==
August 7, 2004
1. "Prove It"
2. "36 Tricks of Love"
3. "It's Love"
4. "Disappearing Castle"
5. "Love Love Love"
6. "Smell of the Popcorn"
7. "Slave Ship"
8. "Be You for a Day"
9. "Good Thing"
10. "Nice Cat"
11. "Priority"
12. "The Starter"
13. "Fake Confess"
14. "The Smell of Lemon Grass"
15. "Do You Still Love Me"
16. "Can't Speak Clearly"
17. "I Know You're Feeling Blue"
18. "Show Your Love"
19. "You Gotta Know"
20. "Don't Stop"
21. "Prague Square"
22. "The Spirit of Knight"
23. "Pirates"
24. "Say Love You"
25. "Rewind"
26. "Magic"
November 20, 2004—December 11, 2004
1. "The Spirit of Knight"
2. "Pirates"
3. "Magic"
4. "The Starter"
5. "The Smell of Lemon Grass"
6. "It's Love"
7. "Prove It"
8. "Love Love Love"
9. "Be You for a Day"
10. "Slave Ship"
11. "Disappearing Castle"
12. "I'm Still Your Lover"
13. "Cut Love"
14. "Red Bean"
15. "Fake Confess"
16. "Nice Cat"
17. "Priority"
18. "Do You Still Love Me"
19. "Can't Speak Clearly"
20. "What Kind of Love"
21. "I Know You're Feeling Blue"
22. "36 Tricks of Love"
23. "Smell of the Popcorn"
24. "Signature Gesture"
25. "Show Your Love"
26. "You Gotta Know"
27. "Don't Stop"
28. "Say Love You"
29. "Rewind"
30. "Prague Square"
31. "Rewind"(Outro)
May 20, 2005—April 22, 2006
1. "The Spirit of Knight"
2. "Pirates"
3. "Magic"
4. "The Starter"
5. "The Smell of Lemon Grass"
6. "It's Love"
7. "Prove It"
8. "Love Love Love"
9. "Sky"
10. "I'm Still Your Love"
11. "Cut Love"
12. "Red Bean"
13. "Fake Confess"
14. "Nice Cat"
15. "Overlooking Purposely"
16. "Do You Still Love Me"
17. "What Kind of Love"
18. "I Know You're Feeling Blue"
19. "J-Game"
20. "36 Tricks of Love"
21. "Signature Gesture"
22. "Show Your Love"
23. "You Gotta Know"
24. "Don't Stop"
25. "Say Love You"
26. "Rewind"
27. "Prague Square"
28. "Rewind"(Outro)
Notes
- During the concert in Shanghai, Jerry Yan performed "One Meter" and "I Love You with All My Heart", and Edison Chen performed "I Never Told You".
- During the concert in Taipei, Show Lo performed "Robotic Doll", Tsai performed "Aren't They All Our Children" with Ronald McDonald and 25 children, and Tsai performance "Rewind" and "Prague Square" with Jay Chou.
- During the concert in Beijing, Vanness Wu performed "Who Made You Cry" and "Lonely Square".
- During the concert in Singapore, Sylvester Sim performed "Katrina", "Silence", "So", and "My Trouble", and Yida Huang performed "Blue Sky", "Anonymous Baby", and "Love Under the Microscope".
- During the concerts in Genting Highlands, Show Lo performed "Love Expert" and "Robotic Doll", and Tsai performed "Rewind" and "Prague Square" with Show Lo.
- During the concert in Irvine, Tsai performed "Rewind" and "Prague Square" with Show Lo.

== Shows ==
List of concert dates
Date	City	Country	Venue	Attendance
August 7, 2004	Shanghai	China	Hongkou Football Stadium	35,000
November 20, 2004	Taipei	Taiwan	Chungshan Soccer Stadium	30,000
December 4, 2004	Beijing	China	Workers Indoor Arena	Unknown
December 11, 2004	Singapore		Singapore Indoor Stadium	Unknown
May 20, 2005	Genting Highlands	Malaysia	Arena of Stars	8,000
May 21, 2005	Genting Highlands	Malaysia	Arena of Stars	8,000
April 16, 2006	Atlantic City	United States	Etess Arena	Unknown
April 22, 2006	Irvine	United States	Bren Events Center	5,000
