= Rainie Yang discography =

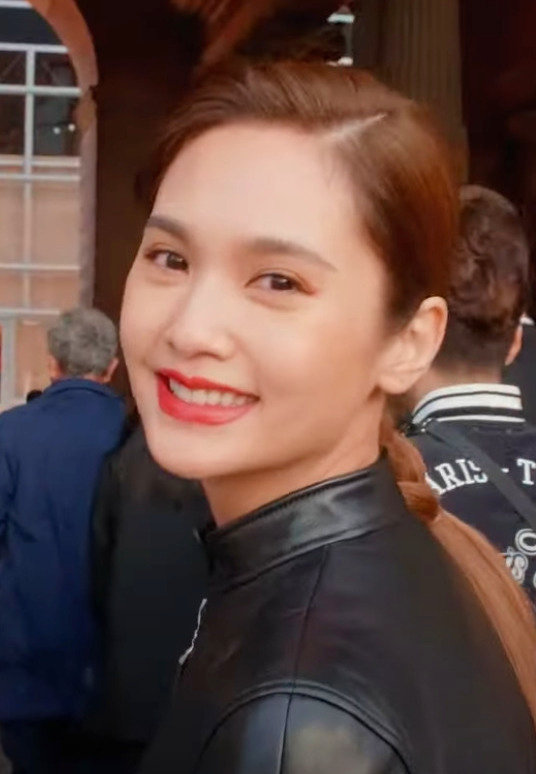
- Yang at Paris Fashion Week in 2019
- Studio albums: 12
- Compilation albums: 2
- Live albums: 2

The discography of Taiwanese singer Rainie Yang consists of 12 studio albums, 2 compilation albums, and 2 live albums.

== Studio albums ==
List of studio albums, with release date, label, and sales shown
Title	Album details	Peak chart positions	Sales	Certifications
Title	Album details	TWN	Sales	Certifications
My Intuition	Released: 9 September 2005; Label: Sony Music Taiwan; Formats: CD, cassette	1	Asia: 1,000,000; TWN: 160,000	RIT: Platinum
Meeting Love	Released: 17 March 2006; Label: Sony Music Taiwan; Formats: CD, digital download	1	Asia: 1,200,000; TWN: 150,000	
My Other Self	Released: 7 September 2007; Label: Sony Music Taiwan; Formats: CD, digital download	1		
Not Yet a Woman	Released: 7 November 2008; Label: Sony Music Taiwan; Formats: CD, digital download	1		
Rainie & Love...?	Released: 1 January 2010; Label: Sony Music Taiwan; Formats: CD, digital download, streaming	1	TWN: 50,000	
Longing For	Released: 29 July 2011; Label: Sony Music Taiwan; Formats: CD, digital download, streaming	1		
Wishing for Happiness	Released: 17 August 2012; Label: Sony Music Taiwan; Formats: CD, digital download, streaming	1		
Angel Wings	Released: 23 August 2013; Label: Sony Music Taiwan; Formats: CD, digital download, streaming	1		
A Tale of Two Rainie	Released: 12 December 2014; Label: EMI Records Taiwan; Formats: CD, digital download, streaming	1		
Traces of Time in Love	Released: 30 September 2016; Label: EMI Records Taiwan; Formats: CD, digital download, streaming	—		
Delete Reset Grow	Released: 27 November 2019; Label: EMI Records Taiwan; Formats: CD, digital download, streaming	—		
Like a Star	Released: 6 November 2020; Label: EMI Records Taiwan; Formats: CD, digital download, streaming	—		

== Compilation albums ==
Title	Album details
Whimsical World	Released: 23 April 2010; Label: Sony Music Taiwan; Formats: CD, digital download, streaming
Rainie Yang Essential	Released: 12 December 2017; Label: Sony Music Taiwan; Formats: CD, digital download, streaming

== Live albums ==
Title	Album details
10 Years of Rainie, Whimsical World Live	Released: 28 January 2011; Label: Sony Music Taiwan; Formats: CD, digital download, streaming
Love Voyage Concert	Released: 1 February 2013; Label: Sony Music Taiwan; Formats: CD, digital download, streaming

== Singles ==
Title	Year	Peak chart positions	Album
Title	Year	JPN	Album
"My Intuition" (Japanese version)	2010	115	Non-album singles
"Youth Lies Within" (青春住了誰)	2017	—	Non-album singles
"1,001 Wishes" (一千零一個願望 (單人版))	2017	—	Non-album singles
"Lessons in Love" (忘課)	2018	—	Non-album singles
