= Free Gate =

Free Gate may refer to:

- Freegate, an internet software utility
- a song by Rainie Yang on the album My Other Self
