= Whimsical World Collection =

Compilation album by Rainie Yang
- Released: 23 April 2010
- Genre: Mandopop
- Length: 59:00
- Language: Mandarin
- Label: Sony Music Taiwan
- Producer: Jamie Hsueh 薛忠銘

Rainie Yang chronology
Rainie & Love...? 雨愛 (2010)	Whimsical World Collection (2010)	Longing for... 仰望 (2011)

Whimsical World Collection (Chinese: 異想天開; pinyin: Yì xiǎng tiān kāi) is Taiwanese Mandopop artist Rainie Yang's (Chinese: 楊丞琳) first collection album. It was released on 23 April 2010 by Sony Music Taiwan. It has two editions : the Deluxe Edition and the pre-order edition of 3 CDs and a DVD with 3 new tracks, 35 previously released tracks and 15 music videos from her five studio albums

== Track listing ==
=== Disc 1 ===
- 異想天開Yi Xiang Tian Kai (Whimsical)
- 偏食 Pian Shi (One-sided diet)
- 黑色月亮 Hei Se Yue Liang (Black Moon)
- 小茉莉 Xiao Mo Li (Little Jasmine)-theme song spider Lilies
- 摺疊式愛情 Zhe Die Shi Ai Qing (Foldable Love)
- 太煩惱 Tai Fan Nao (Too Much Trouble)-insert song of Miss No Good
- 只想愛你 Zhi Xiang Ai Ni (Just Wanna Love You)
- In your eyes/ feat 羅志祥 Show Lo -insert song of Hi My Sweetheart
- 理想情人 Li Xiang Qing Ren (Ideal Lover)-insert song Devil Beside You
- 不見 Bu Jian (Disappear)
- 甜心咒 Tian Xin Zhou (Sweet Curse)-feat Evan Yo
- 任意門 Ren Yi Men (Magic Door)
- 曖昧(日文版)

=== Disc 2 ===
- 曖昧 Ai Mei (Ambiguous)-ending theme song Devil Beside You
- 可愛 Ke Ai (Cute)
- 單眼皮 Dan Yan Pi (Single Eyelid)
- 狼來了 Lang Lai Le (Wolf Coming)
- 青春鬥 Qing Chun Dou (Youth Bucket)-insert song of Hi My Sweetheart
- 倔強 Jue Qiang (Stubborn)
- 找不到 Zhao Bu Dao (Can't Find It)
- 過敏 Guo Min (Over-Sensitive)-Love gold oath advertisement song
- 我的愛吊點滴 Wo De Ai Diao Dian Di (My Love Drips and Drops)
- 絕對達令 Jue Dui Da Ling (Absolute Darling)
- 冷戰 Leng Zhan (Cold War)
- 你是壞人 Ni Shi Huai Ren (You Are A Bad Guy)
- 雨愛 Yu Ai (Rain Love)-ending theme song ofHi My Sweetheart

=== Disc 3 ===
- 帶我走 Dai Wo Zou (Take Me Away)-ending theme song of Miss No Good
- 幸福節拍 Xing Fu De Jie Pai (Beat Of Happiness)-Darlie Toothpaste advertisement song
- 完美比例 Wan Mei Bi Li (Perfect Proportion)-insert song of Why Why Love
- 缺氧 Que Yang (Lacking Oxygen)-ending theme song of Why Why Love
- 匿名的好友 Ni Ming De Hao You (Anonymous Friend)-insert song of Hi My Sweetheartand theme song of Korean drama Brilliant Legacy
- 左邊 Zuo Bian (On The Left)
- 在你懷裡的微笑 Zai Ni Huai Li De Wei Xiao (In The Arms Of Your Smile)
- 學會 Xue Hui (Learned)
- 慶祝 Qing Zhu (Celebration)
- 下一次微笑 Xia Yi Ci Wei Xiao (Next Time Smiling)
- 遇上愛 Yu Shang Ai (Meeting Love)-CTV Telecomm advertisement song
- 恋の魔法

Ai Mei My Intuition · 2005

Dai Wo Zou Not Yet a Woman · 2008

Li Xiang Qing Ren My Intuition · 2005

Goldfish With Amnesia A Tale of Two Rainie · 2014

Nian Lun Shuo Traces of Time in Love · 2016

Zhi Xiang Ai Ni My Intuition · 2005

The Audience Traces of Time in Love · 2016

Wei Ai Qi Cheng Rainie Yang "Love Voyage" Concert Deluxe Edition · 2013

Ripples A Tale of Two Rainie · 2014

Que Yang My Other Self · 2007

Zuo Bian Meeting Love · 2006

Qing Zhu Meeting Love · 2006
