= 4 in Love =

4 in Love may refer to:

- 4 in Love (group), a girl group from Taiwan
- 4 in Love (album), an album by Cookies, a girl group from Hong Kong
- 4 in Love (TV series), a Hong Kong TVB series starring Moses Chan and Charmaine Sheh
