= The Devil Does Exist =

Japanese manga series

- Cover of the first tankōbon version, first released on July 1, 1999

悪魔で候 (Akuma de Sōrō)
- Genre: Romance
- Manga
- Written by: Mitsuba Takanashi
- Published by: Shueisha
- English publisher: NA: CMX; Shueisha (digital)
- Imprint: Margaret Comics
- Magazine: Bessatsu Margaret
- Original run: January 1999 – August 2002
- Volumes: 11
- See also
- Devil Beside You

The Devil Does Exist (Japanese: 悪魔で候, Hepburn: Akuma de Sōrō) is a Japanese manga series by Mitsuba Takanashi. It was serialized in the monthly shōjo manga magazine Bessatsu Margaret from January 1999 to August 2002.

A Taiwanese live-action television drama adaptation, titled Devil Beside You, was broadcast in 2005.

== Plot ==
Kayano Saito, a shy high school student, attempts to confess her feelings to her crush and captain of the basketball team, Yuichi Kamijo. However, she accidentally gives her love letter to Takeru Edogawa, a rowdy first-year student and the principal's son, who uses it to blackmail her into following his orders. To Kayano, Takeru seems to be the devil himself due to his attractive appearance, popularity, and his constant teasing. Even worse, Kayano's mother, Tokiko, reveals that she plans on marrying Takeru's father, Mamoru, making him inescapable from her life.

As Kayano starts becoming closer to Kamijo, she courageously refuses to obey Takeru's orders. In response, Kayano's love letter is spread around school. Humiliated, Kayano blames Takeru but discovers that Kamijo returns her feelings, and they begin dating. After realizing Takeru's childhood friend, Rika Moroboshi, had spread her letter, Kayano apologizes to Takeru and allows him to hit her to call things even, but he instead kisses her, declaring that he is in love with her. Kayano becomes torn between Takeru and Kamijo, but after Kamijo confronts her, Kayano realizes he is nothing like how she had imagined him to be, and she breaks up with him. She admits to Takeru that she returns his feelings, and they begin dating in secret.

As Kayano and Takeru's relationship deepens, so does Kayano's guilt over them becoming step-siblings. At the same time, obstacles appear to break the two apart, including Rika's unrequited feelings for Takeru, the appearance of Takeru's estranged younger brother Yuzuru, an arranged marriage between Takeru and Rumi Saionji orchestrated by his grandmother, and Kayano's childhood friend, Mr. Fujita, becoming a teacher at their school. In addition to their rivals, as Kayano and Takeru's parents' marriage looms closer and they begin living with each other, the two struggle with keeping their relationship a secret from them. Once Tokiko discovers they are dating, she considers breaking off her engagement with Mamoru to allow Kayano and Takeru to continue their relationship. Overcome with guilt, Kayano convinces her mother to stay with Mamoru. After Tokiko reveals she is pregnant, Mamoru also convinces her to accept Kayano and Takeru's relationship.

When Takeru's mother returns to his life, she offers him to live with her and Yuzuru in Italy for the next two years. Despite the uncertainty of Kayano and Takeru's relationship, the two agree that Takeru should accept the offer in order for him to pursue career opportunities and reconnect with his mother. After two years pass, Takeru returns to Japan, where the two marry.

== Characters ==
Kayano Saito (斉藤 茅乃, Saitō Kayano)
Voiced by: Tomoko Kawakami (drama CD), Ryōko Ono (vomic)
Kayano is a shy second-year student in high school who lives with her widowed mother. Compared to Takeru, she values other people's happiness above her own.
Takeru Edogawa (江戸川 猛, Edogawa Takeru)
Voiced by: Hikaru Midorikawa (drama CD), Tatsuhisa Suzuki (vomic)
Takeru is a first-year high school student in class 8. He is famous at school for being rowdy, and he is also the principal's son. The other characters note that Takeru acts mature for his age and also puts up a strong front to prevent people around him from being hurt. He was inspired by former X Japan member Hide.
Yuichi Kamijo (上条 優一, Kamijō Yūichi)
Voiced by: Wataru Takagi (drama CD), Daisuke Ono (vomic)
Kamijo is a boy in Kayano's class who is also the captain of the basketball team. At the start of the series, Kayano is in love with him, and after he learns of her feelings, he reveals he reciprocates them. However, when he lashes out at Kayano over his jealousy of her relationship with Takeru, Kayano ends up being frightened and realizing that he is not as gentle as she had thought him to be. After she breaks up with him, Kamijo begins dating Haru, one of her best friends.
Kyoko Harukawa (春川 恭子, Harukawa Kyōko)
Voiced by: Michiko Neya (drama CD), Akiko Tanaka
Nicknamed Haru (ハル), she is one of Kayano's best friends. Haru is outspoken and strong-willed. After Kayano breaks up with Kamijo, Haru takes an interest in him and romantically pursues him.
Natsuka Watanabe (渡辺 菜都香, Watanabe Natsuka)
Voiced by: Eriko Kawasaki (drama CD), Kumiko Nakane (vomic)
Nicknamed Natchan (なっちゃん), she is one of Kayano's best friends at school.
Yohei Uozumi (魚住 陽平, Uozumi Yōhei)
Voiced by: Daisuke Sakaguchi (drama CD), Hironari Kumada (vomic)
Yohei is Takeru's childhood friend. When they were in junior high, Yohei was bullied for his weight by the captain of their basketball team, causing Takeru to physically hit him in defense and getting removed from the team. Yohei has been loyal to Takeru since, and he also is in love with Rika, another one of their childhood friends.
Rika Moroboshi (諸星 リカ, Moroboshi Rika)
Voiced by: Yumi Tōma (drama CD), Kazuha Yajima (vomic)
Rika is Takeru and Yohei's childhood friend. She has been in love with Takeru since she was young and resents Kayano. She is willing to use underhanded tactics to gain sympathy from Takeru and becomes one of the managers of the basketball team to get closer to him. However, after realizing Takeru admires Kayano for her honest personality, she decides to give up on him.
Tokiko Saito (斉藤 時子, Saitō Tokiko)
Voiced by: Kikuko Inoue (drama CD), Chiaki Kanō (vomic)
Tokiko is Kayano's 38-year-old mother who is very carefree.
Mamoru Edogawa (江戸川 守, Edogawa Mamoru)
Voiced by: Ryūsuke Ōbayashi (drama CD), Shinsuke Nagashima (vomic)
Mamoru is the principal of the high school and Takeru's father.
Yuzuru Sonokawa (園川 譲, Sonokawa Yuzuru)
Yuzuru is a mysterious, beautiful boy who declares Takeru as his enemy. He attempts to get close to him through Kayano, resorting to threatening to expose their relationship when Kayano turns down his advances. Kayano eventually learns that Yuzuru is a junior high school student and Takeru's estranged younger brother who went to live with their mother after their parents' divorce. Takeru resents Yuzuru for occupying his mother's attention when they were young, but he also blames himself for severely injuring him after he pushed him down the stairs into a vase. Kayano learns that Yuzuru is antagonizing Takeru on purpose to get attention from him, and that he secretly admires him.
Shinnosuke Fujita (藤田 慎之介, Fujita Shinnosuke)
Mr. Fujita is Kayano's childhood friend and a former student of her late father. Kayano used to be in love with him.
Rumi Saionji (西園寺 留美, Saionji Rumi)
Rumi is a girl from a prestigious family with whom Takeru's grandmother sets him up on an arranged marriage. She is docile and gentle. When she meets Takeru, she becomes interested in knowing more about him, even transferring schools and becoming one of the basketball team's managers to get close to him. After realizing he and Kayano are in a relationship, she gives up on him and transfers back to her original high school.
Ichiro Toba (戸葉 一郎, Toba Ichirō)
Voiced by: Kōsuke Okano (drama CD), Jun Konno (vomic)
One of Takeru's friends from class 8.
Junichi Yamamoto (山本 順一, Yamamoto Jun'ichi)
Voiced by: Akira Sasanuma (drama CD), Yoshimasa Hosoya (vomic)
One of Takeru's friends from class 8.
Shin Kanzaki (神埼 真, Kanzaki Shin)
Voiced by: Hiroshi Iida (drama CD), Yoshimasa Kawata (vomic)
One of Takeru's friends from class 8.

== Media ==
=== Manga ===
The Devil Does Exist is written and illustrated by Mitsuba Takanashi. It was serialized in the monthly shōjo manga magazine Bessatsu Margaret from the January 1999 issue to the August 2002 issue. The chapters were later released in eleven bound volumes by Shueisha under the Margaret Comics imprint. The series was re-released in a seven-bunkoban edition in 2008.

In 2004, CMX licensed the manga series for North America distribution in English. It went out of print when DC Comics shut down the CMX imprint in 2010. In 2026, the series became licensed digitally in English on Shueisha's Manga Million platform.

==== Tankōbon editions ====
No.	Original release date	Original ISBN	English release date	English ISBN
1	July 1, 1999	978-4-592-11821-3	March 30, 2005	978-4088470948
2	November 1, 1999	978-4088471457	July 1, 2005	978-1401205461
3	March 1, 2000	978-4088471990	October 1, 2005	978-1401205478
4	July 1, 2000	978-4088472515	January 1, 2006	978-1401205485
5	November 1, 2000	978-4088473079	February 15, 2006	978-1401205492
6	April 1, 2001	978-4088473659	May 1, 2006	978-1401210205
7	August 1, 2001	978-4088474090	August 30, 2006	978-1401210212
8	December 1, 2001	978-4088474564	November 15, 2006	978-1401210229
9	April 25, 2002	978-4088474984	February 21, 2007	978-1401210236
10	July 25, 2002	978-4088475332	May 16, 2007	978-1401210243
11	December 14, 2002	978-4088475837	August 8, 2007	978-1401210250

==== Bunkoban reprint ====
No.	Japanese release date	Japanese ISBN
1	February 15, 2008	978-4-08-618693-3
2	February 15, 2008	978-4-08-618694-0
3	April 18, 2008	978-4-08-618695-7
4	April 18, 2008	978-4-08-618696-4
5	May 16, 2008	978-4-08-618697-1
6	May 16, 2008	978-4-08-618698-8
7	June 18, 2008	978-4-08-618699-5

=== Audio drama ===
An audio drama was released on CD by King Records on August 23, 2000, titled Dangerous Love Wars: The Devil Does Exist.

A vomic (voice comic) adaptation was released on February 29, 2008, on Shueisha's website, S-Cast, to promote the bunkoban reprint of The Devil Does Exist.

=== Other adaptations ===
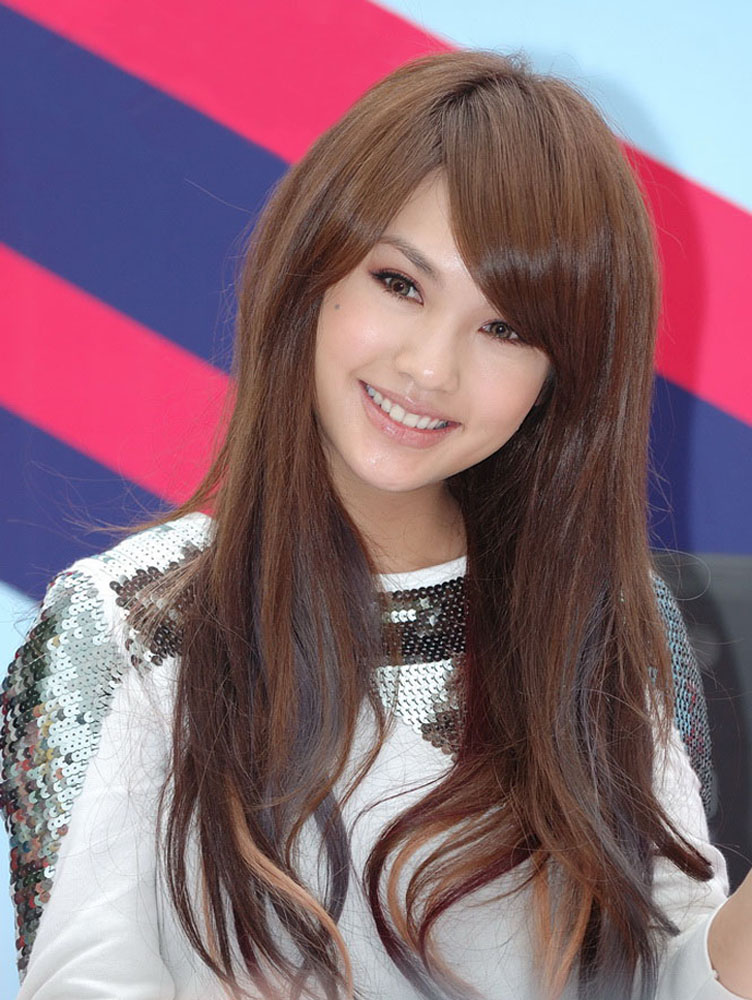
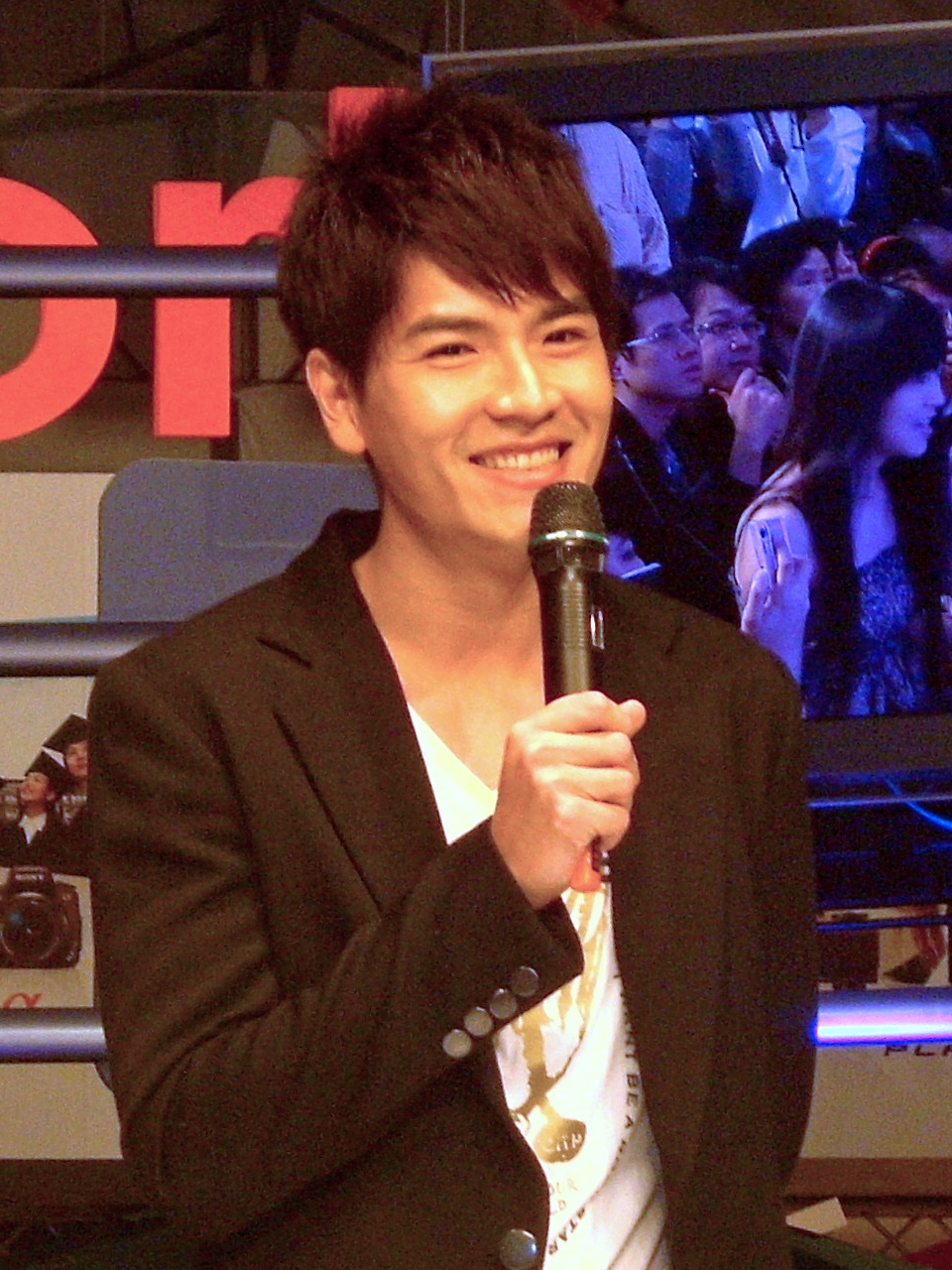
Rainie Yang (pictured in 2010) and Kingone Wang (pictured in 2008) portrayed Qi Yue (Kayano) and Yuan Yi (Kamijo) respectively in the 2005 Taiwanese drama adaptation.

In 2005, The Devil Does Exist was adapted into a 20-episode Taiwanese drama titled Devil Beside You by Comic Field Productions. The drama stars Mike He, Rainie Yang, and Kingone Wang. It was directed by Lin He Lung and was broadcast on CTV from June 26, 2005, to September 18, 2005, and cable TV ETTV. The adaptation saw several changes to the characters and settings, such as being set in college instead of high school and changing the characters' names into Chinese. The opening theme song is "Jerk" by Yida and the ending theme song is "Ai Mei" by Rainie Yang.

== Reception ==
By 2010, The Devil Does Exist had consecutively sold over 3,500,000 physical copies in Japan. Publishers Weekly and AnimeLand praised The Devil Does Exist for its artwork and fashion, but both found the story neither complex nor distinctive. In addition, Publishers Weekly compared the story's premise to Hot Gimmick and described Kayano as "less a character" and "more a prize" towards her love interests.
