= Tick Tock (Beat The Clock) =

2010 song performed by Rainie Yang

"Qing Chun Dou 青春鬥 (Youth Bucket)"

Single by Rainie Yang

from the album Rainie & Love...?
- Released: 1 January 2010
- Recorded: 2009
- Genre: Mandopop
- Length: 2:56
- Label: Sony
- Songwriter(s): Roxanne Seeman; Kine Ludvigsen-Fossheim; Olav Fossheim
- Producer(s): Jamie Hsueh 薛忠銘

Music video
- "Tick Tock (Beat The Clock)" on YouTube

"Koi no Mahō"

Single by Rainie Yang
- Released: 27 January 2010
- Recorded: 2009
- Genre: J-pop
- Length: 2:56
- Label: Sony
- Songwriter(s): Roxanne Seeman; Kine Ludvigsen-Fossheim; Olav Fossheim

Music video
- "Koi no Mahō" ("恋の魔法") [Tick Tock] Japanese version) on YouTube

"Qing Chun Dou" 青春鬥 (Youth Bucket), Chinese title of Tick Tock (Beat The Clock) is a song by Taiwanese singer and actress Rainie Yang, written by Roxanne Seeman, Kine Ludvigsen-Fossheim, and Olav Fossheim. It is the fourth single from Rainie Yang's studio album Rainie & Love...?, released by Sony Music Entertainment on January 1, 2010.

Rainie & Love...? has been certified platinum by Recording Industry Foundation in Taiwan (RIT) with sales of 50,000 units, making it one of Taiwan's best selling albums. The Japanese version "Koi no Mahō" of "Qing Chun Dou" was released in Japan on January 27, 2010. It was included in the Japanese celebration edition released on February 5, 2010.

"Qing Chun Dou", "青春鬥 (Youth Bucket)", was featured in the hit Taiwanese TV drama Hi My Sweetheart starring Rainie Yang and Show Lo.

== Background ==
In 2009, the newly formed South Korean girl group 4Minute with Hyun-a of The Wonder Girls, recorded a Korean-language version of "Tick Tock". When 4Minute did not release "Tick Tock", Rainie Yang recorded a Mandarin language version entitled "Qing Chun Dou" and a Japanese-language version entitled "Koi no Mahō".

== Music video ==
An official music video for "Qing Chun Dou (Youth Bucket)" was released by Sony in January 2010. It describes a girl's youth being chased by time throughout her life. Rainie Yang, the main character, shows her dance in this MV, which, according to her, "seems to be filming a martial arts scene, but it was a lot of fun."

== Live performances and usage in other media ==
- "Hi My Sweetheart" (2010) - "Qing Chun Dou" and instrumental underscore, with live appearance by Rainie Yang & Show Lo.
- "100% Entertainment" (2010) - "Qing Chun Dou" with live appearance by Rainie Yang & Show Lo
- "Hollywood Heights (TV series)" (2012) - "Tick Tock" English-language version by Tick Tock Team
- "Miss Universe China" (2012) - "Tick Tock" English-language version by Tick Tock Team
- "Daredevil" (season 2) (2016) - "Qing Chun Dou"

== Appearance on compilation albums ==
Tick Tock (Beat the Clock) was included in the Compilation album Whimsical World Collection. The album included 35 hit singles by Rainie Yang and 3 unreleased songs.
