= Traces of Time in Love =

Studio album by Rainie Yang
- Released: September 30, 2016
- Recorded: 2016
- Genre: Pop
- Length: 45:10
- Language: Mandarin
- Label: EMI

Rainie Yang chronology
A Tale of Two Rainie (2014)	Traces of Time in Love (2016)	Delete Reset Grow (2019)

Singles from Traces of Time in Love
- 1. "Traces of Time in Love" Released: September 9, 2016

Traces of Time in Love (Chinese: 年輪說; pinyin: Nián lún shuō) is the tenth Mandarin studio album by Taiwanese recording artist Rainie Yang. It was released on September 30, 2016, through EMI, her second album on the sublabel of Universal Music Taiwan.

== Accolades ==
The album was nominated for three awards at the 28th Golden Melody Awards, including Song of the Year, Best Lyricist and Best Single Producer, for the title track "Traces of Time in Love".

== Track listing ==
Traces of Time in Love track listing
No.	Title	Lyrics	Music	Length
1.	"Traces of Time in Love" (年輪說; Nián lún shuō)	Greeny Wu	Zheng Yu Jie (鄭宇界)	4:26
2.	"Being Single" (單; Dān)	Xiaohan	No Name (余荃斌)	4:04
3.	"Don't Care Anymore" (與我無關; Yǔ wǒ wú guān)	Rao Hui Bing (饒彗冰)	Jia Wang (佳旺)	4:38
4.	"Us" (我們; Wǒ men)	Shadya Lan (藍小邪)	Alex Zhang Jian (張簡君偉)	4:36
5.	"The Lesson of Love" (相愛的方法; Xiāng ài de fāng fǎ)	Yao Qian (姚謙)	Percy Phang (彭學斌)	4:21
6.	"Modern Image" (現代之形象; Xiàn dài zhī xíng xiàng)	Greeny Wu	Du Zhi Wen (都智文)	3:42
7.	"The Audience" (觀眾; Guān zhòng)	Li Ronghao	Li Ronghao	5:10
8.	"Oh, Love" (愛唷; Ài yō)	Wu Yi Jian (吳以健)	Yise Loo (羅憶詩)	4:20
9.	"Nightlight" (點一盞無聊的小夜燈; Diǎn yì zhǎn wú liáo de xiǎo yè dēng)	Vivian Hsu	Wu Jia Hui (伍家輝)	5:03
10.	"Sleepy Lover" (想睡的戀人噢; Xiǎng shuì de liàn rén ō)	Katie Lee (李格弟)	George Chen (陳建騏)	4:50
Total length:				45:10

Notes

- "Traces of Time in Love" ("年輪說") was featured as the opening theme song of the drama series Life Plan A and B.
- "The Lesson of Love" ("相愛的方法") was featured as the ending theme song of the drama series Life Plan A and B.
- "Being Single" ("單") was featured as an insert song of the drama series Life Plan A and B.

== Release history ==
Release history for Traces of Time in Love
Region	Date	Format(s)	Label
Various	September 30, 2016	Digital download; streaming	EMI Records Taiwan
Taiwan	September 30, 2016	CD	EMI Records Taiwan
