= A Tale of Two Rainie =

- A Tale of Two Rainie standard edition cover

Studio album 雙丞戲 by Rainie Yang
- Released: 12 December 2014
- Genre: Mandopop
- Language: Mandarin
- Label: EMI
- Producers: Kevin Quah, Ma Yu-fen (馬毓芬), Kang Lu (呂康惟)

Rainie Yang chronology
Angel Wings (2013)	A Tale of Two Rainie (2014)	Traces of Time in Love (2016)

Singles from A Tale of Two Rainie
- 1. "點水" Released: 6 November 2014; 2. "失憶的金魚" Released: 1 December 2014

A Tale of Two Rainie (Chinese: 雙丞戲; pinyin: Shuang Cheng Xi) (literally: Double Rainie Play) is the ninth Mandarin studio album by Taiwanese Mandopop artist Rainie Yang (Chinese: 楊丞琳). It was released on 12 December 2014 through EMI, her first album on the sublabel of Universal Music Taiwan. The lead single, "點水", written by Lala Hsu, was released on 6 November 2014. A special edition of the album was released on 9 January 2015.

== Track listing ==
No.	Title	Lyrics	Music	Translation	Length
1.	"點水 (diǎn shuǐ)"	Lala Hsu	Lala Hsu	Ripples	4:19
2.	"我想愛 (wǒ xiǎng ài)"	David Ke (葛大為)	Du Zhi Wen (都智文)	Love Is On The Way	3:29
3.	"失憶的金魚 (shī yì de jīn yú)"	Qian Zi (淺紫)	Du Zhi Wen	Goldfish With Amnesia	4:33
4.	"掛失的青春 (guà shī de qīng chūn)"	Guan Qi Yuan (管啟源)	Yu Heng (宇珩)	Lost Youth	5:16
5.	"下個轉彎是你嗎 (xià gè zhuǎn wān shì nǐ ma)"	Greeny Wu	Greeny Wu	Is It You At The Next Corner	4:44
6.	"差一個擁抱 (chā yī gè yōng bào)"	Guan Qi Yuan	Jae Ell, Ava Kay, Mads Hedstrom	Missing Embrace	3:44
7.	"其實我們值得幸褔 (qí shí wǒ men zhí de xìng fú)"	Guan Qi Yuan	Peng Xue Bin (彭學斌)	We Deserve Happiness	4:49
8.	"喜劇收場 (xǐ jù shōu chǎng)"	David Ke, You Zheng Hao (游政豪)	You Zheng Hao, Ding Zi Heng (丁子恆)	Happy Ending	4:41
9.	"怕 (pà)"	Wonderful	Derrick Tham (譚志華)	Afraid	4:09
10.	"懂得自己 (dǒng de zì jǐ)"	Daryl Yao	Jia Wang (佳旺)	Understand Yourself	3:14

Notes

- "我想愛" and "下個轉彎是你嗎'" were featured as the theme songs of the drama series Love at Second Sight.

== Music videos ==
Song	Director	Release date	Notes	Ref
"點水"	Vera Solaris	20 November 2014	Featuring Jasper Liu	
"失憶的金魚"	Shockley Huang (黃中平)	3 December 2014	Featuring Hans Chung	
"其實我們值得幸福"	Allure Lu (呂來慧)	12 December 2014	Featuring Ariel Lin	
"下個轉彎是你嗎"	Arvin Chen	5 January 2015	Shot in New York City	
"喜劇收場"	Allure Lu (呂來慧)	16 January 2015		
"怕"	-	26 February 2015	Taichung Metropolitan Opera House mini-concert footage	
