= Only in Echoes =

- Only in Echoes digital cover

Studio album by Rainie Yang
- Released: 22 October 2025
- Genre: Mandopop
- Language: Mandarin
- Label: Sony Music Entertainment China

Rainie Yang chronology
Like a Star (2020)	Only in Echoes (2025)

Singles from Only in Echoes
- 1. "Ambiguous: Rewoven (曖昧 2025 Version)" Released: 9 September 2025; 2. "The Elephant We See (房間裡的大象)" Released: 20 September 2025; 3. "Only in Echoes (有且)" Released: 6 October 2025; 4. "Yes, but?" Released: 20 October 2025

Only in Echoes (Chinese: 有且; pinyin: yǒu qiě) is the thirteenth Mandarin studio album by Taiwanese Mandopop artist Rainie Yang. It was released on 22 October 2025 through Sony Music Entertainment China.

== Track listing ==
No.	Title	Lyrics	Music	Length
1.	"The Elephant We See" (房間裡的大象)	Juice (劉嘉星)	Juice	4:26
2.	"Only in Echoes" (有且)	Volcano (郁采真)	Volcano, Wei Lee (李子維)	3:57
3.	"Yes, but?"	Yuen Chen (陳信延)	Joshua Leung (梁思樺), Satoru Kurihara (Jazzin'park)	2:43
4.	"Falling Numb" (免疫體)	Mono (楊格), Sean (袁景翔), Juice, ATO (孫睦涵), Juny (謝君妍)	Mono, Sean, Juice, ATO, Juny	3:55
5.	"Debtless" (無須歸還)	Kelly Zhong (鍾凱琳)	Kelly Zhong	4:38
6.	"Mirror Monologue" (獨白)	Jay Hong, Hyung Shin, Midi Yang (楊士弘)	Jay Hong, Hyung Shin	3:59
7.	"Riding the Breeze" (坐上慢車吹自由的風)	Volcano	Volcano, Wei Lee	4:11
8.	"Still You" (在意你)	Shuangfei Li (李雙飛)	Shuangfei Li	4:14
9.	"Trapped in Yesterday" (困在最初愛過的地方)	Vison Chen (陳學聖), Senhuai (森淮森懷)	Volcano	3:45
10.	"Unboxing Myself" (我的正確打開方式)	Midi Yang, Jay Hong, BooJoo, Jabong	Jay Hong, BooJoo, Jabong	2:55
11.	"Desert in Bloom" (仙人掌的花)	Money Wen (溫曼尼)	Yu Guo (于果)	4:01
Total length:				42:51

=== Bonus ===
No.	Title	Lyrics	Music	Length
12.	"Ambiguous: Rewoven" (曖昧 2025 Version)	Lydia Chiang (姜憶萱), Anson Yen (顏璽軒)	Frio Cheng (小冷)	4:07
Total length:				46:58

== Music videos ==
Song	Director	Release date	Notes	Ref
Ambiguous: Rewoven (曖昧 2025 Version)	-	9 September 2025	-	
The Elephant We See (房間裡的大象)	Muh Chen (陈奕仁)	27 September 2025	-	
Only in Echoes (有且)	YIN (殷振豪)	13 October 2025	Featuring Joseph Chang	
Yes, but?	Jeremy Z. Qin (秦梓銘)	24 October 2025	-	
Falling Numb (免疫體)	JP Huang (黃中平)	6 November 2025	Featuring Dean Fujioka	
Riding the Breeze (坐上慢車吹自由的風)	JP Huang (黃中平)	18 November 2025	-	
Mirror Monologue (獨白)	Chen Hung-i (陈宏一)	4 December 2025	-	
