= Like a Star (album) =

- Like a Star digital cover

Studio album by Rainie Yang
- Released: 5 November 2020
- Genre: Mandopop
- Language: Mandarin
- Label: EMI

Rainie Yang chronology
Delete Reset Grow 刪‧拾 以後 (2019)	Like a Star (2020)	Only in Echoes 有且 (2025)

Singles from Like a Star
- 1. "Like a Star (像是一顆星星)" Released: 18 August 2020; 2. "Bad Lady" Released: 11 September 2020; 3. "Singing in the Rain" Released: 30 September 2020; 4. "Girls (女孩們)" Released: 15 October 2020

Like a Star (stylised in all caps) is the twelfth Mandarin studio album by Taiwanese Mandopop artist Rainie Yang. It was released on 5 November 2020 through EMI, her fourth album on the sublabel of Universal Music Taiwan. This album marks Yang's twentieth anniversary since her debut. It also signifies her return to dance music, including genres such as trap and trance.

Yang also embarked on a world tour of the same name on 6 November 2020.

The album's title track, "Like a Star", was ranked 42nd on Hit FM Top 100 Singles of the Year while "Girls" was placed at 59th.

== Track listing ==
No.	Title	Lyrics	Music	Length
1.	"The Ruthless"		Shawn Chen (陳璿翔)	0:35
2.	"Bad Lady"	Li Ronghao^{[a]}	Karencici	3:23
3.	"Singing in the Rain"	Steven Lai (賴暐哲), B-shot (林碧霞), PeachGreen, KarFun (李佳歡)	Steven Lai, B-shot, PeachGreen, KarFun	3:49
4.	"Girls" (女孩們; nǚ hái men) (feat. Cyndi Wang)	Matthew Yen (嚴云農), Razor Chiang (剃刀蔣)	Tae Wan, Alicia Angel, Nico Larsson, Jay Max	3:05
5.	"Like a Star" (像是一顆星星; xiàng shì yī kē xīng xīng)	Li Ronghao	Jackson Lee, Jay Hong	3:56
6.	"Perfect Match" (配對配; pèi duì pèi) (feat. Chen Linong)	Cheer Chou (啟兒)	Dena Chang (張粹方), KIRE	3:20
7.	"Indulging" (漂流浴室; piāo liú yù shì)	Chen Xin Yan (陳信延), Janice Yan (閻奕格), M.A.T.H, Victor Lai (劉偉德)	Chen Xin Yan, Janice Yan, M.A.T.H, Victor Lai	3:10
8.	"Cuz of U" (都因為你; dōu yīn wèi nǐ)	Peggy Hsu	Gao Wei Lun (高維綸), Vera Chai, $$uperCandy (唐紹崴)	3:48
9.	"Tyre Burnout"		Razor Chiang	0:22
10.	"Bad Lady Remix" (feat. Razor Chiang)	Li Ronghao	Karencici	3:06
Total length:				28:30

Notes

- ^{^a} On Bad Lady, Li Ronghao is credited as a lyricist under the pseudonym Whale (鯨魚).

== Music videos ==
Song	Director	Release date	Notes	Ref
Bad Lady	Kuang Sheng (鄺盛), Jimi Chou (周啟民)	11 September 2020	Choreographed by Kiel Tutin	
Singing in the Rain	Kuang Sheng	30 September 2020	Featuring Pietro Baltazar	
Girls (女孩們)	JP Huang (黃中平)	16 October 2020	Featuring Cyndi Wang and Vasyl Chornyi	
Like a Star (像是一顆星星)	Muh Chen (陳奕仁)	1 November 2020	Featuring Jacky Wu, Aya Liu, 4 in Love and Yang's mother	
Indulging (漂流浴室)	Kuang Sheng	16 November 2020		
