= Why Why Love =

- Promotional poster
- Also known as: 換換愛; Huan Huan Ai
- Genre: Romantic comedy
- Directed by: Lin He Long (林合隆)
- Starring: Rainie Yang; Mike He; Kingone Wang
- Opening theme: "我要的世界" (The World I Want) by Kingone Wang
- Ending theme: "缺氧" (Breathless) by Rainie Yang
- Country of origin: Republic of China (Taiwan)
- Original language: Mandarin
- No. of episodes: 15

Production
- Running time: 90 mins (Sundays at 21:30)
- Production company: Comic Ritz International Production

Original release
- Network: Chinese Television System (CTS)
- Release: 3 June – 9 September 2007

Related
- Summer x Summer (熱情仲夏); Sweet Relationship (美味關係); Devil Beside You (惡魔在身邊)

Why Why Love (Chinese: 換換愛; pinyin: Huan Huan Ai) is a 2007 Taiwanese Drama starring Rainie Yang, Mike He and Kingone Wang. Since all 3 starred in the 2005 China Television drama Devil Beside You, this was originally thought to be the sequel. However, Why Why Love is not the sequel and has a distinctly different story line. It was originally titled Exchange Love. It was produced by Comic Ritz International Production (可米瑞智國際藝能有限公司) and directed by Lin He Long (林合隆).

The series was broadcast on free-to-air Chinese Television System (CTS) (華視) from 3 June 2007 to 9 September 2007, every Sunday at 21:30 and cable TV Gala Television (GTV) Variety Show/CH 28 (八大綜合台) from 9 June 2007 to 15 September 2007, every Saturday at 21:00.

In 2008, Rainie Yang was nominated for Best Actress and Lin He Long was nominated for Best Director in a Television Series at the 43rd Golden Bell Awards, Taiwan.

== Cast ==
Actor	Character	Relationships
Rainie Yang	Tong Jia Di (童嘉蒂)	
Mike He	Huo Da (霍達)	Huo Yan Half Brother and later Tong Jia Di's boyfriend
Kingone Wang	Huo Yan (霍彥)	Huo Da Half Brother
Judy Qiu	Yang Yan Shu (楊妍書)	Huo Yan's assistant
Michelle Chen	Jiang Xiao Nan (江小南)	Jia Di's best friend
Xu Shi Hao	Wu Bo Zi (波子)	Huo Da's best friend
Ge Wei Ru	Liao Cai Juan (廖彩娟)	Jia Di's mother
Sun Qin Yue	Tong Jia Hui (童嘉輝)	Jia Di's brother
Ye Min Zhi	Tong Bao San (童寶山)	Jia Di's uncle
Wang Dao	Huo Zhen Hao (霍振浩)	Huo Yan and Huo Da's father
Jin Yu Lan	Qin Yu Hua (秦玉華)	Huo Yan's mother
Eric Tu	Sai Lang	
Carolyn Chen	group leader	
Fu Pei Ci		Tong Jia Di's cousin
Xiang Bo Tao	childhood Huo Yan	
Xu Qiong Yun	childhood Yang Yan Shu	

== Plot ==
Tong Jia Di (Rainie Yang) led a normal life. Non-stop working and outstanding debts can so called, her uniqueness. Her best friend, Jiang Xiao Nan (Michelle Chen) wants Jia Di to fall in love and she tries to set Jia Di up. Xiao Nan carried out her first plan at a carnival by selling exchange coupons that she wrote on. There, Jia Di meets the two sons of the owner of the company, Huo Yan (Kingone Wang) and Huo Da (Mike He), who buy exchange coupons from Jia Di.

Then, on her 20th birthday, Xiao Nan wishes that Jia Di will ask the tenth guy who passes by for his phone number. Huo Da and Huo Yan had a bet and are in an accident on motor bikes they ended up with broken arms (Huo Yan) or broken legs (Huo Da) This resulted in the trio meeting again. During this meeting, Jia Di asks for Huo Yan's phone number which he obliged, however his phone number was accidentally mentioned in their class that it was used online for a bad site which made Huo Yan mistrust Jia Di but they were able to patch things up.

Huo Da's dislike for Jia Di soon changes after Jia Di fulfills her roles in accordance to the "angel-owner" service coupon that Huo Da bought. Huo Da soon found out that he had fallen in love with Jia Di. Eventually, Huo Yan and Huo Da both fall in love with Jia Di, and try to win her over in their own ways and Jia Di is soon caught in a love triangle. The drama details the struggle between the half-brothers over Jia Di. However, Jia Di falls in love with Huo Da.

Later on, Huo Da is diagnosed with Wilson's disease and is dying. He chose not to reveal his illness to anyone except Yan Shu. Assuming that he will die soon, Huo Da acts coldly in front of Jia Di and even tells Huo Yan that he can have her. Jia Di eventually finds out what happened. She encourages Huo Da to live on for love.

Meanwhile, Huo Yan tries to find ways to cure his younger brother's sickness. He soon finds out that his brother will need a liver donation and the former is the only suitable donor. Huo Yan agrees to undergo the transplant despite his heart problems. Viewers are led to believe that the operation ended badly for Huo Da, but it was eventually shown that he happily survived.

== Characters ==
Tong Jia Di (Rainie Yang): She is a hardworking girl who comes from a poor family. She is the elder daughter in a family consisting of her mother Liao Cai Juan and younger brother Tong Jia Hui. Her father died when she was still a little girl. Together with her mom, they make a living by selling vegetables on the streets. She will do anything for money in order to help settle the family debts. She also has an uncle who makes unwise investments, leading to the accumulation of debts, burdening the family even further. Jia Di is so dedicated to her family and work, she refuses to fall in love and have high hopes that way she feels no disappointment. Jia Di is best friends with Jiang Xiao Nan. They work as part-time workers at the Huo's Family Emporium. In addition, Jia Di has many part-time jobs such as working at the petrol station.

Huo Da (Mike He) A rebel and the second heir to the Huo Co. Huo Da is also nicknamed "Devil Boy" due to his reputation of pranks and rude attitude. Dislikes Huo Yan because Huo Yan's mother's affair with Huo Da's father is what caused Huo Da's mother to suicide. Huo Da loves Yan Shu but she loves Huo Yan, Huo Da's elder brother. Jia Di fulfills her roles in accordance to the "angel-owner" service coupon, He enjoys bullying and making fun of Jia Di but because of her pure and kind heart, he slowly fell in love with her. He was able to win Jia Di's heart but unfortunately he soon discovers that he has Wilson's disease. He is reluctant to tell Jia Di since he doesn't want her to be lonely when he dies. However, he was able to continue living thanks to his brother and live happily with Jia Di.

Huo Yan (Kingone Wang): He is the General Manager of their company and the elder brother of Huo Da . He is the exact opposite of Huo Da . Everything about Huo Yan is impressive. Huo Yan is also nicknamed "10th Guy". At the beginning, Huo Yan and Jia Di were interested in each other and often talked and helped each other. But when Huo Yan realizes that Jia Di has feelings for Huo Da he agrees to let her be with Huo Da after he lost to a motorcycle race for Jia Di's love. Huo Yan has a bad childhood memory, his mother sold him to the Huo family because she was unable to cure Huo Yan's heart weakness. But after his mother selling Huo Yan to the Huo family, for years Huo Yan hated his mother, but when it came to his mother's death, they patch things up. After learning that Huo Da has Wilson's disease, he chose to risk his own life to save his younger brother. In the end, both brothers survive.

== Multimedia ==
=== Music ===
- Opening theme song: "我要的世界" (The World I Want) by Kingone Wang
- Ending theme song: "缺氧" (Breathless) by Rainie Yang

Insert songs

- "換換愛" (Why Why Love) by Kingone Wang
- "Welcome To My Heart" by Kingone Wang
- "完美比例" (Perfect Example) by Rainie Yang

The songs were released by the respective artists: Rainie Yang - My Other Self and Wang Kingone - 1st EP Love, KingOne

=== Books ===
- Why Why Love TV Drama Novel (換換愛電視小說) - ISBN 978-986-133-201-7
- Why Why Love Photobook (換換愛寫真書) - ISBN 986-133-204-9
- Why Why Love Photobook + Poster (換換愛談情說愛寫真手札 - 書+海報)
- Why Why Love Photo Album + Notebook (換換愛談情說愛寫真手札) - ISBN 978-986-83258-2-1

== Awards ==
2008 - 43rd Golden Bell Awards, Taiwan
Nomination	Category	Result
Rainie Yang	Best Actress	Nominated
Lin He Long	Best Director in a Television Series	Nominated
