= Heartbeat Love =

- Poster
- Also known as: 再一次心跳
- Genre: Romance, Comedy
- Written by: Enrix Ren
- Directed by: Leste Chen
- Starring: Rainie Yang; Show Lo
- Ending theme: "王見王" (When The King Meets Queen) by Rainie Yang and Show Lo
- Country of origin: China
- Original language: Mandarin
- No. of episodes: 5

Production
- Producers: Jimmy Chou; Cason Chuang
- Production locations: Melbourne; Sydney; Tasmania

Heartbeat Love (Chinese: 再一次心跳) is a 2012 Taiwanese miniseries starring Rainie Yang and Show Lo. It was filmed in Australia (Sydney, Melbourne and Tasmania). It is a miniseries that aired on the internet, and has a total of 5 episodes. It started 12 April 2012, and aired every Thursday midnight China time (i.e. early Thursday morning). This was the second time these two stars collaborated after the successful Taiwanese drama Hi My Sweetheart.

Australia's tourism commission invested in the film to introduce Australia to Chinese tourists.

== Synopsis ==
Heartbeat Love is a miniseries that chronicles the love story between two travelers named Lee Wei Chen and Yang Xiao Yu (played by Show Lo and Rainie Yang respectively) who, due to a gender misunderstanding on Xiao Yu's part, share a hotel room in Australia. Xiao Yu initially mistakes Lee as being gay, and therefore agrees to share a room and sleep on the same bed as him. (This misunderstanding happened because Lee accidentally exchanged his bag with a gay named GayGay.) The night when they share the room Lee manages to get Gaygay's phone number and arranges to meet up the next day and switch back the suitcases.

The next day, they go out together and accidentally fall in love with each other after pretending to be a married couple. After the day ended, they both went back to the hotel. In the hotel, Gaygay was waiting in the lobby for them and they exchanged their bag. Xiao Yu is very angry about Lee's deception. She slaps him and runs away.

Day after that, they both went to Melbourne deciding they will not share the same room anymore so they both went to different directions. That day, they coincidentally meet up several times, much to Xiao Yu's anger and Lee's chagrin. They end up meeting again in a food store, where Xiao Yu is forced to beg for Lee's help in escaping a guy who comes in, though she refuses to tell Lee who the man is. They continue their day and Xiao Yu finally forgives Lee. They end up kissing and sleeping together.

They continue to vacation, until the man Xiao Yu had run from shows up while she is trying on wedding dresses. Lee helps her escape again, but demands the truth from her. She tells him that her life is similar to "Roman Holiday," a film in which a runaway bride seizes her last few days of independence. Lee asks her if she ever had any feelings for him, and she says no. Heartbroken, he returns to Taiwan.

After a year, Lee meets up with the man Xiao Yu had run from. Lee asks about their marriage, and the man informs him that he is Xiao Yu's brother. He hands Lee a video explaining that Xiao Yu hadn't been engaged—she'd undergone a very risky heart surgery and hadn't wanted to hurt him by telling him the truth. Lee goes to the island to find her—following the trail of pictures that she left him—and they meet up in Tasmania happily.

== Cast ==
- Rainie Yang as Yang Xiao Yu: diagnosed with a heart disease from a young age, she was protected and sheltered for the first twenty years of her life. Faced with a surgery with only 1/3 chance of success, she decides to throw caution to the wind and travel. Through a series of misunderstandings and coincidences, she meets and falls in love with Lee Wei Chen. Due to her reluctance to share her heart condition, she continually lies to him, even allowing her brother to tell Lee that she had died. In the end, she reunites with Lee and it is implied that they get married.
- Show Lo as Lee Wei Chen: a photographer, Lee claims to be able to read truth off a person's eyes, and demonstrates several times on Xiao Yu. He seems to fall in love with her first, and is continuously upset when she refuses to tell him the truth about why she came to the island. Despite this, he protects her and helps her escape from the man who she tells him is her fiance, but who, in reality, is her brother.

== Music ==
- 王見王 When the King Meets the Queen by Rainie Yang and Show Lo
- 愛。不用說 Love Is Wordless by Show Lo
- 今天你最漂亮（ You Are The World's Best Looking Girl by Show Lo
