= Rainie & Love...? =

Studio album by Rainie Yang
- Released: January 1, 2010
- Recorded: 2009
- Genre: Pop
- Length: 40:09
- Language: Mandarin
- Label: Sony Music Taiwan

Rainie Yang chronology
Not Yet a Woman (2008)	Rainie & Love...? (2010)	Whimsical World Collection (2010)

Singles from Longing For
- 1. "Rain Love" Released: December 10, 2009; 2. "Anonymous Friend" Released: January 1, 2010; 3. "Youth Bucket" Released: January 1, 2010

Rainie & Love...? (Chinese: 雨愛; pinyin: Yǔ ài) is the fifth Mandarin studio album by Taiwanese recording artist Rainie Yang. It was released on January 1, 2010, by Sony Music Taiwan. Two editions of the album were released: pre-order edition and a celebration edition with different issues for Taiwan and Hong Kong. Its Japanese version was also issued for the Japanese market.

== Songs ==
The tracks "Rainie Love" is the ending theme; and "Youth Bucket", "Anonymous Friend", and "In Your Eyes", a duet with Show Lo, are insert songs of Taiwanese drama Hi My Sweetheart, starring Show Lo and Yang. "In Your Eyes" also included in Show Lo's seventh studio album Rashomon under his label Warner Music Taiwan.

== Commercial performance ==
The album is tied fifth best selling album in Taiwan in 2010, with 50,000 copies sold, with To Hebe by Hebe Tien of S.H.E. The tracks "Rainie Love" and "Anonymous Friend" are listed at number 22 and number 69 respectively, on Hit FM's Top 100 Singles of the Year chart for 2010.

== Track listing ==
Rainie & Love...? – Standard edition
No.	Title	Writer(s)	Length
1.	"Rain Love" (雨愛; Yu Ai)	Jin Dazhou (金大洲); Jiang Duquan (蔣篤全)	4:20
2.	"In Your Eyes" (featuring Show Lo)	Jeon Jun Gyu; Cui Weikai (崔惟楷)	4:29
3.	"Youth Bucket" (青春鬥; Qing Chun Dou)	Roxanne Seeman; Olav Fossheim; Kine Ludvigsen-Fossheim; Li Zongen (李宗恩)	2:58
4.	"Naughty Cupid" (調皮的愛神; Diao Pi De Ai Shen)	Frankie Storm; Larry Summerville Jr.; Milvin K. Watson Jr.; Cui Weikai (崔惟楷)	4:55
5.	"Foldable Love" (摺疊式愛情; Zhe Die Shi Ai Qing)	Jia Fang Tong Xue (佳芳同學); Yao Ruolong (姚若龍)	4:04
6.	"Anonymous Friend" (匿名的好友; Ni Ming De Hao You)	Chen Yingjian (陳穎見); Li Zhuoxiong (李焯雄)	4:22
7.	"It's Killing Me" (要我的命; Yao Wo De Ming)	Nicole Morier; Mindy Brock; Bram Inscore; John Kirby; Li Zongen (李宗恩)	3:39
8.	"Absolute Darling" (絕對達令; Jue Dui Da Ling)	Zhuang Qixin (莊啟馨); Wu Benwei (吳本緯)	4:07
9.	"New Flu" (新流感; Xing Liu Gan)	Steven Andrew Smith; Anthony George Anderson; Joleen Belle; Windy Wagner; Ma Songwei (馬嵩惟)	3:26
10.	"Love for the Second Time" (二度戀愛; Er Du Lian Ai)	Chen Weiquan (陳威全); Wu Yuhong (鄔裕康)	3:49
Total length:			40:09

Rainie & Love...? – DVD
No.	Title	Length
1.	"Rain Love" (雨愛)
2.	"In Your Eyes"
3.	"Absolute Darling" (絕對達令)
4.	"Anonymous Friend" (匿名的好友)
5.	"Youth Bucket" (青春鬥)

== Charts ==
=== Weekly charts ===
Chart (2010)	Peak position
Taiwanese Albums (G-Music)	1

=== Year-end charts ===
Chart (2010)	Position
Taiwanese Albums (G-Music)	5

== Release history ==
Release history for Rainie & Love...?
Region	Date	Format(s)	Label
Taiwan	January 1, 2010	CD; CD+DVD; digital download	Sony Music Taiwan
Hong Kong	January 1, 2010	CD; CD+DVD; digital download	Sony Music Taiwan
Japan	March 24, 2010	CD; CD+DVD	Sony Music Taiwan
