= My Intuition =

Studio album by Rainie Yang
- Released: 9 September 2005
- Genre: Mandopop
- Length: 40:54
- Language: Mandarin
- Label: Sony Music Taiwan

Rainie Yang chronology
My Intuition (2005)	Meeting Love (2006)

My Intuition (Chinese: 曖昧; pinyin: Àimèi; lit. 'ambiguous') is the debut studio album by Taiwanese recording artist Rainie Yang. It was released by Sony Music Taiwan on 9 September 2005. Commercially, it sold more than 1 million copies in East and Southeast Asia.

== Background and release ==
The literal translation of the Chinese title "曖昧" suggests that a man and woman are involved romantically but the status or nature of their relationship has not been clarified to each other or to others, and therefore in an ambiguous state.

== Songs ==
The album contains ten tracks, two of which are featured in Taiwanese drama, Devil Beside You (Chinese: 惡魔在身邊), as well as the Mandarin version of "True Blue", the theme song for Astro Boy. A second edition of the album was released on 11 November 2005 that included a VCD with five music videos.

== Commercial performance ==
The album was awarded one of the Top 10 Selling Mandarin Albums of the Year at the 2005 IFPI Hong Kong Album Sales Awards, presented by the Hong Kong branch of International Federation of the Phonographic Industry (IFPI).

== Track listing ==
1. "乖不乖" Guai Bu Guai (Obedient Or Not)
2. "曖昧" Ai Mei (Ambiguous) - ending theme song Devil Beside You
3. "理想情人" Li Xiang Qing Ren (Ideal Lover) - insert song Devil Beside You
4. "只想愛你" Zhi Xiang Ai Ni (Just Wanna Love You)
5. "單眼皮" Dan Yan Pi (Single Eyelid)
6. "習慣" Xi Guan (Habit)
7. "不見" Bu Jian (Disappear)
8. "愛情的顏色" Ai Qing De Yan Se (Color Of Love)
9. "True Blue" - Astro Boy theme song
10. "下一次微笑" Xia Yi Ci Wei Xiao (Next Time Smiling)

== Music videos ==
1. "乖不乖" (Obedient Or Not) MV
2. "曖昧" (Ambiguous) MV
3. "理想情人" (Ideal Lover) MV
4. "只想愛你" (Just Wanna Love You) MV
5. "單眼皮" (Single Eyelid) MV
6. "習慣" (Habit) MV
7. "不見" (Disappear) MV
8. "愛情的顏色" (Color Of Love) MV
9. "下一次微笑" (Next Time Smiling) MV

== Charts ==
Chart (2005)	Peak position
Taiwanese Albums (G-Music)	1

== Sales and certifications ==
Region	Certification	Certified units/sales
Taiwan (RIT)	Platinum	160,000
Summaries
Asia	—	1,000,000
