= Kine Ludvigsen =

Norwegian singer

Kine
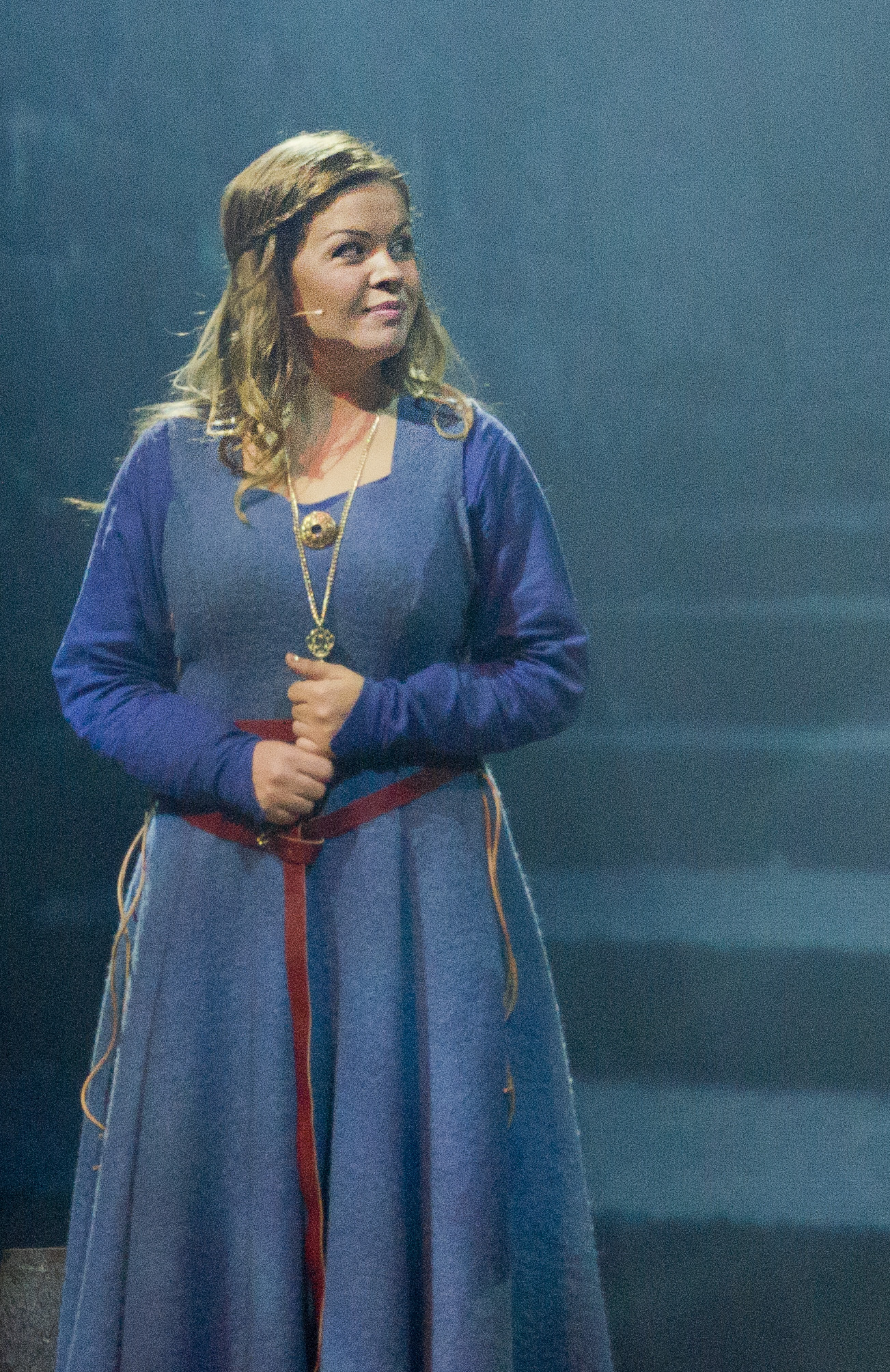
- Born: Kine Ludvigsen; 21 July 1982 (age 44); Norway
- Occupation: Singer
- Years active: 1991–present
- Spouse: Olav Fossheim
- Children: 2
- Musical career
- Genres: Pop; gospel; Cantopop
- Instrument: Vocals
- Labels: Sony Music; RCA Records; Mercury Records

Kine Therese Ludvigsen Fossheim (born July 21, 1982) is a Norwegian singer best known for her work with the Oslo Gospel Choir, her six solo albums, the song "Sarajevo" released as a single for Lillehammer Olympic Aid, and songs written for Chinese artists including Jacky Cheung, Rainie Yang and Stephy Tang.

== Education and career beginnings ==
Kine was born in Hamar where she grew up. She studied music, dance and drama at Stange upper secondary school. In 1991, at 9 years old, she released her first album.

Kine created the song "Sarajevo" together with Geirr Lystrup. for Lillehammer Olympic Aid during the siege of the Bosnian capital. It was released as a single and served as became an anthem for the 1994 Winter Olympics, held in Lillehammer, Norway.

== 2000 - present ==
As a 17-year-old, she participated in the Melodi Grand Prix 2000 with «Wings of Love».

In 2005, Kine released her sixth album, "Free". The album was released by Sony Norway including a cover of "In The Air Tonight". She co-wrote all of the songs with the exception of the cover. The lead single "Hit The Floor"reached 13 on the Norwegian charts. The album and song was an international release. "In The Air Tonight" by Kine was included in SingStar Norwegian Hits, PlayStation 2, released 2007.

Ludvigsen-Fossheim is a soloist with the Oslo Gospel Choir. She is featured on the Andrae Crouch song "Comin' Back" and "Joy To The World" on "This Is The Day: Live In Montreux Part One".

May 2009, the song "One" was released by the Oslo Soul Children feat Kine. Ludvigsen-Fossheim is a soloist with the Gospel Explosion.

In 2019, Kine was chosen, along with Frode Vassel and Marianne Pentha, to sing for Norway in the Eurovision Song Contest 2019 second semifinal on May 16. She performed "Spirit In The Sky" as a singer of the group Keiino.

In 2010, Ludvigsen-Fossheim and Olav Fossheim, in a collaboration with American songwriter Roxanne Seeman, wrote the songs "Double Trouble", "Tick Tock (Beat The Clock)" and "No One Knows" for Chinese singers Jacky Cheung, Rainie Yang and Stephy Tang. All of the songs were released as singles accompanied by music videos. "Double Trouble" was a featured production number in Cheung's "Jacky Cheung 1/2 Century Tour". An English-language version of the song "Tick Tock" sung by Kine appeared in the Miss Universe China pageant.

== Discography ==
=== Studio albums ===
- 1991 – Kine 1
- 1993 – Kine 2
- 1993 – Min julesang
- 1995 – Tanker jeg tenker
- 1997 – Barndomsminner
- 2004 – Free

=== Singles ===
- 1992 – Sarajevo
- 2000 – Wings of Love
- 2001 – C'mon, C'mon
- 2004 – Hit the Floor
- 2004 – In the Air Tonight
- 2004 – Sweet Tasty Honey
- 2013 – Daydreaming
- 2014 – Sol! (with lo Schow Trio)
- 2016 – Home Again
- 2019 – Beautiful Day
- 2020 – Call Upon His Name
