= Not Yet a Woman =

Not Yet A Woman

Studio album by Rainie Yang
- Released: November 7, 2008
- Recorded: 2008
- Genre: Pop
- Length: 36:25
- Language: Mandarin
- Label: Sony Music Taiwan

Rainie Yang chronology
My Other Self (2007)	Not Yet A Woman (2008)	Rainie & Love...? (2010)

Not Yet a Woman (Chinese: 半熟宣言; pinyin: Bànshú xuānyán) is the fourth Mandarin studio album by Taiwanese singer Rainie Yang. It was released by Sony Music Taiwan on November 7, 2008.

== Songs ==
It features the ending theme song "帶我走" (Take Me Away) and insert song "太煩惱" (Too Much Trouble) of Taiwanese drama Miss No Good, starring Yang, Will Pan and Dean Fujioka. The track "太煩惱" (Too Much Trouble) is a cover song of German Alternative Rock band Wir sind Helden.

== Track listing ==
Not Yet a Woman – Standard edition
No.	Title	Length
1.	"Too Much Trouble" (太煩惱; Tai Fan Nao)	4:20
2.	"Take Me Away" (帶我走; Dai Wo Zou)	4:29
3.	"My Love Drips and Drops" (我的愛吊點滴; Wo De Ai Diao Dian Di)	2:58
4.	"Cold War" (冷戰; Leng Zhan)	4:55
5.	"Mars" (火星; Huo Xing)	4:04
6.	"Not Yet a Woman" (半熟宣言; Ban Shu Xuan Yan)	4:22
7.	"Love Me Please Shutup" (愛我請 Shutup; Ai Wo Qing Shutup)	3:39
8.	"The Smile in Your Arms" (在你懷裡的微笑; Zai Ni Huai Li De Wei Xiao)	4:07
9.	"Girls, I'm The Biggest" (女生我最大; Nu Sheng Wo Zui Da)	3:26
10.	"The Rhythm of Bliss" (幸福的節拍; Xing Fu De Jie Pai)	3:49
Total length:		36:25

Not Yet a Woman – DVD
No.	Title	Length
1.	"Take Me Away" (帶我走)
2.	"Too Much Trouble" (太煩惱)
3.	"Cold War" (冷戰)
4.	"My Love Drips and Drops" (我的愛吊點滴)
5.	"The Smile in Your Arms" (在你懷裡的微笑)

== Charts ==
Chart (2008)	Peak position
Taiwanese Albums (G-Music)	1

== Release history ==
Release history for Not Yet a Woman
Region	Date	Format(s)	Version	Label
Taiwan	November 7, 2008	CD; CD+DVD; digital download	Standard	Sony Music Taiwan
Taiwan	December 12, 2008	CD+DVD	Celebration special edition	Sony Music Taiwan
Taiwan	December 31, 2008	CD+DVD	Happy celebration edition	Sony Music Taiwan
