= Angel Wings (album) =

- Regular edition artwork

Studio album by Rainie Yang
- Released: August 23, 2013
- Recorded: 2013
- Genre: Pop
- Length: 39:20
- Language: Mandarin
- Label: Sony Music Taiwan

Rainie Yang chronology
Wishing for Happiness (2012)	Angel Wings (2013)	A Tale of Two Rainie (2014)

Singles from Angel Wings
- 1. "Angel Wings" Released: August 2, 2013; 2. "Brave Love" Released: August 19, 2013

Angel Wings (Chinese: 天使之翼; pinyin: Tian Shi Zhi Yi) is the eighth studio album by Taiwanese recording artist Rainie Yang. The album was released on August 23, 2013, by Sony Music Taiwan. It produced the singles "Angel Wings" and "Brave Love".

== Release ==
The album was released in three editions: regular, Love Letter Edition and Fantasy Land Edition. A special edition (天使之翼冠軍慶功熊抱版) was released on September 20, 2013, which includes a new 28-page photo lyric booklet, postcards and magnet.

== Music videos ==
Five music videos were released for the album: "Angel Wings" on August 8, "Brave Love" on August 18, "Busy Life" on September 4, "Kidnapped By Myself on September 17, and "A Short Break" on October 2, 2013.

== Track listing ==
Angel Wings track listing
No.	Title	Lyrics	Music	Length
1.	"Angel Wings" (天使之翼; Tiān shǐ zhī yì)	Qiu Sheng Lun, Wonderful	Qiu Sheng Lun	4:21
2.	"Kidnapped By Myself" (被自己綁架; Bèi zì jǐ bǎng jià)	Greeny Wu	Alex Zhang Jian	4:08
3.	"Loneliness is a Type of Security" (孤獨是一種安全感; Gū dú shì yī zhǒng ān quán gǎn)	Tanya Chua	Tanya Chua	4:01
4.	"Brave Love" (勇敢很好; Yǒng gǎn hěn hǎo)	Wesbou Wu, Wonderful	Chen Qi Le (Color)	4:51
5.	"Inverted" (顛倒; Diān dǎo)	Wesbou Wu	Alex Zhang Jian	3:22
6.	"Unblessed Happiness" (不被祝福的幸福; Bù bèi zhù fú de xìng fú)	Daryl Yao	Alex Zhang Jian	4:17
7.	"Cleverness" (小聰明; Xiǎo cōng míng)	Roel De Meulemeester, Anita Lixel, Luck 'B.T.' Tsui, Wonderful	Roel De Meulemeester, Anita Lixel	3:18
8.	"Gills" (魚鰓; Yú sāi)	Xiaohan	Lu Kang Wei	4:16
9.	"A Short Break" (一小節休息; Yī xiǎo jié xiū xi)	Greeny Wu	Wang Lan Yin	3:40
10.	"Busy Life" (匆忙人生; Cōng máng rén shēng)	Alex Zhang Jian	Alex Zhang Jian	3:06
Total length:				39:20

== Charts ==
Chart (2013)	Peak position
Taiwanese Albums (G-Music)	1

== Release history ==
Release history for Angel Wings
Region	Date	Format(s)	Version	Label
Various	August 23, 2013	Digital download; streaming	Standard	Sony Music Taiwan
Taiwan	August 23, 2013	CD	Standard	Sony Music Taiwan
Taiwan	September 20, 2013	CD; CD+DVD	Special edition	Sony Music Taiwan
