= Delete Reset Grow =

- Delete Reset Grow delete edition cover

Studio album by Rainie Yang
- Released: 27 November 2019
- Genre: Mandopop
- Language: Mandarin
- Label: EMI

Rainie Yang chronology
Traces of Time in Love 年輪說 (2016)	Delete Reset Grow (2019)	Like a Star (2020)

Singles from Delete Reset Grow
- 1. "Celebration Of Oneself (節日快樂)" Released: 12 November 2019; 2. "Delete, Reset (刪拾)" Released: 22 November 2019

Delete Reset Grow (Chinese: 刪‧拾 以後; pinyin: shān shí yǐ hòu) is the eleventh Mandarin studio album by Taiwanese Mandopop artist Rainie Yang. It was released on 27 November 2019 through EMI, her third album on the sublabel of Universal Music Taiwan.

This album marks Yang's first attempt at producing an album, with her taking the initiative in contacting the various songwriters. Thematically, the album discusses about the need to for one to 'delete' their weaknesses, 'reset' their courage, and 'grow' to become the best version of themselves.

The album's first single, "Celebration Of Oneself", was released on radio on Singles' Day. The lyrics of the song describe the loneliness that is felt during celebrations despite not being alone.

The album's title track, "Delete, Reset", was ranked 11th on Hit FM Top 100 Singles of the Year; "Celebration Of Oneself" and "Love is Love" were placed at 26th and 42nd respectively.

== Track listing ==
No.	Title	Lyrics	Music	Length
1.	"Celebration Of Oneself" (節日快樂; jié rì kuài lè)	Cheer Chen	Cheer Chen	4:58
2.	"Delete, Reset" (刪拾; shān shí)	Sandee Chan	Sandee Chan	4:19
3.	"Love is Love"	ØZI	ØZI	3:27
4.	"No Regret" (不可惜; bù kě xí)	Kang Lu (呂康惟)	Kang Lu	3:44
5.	"Fearless Love" (煉愛; liàn ài)	Lala Hsu	Lala Hsu	3:56
6.	"Embrace Your Imperfection" (獻醜; xiàn chǒu)	Chen Xin Yan (陳信延), Li Ronghao	Terrence Lam (林家謙)	3:29
7.	"Faces" (臉孔; liǎn kǒng)	Lumi Xu (許含光)	Zheng Yu Jie (鄭宇界)	4:51
8.	"Clueless" (空空; kōng kōng)	Waa Wei	Waa Wei, Han Li Kang (韓立康)	4:12
9.	"Nutrients" (泥土; ní tǔ)	Peggy Hsu	Peggy Hsu	3:37

=== Bonus ===
No.	Title	Lyrics	Music	Length
10.	"Stranger" (我不認識你; Ngo Bat Jing Sik Nei)	Chan Wing Him (陳詠謙)	Terrence Lam	3:29

Notes

- "Stranger" ("我不認識你") is the Cantonese version of "Embrace Your Imperfection" ("獻醜")

== Music videos ==
Song	Director	Release date	Notes	Ref
Celebration Of Oneself (節日快樂)	Rainie Yang, Jude Chen (陳映之)	19 November 2019		
Delete, Reset (刪拾)	Zhong Lin (鍾靈)	26 November 2019		
Love is Love	ØZI	5 December 2019	Featuring ØZI	
Embrace Your Imperfection (獻醜)	Jude Chen	19 December 2019	Shot in Paris	
Stranger (我不認識你)	—N/a	19 December 2019	Lyric MV with illustrations by NIN	
Fearless Love (煉愛)	Zhong Lin	9 January 2020		
No Regret (不可惜)	VeraSolaris	16 January 2020	Featuring Michelle Chen	
Nutrients (泥土)	Jude Chen	17 February 2020	Featuring Annie Chen, Ivy Shao, Sunnie Huang (黃小柔) and Windie Chang (張棋惠)	
Clueless (空空)	—N/a	13 April 2020	Featuring Mei Mei (美美), a character illustrated by Mr. H.H	
Faces (臉孔)	—N/a	5 June 2020	Lyric MV with illustrations by Rami (拉米)	
