= Miss No Good =

2008 Taiwanese television series

- Promotional poster
- Also known as: 不良笑花; Bù Liáng Xiào Huā
- Genre: Romance; Comedy
- Directed by: Zhang Boyu (張博昱)
- Starring: Rainie Yang; Will Pan; Michelle Chen; Dean Fujioka
- Opening theme: "夏日瘋" (Summer Craze) by Will Pan
- Ending theme: "帶我走" (Take Me Away) by Rainie Yang
- Country of origin: Taiwan
- Original language: Mandarin
- No. of episodes: 14

Production
- Producer: Chai Zhiping (柴智屏)
- Production location: Taipei
- Running time: 90 mins (Sundays at 22:00 - 23:30)
- Production company: Comic Ritz International Production

Original release
- Network: Chinese Television System (CTS)
- Release: 7 September – 7 December 2008

Related
- Honey & Clover (蜂蜜幸運草); Prince + Princess 2

Miss No Good (Chinese: 不良笑花; pinyin: bù liáng xiào huā) is a 2008 Taiwanese television series starring Rainie Yang, Will Pan and Dean Fujioka. It was produced by Comic Ritz International Production (可米瑞智國際藝能有限公司) with Chai Zhiping (柴智屏) as producer and directed by Zhang Boyu (張博昱).

The series was first broadcast in Taiwan on free-to-air Chinese Television System (CTS) (華視) from 7 September 2008 to 7 December 2008, every Sunday from 22:00 to 23:30 and cable TV Eastern Television (ETTV) (東森電視) from 13 September 2008 to 13 December 2008, every Saturday at 20:00 to 21:30.

== Synopsis ==
Xiaohua (Rainie Yang) is a bubbly girl with her own unique sense of style, and has no intention of changing the way on how she looks and dresses until the return of her elementary school classmate, Jia Sile (Dean Fujioka), convinces her otherwise. Jia Sile is deeply in love with Xiaohua, because of their history. He then does whatever he can to get Xiaohua to be his girlfriend, despite coming back to Taiwan for an arranged marriage with Jiang Mi (Michelle Chen).

One day, when her motorcycle broke down, Xiaohua meets Tang Men (Will Pan)-- the famous, poison-tongued stylist, who happens to be Jia Sile's best friend. The two share a taxi, only to argue over each other's sense of style which results in Tang Men angrily storming out, unwittingly leaving behind his set of expensive scissors.

Later, Jia Sile holds an elementary school reunion party and invites both Tang Men and Xiaohua. Tang Men meets Jiang Mi, who tells him that she and Si Le gave each other one year to find their true loves before submitting to his parents' will and marrying. After being pushed into a swimming pool and being told by her former classmates that she has no sense of style, Xiaohua decides she will change her image so as to prevent embarrassing Si Le.

The next day, when Tang Men's assistant comes to Xiaohua's shop to look for the lost pair of scissors, Xiaohua decides to use them to blackmail Tang Men and get him to teach her how to be an upper-class woman. As Tang Men and Xiaohua spend more time together, they slowly begin to realize their feelings for one another, though they initially denies them. Meanwhile, Jiang Mi, who is dating Tang Men, asks him to get close to Xiaohua so that she can get Si Le back. Tang Men, who had found Xiaohua annoying and loud, suddenly sees her inner beauty and falls in love with her without even realizing it.

Eventually, Jia Sile and Xiaohua began dating, much to the dislike of Jia Sile's mother, Ye An. However, things take a turn when Jia Sile finds out that Tang Men is in love with Xiaohua. They then each try to get her to love them. It is also later discovered that Ye An is actually Xiaohua's birth mother and therefore Xiaohua is Jia Sile's step-sister (as Ye An is his step-mother).

Tang Men is then offered a teaching position at a newly opened school in Germany and intends to ask Xiaohua to join him. Jia Sile, in his last attempt to win over Xiaohua, is preparing to propose to her at dinner when he got involved in a car accident and falls into a coma. Tang Men, filled with guilt over Jia Sile's current condition, decides that Jia Sile needs Xiaohua more than ever and decided to leave for Germany alone.

On the day of Tang Men's departure, Jia Sile awakens and realizes that Xiaohua and him are not suited for each other. He then tells Xiaohua to go after Tang Men. At the airport, Xiaohua finally confesses her love for Tang Men and begs him to stay in Taiwan, even though Tang Men had already signed the contract to go to Germany. Nonetheless, Xiaohua promises to wait for him.

2 years had passed by. Xiaohua had returned to her old ways, with her own unique style and curly hair. Jia Sile and Jiang Mi are now a happy couple and still stay in contact with Xiaohua. One chilly night in December, Xiaohua ends up sharing a cab with a stranger that actually turns out to be Tang Men. The story ends with Tang Men promising to return after another 3 years to marry Xiaohua.

== Cast ==
- Rainie Yang as Jiang Xiaohua (蔣小花) a.k.a. Miss Christmas Tree
- Will Pan as Tang Men (唐門)
- Dean Fujioka as Jia Sile (賈思樂)
- Michelle Chen as Jiang Mi (江蜜)
- Jian Chang as Jiang Dashu (蔣大樹)
- Wen Ying as Grandma Jiang (蔣阿嬷)
- Jay Shih as Dou Zi (豆子)
- Xiao Call
- Denny Huang as Lai Ruike (賴瑞克)
- Evonne Hsu as the Goddess in Xiaohua's dreams
- Chung Hsin-yu as Chu Ya-an (youth)

== Soundtrack ==
- Opening theme song: "夏日瘋" (Summer Craze) by Will Pan
- Ending theme song: "帶我走" (Take Me Away) by Rainie Yang

The track "夏日瘋" (Summer Craze) is listed at number 52 on Hit Fm Taiwan's Hit Fm Annual Top 100 Singles Chart (Hit-Fm年度百首單曲) for 2008.

Insert song

- "同一個遺憾" (Same Regret) by Will Pan and Blue J (紀佳松)
- "太煩惱" (Too Much Trouble) by Rainie Yang

Instrumental - released on Will's Future (Trend Expert limited Edition)

- "夏日瘋-鋼琴配樂版" (Summer Craze-piano version)
- "夏日瘋-吉他配樂版" (Summer Craze-guitar version)
- "同一個遺憾-鋼琴配樂版" (Same Regret-piano version)
- "同一個遺憾-吉他配樂版" (Same Regret-guitar version)

Note: The songs by Rainie Yang were released on her 4th album Not Yet a Woman and by Will Pan on his compilation album Will's Future (Trend Expert limited Edition).
