= Life Plan A and B =

- Promotional poster
- 植劇場－荼蘼
- Genre: Melodrama; Romance
- Written by: Mag Hsu
- Directed by: Wang Shaudi; Huang Tianren
- Starring: Rainie Yang; Yan Yulin; Johnny Lu
- Opening theme: "Traces of Time in Love 年輪說" by Rainie Yang
- Ending theme: "The Lessons of Love 相愛的方法" by Rainie Yang
- Country of origin: Taiwan
- Original languages: Mandarin; Taiwanese Hokkien
- No. of episodes: 6

Production
- Executive producer: Wang Shaudi
- Producers: Liao Jianxing; An Zheyi
- Production location: Taiwan
- Running time: 110 minutes Fridays 10:00–11:50 pm

Original release
- Network: TTV
- Release: October 7 – November 11, 2016

Related
- Love of Sandstorm; Jiang Teacher, You Talked About Love

Life Plan A and B (Chinese: 荼蘼; pinyin: Tú mí) is a 2016 Taiwanese melodrama created and produced by TTV. It stars Rainie Yang, Yan Yulin and Johnny Lu. It is the second instalment in Q Series. First original broadcast began on October 7, 2016 on TTV airing every Friday night from 10:00-11:50 pm.

== Synopsis ==
Ru Wei and You Yan have a simple relationship. But in every simple relationship there are many difficulties. They are not rich, but they try very hard to enjoy life; even if it means for their three meals a day they only eat instant noodles, they can still make hundreds of flavours. They are very serious about their relationship and trying their best to achieve something in life – hoping one day they can become who they want to become. One day, Ru Wei has a 'lucky chance' in life. Her company wants to send her to Shanghai, with a promotion and higher pay. These two who are deeply in love cannot bear to have a long distance relationship. With all the uncertainties in their future, can they still stand by each other? If your life "schedule" suddenly changes and forces you to choose between love and career, how can you choose one? Will you also be swaying between the two, unable to decide what to do? If only we can know the outcomes of both options before we choose one, how much better and easier would that be...

== Cast ==
- Rainie Yang as Zheng Ru-Wei
- Yan Yulin as Tang You-Yan
- Johnny Lu as Rong Yi-Chao, Ethan
  - Ru-Wei's supervisor in Shanghai
- Chang Fu-chien as Tang De-Gang
  - You Yan's father
- Chen Chi-hsia as Zhou Ya-Qing
  - You Yan's mother
- Andy Wu as Zhao Hui
- Ricie Fun as Gao Mei-Yu
- Hsieh Ying-hsuan as Ms. Zhang
- Diane Lin as Tang You-Shan
  - You-Yan's younger sister
- Heaven Hai as Real estate agent

== Soundtrack ==
- Opening theme: "Traces of Time in Love 年輪說" by Rainie Yang
- Ending theme: "The Lessons of Love 相愛的方法" by Rainie Yang
- "Being Single 單" by Rainie Yang
- "How Sad 多難得" by Yvonne Hsieh

== Episode ratings ==
Air date	Episode	Average ratings	Rank
October 7, 2016	1	0.57	4
October 14, 2016	2	0.56	4
October 21, 2016	3	0.67	4
October 28, 2016	4	0.64	4
November 4, 2016	5	0.64	4
November 11, 2016	6	0.92	3
Average ratings		0.66	-

== Awards and nominations ==
Year	Ceremony	Category	Nominee	Result
2017	22nd Asian Television Awards	Best Original Screenplay	Mag Hsu	Won
2017	52nd Golden Bell Awards	Best Leading Actress in a Television Series	Rainie Yang	Nominated
2017	52nd Golden Bell Awards	Best Supporting Actor in a Television Series	Johnny Lu	Nominated
2017	52nd Golden Bell Awards	Best Writing for a Television Series	Mag Hsu	Nominated
2017	12th Seoul International Drama Awards	Best Mini-series	Life Plan A and B	Nominated
