= Meeting Love =

Studio album by Rainie Yang
- Released: 17 March 2006
- Genre: Mandopop
- Length: 42:07
- Language: Mandarin
- Label: Sony Music Taiwan

Rainie Yang chronology
My Intuition (2005)	Meeting Love (2006)	My Other Self (2007)

Alternative cover

Meeting Love (Chinese: 遇上愛; pinyin: Yù shàng ài) is the second studio album by Taiwanese singer Rainie Yang. It was released by Sony Music Taiwan on 17 March 2006.

It was available for pre-order and two editions were released including the Meeting Love (Lovely Celebration Edition), which includes four music videos and 40 minutes of highlight footage of Rainie Yang Meeting Love Celebration Concert (楊丞琳遇上愛慶功演唱會). The album includes a duet, "甜心咒" (Sweet Curse) with label-mate Evan Yo.

== Reception ==
The tracks "遇上愛" (Meeting Love) and "慶祝" (Celebration) were nominated for Top 10 Gold Songs at the Hong Kong TVB8 Awards, presented by television station TVB8, in 2006.

The track, "遇上愛" (Meeting Love) won one of the Top 10 Songs of the Year at the 2007 HITO Radio Music Awards presented by Taiwanese radio station Hit FM.

The album was awarded one of the Top 10 Selling Mandarin Albums of the Year at the 2006 IFPI Hong Kong Album Sales Awards, presented by the Hong Kong branch of IFPI. It is the sixth best selling album in Taiwan in 2006 with 78,000 copies sold.

== Track listing ==
1. "甜心咒" Tian Xin Zhou (Sweet Curse) - feat Evan Yo
2. "可愛" Ke Ai (Cute)
3. "遇上愛" Yu Shang Ai (Meeting Love)
4. "左邊" Zuo Bian (On The Left)
5. "找不到" Zhao Bu Dao (Can't Find It)
6. "慶祝" Qing Zhu (Celebration); cover of Love Song by 7Princess, which was in turn a cover of Salut d'Amour by Edward Elgar
7. "芥末巧克力" Jie Mo Qiao Ke Li (Mustard Chocolate)
8. "失眠的睡美人" Shi Mian De Shui Mei Ren (Sleeping Beauty's Insomnia)
9. "自然而然" Zi Ran Er Ran (Automatically)
10. "過敏" Guo Min (Over-Sensitive)

== Music videos ==
1. "甜心咒" (Sweet Curse) MV - feat Evan Yo
2. "可愛" (Cute) MV
3. "遇上愛" (Meeting Love) MV
4. "左邊" (On The Left) MV
5. "找不到" (Can't Find It) MV
6. "慶祝" (Celebration) MV
7. "芥末巧克力" (Mustard Chocolate) MV
8. "失眠的睡美人" (Sleeping Beauty's Insomnia) MV
9. "過敏" (Over-Sensitive) MV

== Releases ==
Two versions (excludes pre-order editions) were released by Sony Music Taiwan:

- 17 March 2006 - Meeting Love (Preorder Edition) (CD) - includes gifts
- 17 March 2006 - Meeting Love (CD)
- 5 May 2006 - Meeting Love (Lovely Celebration Edition) (遇上愛 可愛慶功版) (CD+DVD) - includes four music videos and 40 minutes of highlight footage from Rainie Yang Meeting Love Celebration Concert (楊丞琳遇上愛慶功演唱會).
1. "慶祝" (Celebration) MV
2. "過敏" (Over-Sensitive) MV
3. "遇上愛" (Meeting Love) MV
4. "可愛" (Cute) MV
5. 40 minutes of highlight footage from Rainie Yang Meeting Love Celebration Concert
