= Longing For =

- Blue Sky Edition cover

Studio album by Rainie Yang
- Released: July 29, 2011
- Recorded: 2011
- Genres: Pop; pop rock
- Length: 38:53
- Language: Mandarin
- Label: Sony Music Taiwan

Rainie Yang chronology
Whimsical World Collection (2010)	Longing For (2011)	Wishing for Happiness (2012)

Singles from Longing For
- 1. "We Are All Silly" Released: July 14, 2011; 2. "Longing For" Released: July 29, 2011

Longing For (Chinese: 仰望; pinyin: yǎng wàng) is the sixth studio album by Taiwanese recording artist Rainie Yang. It was released on July 29, 2011, by Sony Music Taiwan with two covers: a Blue Sky Edition and Starry Night Edition.

== Singles ==
The lead single "We Are All Silly" premiered on radio stations in Taiwan and Asia on July 14, 2011. It was used as an insert song for the Taiwanese drama Love You starring Yang and Joseph Chang, who also featured in the music video of this song.

== Track listing ==
Longing For – Standard edition
No.	Title	Length
1.	"Longing For" (仰望)	3:34
2.	"We Are All Silly" (我們都傻)	5:30
3.	"Imperfect Love" (缺陷美)	4:08
4.	"Lovelution"	3:27
5.	"Fast Forward" (快轉)	4:33
6.	"A Beautiful Scar" (結痂)	3:03
7.	"Making a Difference" (轉彎)	3:29
8.	"Happiness" (幸福預兆)	3:58
9.	"The Summer in Spain" (曬焦的一雙耳朵)	4:09
10.	"Happy Ending" (一個人的 Happy Ending)	3:02
Total length:		38:53

Longing For – DVD
No.	Title	Length
1.	"Love Fool" (我們都傻)
2.	"Longing For" (仰望)
3.	"Imperfect Love" (缺陷美)
4.	"The Summer in Spain" (曬焦的一雙耳朵)

== Charts ==
Chart (2011)	Peak position
Taiwanese Albums (G-Music)	1

== Release history ==
Release history for Longing For
Region	Date	Format(s)	Label
Various	July 29, 2011	Digital download; streaming	Sony Music Taiwan
Taiwan	July 29, 2011	CD; CD+DVD	Sony Music Taiwan
