= Mitsuba Takanashi =

Japanese manga creator

Mitsuba Takanashi (高梨 みつば, Takanashi Mitsuba; born May 27, 1975, in Shimane Prefecture) is a Japanese manga artist. She made her debut in 1992 at the age of 17 in Bessatsu Margaret with "Koi nante nai."

== List of works ==
- Tenshi no Poketto (天使のポケット, Angel's Pocket) (1997, Shueisha)
- Ohisama no Hana (おひさまの花, Flowers of the Sun) (1998, Shueisha)
- Akuma de Sōrō (悪魔で候) (1999, Shueisha); English translation: The Devil Does Exist (2005, CMX Manga)
- Beniiro Hero (紅色HERO) (2003, Shueisha); English translation: Crimson Hero (2005, Viz Media)
- Sumika Sumire (スミカスミレ) (2014, Shueisha); English translation: (2026, Shueisha)
- Otome Tsubaki wa Warawanai (乙女椿は笑わない) (2019, Shueisha); English translation: Otome Tsubaki Never Laughs (2026, Shueisha)
