= Love at Second Sight (2014 film) =

Chinese television drama series

- Genre: Romance
- Written by: Liu Rui Xuan
- Directed by: Ke He Chen 柯翰辰
- Starring: Zheng Kai; Rainie Yang; Michael Zhang; Yang Yi Tong; Ivy Shao
- Opening theme: "愛的鼓勵" (Encouragement of Love) by JJ Lin
- Ending theme: "下個轉彎是你嗎" (Would it be you on the next turn) by Rainie Yang
- Country of origin: Republic of China
- Original language: Mandarin
- No. of episodes: 27

Production
- Producer: Ke Yiqin
- Production location: Zhengzhou (China)

Original release
- Network: Hunan Broadcasting System
- Release: 10 August 2014

Related
- ShenZhen (深圳合租记)

Love at Second Sight
- Traditional Chinese: 一見不鍾情
- Simplified Chinese: 一见不钟情
- Literal meaning: Not Love at First Sight
Transcriptions
Standard Mandarin
- Hanyu Pinyin: Yī jiàn bù zhōng qíng

Love at Second Sight (Chinese: 一見不鍾情; pinyin: Yi Jian Bu Zhong Qing) is a 2014 Chinese drama starring Zheng Kai, Rainie Yang and Michael Zhang. Filming began on 20 February 2014 and wrapped in end of April. It was filmed on Zhengzhou, China.

== Cast ==
=== Main cast ===
Actor	Character	Description
Zheng Kai	Lu Zhe Xi (路哲熙)	
Rainie Yang	Fei Luo Luo (費洛洛)	
Michael Zhang	Tan Li Jie (譚禮傑)	
Yang Yi Tao	Fan Rui Zhi (范瑞芝)	
Ivy Shao	Tan Xiao Min (譚小敏)	

=== Supporting cast ===
Actor	Character	Description
Kelly Niu Tien	Shen Man Jiang (沈曼江)	
Dong Ke Fei	Hao Jiong (郝囧)	
Gao Ruo Xin	Peter	
Ji Ning	Zheng Wei Hua (鄭偉華)	
Wei Zhong Kai	Zhuang Zhuang (壯壯)	
Wang Kan Wei	Tan Bo Yu (譚伯渝)	
Ren Luo Min	Fei Zheng Hua (費正文)	
Li Ze Kai	Lei Lei (磊磊)	
Yanting Ma	Jenny	

== Soundtrack ==
Music	Song	Singer	Lyrics	Music
Opening song	愛的鼓勵 (Encouragement of Love)	JJ Lin	Wu Tsing-Fong	JJ Lin
Ending song	下個轉彎是你嗎 (Would it be you after the next turn)	Rainie Yang	Wu Tsing-Fong	Wu Tsing-Fong
Insert songs	我想爱 (I want to love)	Rainie Yang	Ge Da Wei	Dou Zhi Wen
Insert songs	佔據幸福 (Occupy happiness)	Lee Jia Wei	Na Cai Zhen	You Zheng Hao

== Reception ==
Hunan Broadcasting System Ratings
Episode	Original Broadcast Date	Average	Viewers' share	Rank
1-2	10 August 2014	1.238	3.42	1
3-5	11 August 2014	1.70	5.25	1

== International broadcast ==
- It began airing in Vietnam from November 27, 2016 on VTV3 under the title Không phải tiếng sét ái tình.
