= 4 in Love (group) =

Taiwanese all-female pop group

- clockwise from top left: Cloudie, Sunnie, Windie, Rainie
- Years active: 2000–2002
- Awards: Malaysian Golden Melody Awards; 2001 Most Adored Artiste, Silver (Who's Afraid of Who?)
- Musical career
- Genres: Mandopop
- Label: BMG
- Past members: Cloudie Ling, Sunnie Huang, Rainie Yang, Windie Chang

4 in Love was a Taiwanese all-female pop group. In 2000, BMG recruited four girls between the ages of 16 and 19, and named them 4 in Love.

Ling Chia-lin (冷嘉琳), Huang Hsiao-rou (黃小柔), Yang Cheng-lin (楊丞琳), and Chang Chi-huey (張棋惠) were each given new names based on different weather types: Cloudie, Sunnie, Rainie, and Windie, respectively. The label's strategy for the group was to promote their doll-like voices, and market them as "The World's First 3D Group".

The music video for their first lead single, "Fall in Love", was a first in the Taiwanese music industry for its use of three-dimensional computer animations. In 2001, their second and last album, Who's Afraid of Whom?, earned them a Silver Award in the Most Adored Artiste category at the Malaysian Golden Melody Awards.

Although Rainie's appearance in the hit drama Meteor Garden raised the group's profile, 4 in Love's popularity was still questionable at best. At the group's first autograph session, only a handful of fans showed up. Their songs, with the exception of "1001 Wishes" (一千零一個願望), were rarely successful on music charts. In 2002, the group was disbanded as investment in their label was pulled after the 1999 Jiji earthquake and the all artistes under the label were terminated from their contracts.

On 25 February 2018, the group reunited and performed at Rainie's concert as a special guest.

== Discography ==
=== Albums ===
- Fall In Love (November 27, 2000)
- 誰怕誰 Who's Afraid of Whom? (July 19, 2001)
