= Devil Beside You =

2005 Taiwanese drama

- DVD cover art
- Also known as: 惡魔在身邊; Èmó zài shēnbiān Devil Beside Me
- Genre: Romance, comedy
- Based on: The Devil Does Exist by Mitsuba Takanashi
- Directed by: Lin He Long (林合隆)
- Starring: Rainie Yang; Mike He; Kingone Wang
- Opening theme: "臭男人" (Jerk) by Huang YiDa
- Ending theme: "曖昧" (Ambiguous) by Rainie Yang
- Country of origin: Republic of China (Taiwan)
- Original language: Mandarin
- No. of episodes: 20

Production
- Producer: Chai Zhi Ping (柴智屏)
- Production locations: Taipei, Taiwan
- Running time: 90 mins (Sundays at 22:00)
- Production company: Comic Ritz International Production

Original release
- Network: China Television (CTV)
- Release: 26 June – 18 September 2005

Related
- 雙璧傳說; It Started with a Kiss

Devil Beside You (Chinese: 惡魔在身邊; pinyin: Èmó zài shēnbiān) is a 2005 Taiwanese drama starring Mike He, Rainie Yang and Kingone Wang. It is based on the Japanese manga The Devil Does Exist by Mitsuba Takanashi. It was produced by Comic Ritz International Production with Chai Zhi Ping (柴智屏) as producer and directed by Lin He Long (林合隆). The series was first broadcast in Taiwan on free-to-air China Television (CTV) (中視) from 26 June to 18 September 2005 and cable TV Eastern Television (ETTV) (東森) for 20 episodes.

== Synopsis ==
The story begins with Qi Yue (Rainie Yang) planning to confess her feelings to the basketball team captain, Yuan Yi (Kingone Wang). She writes a love letter and plans to pass it to him. However, due to her careless nature, she makes her confession to the wrong person, who happens to be the school's 'devil' or troublemaker, Ah Mon, who is her junior and a first-year student in school. Qi Yue is so shocked and embarrassed to see Jiang Meng aka Ah Mon's (Mike He) face that she drops her love letter in front of Ah Mon and runs away. Ah Mon picks up the letter.

Ah Mon is amused by the situation and decides to tease Qi Yue. He threatens Qi Yue to print a thousand copies of her love letter and let the whole school know of her feelings for Yuan Yi. In order to stop Ah Mon, Qi Yue agrees to be his gofer, to do his errands and bidding.

With Ah Mon's continuous bullying of Qi Yue, she is driven to stop all the tormenting by properly confessing her feelings to Yuan Yi again. Which makes Ah Mon unable to continue blackmailing her. To Qi Yue's surprise, Yuan Yi admits he has similar feelings for her.

While Qi Yue assumes that the whole ordeal with Ah Mon is going to end, she receives another piece of bad news—her mom is going to marry the school's chairman who is also Ah Mon's father, making Ah Mon her stepbrother.

Qi Yue's love letter is put up on the school notice board, and she assumes that it is Ah Mon who did it. She confronts him and storms off. After realizing that she has misunderstood Ah Mon, she apologizes to Ah Mon and pleads him to hit her so that she feels better—Ah Mon kisses her instead. Yuan Yi happens to see them kissing and confronts them. Ah Mon yells at Yuan Yi, saying that he wants Qi Yue. After Yuan Yi runs away in anger, Qi Yue looks at Ah Mon and begins to sob. After Qi Yue walks away in tears, Ah Mon feels guilty.

Yuan Yi regrets not believing in Qi Yue and returns to her, asking her out on a date. Qi Yue agrees happily. On their first date, they meet Ah Mon again. Qi Yue and Ah Mon have some misunderstandings, and they go separate ways.

After the date, Qi Yue goes home. However, on the way, she faints and is saved by Ah Mon's father. He brings her to his house to take care of her while her mom is away on a trip. Ah Mon and Qi Yue meet again at his house. She knows from Yuan Yi that she misunderstood Ah Mon again. Seeing Ah Mon had injured his hand, Qi Yue offers to clean the wounds for him. Sitting on Ah Mon's bed and putting medicine on his hand, she realizes Ah Mon is staring at her intensely, and this makes her heart pound. Later, Qi Yue wakes up and finds herself sleeping on Ah Mon's bed. Apparently, both have fallen asleep and Ah Mon's father has carried her to his bed.

Qi Yue finally realizes that the person she likes is Ah Mon. She tells Yuan Yi the truth and walks away. In the evening, she sits alone at the playground, crying softly to herself for hurting Yuan Yi. Ah Mon finds her and comforts her. She takes a ride on Ah Mon's bicycle. They have a minor accident, both falling on the road, but end up unharmed. Qi Yue asks Ah Mon why it is always so dangerous to be with him. Ah Mon replies to her that he cannot stop the dangers, but he will protect her. Ah Mon kisses Qi Yue passionately on the road.

Due to their relationship as future step siblings, they keep their romantic relationship in the dark. Except for some close friends of Ah Mon & Qi Yue, nobody knows of their relationship.

Ah Mon's friend, Yang Ping, who is in love with Li Xiang, is unhappy to see Ah Mon and Qi Yue together. He wants to get rid of Qi Yue so that Ah Mon can be with Li Xiang. At the school's rooftop, he ambushes Qi Yue and wants to kill her. Li Xiang hesitantly tells Ah Mon of Yang Ping's plan and Ah Mon rushes to Qi Yue's rescue. He beats up Yang Ping and brings Qi Yue home. At home, Qi Yue confesses her liking to Ah Mon, and he hugs her, saying that he is happy to know she likes him.

On another day, a "sweet-looking" boy comes to Qi Yue and confesses his feelings towards her. This shocks Qi Yue and her whole class, and he further states that he wants her to convey a message to her boyfriend that he wants Qi Yue for himself, revealing his name to be Ah Rang.

Yuan Yi mentions this to Ah Mon, and he storms away in anger. In the evening, he tells Qi Yue that nobody is more confident than he is in liking her, and she belongs to him only. Qi Yue smiles at his possessiveness.

Qi Yue goes to Da Zhi High School to look for Ah Rang and realizes that he is Ah Mon's younger brother. Yuan Yi tells Ah Mon about this, and Ah Mon storms off to look for Qi Yue. At seeing Ah Rang and Qi Yue, he trips Ah Rang and makes him fall to the ground. Ah Mon grabs Qi Yue's arm and walks away. He does not want to talk about his brother at all. Ah Rang is actually harmless, and his only intention is to attract Ah Mon's attention. He longs for his brother's affection. While arguing with Ah Mon, Ah Rang suffers an asthma attack and Ah Mon rushes him to the hospital. Both brothers patch up. Ah Mon is then told that Qi Yue fainted in the hospital. Ah Mon runs to her. At her home, Ah Mon reprimands Qi Yue for being a busybody and tiring herself out, which is the cause of her fatigue. Ah Mon's concern for her makes Qi Yue happy.

Ah Mon's relationship with Ah Rang is better, so when Ah Rang gets bullied, Ah Mon comes to his rescue. Ah Mon threatens the bullies and they run away because they were outnumbered as Ah Mon brought along his group of friends. Later, the bullies come after Ah Rang, but Ah Mon takes them all on without Ah Rang's knowledge. Ah Mon defeats them all with ease, but then the bullies use a car to hit him. This causes Ah Mon to get hurt, and it affects his basketball skills on the court.

Ah Mon's grandmother suspects that Ah Mon and Qi Yue are seeing each other. She plans to arrange Ah Mon with a rich girl, Mei Di, which Qi Yue makes feel sad and uncertain. At the same time, Qi Yue's first love reappears as her school lecturer (Ah Sen). This causes Ah Mon to be jealous, and he feels insecure. Ah Mon rejects Mei Di and she left wishing Qi Yue and him happiness. Similarly, Qi Yue tells Ah Sen that she likes Ah Mon, and he goes back to his girlfriend.

Following that adventure, Ah Mon and Qi Yue take advantage of their parents' out of town trip to travel to see Qi Yue's father's grave. They get caught in a rainstorm and discover that the train is not running. Ah Mon gets a hotel room, but Qi Yue can't stand the tension and makes the trip back home to find her mother waiting for her. She finally confesses that she and Ah Mon are a couple. Since this is going to be a problem for the family, her mother decides that they will have to move out of the house. However, when she faints, they find out that she's pregnant. Though it isn't proper, they decide that they will support Ah Mon and Qi Yue's relationship and continue their own.

While things seem to be going fine again, Ah Mon's mom comes back and wants Ah Mon to follow her to Italy. At playground, Ah Mon tells Qi Yue that she can continue to date other people while he is away, but he will always only like her. They attend their parents' wedding a few days afterward. Ah Mon tells Qi Yue that he will definitely come back to her. And she decides to wait for him.

Later that year, at Christmastime, Qi Yue goes out to get a part for the Christmas Tree that Ah Mon gave her the previous year. While she is out, she's grabbed off the street and blindfolded, thrown in the trunk of a car and taken to another location. It is a prank, orchestrated by Ah Mon's friends. When she takes off her blindfold, Ah Mon is standing in front of her. He tells Qi Yue that he's back, and they kiss.

== Characters ==
=== Major characters ===
Drama character	Actor	Manga character	Characteristics
Jiang Meng aka Ah Mon (江猛)	Mike He	Takeru Edogawa	He is the son of the president of the school. He is a freshman at the college, yet he has power over his teachers because of his father's position. Ah Mon is also frightening to a lot of people and is known to bully girls, yet he is also known as the "prince of seduction". Despite his cool composure and "bad" attitude, Ah Meng has a gentle side and often sticks up for what is right. Li Xiang has a crush on him, which he does not reciprocate, but Ah Mon has feelings for Qi Yue. Although she is his future stepsister (elder), he does love her and enjoys teasing her. He knows that she loves him but gets jealous when he finds out that there are new people that are pursuing her. Ah Mon also joins the basketball team and has faster reflexes than rival Yuan Yi's. Ah Mon also has a little brother.
Qi Yue (齊悅)	Rainie Yang	Kayano Saitou	She is a sweet and innocent sophomore in college who lives with her widowed mother. She is shy and sometimes clueless, but has a loyal and kind heart that shines even through the toughest of times. She harbors a crush on the captain of the basketball team, Yuan Yi, but her life is turned upside-down by Ah Mon. Eventually, she falls out of love with Yuan Yi and starts developing feelings for Ah Mon. She constantly worries about him and their relationship becoming discovered. Qi Yue is also one of the managers of the basketball team. Although it hurts for her to accept that Ah Mon is her future step brother, she still continues to love the devil boy.
Shang Yuan Yi (尚源伊)	Kingone Wang	Kamijou Yuuichi	He is a boy in Qi Yue's class (teasingly nicknamed "Ah Yi (Auntie in Chinese)", and is the captain of the basketball team. Qi Yue is initially in love with Yuan Yi for his gentle personality. Yuan Yi reciprocates her feelings and they become a couple. When Qi Yue falls in love with Ah Mon, she breaks up with Yuan Yi, wishing not to lead him on. Yuan Yi is angry and hostile towards Ah Mon at first, but gets over it and realizes his feelings for Qing Zi after she kisses him and he admits that he has feelings towards Qi Yue but he also knows he has no more chance with Qi Yue because of Ah Mon.
Qing Zi (晴紫)	Tsai Pei Lin (蔡裴琳)	Harukawa Kyoko	She is Qi Yue's outspoken best friend. She and Xiao Cai are the ones who encourages Qi Yue to confess her love to Yuan Yi, even though Qing Zi herself has a crush on him. Qing Zi cares for Qi Yue a lot and spends a lot of effort in helping her. After Qi Yue and Yuan Yi break up, Qing Zi starts dating Yuan Yi. Qing Zi and Yuan Yi's relationship is tested when Qing Zi feels that Yuan Yi is spending more time playing basketball than being with her. Feeling dejected, she meets with a stranger she chatted with online. She later gets into a tussle with him and Yuan Yi comes to her rescue instead of playing in the team's basketball match. When her father gets a new job, he forces her to emigrate with him, taking her away from Yuan Yi and her friends. Yuan Yi, in order to keep her with him, challenges her father, a skilled swordsman.
Xiao Cai (小彩)	Fu Xiao Yun (傅小芸)	Nanachan	She is Qi Yue and Qing Zi's friend. She and Qing Zi were the ones who supported Qi Yue to confess her love to Yuan Yi. Unlike Qing Zi, Xiao Cai appears to be more calm. She also alerted Yuan Yi of Qing Zi's escapade with the stranger because she was worried about Qing Zi's safety.
Xin Li Xiang (辛莉香)	Ivy Fan (范筱梵)	Rika Moroboshi	In high school, she was an anti-social girl and acted snotty to all the girls in the class. Whenever she got bullied, Ah Mon would protect her. Li Xiang has also developed a crush on Ah Mon, calling him "Prince". She would do anything to get Ah Monto notice her. She would even go as far as hiring girls to beat her up so Ah Mon could "save" her. Finally she realizes that this is not the way to get him to love her. Yang Ping had a crush on her and she then starts to have feelings for him and goes out with him.
Yu Yang Ping (于陽平)	Masuyama Yuki	Youhei	He is Ah Mon's best friend who supports him. He used to be mocked by the middle school basketball teacher because he was overweight and he could not play well. Ah Mon was defensive and protective over him and he beat up the teacher. This led them to becoming good friends. He has feelings for Li Xiang, but she has a crush on Ah Mon. He is willing to do anything for her, even trying to beat up Qi Yue. Li Xiang then starts to develop feelings for him and they start to go out.
Yuan Chuan Rang aka Ah Rang (袁川讓)	Figaro Ceng	Yuzuru	He is Ah Mon's younger brother. Their father tried desperately to forget about him and named Ah Mon as the successor of the company. Ah Rang follows and stalks Qi Yue everywhere, trying to force her and blackmail her into liking him. She, in turn, does everything she can to stop him. Ah Rang tries to ruin Ah Mon name and puts Ah Mon and Qi Yue in much danger. He is later softened by Qi Yue, who later feels sorry for him and reaches out to him and becomes more open. Ah Rang really looks up to Ah Mon, sees him as a hero, and actually cares deeply about him. He also tried to act like him, which caused him to get bullied and beaten up in school. Ah Mon then teaches him how to protect himself and fight his bullies. His mother chose him instead of Ah Mon when his parents divorced, causing Ah Mon to envy his younger brother. Ah Mon would often ignore him, refuse to look at him, and act coldly toward him. Ah Rang is also helped by the university president's assistant, who is in love with Ah Rang's mother. Ah Rang's mother does not reciprocate those feelings. Plus, Ah Mon accidentally shoved Ah Rang into a vase that had severely injured and cut his neck when they were young. Ah Mon felt really sorry for his younger brother over the years. Because of this injury, he usually was weak and would collapse when he struggled to breathe. He has asthma and after a "fake" attack, he and Ah Mon rekindle their relationship and become brothers once more.
Liu Mei Di (劉美蒂)	Katherine Wang Kai Di (王凱蒂)		A girl who Ah Mon saved when she dropped her glasses in the middle of a road. He took her to an optician and bought her new glasses. She never got a good sight of him when she broke her glasses, but she fell in love with him anyways. Coincidentally, Ah Mon's grandmother arranged a marriage for him and Mei Di to try to break Ah Mon and Qi Yue apart. Mei Di is well-sheltered and everyone thinks she is cute and innocent because of her appearance. Ah Mon is the only person, besides blunt Li Xiang, that didn't give her what she wants. This is one of the reasons Mei Di loves Ah Mon so much. She also has anemia, which makes her dependent on chocolate, notably Ferrero Rocher. She always carries a box in her bag. She likes to give out chocolates to thank people for their kindness.
Tian Si Shen (田思慎)	Matt Wu	Shin Fujita	Qi Yue's first crush. He was her father's student when they were younger. He and Qi Yue had spent a lot of time together, and he was her mentor. She had always said when she was younger that she wanted to marry him when she grew up. Ah Sen studied overseas for some time. When he came back, he became a substitute professor for a short while at her college. He also became the basketball team coach. Though he has a girlfriend, he harbors feelings for Qi Yue. Once he learned Qi Yue is not the same girl she used to be and is in a relationship with Ah Mon, Ah Sen then tries to get back with his former girlfriend.

=== Minor characters ===
Drama character	Actor	Relationships
Jiang You Hui (江友暉)	He Du Lin	Ah Meng & Ah Rang's father
Huang Xue Wei (黃雪薇)	Ge Wei Ru (戈偉如)	Qi Yu's mother
Yè Yī Láng aka Yĕ Láng (葉一郎/野狼)	Huáng Xīng Lún (黃星綸)	Ah Meng's gang
Líng Mù (鈴木)	Cài Rú Zhì (蔡襦鋕)	Ah Meng's gang
Guo Kai (郭凱)	Yuan Jun Hao	Ah Meng's gang
Chui Ming (椎名)	Wang Jian Min	Teacher
Grandma Jiang (江奶奶)	Tang Qi	Ah Meng & Ah Rang's grandmother
Yuan Mei Jin (袁美津)	Meng Ting Li (孟庭麗)	Ah Meng & Ah Rang's mother
Chuang Ya Lin (莊亞莉)	Janel Tsai (蔡淑臻)	Ah Sen's girlfriend

== Multimedia ==
=== Music ===
- Opening Theme: "臭男人" Chou Nan Ren (Jerk) by Huang Yida
- Ending Theme: "曖昧" Ai Mei (Ambiguous) by Rainie Yang

Insert songs

- "月亮代表我的心" Yue Liang Dai Biao Wo De Xin (The Moon Represents My Heart) – David Tao
- "Set Me Free" – Huang Yida
- "一秒的安慰" Yi Miao De An Wei (A Moment's Consolation) – Huang Yida
- "理想情人" Li Xiang Qing Ren (Ideal Lover) – Rainie Yang
- "An Rao Siao" – XL
- "Mei Li De Hway Yi" (Chorus Version) – XL

=== Books ===
Name	Author	Publisher	Published date	ISBN
Devil Beside You TV Drama Novel 惡魔在身邊電視小說	Lan Hu / Leng Gan	Chun Tian	22 July 2005	ISBN 986-7494-82-2
Devil Beside You Photobook 惡魔在身邊寫真書	Ke Mi Fu Ya	Jiao Chuan Shu Dian	13 Sept 2005	ISBN 986-7189-52-3

== Remake ==
It was remade in Indonesia as Benar Benar Cinta.

== International Broadcast ==
It was aired in the Philippines on GMA Network from February 18, 2008, to April 18, 2008, entitled Devil Beside Me.
