= My Other Self =

Studio album by Rainie Yang
- Released: 7 September 2007
- Genre: Mandopop
- Length: 39:20
- Label: Sony Music Taiwan

Rainie Yang chronology
Meeting Love (2006)	My Other Self (2007)	Not Yet a Woman (2008)

Alternative cover

My Other Self (Chinese: 任意門; pinyin: Rènyì mén; lit. 'anywhere door') is the third studio album by Taiwanese singer Rainie Yang. It was released by Sony Music Taiwan on 7 September 2007. A second edition, My Other Self (Special Collectible Edition) (CD+DVD), was released on 18 October 2007 with a bonus DVD which contains five music videos.

The album features ten tracks, which includes "缺氧" (Lacking Oxygen), the ending theme and "完美比例" (Perfect Example), an insert song of Taiwanese drama, Why Why Love, starring Rainie Yang, Mike He and Kingone Wang.

== Reception ==
The album debuted at number one on Taiwan's G-Music Weekly Top 20 Mandarin and Combo Charts; and Five Music Chart at week 36 (7 to 13 September) with a percentage sales of 18.86%, 10.11%, and 18.55% respectively.

The track "缺氧" (Lacking Oxygen) is listed at number 64 on Hit Fm Taiwan's Hit Fm Annual Top 100 Singles Chart (Hit-Fm年度百首單曲) for 2007 and also was nominated for Top 10 Gold Songs at the Hong Kong TVB8 Awards, presented by television station TVB8, in 2007.

== Track listing ==
1. "狼來了" Lang Lai Le (Wolf Coming)
2. "任意門" Ren Yi Men (Magic Door)
3. "缺氧" Que Yang (Lacking Oxygen) - ending theme song of Why Why Love
4. "倔強" Jue Qiang (Stubborn)
5. "帽子戲法" Mao Zi Xi Fa (Hat Trick)
6. "你是壞人" Ni Shi Huai Ren (You Are A Bad Guy) - cover of Love Me(千面女孩) by Lee Jung Hyun (李貞賢)
7. "第二個自己" Di Er Ge Zi Ji (The Second Me)
8. "幸福果子" Xing Fu Guo Zi (Fruit Of Happiness)
9. "完美比例" Wan Mei Bi Li (Perfect Proportion) - insert song of Why Why Love
10. "學會" Xue Hui (Learned)

== Music videos ==
- "狼來了" Lang Lai Le (Wolf Coming) MV
- "任意門" Ren Yi Men (Anywhere Door) MV
- "缺氧" Que Yang (Lacking Oxygen) MV
- "倔強" Jue Qiang (Stubborn) MV
- "完美比例" Wan Mei Bi Li (Perfect Proportion) MV
