= Rainie Yang =

Taiwanese actress and singer (born 1984)

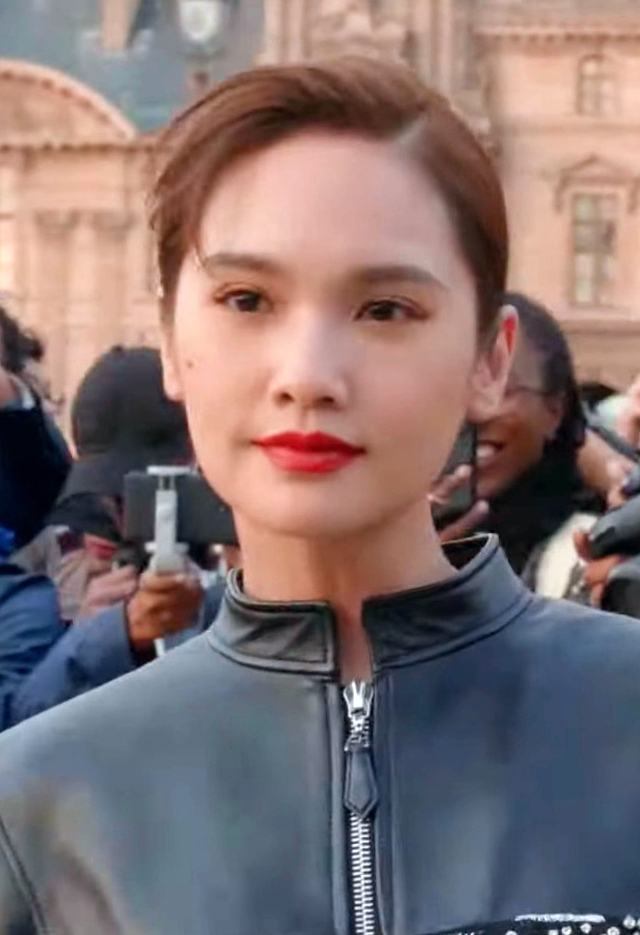
- Yang in 2019
- Born: 4 June 1984 (age 42); Taipei, Taiwan
- Occupations: Singer, actress, television host
- Years active: 2000–present
- Spouse: Li Ronghao (m. 2019)
- Musical career
- Genre: Mandopop
- Instrument: Vocals
- Label: Universal Music Taiwan (2019–present)
- Formerly of: 4 in Love

Chinese name
- Traditional Chinese: 楊丞琳
- Simplified Chinese: 杨丞琳
Transcriptions
Standard Mandarin
- Hanyu Pinyin: Yáng Chénglín
Yue: Cantonese
- Jyutping: Joeng4 Sing4 Lam4

Rainie Yang Cheng Lin (Chinese: 楊丞琳; born 4 June 1984) is a Taiwanese singer, actress, and television host. Yang began her career in 2000 as a member of girl group 4 in Love. After the group disbanded in 2002, she began a successful solo career with her album, My Intuition, in 2005. In addition to singing, she is known for co-hosting the variety show Guess from 2002 to 2007, and for her acting roles in TV dramas Meteor Garden (2001), Devil Beside You (2005), Why Why Love (2007), and Hi My Sweetheart (2009), for which she received the Golden Bell Award for Best Actress.

== Early life ==
Yang was born and raised in Taipei, Taiwan, her father's ancestors were from Guangdong, China. She spoke Cantonese at home. By the time Yang turned thirteen, she had to start working because her father's business failed, which led to her parents being divorced. She attended Hwa Kang Arts School which specialized in performance arts.

== Career ==
=== 2000–2005: Career beginnings ===
Yang began her career in 2000 as a member of Taiwanese girl group 4 in Love, where she was given the stage name Rainie. The group's popularity in the musical industry achieved limited success. After they disbanded in 2002, Yang continued to pursue her career in the entertainment industry as a TV host, hosting shows such as the variety show Guess from late 2002 to early 2007. After playing supporting roles in a series of Taiwanese TV dramas, including the highly popular pan-Asia hit Taiwanese series Meteor Garden and its supplementary mini-series Meteor Rain, she landed the leading role as Qi Yue, in the Taiwanese drama Devil Beside You with Mike He in 2005. In the same year, she released her debut album, My Intuition, featured the hit song "Intuition" as the theme song of Devil Beside You and "Ideal Lover". The album was commercially successful and sold over 160,000 copies in Taiwan and over 1 million copies throughout Asia. It was certified platinum by the Recording Industry Foundation in Taiwan (RIT).

=== 2006–2008: Career advancements and acting projects ===
In 2006, she released her second album, Meeting Love, which sold over 150,000 copies in Taiwan and 1,200,000 copies across Asia. On 8 January 2007, Yang recorded her last Guess episode due to her busy schedule and focus on her musical and acting career. Hoping to portray herself as a "serious" actress, Yang co-starred in the lesbian-themed film Spider Lilies with Isabella Leong. However, after co-starring in Spider Lilies, Yang returned to her previous cute image by becoming the leading role in the drama Why Why Love, with Mike He and Kingone Wang, which aired during the summer of 2007. She subsequently released her third album, My Other Self on 7 September 2007. It features the theme song from Why Why Love, "Lacking Oxygen" and the insert song "Perfect Example".

On 23 April 2008, while filming the Taiwanese drama Miss No Good in San Chih, Taiwan, Yang fell heavily from the stairs, and was sent to Mackay Memorial Hospital in Taipei. The stairs were located between the third floor, where the dressing room was located, and the first floor, where the film set was located. The crew originally thought the falling object was a light frame, but upon hearing a groan, they realized it was her. After an X-ray examination, doctors diagnosed Yang's injury as a spinal contusion. After leaving the hospital, producer Angie Chai took Yang to a Chinese massage therapist. Miss No Good, starring Yang and Will Pan, was aired during the fall and winter of 2008 and met with much success. During this period of time, she also released her 4th album, Not Yet a Woman, which features the insert song "Too Much Trouble" and the theme song "Take Me Away" that were featured Miss No Good.

=== 2009–2013: Albums and touring ===
In 2009, Yang starred in To Get Her with Jiro Wang of Fahrenheit and George Hu. Then she filmed The Child's Eye in Thailand, a horror flick directed by the Pang Brothers with Elanne Kong, and also Taiwanese drama Hi My Sweetheart with Show Lo. After promoting Hi My Sweetheart, Yang released her fifth album, Rainie & Love...?, on the New Year's Day of 2010. Due to the success of Devil Beside You and Miss No Good overseas, Yang entered J-pop industry in 2010 by releasing a Japanese version of her hit "Intuition" as her first Japanese-language single.

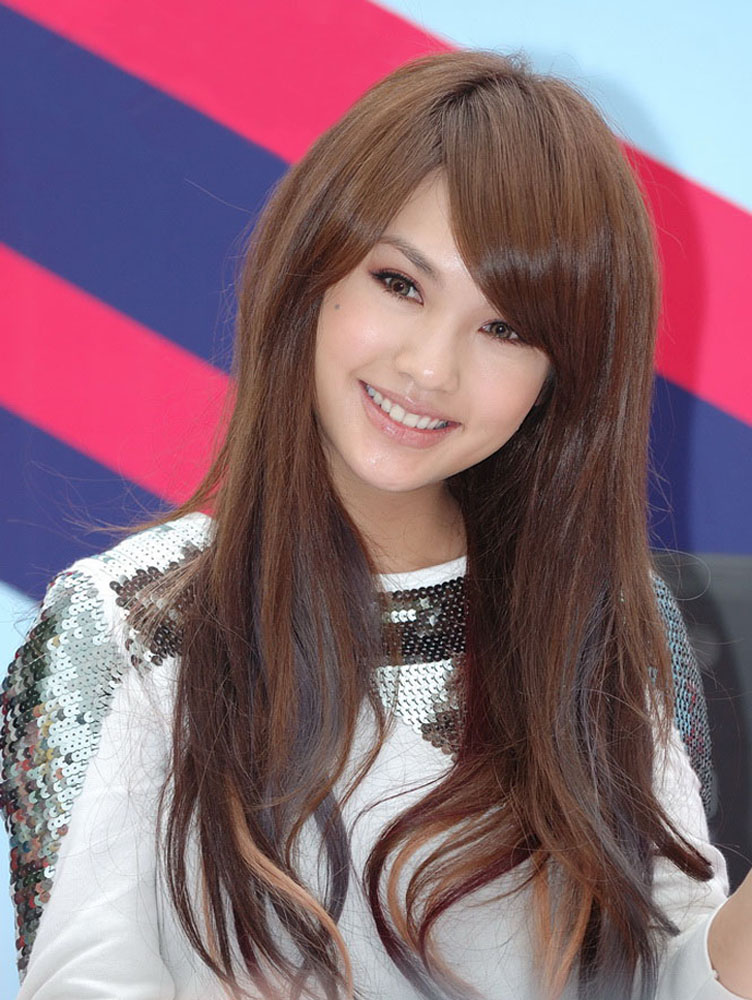
Yang in 2010

Yang released her first compilation album, Whimsical World Collection, on 23 April 2010. It consists of 3 new tracks, 35 previously released tracks and 15 music videos from her previous five studio albums. On 22 October 2010, she won Best Actress at the 45th Golden Bell Awards, for her role as Chen Baozhu in Hi My Sweetheart.

In 2011, Yang released her sixth studio album Longing for..., which features the song "We Are All Silly", an interlude of Love You. In 2012, Yang starred in the romantic short film, Heartbeat Love, with Show Lo. On 17 August 2012, she released her seventh studio album Wishing for Happiness. Her second concert tour, Love Voyage, embarked on 14 December. On 23 August 2013, Yang released her eighth studio album Angel Wings.

=== 2014–2019: Traces of Time in Love and Delete Reset Grow ===
In 2014, Yang signed to EMI Taiwan, a revived label that is now a subsidiary of Universal Music Taiwan. Her ninth studio album, A Tale of Two Rainie, was released on 12 December 2014. In the same year, she starred in the Chinese drama series Love at Second Sight.

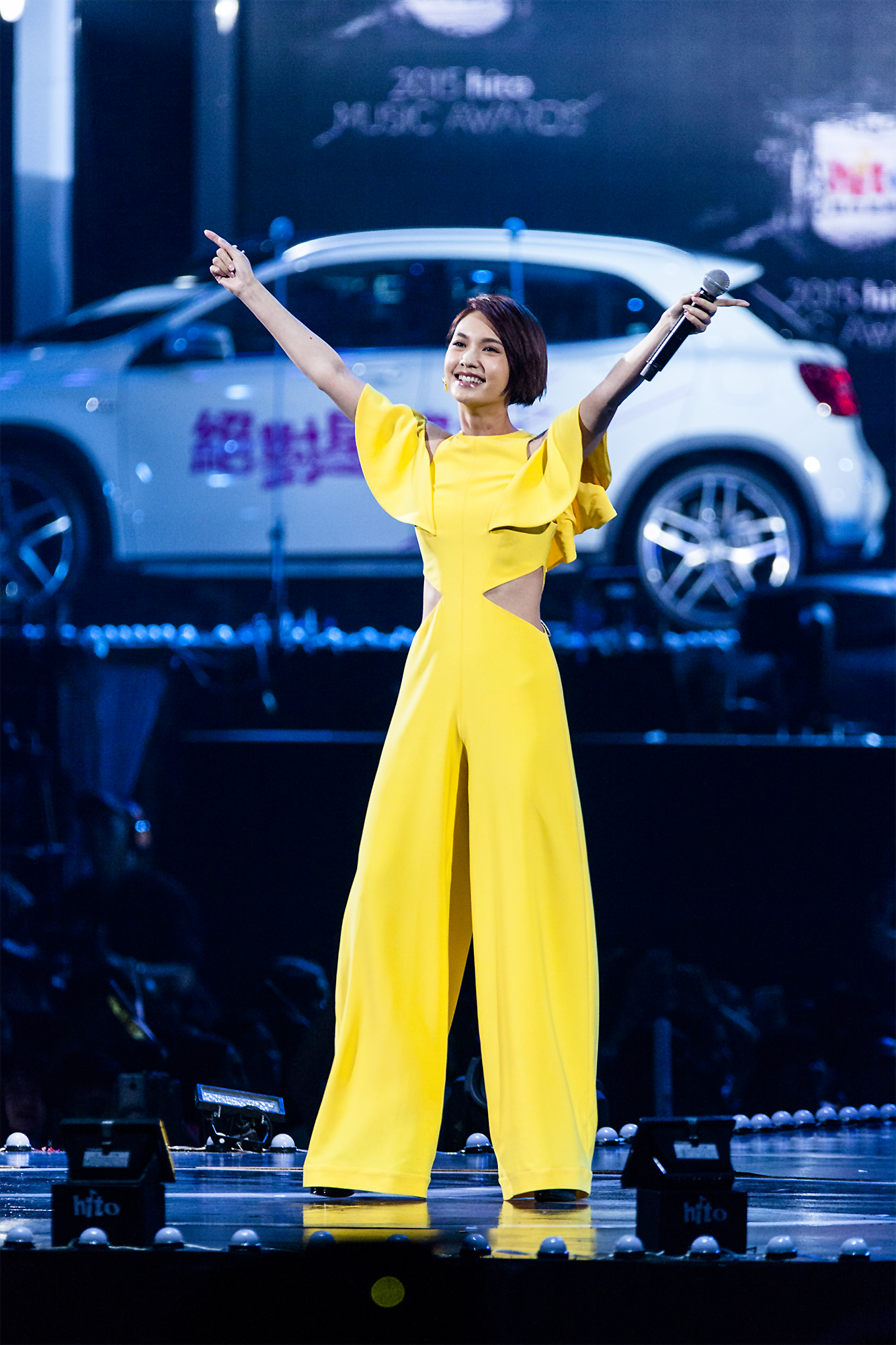
Yang in 2015

On 30 September 2016, her tenth studio album Traces of Time in Love was released. It was nominated for three awards at the 28th Golden Melody Awards, including Song of the Year, Best Lyricist, and Best Single Producer for the title track "Traces of Time in Love". Yang thus joined the list of having been nominated for all three prestigious entertainment awards in Taiwan, namely the Golden Bell Awards (television), the Golden Horse Awards (film) and the Golden Melody Awards (music). In the same year, Yang starred in the Taiwanese television series Life Plan A and B.

On 9 October 2016, Rainie Yang attended the new album autograph session and has voiced that she supports the LGBTQIA+ community and legalization of homosexual marriage equal rights when the Lee Tien-chu has sponsored his anti-gay expression. Yang was annoyed and said that homosexuality is not a crime and love is inherently gender neutral. She also said that she would like to continue play LGBTQIA+ acting roles in the future, and that it is an honor to have the opportunity for interpretation. On 27 November 2019, Yang released her eleventh studio album Delete Reset Grow.

=== 2020–present: Like a Star and concert tour ===
On 5 November 2020, Yang released her twelfth studio album Like a Star. The following day, Yang embarked on her Like a Star World Tour. In 2024, she participated in the Chinese reality show Singer.

In October 2025, she launched Only in Echoes to mark her 25th year in show business.

== Personal life ==
Yang dated Alien Huang, godson of Yang's mother, for two years while they were both students at Taipei Hwa Kang Arts School. Their relationship ended after Yang entered the entertainment industry and dropped out of the school. From around 2001 to 2003, Yang dated Ben Pai, member of B. A. D., until she began a relationship with her Original Scent of Summer co-star Roy Chiu in 2003. She later described Chiu as moody and difficult, stating that he was the worst of all her boyfriends: "It was an unblessed relationship; no one around me wanted us to be together. During the eight months we dated, I saw him fewer than ten times." They broke up after Yang sent a text message, to which Chiu responded half a month later, agreeing to the breakup. The two had no contact for 15 years after, until they reconciled in 2018 when she congratulated Chiu backstage at the 20th Taipei Film Awards for winning the Best Actor Award.

In 2004, she had a half-year relationship with actor Yi Lee. From 2005 to 2006, Yang dated Junhao Yuan after they co-starred in the idol drama Devil Beside You. They ended their relationship because she felt too young to consider marriage, which had been proposed by his family. In 2011, Yang was spotted boarding the same flight from Taipei to the United States with Sunny Wang, and Wang was also seen entering Yang's home. The two-month relationship ended as soon as it became public. From 2012 to 2014, Yang dated Prince Chiu.

In December 2014, Yang began dating Chinese singer-songwriter Li Ronghao, who wrote the song "幸福果子" for Yang in 2007 On 11 July 2019, Li announced that Yang accepted his wedding proposal on his 34th birthday. On 17 September 2019, Yang and Li confirmed they have obtained their marriage certificate in China.

== Discography ==
Studio albums

- My Intuition (2005)
- Meeting Love (2006)
- My Other Self (2007)
- Not Yet a Woman (2008)
- Rainie & Love...? (2010)
- Longing For (2011)
- Wishing for Happiness (2012)
- Angel Wings (2013)
- A Tale of Two Rainie (2014)
- Traces of Time in Love (2016)
- Delete Reset Grow (2019)
- Like a Star (2020)
- Only in Echoes (2025)

== Tours ==
Whimsical World Tour
Date	City	Country	Venue	Special guest(s)
24 April 2010	Taipei	Taiwan	Taipei Arena	Jerry Yan
16 October 2010	Singapore		Singapore Indoor Stadium	—N/a

Love Voyage World Tour
Date	City	Country	Venue	Special guest(s)
14 December 2012	Hong Kong		Hong Kong Coliseum	—N/a
15 December 2012	Hong Kong		Hong Kong Coliseum	Show Lo
16 December 2012	Hong Kong		Hong Kong Coliseum	Coco Lee
12 January 2013	Singapore		The Max Pavilion	—N/a
23 March 2013	Taipei	Taiwan	Taipei Arena	Wu Tsing-fong
29 June 2013	Genting Highlands	Malaysia	Arena of Stars	Jiro Wang
20 July 2013	Shanghai	China	Shanghai Gymnasium	—N/a
19 October 2013	Macau	China	Cotai Arena	—N/a
21 September 2014	Atlantic City	United States	Circus Maximus Theater	—N/a

Youth Lies Within World Tour
Date	City	Country	Venue	Special guest(s)
16 December 2017	Taipei	Taiwan	Taipei Arena	Yoga Lin
17 December 2017	Taipei	Taiwan	Taipei Arena	Jacky Wu
24 February 2018	Hong Kong		Hong Kong Coliseum	Jason Chan
25 February 2018	Hong Kong		Hong Kong Coliseum	4 in Love
20 May 2018	Guangzhou	China	Guangzhou International Sports Arena	Will Pan
4 August 2018	Chengdu	China	Sichuan Gymnasium	—N/a
25 August 2018	Beijing	China	Cadillac Arena	Cyndi Wang
6 October 2018	Kaohsiung	Taiwan	Kaohsiung Arena	Alien Huang
13 October 2018	Wuhan	China	Optics Valley International Tennis Center	—N/a
27 October 2018	Hangzhou	China	Yellow Dragon Sports Center	—N/a
4 May 2019	Macau	China	Cotai Arena	Christine Fan
22 June 2019	Nanning	China	Guangxi Sports Center	Michelle Chen
20 July 2019	Foshan	China	Greater Bay Area Center	—N/a
2 November 2019	Kuala Lumpur	Malaysia	Axiata Arena	—N/a
9 November 2019	Singapore		The Star Performing Arts Centre	—N/a
7 December 2019	Suzhou	China	Suzhou Olympic Sports Centre	—N/a
28 December 2019	Nanjing	China	Nanjing Olympic Sports Center Gymnasium	—N/a

Like a Star World Tour
Date	City	Country	Venue	Special guest(s)
6 November 2020	Taipei	Taiwan	Taipei Arena	Wu Tsing-fong
7 November 2020	Taipei	Taiwan	Taipei Arena	Cyndi Wang
8 November 2020	Taipei	Taiwan	Taipei Arena	Li Ronghao
17 June 2023	Taipei	Taiwan	Taipei Arena	
18 June 2023	Taipei	Taiwan	Taipei Arena	
26 August 2023	Guangzhou	China	Guangzhou Gymnasium	
2 September 2023	Jinan	China	Jinan Olympic Sports Center Gymnasium	
9 September 2023	Suzhou	China	Suzhou Olympic Sports Center Gymnasium	
24 September 2023	Chengdu	China	Chengdu Phoenix Hill Gymnasium	
21 October 2023	Wuhan	China	Wuhan Sports Center Gymnasium	
28 October 2023	Zhanjiang	China	Zhanjiang Sports Centre Gymnasium	
18 November 2023	Wuxi	China	Wuxi Sports Center Gymnasium	
25 November 2023	Chongqing	China	Huaxi Cultural and Sports Center	
2 December 2023	Shenzhen	China	Shenzhen Bay Sports Center Gymnasium	
9 December 2023	Zhengzhou	China	Zhengzhou Olympic Sports Center Gymnasium	
23 December 2023	Beijing	China	National Indoor Stadium	
30 December 2023	Fuzhou	China	Haixia Olympic Center	
6 January 2024	Shanghai	China	Mercedes-Benz Arena	
13 January 2024	Macau	China	Galaxy Arena	
27 January 2024	Shaoxing	China	Shaoxing Olympic Sports Centre Gymnasium	
23 March 2024	Foshan	China	GBA International Sports Center	
13 April 2024	Quanzhou	China	Jinjiang Second Sports Center	
20 April 2024	Ningbo	China	Ningbo Olympic Sports Center Gymnasium	
3 May 2024	Qingdao	China	Qingdao Citizen Fitness Center Gymnasium	
19 May 2024	Tianjin	China	Tianjin Olympic Center Gymnasium	
1 June 2024	Hefei	China	Hefei Shaoquan Sports Center	
8 June 2024	Dongguan	China	Bank of Dongguan Basketball Center	
13 July 2024	Taiyuan	China	Shanxi International Exhibition Center	
27 July 2024	Kuala Lumpur	Malaysia	Axiata Arena	

The Elephant We see World Tour
Date	City	Country	Venue	Special guest(s)
31 December 2025	Nanchang	China	Nanchang International Sport Center	
28 March 2026	Chengdu	China	Chengdu Phoenix Hill Gymnasium	
11 April 2026(cancelled)	Singapore		The Star Theatre	

== Filmography ==
=== Television series ===
Year	English title	Original title	Role	Notes
2001	Meteor Garden	流星花園	Xiao You	
2001	Meteor Rain	流星雨	Xiao You	Xi Men's chapter
2001	Sunshine Jelly	陽光果凍	Mei	
2002	Tomorrow	愛情白皮書	Yuan Chen-mei	
2003	Lavender 2	花香番外篇	Xiao-xiao	
2003	The Pink Godfather	粉紅教父小甜甜	Bao Xiao-ting / Chen Tian-shi	
2003	The Original Scent of Summer	原味的夏天	Yang Pan-pan	
2004	Love Bird	候鳥e人	Jiang Ding-han	
2004	Legend of Speed	極速傳說	Juliet / Gao Yun	
2004	City of the Sky	天空之城	Lu Bin-yan	
2005	Strange Tales of Liao Zhai	聊齋系列之阿寶篇	Zheng Ah-bao	
2005	Devil Beside You	惡魔在身邊	Qi Yue	
2007	Why Why Love	換換愛	Tong Jia-di	
2008	Miss No Good	不良笑花	Jiang Xiao-hua	
2009	ToGetHer	愛就宅一起	Chen Mo-mo	
2009	Hi My Sweetheart	海派甜心	Chen Bao-zhu	
2011	Drunken To Love You	醉後決定愛上你	Lin Xiao-ru	
2011	Sunny Girl	陽光天使	Chen Yang-guang	
2014	Love at Second Sight	一見不鍾情	Fei Luo-luo	
2016	Rock Records in Love	滾石愛情故事	Chen Li-xin	Episode: "Love"
2016	Life Plan A and B	植劇場-荼靡	Cheng Ru-wei	
2018	My Ex-Man	前男友不是人	Li Chin-ai	

=== Film ===
Year	English title	Original title	Role	Notes
2001	Merry Go Round	初戀嗱喳麵	Carlily Pang	
2006	Over the Hedge	—N/a	Heather	Mandarin dub
2007	Spider Lilies	刺青	Xiao Lü / Jade	
2010	The Child's Eye	童眼	Rainie	
2012	HeartBeat Love	再一次心跳	Yang Xiao-yu	Short film
2012	Wishing for Happiness	想幸福的人	Chen You-lan (Xiao Lan)	Short film
2014	Endless Nights in Aurora	極光之愛	Alisha	
2017	The Tag-Along 2	紅衣小女孩2	Li Shu-fen	
2018	The Tag-Along: The Devil Fish	人面魚：紅衣小女孩外傳	Li Shu-fen	Cameo (2nd post-credits scene)
2019	Three Makes A Whole	握三下，我愛你	Liu Li-li	Television film
2021	I Missed You	我沒有談的那場戀愛	Nan's ex-girlfriend	Voice cameo
TBA	Ling Yu	靈語		

=== Variety show ===
Year	English title	Original title	Notes
2002–2007	Guess	我猜我猜我猜猜猜	Host
2002–2004	Entertainment News	娛樂心新聞	Host
2003	Game Show	遊戲王朝	Host
2009	One Million Star 4	超級星光大道-第四季	Guest host; 23 & 30 January episodes
2016	Mask Singer	蒙面唱將猜猜猜	Appearance
2018	Shake It Up	新舞林大會	Reality show
2018	Jungle Voice	聲林之王	Guest mentor
2019	Heart Signal 2	心動的信號-第二季	Appearance
2020	DD52 Dancing Diamond 52	菱格世代	Mentor
2021	Sisters Who Make Waves 2	乘風破浪的姐姐 (第二季)	Participant

=== Music video appearances ===
Year	Artist	Song title
2004	Show Lo	"Clown Fish"
2012	Show Lo	"You Are the World's Best Looking Girl"
2017	Vision Wei	"Unchanged"

== Awards and nominations ==
Year	Award	Category	Nominated work	Result	Ref.
2005	Metro Radio Hits Music Award	Best New Artist		Won	
2005	IFPI Hong Kong Album Sales Awards	Top 10 Selling Mandarin Albums of the Year	My Intuition	Won	
2006	Metro Radio Mandarin Hits Music Awards	Best Mandarin Singer		Won	
2006	IFPI Hong Kong Album Sales Awards	Top 10 Selling Mandarin Albums of the Year	Meeting Love	Won	
2006	Global Chinese Music Chart Awards	Best Female New Artist		Won	
2007	Hito Radio Music Awards	Top 10 Songs of the Year (Note: The order is not specified for the Top 10 Songs of the Year)	"Meeting Love"	Won	
2007	Hong Kong TVB8 Awards	Top 10 Gold Songs	"Lacking Oxygen"	Nominated	
2007	Metro Radio Hits Music Awards	Best Mandarin Singer		Won	
2007	Metro Radio Hits Music Awards	Singer-Dancer Grand Prize		Won	
2007	Yahoo! Search Awards	Favourite International Female Artist		Won	
2007	Yahoo! Search Awards	Favourite International Female Actress		Won	
2007	44th Golden Horse Awards	Best Original Film Song	"Little Jasmine" (from Spider Lilies)	Nominated	
2008	Golden Bell Awards	Best Actress	Why Why Love	Nominated	
2008	Yahoo! Search Awards	Favourite International Female Artist		Won	
2008		Favourite International Female Actress		Won	
2009	Singapore Hit Awards	Favourite Female Artist		Nominated	
2010	Golden Bell Awards	Best Actress	Hi My Sweetheart	Won	
2010	Singapore Hit Awards	Most Popular Female Artiste		Won	
2010	Taiwan Next Magazine Entertainment Awards	Top 10 Artist of the Year		Won	
2010	Channel V's Music Chart Awards	Favourite Female Artist		Won	
2010	US Complex Magazine	The Sexiest Taiwanese Female Celebrity (popular vote)		Won	
2011	Taiwan Next Magazine Entertainment Awards	Top 10 Artist of the Year		Won	
2011	Asia Rainbow TV Awards	Best Actress (Comedy)	Hi My Sweetheart	Nominated	
2012	Singapore Entertainment Awards	Most Popular Female Singer		Won	
2012	Metro Radio Mandarin Hits Music Awards	Songs of the Year	"We Are All Silly"	Won	
2012	Metro Radio Mandarin Hits Music Awards	Best Asia Singer		Won	
2012	Metro Radio Mandarin Hits Music Awards	Most Popular Idol		Won	
2012	Metro Radio Mandarin Hits Music Awards	Most Popular Partner Award	with Show Lo	Won	
2012	Next Magazine Entertainment Awards	Top 10 Artist of the Year		Won	
2013	Yahoo! Taiwan	Most Popular Female Artist		Won	
2013	Music Radio China Top Chart Awards	Golden Melodies of the Year	"Forgotten"	Won	
2013	Music Radio China Top Chart Awards	Favourite Campus Female Singer of the Year		Won	
2013	Music Radio China Top Chart Awards	Recommended Singer of the Year (Hong Kong/Taiwan)		Won	
2013	17th Global Mandarin Chart Music Award	Best Crossover Female Singer		Won	
2013	17th Global Mandarin Chart Music Award	Best Music Video (Hong Kong/Taiwan)	"Forgotten"	Won	
2013	Hito Radio Music Awards	Breakthrough Act of the Year		Won	
2013	Hito Radio Music Awards	Most Popular Female Singer		Won	
2013	Hito Radio Music Awards	Top 10 Mandarin Songs of The Year	"Forgotten"	Won	
2013	Global Chinese Golden Chart Awards	Top 20 Golden Melodies of the Year	"Forgotten"	Won	
2013	CSC Music Awards	Best Female Singer of The Year		Won	
2013	CSC Music Awards	Top 20 Songs of the Year	"Forgotten"	Won	
2013	Singapore Hit Awards	Top 10 Songs	"Forgotten"	Won	
2013	Singapore Hit Awards	Most Popular Female Artist		Nominated	
2013	MTV Europe Music Awards	Best Taiwanese Act		Nominated	
2014	Hito Radio Music Awards	Most Popular Female Singer		Won	
2014	Hito Radio Music Awards	Hit Fm Favourite Artist		Won	
2014	Hito Radio Music Awards	Top 10 Mandarin Songs of The Year	"Angel Wings"	Won	
2015	Hito Radio Music Awards	Best Duet	"Snore" (feat. Will Pan)	Won	
2015	Hito Radio Music Awards	Top 10 Mandarin Songs of The Year	"Snore" (feat. Will Pan)	Won	
2015	Chinese Young Generation Film Forum	Best Actress (Jury Award)	Endless Nights in Aurora	Won	
2017	Golden Bell Awards	Best Leading Actress in a Television Series	Life Plan A and B	Nominated	
2017	28th Golden Melody Awards	Song of the Year	"Traces of Time in Love"	Nominated	
2018	Asia Pacific Film Festival Awards	Best Actress	The Tag-Along 2	Nominated	
2020	Hito Radio Music Awards	Top 10 Mandarin Songs of The Year	"Delete, Reset"	Won	
2020	Hito Radio Music Awards	Hito Star All-round Artist	Delete Reset Grow	Won	
