= Show Lo discography =

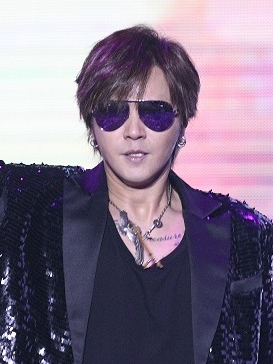
- Lo in 2022
- Studio albums: 12
- Compilation albums: 3
- Video albums: 3
- Remix albums: 1
- Group albums: 7
- Other songs: 2
- Soundtrack songs: 13

The discography of Taiwanese recording artist Show Lo consists of eleven Mandarin studio albums, one Japanese studio album, three compilation, one remix and three concert DVD albums. From 1996 to 1998, he was part of a quartet boy band Four Heavenly Kings (四大天王), releasing five albums. Then in 1998, after two members left, he formed a duo Romeo (羅密歐), with Eddy Ou; the other member of Four Heavenly Kings, released two albums and was active till 2000. In 2003, he debuted as a solo artist with the release of Show Time.

In December 2010, Luo's seventh studio album Rashomon was certified by the Recording Industry Foundation in Taiwan (RIT) for sales of 154,218 copies in Taiwan, thus a certification of 5× Platinum and the best-selling album in Taiwan of 2010. Only for You (2011), 9ood Show (2012), and Lion Roar (2013) were further named the best-selling albums of each year in Taiwan, with each album selling over 120,000 copies.

== Albums ==
=== Studio albums ===
Title	Album details	Peak chart positions		Sales	Certifications
Title	Album details	TWN	JPN	Sales	Certifications
Show Time	Released: December 5, 2003; Label: Avex Taiwan; Formats: CD, digital download	—	—		
Expert Show (達人Show)	Released: October 22, 2004; Label: Avex Taiwan; Formats: CD, digital download	—	—		
Hypnosis Show (催眠Show)	Released: October 14, 2005; Label: Avex Taiwan; Formats: CD, digital download	1	—		
Speshow	Released: November 17, 2006; Label: Avex Taiwan; Formats: CD, digital download	1	—		
Show Your Dance (舞所不在)	Released: November 16, 2007; Label: EMI Music Taiwan; Formats: CD, digital download	1	—		
Trendy Man (潮男正傳)	Released: December 26, 2008; Label: Gold Typhoon; Formats: CD, digital download	1	—		
Rashomon (羅生門)	Released: January 15, 2010; Label: Gold Typhoon; Formats: CD, digital download	1	—	TWN: 154,218	RIT: 5× Platinum
Only for You (獨一無二)	Released: February 18, 2011; Label: Gold Typhoon; Formats: CD, digital download	3	34	TWN: 150,000	
9ood Show (有我在)	Released: April 6, 2012; Label: Gold Typhoon; Formats: CD, digital download	1	58	TWN: 150,000	
The Show	Released: September 19, 2012 (JPN); Label: Pony Canyon; Formats: CD, digital download	—	36		
Lion Roar (狮子吼)	Released: November 8, 2013; Label: Sony Music Taiwan; Formats: CD, digital download	1	—	TWN: 120,000	
Reality Show? (真人秀?)	Released: November 20, 2015; Label: EMI Music Taiwan; Formats: CD, digital download	—	43		
No Idea	Released: April 23, 2019; Label: EMI Music Taiwan; Formats: CD, digital download	—	—		

=== Compilation albums ===
Title	Album details	Peak chart positions
Title	Album details	TWN
Best Show	Released: November 2, 2007; Label: Avex Taiwan; Formats: CD+DVD, digital download	14
All for You	Released: January 21, 2011; Label: Avex Taiwan; Formats: 3CD+2DVD, digital download	—
Over the Limit (舞極限)	Released: November 23, 2012; Label: Good Typhoon; Formats: 2CD, digital download	1

=== Remix albums ===
Title	Album details
Dance is King Remix Collection (舞者為王 混音極選)	Released: May 15, 2010; Label: Good Typhoon; Formats: CD+DVD/USB, digital download

== Singles ==
=== Japanese singles ===
Title	Year	Peak chart positions	Album
Title	Year	JPN	Album
"Dante" (但丁)	2012	10	The Show
"Magic"	2012	14	The Show
"Fantasy"	2014	15	Non-album single

== Concert DVD ==
Title	Album details
Show On Cruel Stage Concert Live (殘酷舞台真實錄Live)	Released: July 11, 2008; Label: EMI Music Taiwan
Born To Dance Live Tour DVD (生命之舞 Live Tour DVD)	Released: November 11, 2011; Label: Gold Typhoon
極限拼圖 Live Tour DVD	Released: August 1, 2014; Label: Universal Music Taiwan

== Other concert DVD ==
Title	Album details
Hypnosis Show (Commemorate Edition) (催眠Show『慶功加場版』)	Released: January 26, 2006; Label: Avex Taiwan
Speshow (Live Golden Edition)	Released: February 16, 2007; Label: Avex Taiwan
Show Your Dance (Collectible Edition) (舞所不在 『衛冕慶功黃金典藏版』)	Released: January 25, 2008; Label: EMI Music Taiwan

== Soundtrack contributions ==
- 2000 The Youth Of Liang Shanbo & Zhu Yintai OST (新梁山伯與祝英台 aka 少年梁祝) – "錦繡陽關道"
- 2000 The Youth Of Liang Shanbo & Zhu Yintai OST (新梁山伯與祝英台 aka 少年梁祝) – "拜訪我的愛"
- 2003 Show Time – "妳說妳的我說我的" (You Said It's Yours I Say It's Mine) – Hi Working Girl (Hi！上班女郎) ending theme
- 2004 Expert Show – "灰色空間" (Grey Dimension) – Outsiders II (鬥魚2) ending theme
- 2006 Speshow – "愛＊轉角" (Love＊Corner) – Corner With Love ending theme
- 2006 Speshow – "幾分" (How Many Points) – Corner With Love insert song
- 2007 High School Musical 2 Special Edition (歌舞青春 2 亞洲豪華超值版) – "Bet On It" ("必殺技") – Mandarin version
- 2008 Trendy Man – "箇中強手" (Best Of The Bunch) – Hot Shot opening theme
- 2008 Trendy Man – "幸福不滅" (Cause I Believe) – Hot Shot insert song
- 2010 Rashomon – "生理時鐘" (Biological Clock) – Hi My Sweetheart insert song
- 2010 Rashomon – "愛瘋頭" (Head Over Heels) – Hi My Sweetheart opening theme
- 2010 Rashomon – "愛不單行" (You Won't Be Alone) – Hi My Sweetheart insert song
- 2010 Rashomon – "In Your Eyes" – feat Rainie Yang – Hi My Sweetheart insert song

== Collaboration ==
=== Song and music video ===
- Expert Show – "戀愛達人" (Love Expert) – feat Dee Shu
- Expert Show – "一起走吧" (Let's Go) – feat Energy
- Hypnosis Show – "真命天子" (Destined Guy) – feat. Jolin Tsai
- 2006 – Jump Up – 9492 (Joey Yung) – "飆汗" (Sweating) – feat Show Lo
- Speshow – "Twinkle" – feat Kumi Koda (倖田來未)
- Speshow – "國王遊戲" (King's Game) – feat Simon Webbe (song only)
- Show Your Dance – "敗給你" (Lost To You) – feat Elva Hsiao
- Rashomon – "Wow!" – feat Elva Hsiao
- Rashomon – "In Your Eyes" – feat Rainie Yang, which also used in her album Rainie & Love...?

=== Music video ===
- 2001 天天說愛我 (Makiyo 川島茉樹代) – "越來越遠" – feat Show Lo & Blackie
- Show Time – "沒有妳" (Without You) – feat Terri Kwan (關穎) & Jerry Huang (黃志瑋) from Show Lo Music Love Story
- Show Time – "這一秒我哭了" (In This Second I Cried) – feat Terri Kwan Jerry Huang from Show Lo Music Love Story
- Expert Show – "小丑魚" (Clown Fish) – feat Rainie Yang
- 2004 – Tiao Xin (Shin) – "挑釁" – feat Show Lo – he plays a photographer who goes blind
- Hypnosis Show – "自我催眠" (Self-Hypnosis) – feat Barbie Shu
- Hypnosis Show – "嗆司嗆司" (Chance Chance) – feat Maggie Wu and cameo by Luo MaMa (Show's mother)
- 2005 Luminary (He Jie) – "希望" (Hope) – feat Show Lo
- Speshow – "好朋友" (Good Friends) – feat Ariel Lin
- Show Your Dance – "我不會唱歌" (I Don't Know How To Sing) – feat Karena Lam
- Trendy Man – "撐腰" (Waist Support) – guest appearance by Party Boys, Da S, Xiao S, Jolin Tsai, Blackie/Hei Ren, Da Mu, Gua Ge, Xian Ge, Chai Zhi Ping, Lin He Long and Luo MaMa
- Trendy Man – "搞笑" (Making Jokes) – feat Alice Tzeng
- Only for You – "Touch My Heart" – feat Ivy Chen
- 2011 – Sticky (Cyndi Wang) – "陪我到以後" – feat Show Lo

== Other songs ==
- 2008 – "用愛點亮希望" – 音樂之聲 (Love and Hope) – Sound of Music I Want To Go To School (我要上學) campaign theme song
- 2010 – "小事變樂事" (Small Pleasures) – Lays Max potato chips advert theme song (樂事MAX波樂洋芋片)
