= Lord of the Dance (album) =

2010 remix album by Show Lo

- Lord of the Dance (CD+DVD) cover

Remix album 舞者為王混音極選 by Show Lo
- Released: 15 May 2010
- Genre: Mandopop
- Length: 36:59
- Language: Mandarin
- Label: Gold Typhoon (Taiwan)

Show Lo chronology
Rashomon (2010)	Lord of the Dance (2010)	All for You (2011)

Alternative cover

Lord of the Dance: The Utmost Remix Selection (Chinese: 舞者為王混音極選) is the first Mandarin remix album by the Taiwanese Mandopop artist Show Lo. It was released on 15 May 2010 by Gold Typhoon (Taiwan) with a bonus DVD containing a 40-minute Show Lo New York documentary. It has eight remix tracks selected from Show's first three studio albums released by Gold Typhoon, from Show Your Dance in 2007 to Rashomon in 2010, as well as the advertisement theme song for Lays Max potato chips, "小事變樂事" (Small Pleasures), which is another remix version of "撐腰" (Waist Support).

A second edition was released on 22 June 2010 in a 2GB USB flashdrive (2GB) format containing the Show Lo New York documentary, photobook and other gifts.

== Track listing ==
1. "愛的主場秀" Ai De Zhu Chang Xiu (The Leading Role) - Show Trance Remix
2. "箇中強手" Ge Zhong Qiang Shou (Best of the Bunch - HOT SHOT) - Violent Electro Remix
3. "一支獨秀" Yi Zhi Du Xiu (One Man Show) - Funky Breakbeat Remix
4. "撐腰" Cheng Yao (Waist Support) -Back Up Trance Remix
5. "當我們宅一塊" Dang Wo Men Zhai Yi Kuai (When We Are Together) - Nu Jazz Downtempo Remix
6. "搞定" Gao Ding (Got You Nailed) - Funky House Remix
7. "羅生門" Luo Sheng Men (Lovers Puzzle) - Euro Techno Remix
8. "小事變樂事" (Small Pleasures) - "撐腰" (Waist Support remix) - Lays Max potato chips advert song

== Bonus DVD/USB ==
DVD - Lord of the Dance (CD+DVD)

- Show Lo New York documentary (羅志祥 舞王紐約私密生活記錄DVD) - 40 minutes of footage shot during Show's brief time in New York City, where he studied dancing, fooled around, and filmed the music video for "愛的主場秀" (The Leading Role) at the United Palace Theater.

USB - Lord of the Dance (Limited USB edition)

- Show Lo New York documentary
- Dance Without Limits 3D World Live Tour Hong Kong Concert Photobook (舞法舞天演唱會 舞王究極香港演唱會寫真)
- Show Lo screensaver
- "生理時鐘" (Biological Clock) widget
