= Remix (disambiguation) =

A remix is an alternative version of a recorded work.

Remix or The Remix may also refer to:

== Film and television ==
- Remix (film), a 2008 Danish film
- The Remix: Hip Hop X Fashion, a 2019 American documentary film
- Remix (TV series), a 2004–2006 Indian teen drama series
- Remix (Arabic TV series), a musical series featuring Hamza Namira
- The Remix (TV series), a 2018 Indian music reality competition series
- "Remix" (Good Girls), a television episode

== Literature and periodicals ==
- Remix (book), a 2008 book by Lawrence Lessig
- Remix (magazine), a defunct American music magazine
- Remix (fashion magazine), a New Zealand magazine
- reMix, a 1999 novel by Jon Courtenay Grimwood
- Remix, a Malaysian entertainment magazine

== Music ==
- Remix (Candan Erçetin album), 2003
- Remix (Le Tigre album), 2003
- Remix (Mushroomhead album), 1997
- Remix (William Control album), 2014
- r.e.m.IX, an album by R.E.M., 2002
- Remix, an EP by Sam Smith, 2020
- The Remix (Lady Gaga album), 2010
- The Remix (Ariana Grande album), 2015
- "Remix (I Like The)", a song by New Kids on the Block, 2013
- "Remix", a song by Daddy Yankee from the album Legendaddy, 2022

== Technology ==
- re-mix, an open-source library to bring mixin to C# and Visual Basic.NET
- Remix 3D, a Microsoft website for browsing, distributing, and downloading 3D objects
- Remix Fuel, an alternative nuclear fuel developed in Russia
- Remix OS, an Android-based computer operating system for x86 architecture
- Remix, an integrated development environment for Solidity
- Remix, the former name of React Router, a JavaScript web framework

== See also ==
- Arrangement, a musical reconceptualization of a previously composed work
- Category:Remix albums
- OverClocked ReMix, a website which hosts video game musical arrangements
- Remixes (disambiguation)
- The Remix Album (disambiguation)
- The Remix Collection (disambiguation)
- The Remixes (disambiguation)
