= Before the Dawn =

Before the Dawn may refer to:

== Music ==
- Before the Dawn (band), a melodic death/gothic metal band from Finland
- Before the Dawn (Buju Banton album), 2010
- Before the Dawn (residency), a set of concerts performed by British singer Kate Bush in 2014
  - Before the Dawn (Kate Bush album), 2016 album consisting of live recordings from the concerts
- Before the Dawn (Patrice Rushen album), 1975
- Before the Dawn (Shin album), 2011
- "Before the Dawn", a song by Judas Priest from the 1978 album Killing Machine
- "BTD (Before the Dawn)", a 2011 single by Infinite

== Literature ==
- Before the Dawn (1934 novel), by Eric Temple Bell
- Before the Dawn (novel), a novel by Tōson Shimazaki
- Before the Dawn (Wade book), a 2006 popular science book by Nicholas Wade

== See also ==
- Before Dawn (disambiguation)
