= Remix Collection (Kai Tracid album) =

Remix album by Kai Tracid

Remix Collection is a remixed collection of Kai Tracid's works from Skywalker 1999 (1999), Trance & Acid (2002) and Contemplate (the reason you exist) (2003) released on 13 December 2012.

== Track listing ==
Remix Collection
No.	Title	Length
1.	"Destiny's Path (Orchestra Mix)"	3:22
2.	"4 Just 1 Day (ATB Remix)"	8:57
3.	"Conscious (Ferry Corsten Remix)"	6:59
4.	"Life Is Too Short (RMB Remix)"	8:12
5.	"Too Many Times (Warmduscher Remix)"	6:07
6.	"Tiefenrausch (The Deep Blue) (A*S*Y*S* Remix)"	8:46
7.	"Trance & Acid (Derb Remix)"	6:57
8.	"Liquid Skies (Polaris Lab Mix)"	7:29
9.	"Your Own Reality (Tracid Mix)"	6:46
10.	"Dance for Eternity (Groover Mix)"	7:06
11.	"Life Is 2 Short (Thomas P. Heckmann Remix)"	6:52
12.	"4 Just 1 Day (Emmanuel Top Remix)"	7:39
13.	"Destiny's Path (Warmduscher Remix)"	6:20
14.	"Conscious (Kan Cold Mix)"	8:29
15.	"Trance & Acid (Tomcraft Remix)"	7:42
16.	"Tiefenrausch (The Deep Blue) (Oliver Lieb Remix)"	7:31
17.	"Too Many Times (Yoda Remix)"	5:51
18.	"Life Is 2 Short (Kenji Ogura vs. Melanie Di Tria Remix)"	6:25
19.	"Conscious (A*S*Y*S* Remix)"	7:13
20.	"4 Just 1 Day (Derb Remix)"	9:21
