= Life Is Too Short =

Life Is Too Short may refer to:

== Music ==
- Life Is...Too Short, a 1988 album by Too Short
- Life Is Too Short, a song by Modern Talking from their 2003 album Universe
- Life Is Too Short, a song by Scorpions from their 2001 album Acoustica
- Life Is Too Short, a song by Kai Tracid from their 2002 album Trance & Acid

== Television ==
- Life's Too Short (TV series), a BBC2 television observational comedy sitcom series

== See also ==
- Life's Too Short (disambiguation)
