= Life's Too Short =

Life's Too Short may refer to:

- Life's Too Short (album), 1991 album by Marshall Crenshaw
- Life's Too Short (TV series), a 2011 British sitcom mockumentary
- "Life's Too Short" (Disney song), from Disney's Frozen
- "Life's Too Short" (Tinashe song), 2019
- "Life's Too Short" (Aespa song), 2022
- "Life's Too Short" (Six Feet Under episode), 2001
- "Life's Too Short", a song by the Filipino boy band BGYO, from the 2026 EP On Demand

== See also ==
- Life Is Too Short (disambiguation)
- Ars longa, vita brevis, an aphorism roughly meaning "skilfulness takes time and life is short"
