= The Remix Collection =

The Remix Collection may refer to:

- The Remix Collection (Boyz II Men album), 1995
- The Remix Collection (Kim Wilde album),
- The Remix Collection (Natacha Atlas album), 2000
- Remix Collection (CeCe Peniston album)
- Remix Collection (Kai Tracid album)
- Remix Collection (Show Luo album), 2010
- Remix Collection (Cory Lee album), 2008
