= All for You =

All for You may refer to:

== Music ==
=== Albums ===
- All for You (Annihilator album), and the title song, 2004
- All for You (Janet Jackson album), and the title song (see below), 2001
- All for You (Show Lo album), 2011
- All for You (Titanium album), and the title song, 2012
- All for You (EP), and the title song, by Sechs Kies, 2020
- All for You: a Dedication to the Nat King Cole Trio, by Diana Krall, 1996
- The Best of Cold Chisel, subtitled All for You, 2011

=== Songs ===
- "All for You" (1943 song), 1943
- "All for You" (Ace of Base song), 2010
- "All for You" (Cian Ducrot song), 2022
- "All for You" (Janet Jackson song), 2001
- "All for You" (Kate Ryan song), 2006
- "All for You" (Namie Amuro song), 2004
- "All for You" (Sister Hazel song), 1997
- "All for You", by Atreyu from The End Is Not the End
- "All for You", by Black Label Society from Stronger than Death
- "All for You", by David Baerwald from Bedtime Stories
- "All for You", by Goodnight Nurse from Always and Never
- "All for You", by In This Moment from The Dream
- "All for You", by Little Brother from The Minstrel Show
- "All for You", by MIKESCHAIR from A Beautiful Life
- "All for You", by Motörhead from Rock 'n' Roll
- "All for You", by Opshop from Until the End of Time
- "All for You", by Our Lady Peace from Gravity
- "All for You", by Vaeda from State of Nature
- "All for You", by Wilkinson
- "All for You", by Years & Years from Palo Santo
- "All for You", from the musical Seussical

== Other uses ==
- All for You Tour, a 2001 tour by Janet Jackson
- "All for You", a Star Wars Tales story collected in Star Wars Tales Volume 5

== See also ==
- All 4 U (disambiguation)
