= List of best-selling albums in Taiwan =

This is the list of best-selling albums in Taiwan since the 1990s. Seven domestic albums and one international album have shipped over a million copies in Taiwan. Hong Kong singer Jacky Cheung is the best-selling artist in Taiwan, with three albums sold over one million copies, while Taiwanese singer A-Mei is the best-selling female artist in Taiwan. Taiwan's album sales peaked in the 1990s, but it was adversely affected by the copyright infringement and Internet downloads since the 21st century.

Sales certifications in Taiwan are awarded by the Recording Industry Foundation in Taiwan (RIT) since August 1996. Sales figures for records released prior to 1989 are not included in this list due to unavailable statistics.

== List of best-selling albums ==
Year	Album	Artist(s)	Sales amount	Ref(s)
1997	Bad Boy	A-Mei	1,380,000	
1993	The Goodbye Kiss	Jacky Cheung	1,360,000	
1995	True Love Compilation	Jacky Cheung	1,220,000	
1996	Sisters	A-Mei	1,210,000	
1998	Love Like Pacific Ocean	Richie Jen	1,200,000	
1997	Titanic: Music from the Motion Picture	James Horner	1,164,229	
1992	The Words After Drunk	Jody Chiang	1,160,000	
1996	How Could I Forget You?	Jacky Cheung	1,060,000	
1989	Talk to You, Listen to You	Sarah Chen	1,020,000	
1993	Blessings	Jacky Cheung	910,000	
1999	Can I Hug You, Lover?	A-Mei	860,000	
1997	Wanna Go for a Walk with You	Jacky Cheung	820,000	
1994	Mystery	Faye Wong	800,000	
1993	Me And You	Jacky Cheung	800,000	
1995	Love, Sandy	Sandy Lam	800,000	
1997	You Make Me Free Make Me Fly!	A-Mei	800,000	
1998	Holding Hands	A-Mei	799,097	
1992	Love Like Tides	Jeff Chang	790,000	
1992	Light	Stella Chang	750,000–780,000	
1994	Fate	Andy Lau	750,000–780,000	
1994	Waiting	Jeff Chang	750,000–780,000	
1996	The Cloud Knows?	Valen Hsu	750,000–780,000	
1998	Di Da Di	Coco Lee	750,000–780,000	
1997	Want to Feel the Breeze with You	Jacky Cheung	706,079	
1996	Worth It	Sammi Cheng	700,000	
1997	Kinmen Wang, Lee Ping-hui	Kinmen Wang, Lee Ping-hui	700,000	
1997	Love Deep	Andy Lau	691,092	
1997	Cruel Love Letter	Power Station	642,460	
1996	Falling into You	Celine Dion	633,518	
1990	Falling in Love With Someone Who Doesn't Come Home	Sandy Lam	600,000	
1994	Nothing Will Stop Me From Loving You	Wakin Chau	600,000	
1995	Wu Bai Live	Wu Bai	600,000	
1996	Too Softhearted	Richie Jen	600,000	
1997	Waiting for you	Sammi Cheng	600,000	
1998	Lonely Tree, Lonely Bird	Wu Bai	600,000	
1999	I Deserved	Sammi Cheng	550,000	
1997	Never Say! Love You	Ronald Cheng	515,468	
1997	Let's Talk About Love	Celine Dion	500,000	
1994	Sky	Faye Wong	500,000	
1995	Something to Remember	Madonna	500,000	
2000	Don't Stop	Jolin Tsai	500,000	
1997	Quit Falling in Love	Ronald Cheng	470,682	
2001	Fantasy	Jay Chou	460,000	
1995	HIStory: Past, Present and Future, Book I	Michael Jackson	450,000	
1997	Faye Wong	Faye Wong	450,000	
1999	1019	Jolin Tsai	450,000	
1999	First Love	Hikaru Utada	450,000	
1996	Duck	Tarcy Su	430,269	
1999	I'm Ok	David Tao	430,000	
1999	Running Through 1999	Jacky Cheung	420,000	
1997	Love Is a Miracle	Andy Lau	413,975	
2000	New Century Collection	A-Mei	410,000	
1996	Because of Love	Andy Lau	403,856	
2000	My Desired Happiness	Stefanie Sun	400,000	
2002	The Eight Dimensions	Jay Chou	400,000	
1993	I Believe	Wakin Chau	400,000	
1991	Dangerous	Michael Jackson	400,000	
1997	Best 13 Song Collection	Valen Hsu	375,134	
1997	Summer Night Wind	Wu Bai	370,705	
2000	Regardless	A-Mei	360,000	
2003	Magic	Jolin Tsai	360,000	
1998	Promises & Lies	Lee E-jun	350,130	
2000	Viva Love	Mayday	350,000	
2001	People Life, Ocean Wild	Mayday	350,000	
2003	Yeh Hui-Mei	Jay Chou	350,000	
1996	The End of Love	Wu Bai	347,907	
1998	Stupid Fellow	Andy Lau	345,854	
2000	Yan Zi	Stefanie Sun	330,000	
1996	Don't Love Me	Ronald Cheng	325,533	
2000	Blossom in Red	Elva Hsiao	320,000	
1993	Music Box	Mariah Carey	320,000	
1992	The Bodyguard	Whitney Houston	305,000	
1997	Not for Sale	Faye Wong	303,432	
1996	Tear Sea	Valen Hsu	301,089	
1999	Mayday's First Album	Mayday	300,000	
2001	Kite	Stefanie Sun	300,000	
2003	Super Star	S.H.E	300,000	
2003	The Power of Love	Fish Leong	300,000	
2004	Castle	Jolin Tsai	300,000	
2004	Common Jasmin Orange	Jay Chou	300,000	

== Best-selling album by year ==
Year	Album	Artist(s)	Sales	Ref(s)
1999	Can I Hug You? Lover	A-Mei	1,000,000	
2000	I'm OK	David Tao	425,000	
2001	My Desired Happiness	Stefanie Sun	400,000	
2002	The Eight Dimensions	Jay Chou	350,000	
2003	Yeh Hui-Mei	Jay Chou	335,000	
2004	Common Jasmin Orange	Jay Chou	320,000	
2005	November's Chopin	Jay Chou	250,000	
2006	Dancing Diva	Jolin Tsai	210,000	
2007	Agent J	Jolin Tsai	187,000	
2008	Poetry of the Day After	Mayday	205,000	
2009	Butterfly	Jolin Tsai	130,000	
2010	Rashomon	Show Lo	155,000	
2011	Only for You	Show Lo	150,000	
2012	Good Show	Show Lo	135,000	
2013	Lion Roar	Show Lo	120,000	
2014	The Best of 1999–2013	Mayday	100,000	
2016	History of Tomorrow	Mayday	—	
2019	Ugly Beauty	Jolin Tsai	—	
2020	New World	Hua Chenyu	—	
2021	Strange Pool	Oaeen	—	
2022	Greatest Works of Art	Jay Chou	200,000	

== See also ==
- Music of Taiwan
