= Expert Show =

- Expert Show autographed edition cover

Studio album 達人Show by Show Lo
- Released: 22 October 2004
- Genre: Mandopop, Hip-hop
- Length: 44:27
- Language: Mandarin
- Label: Avex Taiwan
- Producer: Di Zi, Bi Guoyong, Guo Jianlian, Chen Zihong

Show Lo chronology
Show Time (2003)	Expert Show (2004)	Hypnosis Show (2005)

Alternative cover

Expert Show (Chinese: 達人Show) is Taiwanese Mandopop artist Show Lo's second Mandarin studio album. It was released on 22 October 2004 by Avex Taiwan. A second collectible edition, Expert Show (Collectible Edition) (達人Show 影音珍藏版) (CD+VCD) was released on 25 November 2004 with a bonus VCD containing four music videos.

The album features collaborations with Dee Shu (aka Xiao S) and Taiwanese boy band Energy and the music video for "小丑魚" (Clown Fish) features Rainie Yang. It also contains two songs composed by Show and the ending theme song of Taiwanese drama Outsider II (鬥魚2), starring Show.

== Album ==
Following Show Lo's J-hip hop debut album Show Time, he broadened the 'hip hop culture' with an Eastern European style. In this he continues his partnership with producers Golden Melody Award winner and songwriter Di Zi (Chinese: 阿弟仔), Bi Guoyong (Chinese: 畢國勇) and Guo Jianliang (Chinese: 郭建良); plus Chen Zihong (Chinese: 陳子鴻) as well as choreographer Tommy (Chinese: 大目) of Dance Soul studios.

- The first lead track, "機器娃娃" (Robotic Doll), is a hip hop number about the prevalence of electronic pets and on-line relationships.
- The other lead track, "戀愛達人" (Love Expert), is a mid-tempo R&B duet with Dee Shu, that talks about a couple's interaction with each other in their love of fun. It is a cover of "I Believe" by German R&B group Bro'Sis. The music video was directed by Golden Melody Award winner Kuang Sheng (Chinese: 鄺盛). It features Luo and Hsu, who play a couple who wanting a night out separate from each other, goes clubbing but bumps into each other thereby starting a game of who's-got-the-upper-hand.
- "灰色空間" (Grey Dimension) is the ending theme song of Taiwanese drama Outsider II (鬥魚), starring Luo. It is a cover of power ballad '사랑하면 할수록' Sarang hamyon hal soorok (If we are in love, then...) the theme song of Korean movie The Classic.
- The music video for "小丑魚" (Clown Fish) features Taiwanese artist Rainie Yang.
- The track and music video for "一起走吧" (Let's Go) features Taiwanese boy band Energy.
- The tracks "給你管" (Serves You Right) and "剌青" (Tattoo) were composed by Show.

== Reception ==
The highest chart position the album achieved was two. The track "戀愛達人" (Love Expert) featuring Dee Shu is listed at number 30 on Hit Fm Taiwan's Hit Fm Annual Top 100 Singles Chart (Hit-Fm年度百首單曲) for 2004.

The track "機器娃娃" (Robotic Doll) won several awards including, one of the Songs of the Year at the 2005 Metro Radio Mandarin Music Awards presented by Hong Kong radio station Metro Info, Top 10 Mandarin Song at the 2nd Hits Song Awards in 2005, and Top 10 Gold Song (Taiwan) at the 3rd South-East Music Chart Awards in 2005.

The tracks "機器娃娃" (Robotic Doll) was nominated and "戀愛達人" (Love Expert) won one of the Top 10 Gold Songs at the Hong Kong TVB8 Awards, presented by television station TVB8, in 2005.

== Track listing ==
#	Original Title	Pinyin	English	Remarks	Producer	Length
1.	"機器娃娃"	Ji Qi Wa Wa	Robotic Doll		Di Zi	3:59
2.	"戀愛達人"	Lian Ai Da Ren	Love Expert	feat Dee Shu	Guo Jianliang	3:30
3.	"給你管"	Gei Ni Guan	Serves You Right	composed by Show Lo	Di Zi	3:10
4.	"小丑魚"	Xiao Chou Yu	Clown Fish		Guo Jianliang	4:41
5.	"咕嚕雞"	Gu Lu Ji	Sweet and Sour Chicken		Di Zi	3:32
6.	"瞎攪和"	Xia Jiao He	Blindly Mixed		Di Zi	5:00
7.	"灰色空間"	Hui Se Kong Jian	Grey Dimension	Outsiders II ending theme	Chen Zihong	3:59
8.	"Magic Show"				Bi Guoyong	3:35
9.	"歲堤春曉"	Sui Ti Chun Xiao	Early Spring		Di Zi	4:03
10.	"剌青"	Ci Qing	Tattoo	composed by Show Lo	Guo Jianliang	4:46
11.	"一起走吧"	Yi Qi Zou Ba	Let's Go	feat Energy	Di Zi / Bi Guoyong	3:47

== Music videos ==
- "機器娃娃" (Robotic Doll) - directed by Lai Wei Kang/Bill Chia
- "戀愛達人" (Love Expert) - feat Xiao S - directed by Kuang Sheng
- "小丑魚" (Clown Fish) - feat Rainie Yang
- "灰色空間" (Grey Dimension) - includes clips from Outsider II
- "一起走吧" (Let's Go) - feat Energy
- "瞎攪和" (Blindly Mixed)

== Releases ==
Two editions were released by Avex Taiwan:

- 22 October 2004 - Expert Show (CD)
- 25 November 2004 - Expert Show (Collectible Edition) (達人Show 影音珍藏版) (CD+VCD) - includes VCD with four music videos:
1. "機器娃娃" (Robotic Doll)
2. "戀愛達人" (Love Expert) - feat Dee Shu
3. "小丑魚" (Clown Fish) - feat Rainie Yang
4. "灰色空間" (Grey Dimension)

== Charts ==
Hit Fm Annual Top 100 Singles Chart - 2004
Track name	Position
"戀愛達人" (Love Expert)	#30
