= Hi My Sweetheart =

2009 Taiwanese drama

- Promotional poster
- Also known as: 海派甜心; Hai Pai Tian Xin
- Genre: Romance, Comedy
- Written by: Yang Bifeng; Jiang Hua; Chen Hongjie; Luo Xini
- Directed by: Lin He Long (林合隆)
- Starring: Show Lo; Rainie Yang; Lee Wei
- Opening theme: "愛瘋頭" (Head Over Heels in Love) by700 Show Lo
- Ending theme: "雨愛" (Rainie Love) by Rainie Yang
- Country of origin: Republic of China (Taiwan)
- Original language: Mandarin
- No. of episodes: 14 (90 - 135 mins per episode with commercial); 23 (60 mins per episode with commercial)

Production
- Executive producers: Linyin Sheng; Liu Yucheng
- Producer: Chai Zhi Ping
- Production locations: Hangzhou (China), Kaohsiung (Taiwan)
- Cinematography: Huang Fengming
- Editors: Chen Liren, Lin Yu Xun
- Running time: 90 mins (Sundays at 22:00 to 23:30)
- Production company: Comic Ritz International Production

Original release
- Network: Chinese Television System (CTS)
- Release: 1 November 2009 – 31 January 2010

Related
- Roseate Love (紫玫瑰); Because of You (星光下的童話)

Hi My Sweetheart (Chinese: 海派甜心; pinyin: Hai Pai Tian Xin) is a 2009 Taiwanese drama starring Show Lo, Rainie Yang and Lee Wei. It was produced by Comic Ritz International Production (可米瑞智國際藝能有限公司) and Chai Zhi Ping (柴智屏) as producer and directed by Lin He Long (林合隆). It started filming on 26 July 2009 and wrapped on 23 November 2009. It was filmed in Kaohsiung, Taiwan and Hangzhou, China.

The series was first broadcast in Taiwan on free-to-air Chinese Television System (CTS) (華視) from 1 November 2009 to 31 January 2010, every Sunday at 22:00 to 23:30 and cable TV Gala Television (GTV) Variety Show/CH 28 (八大綜合台) on 8 November 2009 to 7 February 2010, every Sunday at 20:00 to 21:30.

The 23 episode series follows the romance between Xue Hai and Chen Bao Zhu, beginning from their college days until their late 20s.

Hi My Sweetheart was nominated in 2010 in five categories at the 45th Golden Bell Awards, including Best Television Series and Best Actor for Show Lo. Rainie Yang who portrayed Chen Bao Zhu in the drama, won Best Actress at the award ceremony in October.

== Summary ==
Xue Hai (Show Lo) is a certifiable dork who comes from a wealthy family and had been protected by his oldest sister, Xue Bo, for most of his life. One day, at age 20, he decided to move out of his comfort zone and study abroad in Hangzhou, China. To protect his identity as the heir of his family's wealth, Xue Bo gave him an alias "Lin Da Lang," who is supposed to be a poor student.

At Zhejiang University, Da Lang meets Chen Bao Zhu (Rainie Yang): an eccentric, friendless alpha female social rebel. Da Lang becomes unconditionally persistent for her friendship and endlessly delivers a peaceful and constant variable of support and acceptance to her neglected life. Unaware of Da Lang's background, Bao Zhu teaches him the norms and social baby steps of everyday life. As she begins to drop her guard, Da Lang vows to always be with her, and they fall in love. During this time, Chen Bao Zhu's father goes bankrupt and flees, leaving her and her mother behind. Using Bao Zhu's father as an example of poverty and failure, Bao Zhu's mother refuses to accept Da Lang's relationship with her daughter and orders her to break up with Da Lang or she will prevent his graduation. Out of fear for Da Lang, Bao Zhu lies to her mother in a note and agrees to an arranged marriage. Secretly, however, Bao Zhu plans to elope with Da Lang. At the same time, Da Lang – unaware of the conflict – wishes to propose and confess his true identity and wealth to Bao Zhu. On Bao Zhu's birthday, Da Lang and Bao Zhu make plans to meet, both unaware of each other's mutual objectives for a joint future. Da Lang purchases an engagement ring and heads to the meeting spot, but as Bao Zhu leaves to meet Da Lang, she is hit by a car and knocked unconscious for months. Da Lang continues to wait, but she never shows. Worried, Da Lang later visits her home, and Bao Zhu's mother lies to him and reports she is in Europe and will soon marry someone else for money, showing him the note Bao Zhu left. Unaware of Bao Zhu's true intentions, Da Lang comes to the conclusion he was recklessly abandoned by his first love. Xue Hai drops his alias of Da Lang, loses his simplistic innocent take on life and vows not to ever commit to a relationship again.

Three years later, back in Kaohsiung, Xue Hai has transformed himself into an egocentric playboy who openly flaunts his wealth. Xue Hai overhears Bao Zhu's familiar voice on the radio as a local DJ, and feeling he is now unrecognizable, buys the radio station to seek revenge on Bao Zhu. Hiding his identity as Da Lang, Xue Hai plans to coerce Bao Zhu into falling in love with his new self, only to then dump her harshly in revenge. However, after seeing Bao Zhu with He Yan Feng (Lee Wei), her high school senior/judo master, Xue Hai becomes jealous and soon realizes that he still has feelings for her. Xue Hai then sets his mind on destroying the relationship of Bao Zhu and her "boyfriend", while he continually pursues her, often forgetting whether it's out of love or revenge.

Still intent on finding her lost love, Da Lang, Bao Zhu is resistant to Xue Hai's advances. Xue Hai, knowing that he cannot begin a relationship with Bao Zhu unless she gets over Da Lang, lies and tells her that he has found Da Lang and that Da Lang is now happily married. Distraught, Bao Zhu flies back to Hangzhou to revisit and hopefully bury her memories with Da Lang.

Back in Kaohsiung, college classmate Mo Lee visits the station. Mo Lee accidentally reveals to Bao Zhu that Xue Hai and Da Lang are the same person. Angry that Xue Hai has been lying to her all this time, Bao Zhu angrily tells Xue Hai that she never wants to see him again and plans to leave the country with He Yan Feng.

Before they leave, though, there is a fire in the radio station, trapping Bao Zhu in the building. Xue Hai, wanting to save his love, rushes in but is hit on the head and trapped under a wooden beam while trying to protect Bao Zhu. Unable to get out himself, Xue Hai urges her to go and leave him and she is taken away by He Yan Feng. The firemen are able to pull Xue Hai out of the fire, but he is unconscious. Distraught that he is seriously injured, Bao Zhu is convinced that it is her fault. She realizes he truly loves her and that she loves him too, whether he is Da Lang or Xue Hai.

When Xue Hai wakes up, no one is there and he stumbles out of the hospital onto a toy store owned by a mother and daughter. He has lost his memory, and unable to find his true identity, the mother and daughter kindly take him in. Xue Hai lives with the two in his old self Da Lang, having no idea of his actual identity. Bao Zhu searches for him for months, and finally stumbles across the store and finds Xue Hai, but discovers that he has forgotten everyone in his life – including her. Determined to get him back she brings him to many places that could remind him of their previous relationship. But after realizing that he does not remember her and in fact has started to like the toy store owner's daughter, Bao Zhu decides to leave with He Yan Feng to Britain. But before she has a chance to even consider it, Da Lang is kidnapped by his oldest sister's evil boyfriend and held for ransom. He is knocked out when he tries to escape and the blow to the head brings his memory back. However, he continues to lie about remembering Bao Zhu because he believes she is still with He Yan Feng and doesn't want to mess up her life anymore.

On Bao Zhu's birthday, Xue Hai, drunk, accidentally emails Bao Zhu a birthday greeting which reveals that he really does remember her. He wakes up in the middle of the night and, realizing his mistake, manages to delete the email on her laptop. However, Bao Zhu has already seen the email and knows that Xue Hai remembers her. But she pretends she hasn't seen the email, and asks Xue Hai to meet her later. That night, they meet and she reveals she knows he remembers her. She then proposes to him. Xue Hai accepts and the two get married and live happily ever after.

== Cast ==
=== Main cast ===
Actor	Character	Relationships
Show Lo	Xue Hai (薛海) / Lin Da Lang (林達浪)	Chen Bao Zhu's boyfriend in College.
Rainie Yang	Chen Bao Zhu (陳寶茱)	Xue Hai / Lin Da Lang's girlfriend in College.
Lee Wei (李威)	He Yan Feng (何言風)	Xue Hai / Lin Da Lang's rival and Chen Bao Zhu's high school senior.
Maggie Wu (吳亞馨)	Mo Li (莫莉)	Chen Bao Zhu's rival and Xue Hai / Lin Da Lang's old crush.
Fang Fang (方芳)	Xue Bo (薛波)	Xue Hai's eldest sister
Xiang Yu Jie (向語潔)	Xue Pei (薛佩)	Xue Hai's second sister

=== Supporting cast ===
Actor	Character	Relationships
Nikki Deng (邵庭)	Wang Ye Qian (王野倩)	Bao Zhu's nemesis
Zhang Yi Mei (娜娜)	Li Jia Jia (李佳佳)	Bao Zhu's nemesis
Wang Yue (王月)	Wang Yu Lan (王玉蘭)	Bao Zhu's mother
Wen Shuai (文帥)	Chen Run Fa (陳潤發)	Xue Bo's boyfriend
Jiang Qi Lin (江奇霖)	Ba Shuang (巴雙)	Xue Hai's roommate in Hangzhou
Liu Rui (劉銳)	Wu Ke (伍科)	Xue Hai's roommate in Hangzhou
Chen Bi Wei (陳筆威)	Gao Gang (高剛)	Xue Hai & Bao Zhu's classmate and bully
Shi Zhen Long (史振龍)	Ah Gen (阿根)	Gao Gang's sidekick
Yin Chong Zhen (尹崇珍)	Hui Min (慧敏)	Xue Hai's PA
Joh Cheng Mun (賴亭君)	Christina	Xue Hai's girlfriend
Xie Li Jin (謝麗金)	radio station director (電台台長)	Bao Zhu's boss

== Multimedia ==
=== Music ===
- Opening theme song: "愛瘋頭" (Head Over Heels) by Show Lo
- Ending theme song: "雨愛" (Rainie Love) by Rainie Yang

Insert songs

- "青春鬥" (Youth Bucket) by Rainie Yang
- "匿名的好友" (Anonymous Friend) by Rainie Yang
- "愛不單行" (Love Doesn't Travel Alone) by Show Lo
- "生理時鐘" (Biological Clock) by Show Lo
- "In Your Eyes" by Rainie Yang & Show Lo

The songs were released by the respective artists: Show Lo - 7th album Rashomon and Rainie Yang - 5th album Rainie & Love...?

=== Books ===
- Hi My Sweetheart TV Drama Novel (海派甜心電視小說) - ISBN 978-986-7010-99-5
- Hi My Sweetheart Photobook (海派甜心電視寫真) - ISBN 978-986-6278-00-6

== Reception ==
Chinese Television System (CTS) Ratings
Episode	Original Broadcast Date	Average	Rank	Peak	Remark
	25 October 2009	1.48	2		Hi My Sweetheart Behine-the-scene Special 你是海派我甜心-幕後特輯
1	1 November 2009	2.19	2		
2	8 November 2009	2.09	2		
3	15 November 2009	1.93	2		
4	22 November 2009	2.21	2		
5	29 November 2009	2.67	2		
6	6 December 2009	2.91	2	3.50	
7	13 December 2009	2.92	2		
8	20 December 2009	3.07	2		
9	27 December 2009	3.52	2	4.17	
10	3 January 2010	4.12	2	5.64	120 mins
11	10 January 2010	4.08	2	5.10	120 mins CTV Momo Love series finale
12	17 January 2010	4.26	2	5.23	120 mins Overall watched by 2,580,000 people CTV Down With Love Behine-the-scene Special
13	24 January 2010	5.14	2	6.88	135 mins CTV Down With Love World Premiere Party
14	31 January 2010	5.00	2	5.43	45 mins CTV Down With Love premiere
Average		3.29	2		

Rival dramas on air at the same time:

- China Television (CTV) (中視): Momo Love / Down With Love
- Taiwan Television (TTV) (台視): Autumn's Concerto
- Formosa Television (FTV) (民視): 華麗一族

== Awards and nominations ==
45th Golden Bell Awards (金鐘獎), Taiwan - 2010
Nomination	Category	Result
Hi My Sweetheart	Best Television Series	Nominated
Show Lo	Best Actor	Nominated
Rainie Yang	Best Actress	Won
Fang Fang	Best Supporting Actress	Nominated
Lin He Long	Best Director in a Television Series	Nominated

== Production credits ==
- Producer: Chai Zhi Ping (柴智屏)
- Executive Producers: Lin Yinsheng (林寅生), Liu Yucheng (劉玉成)
- Screenplay co-ordination: An Jie (安婕)
- Writers: Yang Bifeng (楊碧鳳), Jiang Hua (蔣家驊), Chen Hongjie (陳虹潔), Luo Qianni (羅茜妮)
- Director: Lin Helong (林合隆)
- Deputy Director: Li Duanqian (李端倩)
- Cinematographer: Huang Fengming (黃峰銘)
- Editors: Chen Liren (陳立人), Lin Yuxun (林于薰)
- Continuity: Wang Yuxun (王郁勳)
- Music arranger: Chen Qi (陳建騏), Chen Zicheng (陳子澄)
- Music Director: Chen Qianru (陳倩如)
- Music Producer: Li Jixian (李繼賢)
- Labels: Gold Typhoon (Taiwan), Sony Music Taiwan
