= Kai Tracid =

German Trance DJ and producer

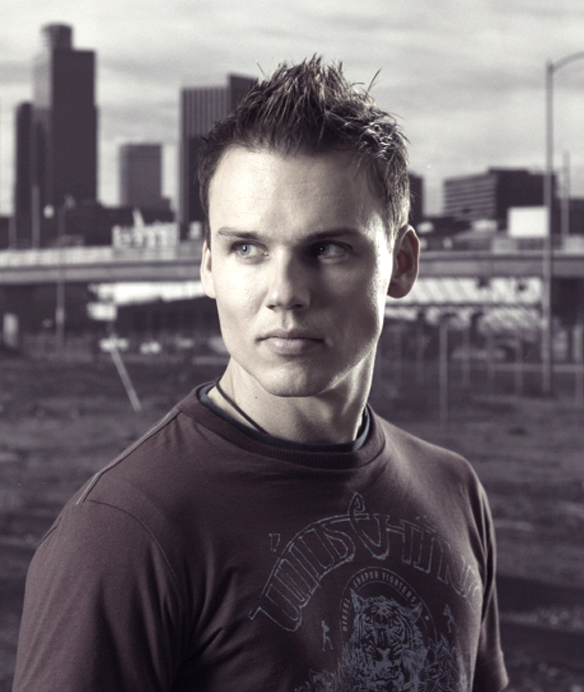
- Kai Tracid in 2002

Background information
- Also known as: Acut Genius, Aeon FX, Arrow, Attractor, The, Christian Phoenix, Computer Controlled, Formic Acid, K, Kai MacDonald, Kenji Ogura, Mac Acid, Mac Music, TBA, Tek, Tyrone T.B., W.O.W.
- Born: Kai Franz; 17 January 1972 (age 54); Frankfurt, West Germany
- Origin: Germany
- Genres: Trance, hard trance, acid trance, Techno
- Occupations: Composer, songwriter, producer, remixer
- Years active: 1997 – present
- Labels: Tracid Traxxx, Tracid Digital

Kai Franz (born 17 January 1972), known professionally as Kai Tracid, is a German trance DJ and record producer. The name "Tracid" is a portmanteau of the electronic music styles trance and acid.

== Career ==
In Germany he became famous with his first single, "Your Own Reality". In 1998 he gained worldwide fame with Liquid Skies. In November 2001 he got his first Top-10 hit in the German single charts.

In 2009 he took an indefinite hiatus from making music and co-founded a yoga center Balance Yoga.

In February 2020, Tracid announced his return to the scene with the release of his new single "DT64", a collaboration with Moguai.

== Discography ==
=== Albums ===
- Skywalker 1999 (1999)
- Trance & Acid (2002)
- Contemplate (The Reason You Exist) (2003)

=== Remix albums ===
- Remix Collection (2012)

=== Singles ===
Year	Single	Peak chart positions			Album
Year	Single	GER	AUT	SUI	Album
1996	"So Simple"	—	—	—	Singles only
1997	"Makin' Friends"	—	—	—	Singles only
1997	"Your Own Reality"	22	—	—	Skywalker 1999
1998	"Dance For Eternity"	26	—	—	Skywalker 1999
1998	"Liquid Skies"	31	—	—	Skywalker 1999
1999	"Destiny's Path"	29	—	75	Trance & Acid
2000	"Tiefenrausch (The Deep Blue)"	41	—	77	Trance & Acid
2001	"Too Many Times"	24	—	73	Trance & Acid
2001	"Life Is Too Short"	9	32	49	Trance & Acid
2002	"Trance & Acid"	37	—	—	Trance & Acid
2002	"4 Just 1 Day"	12	38	—	Contemplate (The Reason You Exist)
2003	"Conscious"	44	—	—	Singles only
2007	"Inflator/Aural Border"	—	—	—	Singles only
2007	"Depressive Mood/Discreet Charm"	—	—	—	Singles only
2020	"DT64" (with Moguai)	—	—	—	Singles only
2020	"Freedom of Expression" (with A*S*Y*S)	—	—	—	Singles only
"—" denotes a recording that did not chart or was not released.

=== Other aliases ===
- Acid Train / Sweat Room (1995) As A*S*Y*S
- Acid Squid (1996) As A*S*Y*S
- Radon (1996) As Mac Acid II
- Only The Strong (1996) As K
- Waveshaper (1999) As K
- The Spice (1999) As Arrakis
- Auf Die Fresse / Säurebad (1999) As Warmduscher
- Säurebad (The Remixes) (1999) As Warmduscher
- Acid Save Your Soul (1999) As A*S*Y*S
- Acid Head Cracker (2000) As A*S*Y*S
- 10 Kleine Bassdrums (2000) As Warmduscher
- Acid Nightmare / DJ's Nightmare (2001) As A*S*Y*S
- Hardcore Will Never Die (2002) As Warmduscher feat. Lamont Humphrey
- From Past To Phuture (2003) As A*S*Y*S
- No More Fucking Rock'n'Roll (2004) As A*S*Y*S
- Acid Flash (2005) As A*S*Y*S
- Cheers (2007) As A*S*Y*S
