= Trendy Man =

Studio album by Show Lo
- Released: December 26, 2008
- Recorded: 2008
- Genre: Mandopop
- Length: 36:49
- Language: Mandarin
- Label: Gold Typhoon (Taiwan)

Show Lo chronology
Show On Cruel Stage (2008)	Trendy Man (2008)	Rashomon (2010)

Trendy Man (Chinese: 潮男正傳; pinyin: Cháo nán zhèng zhuàn) is the sixth Mandarin studio album by Taiwanese recording artist Show Lo. It was released on December 26, 2008, by Gold Typhoon (Taiwan). It is the first release after Show's continuation of contract with them, formerly EMI Music Taiwan.

== Release ==
Two preorder limited editions were available: Trendy Man (Mirror Limited Preorder Edition) (潮男正傳 潮男幻鏡珍藏版) and a Box Limited Preorder Edition (潮男正傳 潮男誌盒裝版), which includes gifts. A further edition was released, Waist Support Celebration Edition (2CD) (潮男正傳 撐腰相挺慶功2CD版) containing a bonus CD with a new song "Song Written for You".

== Songs ==
The track "Best of the Bunch" (箇中強手) is a high-tempo dance track, and is the opening theme song of Taiwanese drama, Hot Shot (籃球火), starring Show, Jerry Yan and Wu Chun. "Making Jokes" (搞笑), a ballad, is the second lead track, with the music video featuring Alice Tzeng.

The third lead track, "Waist Support" (撐腰) is an upbeat fun dance track. The music video features guest appearance by Party Boys, Barbie Shu, Dee Shu, Jolin Tsai, Blackie/Hei Ren, Da Mu, Hu Gua, Jacky Wu, Chai Zhi Ping, Lin He Long and Luo Ma Ma "Cause I Believe" (幸福不滅) a piano ballad is an insert song of Hot Shot (籃球火).

== Commercial performance ==
The album debuted at number one on Taiwan's Top 20 G-Music Weekly Combo and Mandarin Charts, and Five Music Chart at week starting December 26, 2008, to January 1, 2009, with a percentage sales of 32.32%, 37.8%, and 31.54% respectively. It charted continuously in the Mandarin Chart for 19 weeks, the Combo Chart for 13 weeks and the 5 Music Chart for 15 weeks.

The tracks "Waist Support" and "Making Jokes" are listed at number 30 and 61 respectively on Hit Fm Taiwan's Hit Fm Annual Top 100 Singles Chart for 2009. The track "Waist Support" won one of the Songs of the Year at the 2009 Metro Radio Mandarin Music Awards presented by Hong Kong radio station Metro Info.

According to Taiwan's G-Music chart the album is the second best selling album in Taiwan in 2009. It was also awarded one of the Top 10 Selling Mandarin Albums of the Year award at the 2009 IFPI Hong Kong Album Sales Awards, presented by the Hong Kong branch of IFPI.

== Track listing ==
Trendy Man – Standard edition
No.	Title	Lyrics	Music	Translation	Length
1.	"撐腰" (Chēng Yāo)	Wu Yiwei (吳易緯)	Vincent Degiorgio, Niklas Pettersson, Mikael Albertsson	Waist Support	3:19
2.	"高調愛" (Gāo Diào Ài)	David Ke (葛大為)	Michael Lin (林邁可)	High-Toned Love	3:45
3.	"第二順位" (Dì Èr Shùn Wèi)	Matthew Yen (嚴云農)	Shane Chaw (曹軒賓)	Second Priority	4:24
4.	"搞笑" (Gǎo Xiào)	Issac Chen (陳鎮川)	Paul Lee (李偉菘)	Making Jokes	4:35
5.	"潛意識失控" (Qián Yì Shí Shī Kòng)	Li Zong En (李宗恩)	Jae Chong	Subconsciously out of Control	2:52
6.	"箇中強手" (Gè Zhōng Qiáng Shǒu)	Beautiful	Jonny Pedersen, Michael Jay, Keely Hawkes	Best of the Bunch – HOT SHOT	3:01
7.	"幸福不滅" (Xìng Fú Bù Miè)	Matthew Yen (嚴云農)	Ah Qin (阿沁)	Cause I Believe	3:36
8.	"潮男正傳" (Cháo Nán Zhèng Zhuàn)	Issac Chen (陳鎮川)	Charlie Grant, Pete Woodroffe, Kye Sones, Brett Warren, Brad Jones	Story of a Trendy Man	3:18
9.	"假如你還在這裡" (Jiǎ Rú Nǐ Hái Zài Zhè Lǐ)	Chen Ying Jian (陳穎見) @口袋音樂	Chen Ying Jian (陳穎見)	If You're Still Here	3:51
10.	"拿手絕活" (Ná Shǒu Jué Huó)	David Ke (葛大為)	Anderson Anthony George, Smith Steven Andrew, Dane Deviller Anthony, Sean Hosein Syed	Well-Skilled	3:53

Bonus track – Trendy Man (Waist Support Celebration Edition) (2CD)
No.	Title	Lyrics	Music	Translation	Length
1.	"為你寫首歌" (Wèi Nǐ Xiě Shǒu Gē)	Show Lo (羅志祥)	Gary Chaw (曹格)	Song Written for You	3:54

== Charts ==
=== Weekly charts ===
Chart (2008)	Peak position
Taiwanese Albums (G-Music)	1

=== Year-end charts ===
Chart (2008)	Position
Taiwanese Albums	9
