= Before Dawn =

Before Dawn may refer to:

- Before Dawn (horse) (1979–2006), American racehorse
- Before Dawn: The Music of Yusef Lateef, a 1957 American jazz album featuring Yusef Lateef
- Before Dawn (film), a 1933 American film
- Before Dawn (1953 film), Japanese film directed by Kōzaburō Yoshimura.
- Before Dawn (2024 film), Australian film directed by Jordon Prince-Wright

== See also ==
- Before the Dawn (disambiguation)
