= Shin (singer) =

- Born: 14 May 1971 (age 55)
- Occupations: Singer; songwriter; actor
- Years active: 2001–present
- Musical career
- Origin: Taipei, Taiwan
- Genres: Mandopop, hard rock, heavy metal, pop rock
- Instruments: Vocals, guitar, drums, piano
- Label: Pourquoi Pas Music
- Formerly of: Shin

Shin (simplified Chinese: 苏见信; traditional Chinese: 蘇見信; born Su Chien-hsin on 14 May 1971) is a Taiwanese singer, songwriter, and actor. He is known as the former lead singer of the rock band Shin and a Golden Melody Awards nominee for Best Mandarin Male Singer.

Shin had been singing in pubs for around ten years before becoming a singer. He formed a band with Chris, Michael, Max and Tomi during his pub singing days. They debuted their self-titled album Shin (信樂團同名專輯) in May 2002. On 20 March 2007, he left the band and started his solo career.

== Musical style and vocal characteristics ==
Xin is noted for his wide vocal range and extremely powerful voice which is rare in Mandopop. Shin is also renowned for his high screams while singing rock songs. He got the public attention by singing Scorpions's Still Loving You and other foreign rock band's songs in Harlem Yu's show 音樂大不同. He became popular in mainland China by the song 死了都要愛

Shin's musical style includes Heavy metal, hard rock, pop rock and mandopop in which he mainly sings Hard Rock. He also tried other music genres like nu metal, progressive rock and Britpop in songs such as 再見, 頑強 and 英國的夏天.

== Solo career ==
=== 我就是我 (I'm Just Me) (2007–2008) ===
After leaving the band, in September 2007, Shin released his debut solo album, titled 我就是我. In 2008, he was nominated for Best Mandarin Male Singer at the 19th Golden Melody Awards.

On 21 December 2007, Shin began his debut solo concert tour Starting from Shin: I Am Me (從信開始 我就是我) in Nanjing Olympic Sports Center, where he performed the track "Shut Up" with guest Taiwanese artist Will Pan, which was released in Pan's sixth studio album Play It Cool under label Universal Music Taiwan. The tour continued onto Beijing Workers' Gymnasium and Shanghai Indoor Stadium.

Shin sang a duet "需要你的愛" (Need Your Love) with Taiwanese band F.I.R., which was released on their fourth album Love · Diva.

=== 集樂星球 (Take Me To the Stars) (2008–2009) ===
集樂星球 debuted at #3 in G-music Mandarin Chart in week 43, which is also the highest rank of this album.

On 23 May 2009, Shin played a concert in Capital Indoor Stadium titled "Febia 晶銳集樂星球演唱會".

=== 趁我 (While I) (2009–2011) ===
趁我 is the first commercial success of Shin in Taiwan since his solo career. The album debuted at #3 on G-music Mandarin Chart and hit #1 on G-music Mandarin Chart on week 48.

火燒的寂寞 (The Lonely Fire) and 趁我 (While I) became a hit in both Mainland China and Taiwan. 火燒的寂寞 (The Lonely Fire) was awarded for Most Favourite Mandarin Song at TVB JSG Season's Award.

On 27 August 2010, Shin made an appearance in Back to Basic-Rock Stars Concert (Beijing) (怒放搖滾英雄演唱會北京站).

On 25 September, Shin held a concert with Taiwan singer A-Lin at Club Nokia in Los Angeles.

On 29 November, the single 降龍樂章(Dragon Movement) was released. The song was endorsed for a Mainland online game 降龍之劍 (Dragon Sword).

=== 黎明之前 (Before The Dawn) (2011–2012) ===
Shin released his fourth album on 22 July 2011. The album debuted at #1 on 5music Mandarin Chart. The music video of the first single, Before the Dawn (黎明之前), was directed by 比爾賈, with Taiwan famous artist Barbie Shu as the main actress. However, the music video is banned from broadcasting in Taiwan because of its violence and bloody content.

On 23 September 2011, Shin and A-Lin held a concert titled "One Night in Melbourne" at Dallas Brooks Centre.

On 24 December 2011, Shin held a small concert in Shanghai at Shanghai International Gymnastic Center.

Shin won the Best Male Singer(Taiwan/Hong Kong) in Sprite Music Award. The song Before The Dawn won the Best Song of the Year.

On 6 April 2012, Shin released Before The Dawn (Audio-visual collection). This album includes 5 music videos, 6 live performances and a video of making the album.

On 21 April 2012, Shin started his tour titled "信無畏搖滾巡迴演唱會" (Shin Fearless Rock Tour) in Taipei at Taipei Arena with Anna Tsuchiya and A-Lin as guests. This is the first time that Shin held a concert at Taipei Arena. It is announced that the tour will come to Beijing and Shanghai in November 2012.

=== 我記得 (I Remember) (2012–2014) ===
One of the song from this album, "Embrace in Strong Wind" (狂風裡擁抱) was performed in Shin's concert in Taipei Arena with A-Lin. The Music Video of the duet was released on 7 August. This song soon became a hit in KTV.

On 1 and 16 September, Shin participated in Bloom of Youth rock tour (怒放青春巡迴演唱會) Shenzhen and Quanzhou stations.

On 7 September 2012, Shin released his fifth studio album I Remember. Differing from the past, I Remember is not a rock album. Most of the songs in it are pop love songs. Shin sang softly in this album, unlike the usual.

Shin released his first Cantonese song 太 (a Cantonese version of 我選擇笑) in I Remember (edited version). Shin also remade his famous song 天高地厚 in the edited version.

On 9 July 2014, Shin ended his 12 years relationship with Avex Taiwan and signed a new contract with HIM International Music which allowed him to have more freedom and control in producing his own music.

=== 反正我信了 (Whatever, I Just Believe In) (2015-2016) ===
On 6 March 2015, Shin released the first album 反正我信了(Whatever, I Just Believe In) after signing with HIM International Music.

In 2016 January, Shin participated in Mainland China's singing competition programme I Am a Singer (season 4) and was eliminated in episode 6 despite his impressive performance in attempting alternative songs that are rarely sung in music programmes. He received much respect from the Chinese audience because of his innovative style and courage. He gained a large fan base in China despite his early loss.

=== 大爺們 (Welcome to My World) (2016-present) ===
On 8 December 2016, Shin announced that he will start a new world tour named "信GentleMonster 2017巡回演唱會" (Shin Gentle Monster 2017 Tour) in 2017 and the first concert will be on 20 May 2017 in Taipei Arena. The tour is said to include at least ten cities in Mainland China and Taiwan and potential stations in Malaysia, Singapore and the United States.

On 30 December 2016, the eighth solo studio album 大爺們 (Welcome to My World) was released.

On 19 May 2017, one day before his concert in Taipei Arena, Shin released his greatest hits album SHIN: BEST OF BEST celebrating his 15th Anniversary.

== Discography ==
=== Solo albums ===
| Year | Title | Label |
|---|---|---|
| 30 September 2005 | Special Thanks To... (感謝自選輯) | Avex Taiwan |
| 9 September 2007 | 我就是我 | Avex Taiwan |
| 17 October 2008 | 集樂星球 | Avex Taiwan |
| 20 November 2009 | 趁我 | Avex Taiwan |
| 22 July 2011 | Before the Dawn (黎明之前) | Avex Taiwan |
| 7 September 2012 | I Remember (我記得) | Avex Taiwan |
| 6 March 2015 | Whatever, I Just Believe In (反正我信了) | HIM International Music |
| 30 December 2016 | Welcome to My World (大爺門) | HIM International Music |
| 19 May 2017 | Shin: Best of Best 15th Anniversary Edition (出道15周年精選) | Avex Taiwan |

=== Shin band albums ===
| Year | Title |
|---|---|
| May 2002 | Shin (信樂團同名專輯) |
| April 2003 | Tian Gao Di Hou (天高地厚) |
| February 2004 | Hai Kuo Tian Kong (海闊天空) |
| December 2004 | Tiao Xin (挑信) |
| April 2006 | One Night @ Mars Concert Live (One Night@火星演唱會Live) |

Hit singles

- 2002:《死了都要愛》
- 2002:《一了百了》
- 2002:《世界末日》
- 2002:《One Night In 北京》
- 2003:《離歌》
- 2003:《天高地厚》
- 2004:《千年之戀》
- 2004:《海闊天空》
- 2004:《假如》
- 2007:《我恨你》
- 2007:《傷城》
- 2008:《告別的時代》
- 2009:《火燒的寂寞》
- 2009:《趁我》
- 2011:《黎明之前》
- 2011:《假裝陽光的蠟燭》
- 2011:《遠得要命的愛情》
- 2012:《狂風裡擁抱》
- 2012:《暗藏後悔》
- 2015: 如果你還在就好了
- 2015: 反正我信了
- 2015: 冷火
- 2016: 掌紋算命
- 2016: 唱不完的副歌

=== Soundtrack contributions ===
| Year | Album Information | Tracks Contributed |
|---|---|---|
| 2007 | Summer X Summer Original Soundtrack (熱情仲夏 電視原聲帶) | 累了" (Lei Le) [Tired] - drama ending theme song |
| 2014 | Go, Single Lady - Original Television Soundtrack (as well as in Whatever, I Just Believe In) | 愛情的滋味 - drama theme song |
| 2015 | Heart Of Steel - Original Soundtrack (as well as in Whatever, I Just Believe In) | 傻瓜的冒險 - movie title song |
| 2016 | Call of Heroes - Original Soundtrack (as well as in Welcome to my World) | 鋼鐵心 |
| 2016 | Call of Heroes - Original Soundtrack (as well as in Welcome to my World) | 危城 - movie theme song |
| 2016 | Tourist site 携程旅行Ctrip commercial (as well as in Welcome to my World) | 說走就走 - commercial theme song |
| 2016 | 笑林足球 - Original Soundtrack (as well as in Welcome to my World) | 闖 - movie theme song |
| 2017 | The Mad King of Taipei Town - Original Soundtrack | 越清醒越孤獨 - movie ballade |
| 2017 | Lost Love in Times - Original Television Soundtrack | 淚傷 - drama theme song |
| 2018 | Mobile game 《三國志大戰M》 theme song | 一眼一生 |
| 2018 | Esports 王者榮耀 King Pro League (KPL) 2018 Spring Season | 荣耀征战 - King Pro League spring season theme song |

== Filmography ==
=== Film and television ===
- 死了都要愛 - starring role
- At the Dolphin Bay (海豚灣戀人) - cameo
- Westside Story (西街少年) - Chris, Tomi and Shin cameo
- 2007: Summer x Summer (熱情仲夏) as Sean
- 2008 Honey & Clover (蜂蜜幸運草) as 任以薰
- 2012: 賽車傳奇 as 林司哲
- 2013: Love Retake (愛情不NG) as 鄭直
- 2013: Micro Film 18歲的勇氣 as 信
- 2013: Miro Film 反核 卡到天王篇 as Toy store owner
- 2014: Go, Single Lady 上流俗女 as 何偉成
- 2017: 笑林足球 as 森

=== Variety and reality show ===
- 2016: Singer (season 4)
- 2022: Call Me by Fire (season 2)

== Awards and nominations ==
| Year | Award | Category | Nominated work | Result |
|---|---|---|---|---|
| 2008 | 19th Golden Melody Awards | Best Mandarin Male Singer | 《我就是我》 | Nominated |
| 2009 | Music Radio Music Award | Best Male Singer (Taiwan/HK) | 《趁我》 | Won |
| 2009 | TVB JSG Season's Award | Most Favourite Mandarin Song | 《火燒的寂寞》 | Won |
| 2011 | TVB8 Music Award | Best Male Singer-Songwriter | 《Before the Dawn》 | Won |
| 2012 | Music Radio Music Award | Best Male Singer-Songwriter (Taiwan/HK) | 《Before the Dawn》 | Won |
