= The Remixes =

The Remixes may refer to:

== Albums ==
- The Remixes (Ari Gold album), 2005
- The Remixes (Britt Nicole album), 2015
- The Remixes (Danii Minogue album), 1999
- The Remixes (Elvis Crespo album), 1999
- The Remixes (Every Little Thing album), 1997
- The Remixes (G.M.S. album), 2003
- The Remixes (Groove Armada album), 2000
- The Remixes (Mariah Carey album), 2003
- The Remixes (Shakira album), 1997
- The Remixes (The Stone Roses album), 2000
- The Remixes (Twice album), 2023
- INXS²: The Remixes, 2004
- The Remixes, 2019 album by Ships in the Night

== EPs ==
- The Remixes (Anna Vissi EP), 2003
- The Remixes (SWV EP), 1994
- The Remixes (White Lies EP), 2010
- The Remixes (My Dear Disco EP), 2010
- The Remixes, by The Number Twelve Looks Like You, 2008
- The Remixes, by Pink, remixing songs from I'm Not Dead, 2007

== See also ==
- Remixes (disambiguation)
- Remix (disambiguation)
