= Remixes (disambiguation) =

A remix is an alternated version of a song.

Remixes may refer to:

- Remixes (Cristian Castro album), 2000
- Remixes (Coldplay EP), 2003
- Remixes (Enrique Iglesias album), 1998
- Remixes (Four Tet album), 2006
- Remixes (Harry and the Potters EP), 2010
- Remixes (Headlights album), 2008
- Remixes (Luis Fonsi album), 2001
- Remixes (Prudence Liew album), 1989
- Remixes (Sebastian album), 2008
- Remixes (Silversun Pickups EP), 2007
- Remixes (Mono Band EP), 2005
- Remixes! (Hellogoodbye EP), a 2008 EP by Hellogoodbye
- Remixes (The Postmarks EP)
- t.A.T.u. Remixes, a remix compilation by pop duo t.A.T.u.
- Remixes (t.A.T.u. album), the second remix compilation by pop duo t.A.T.u.
- Remixes (Basement Jaxx EP), 2004
- Remixes (Phenomenal Handclap Band album), 2010
- Remixes (Shakespears Sister album), 2012

== See also ==
- The Remixes (disambiguation)
- Remix (disambiguation)
