= All 4 U =

All 4 U may refer to:

- "All 4 U", song by Warrant from Belly to Belly
- "All 4 U", song by Jax Jones from Snacks (Supersize)
- "All 4 U", song by Killer Mike from Monster

== See also ==
- All for You (disambiguation)
