= All for You (Show Lo album) =

- All for You 超精選 (3CD+DVD) cover

Greatest hits album All for You 超精選 by Show Lo
- Released: 21 January 2011
- Genre: Mandopop
- Language: Mandarin
- Label: Avex Taiwan

Show Lo chronology
Remix Collection (2010)	All for You (2011)	Only for You (2011)

All for You (Chinese: All for You 超精選) is Taiwanese Mandopop artist Show Lo's second Mandarin greatest hits album. It was released on 21 January 2011 by Avex Taiwan three years after his departure from the label and before his eighth studio album release, Only for You with Gold Typhoon (Taiwan).

The album includes songs from Show's four albums released by Avex Taiwan, from his debut album Show Time in 2003 to Speshow in 2006. It contains 36 tracks plus a medley track, 19 music videos and 60 mins of highlight live footage from BenQ Show Lo Speshow Concert (BenQ 羅志祥Speshow 演唱會 Live 精華版) at Taipei NanGang101 on 30 December 2006, in a 3CD+2DVD format.

The album debuted on Taiwan's G-Music Weekly Top 20 Mandarin Chart at number 11 and Combo Chart at number 12; and at number seven on Five Music Chart at week 4 with a percentage sales of 1.44%, 0.96%, and 2.98% respectively. It peaked at number 9 on Mandarin Chart, at number 12 on Combo Chart and at number 3 on Five Music Chart.

== Track listing ==
CD 1

1. "Show Time"
2. "愛＊轉角" Ai Zhuan Jiao (Love＊Corner) - ending theme of Corner With Love
3. "狐狸精" Hu Li Jing (Seductress)
4. "敢不敢" Gan Bu Gan (Do You Dare?)
5. "幸福獵人" Xing Fu Lie Ren (Happiness Hunter)
6. "幾分" Ji Fen (How Many Points) - insert song of Corner With Love
7. "你是誰" Ni Shi Shei (Who Are You?)
8. "這一秒我哭了" Zhe Yi Miao Wo Ku Le (In This Second I Cried)
9. "妳說妳的我說我的" Ni Shuo Ni De Wo Shuo Wo De (You Said It's Yours I say It's Mine)
10. "沒有妳" Mei You Ni (Without You)
11. "漫無目的" Man Wu Mu De (Aimless)
12. "一無所有" Yi Wu Suo You (Nothing To My Name)
13. "All for you精華組曲" (好朋友+愛*轉角+戀愛達人+真命天子+精舞門) (All for You Medley:Good Friends+Love＊Corner+Love Expert+Destined Guy+Dance Gate)

CD 2

1. "戀愛達人" Lian Ai Da Ren (Love Expert) - feat Dee Shu
2. "精舞門" Jing Wu Men (Dance Gate)
3. "小丑魚" Xiao Chou Yu (Clown Fish)
4. "機器娃娃" Ji Qi Wa Wa (Robotic Doll)
5. "瞎攪和" Xia Jiao He (Blindly Mixed)
6. "咕嚕雞" Gu Lu Ji (Sweet and Sour Chicken)
7. "灰色空間" Hui Se Kong Jian (Grey Dimension) - ending theme of Outsiders II
8. "Magic Show"
9. "剌青" Ci Qing (Tattoo) - composed by Show Lo
10. "給你管" Gei Ni Guan (Serves You Right) - composed by Show Lo
11. "自戀" Zi Lian (Narcissism) - composed by Show Lo
12. "國王遊戲" Guo Wang You Xi (King's Game) - feat Simon Webbe

CD 3

1. "自我催眠" Zi Wo Cui Mian (Self-Hypnosis) - composed by Jay Chou
2. "嗆司嗆司" Qiang Si Qiang Si (Chance Chance)
3. "好朋友" Hao Peng You (Good Friends)
4. "真命天子" Zhen Ming Tian Zi (Destined Guy) - feat. Jolin Tsai
5. "力量" Li Liang (Strength)
6. "猛男日記" Meng Nan Ri Ji (Diary of a Muscle Man)
7. "不懂我的心" Bu Dong Wo De Xin (Don't Understand My Heart)
8. "火警119" Huo Jing 119 (Emergency 119)
9. "淘汰郎" Tao Tai Lang (Eliminated Man)
10. "黑眼圈" Hei Yan Quan (Dark Eye Circles)
11. "透視" Tou Shi (X-Ray Vision)
12. "碎碎念" Sui Sui Nian (Nagging)

== DVD listing ==
DVD 1

1. "Show Time" MV
2. "敢不敢" (Do You Dare?) MV
3. "沒有妳" (Without You) MV
4. "狐狸精" (Seductress) MV
5. "你是誰" (Who Are You?) MV
6. "這一秒我哭了" (In This Second I Cried) MV
7. "機器娃娃" (Robotic Doll) MV
8. "戀愛達人" (Love Expert) MV - feat Dee Shu
9. "小丑魚" (Clown Fish) MV - feat Rainie Yang
10. "瞎攪和" (Blindly Mixed) MV
11. "真命天子" (Destined Guy) MV - feat. Jolin Tsai
12. "淘汰郎" (Eliminated Man) MV
13. "自我催眠" (Self-Hypnosis) MV - feat Barbie Shu
14. "嗆司嗆司" (Chance Chance) MV - cameo by Luo Ma Ma
15. "力量" (Strength) MV

DVD 2

1. "精舞門" (Dance Gate) MV
2. "幸福獵人" (Happiness Hunter) MV
3. "好朋友" (Good Friends) MV - feat Ariel Lin
4. "國王遊戲" (King's Game) MV
5. BenQ Show Lo Speshow Concert highlight live footage at Taipei NanGang101 on 30 December 2006
