= Lion Roar =

- CD+DVD cover

Studio album by Show Lo
- Released: November 8, 2013
- Recorded: 2013
- Genre: Pop; dance-pop; R&B
- Length: 42:40
- Language: Mandarin
- Label: Sony Music Entertainment (Taiwan)

Show Lo chronology
Over The Limit (2012)	Lion Roar (2013)	Reality Show? (2015)

Alternative cover
- Japanese CD+DVD cover

Lion Roar (Chinese: 獅子吼) is the tenth Mandarin studio album by Taiwanese singer Show Lo. It was released on November 8, 2013, by Sony Music Entertainment (Taiwan), which was also his first studio album released by the company after he joined in August 2013. The Japanese edition of the album was released on March 12, 2014.

Lion Roar was a commercial success upon its release in Taiwan, becoming the best-selling album of the year. It was his fourth consecutive number-one best-selling album of the year in Taiwan since Rashomon (2010).

== Background and release ==
The album was available for pre-order from October 16, 2013. On December 6, 2013, Lion Roar – Dance Soul Returns Encore Edition (獅子吼 之 舞魂再現 冠軍Encore版) was released, featuring three new tracks, and three remix tracks from Lion Roar.

== Music videos ==
Five music videos were produced for the album, including "Fantasy", "Unfinished Promises", "You Are Mine", "Dance Soul Returns", and "My Queen".

== Track listing ==
Lion Roar – Standard edition
No.	Title	Lyrics	Music	Translation	Length
1.	"愛投羅網" (Ài Tóu Luó Wǎng)	Li Tsung En; NELLA (Rap)	Drew Ryan Scott, Joacim Persson, Niclas Molinder, Johan Alkenäs	Fantasy	4:53
2.	"愛 騙我" (Ài Piàn Wǒ)	Show Lo	Show Lo	Love Liar	4:09
3.	"未完的承諾" (Wèi Wán De Chéng Nuò)	Hsu Shih Chen, Wu Hui Fu	Chung Seok Won, Park Eun Joo	Unfinished Promises	3:47
4.	"惜命命" (Siu Mia Mia)	Show Lo	Show Lo	You Are Mine	3:40
5.	"獅子吼" (Shī Zǐ Hǒu)	Lo Ming Sung	Show Lo	Lion Roars	4:35
6.	"第61分鐘" (Dì Liù Shí Yī Fēn Zhōng)	Ko Ta Wei	Michael Jay, Edvin Danelian, Allan Eshuijs	The 61st Minute	3:56
7.	"愛我喊出來" (Ài Wǒ Hăn Chū Lái)	Ko Ta Wei	Chang Chien Wei	Shout Out For Love	3:31
8.	"愛慘了" (Ài Cǎn Le)	Hsu Shih Chen, Wu Hui Fu	Hermanni Kovalainen, Aatu Mällinen, Kiyohito Komatsu	Deep Love	4:07
9.	"想逃" (Xiǎng Táo)	Wu Yi Wei, Wonderful	Tan Vui Chuan	Run Away	4:21
10.	"如果還有如果" (Rú Guŏ Hái Yǒu Rú Guǒ)	Show Lo	Show Lo	If There's Still an If	5:14
Total length:					42:40

Lion Roar – DVD
No.	Title	Lyrics	Music	Length
1.	"I Can Fly"	Show Lo	Show Lo	3:08

Lion Roar – Dance Soul Returns Encore Edition Bonus CD
No.	Title	Lyrics	Music	Translation	Length
1.	"舞魂再現" (Wǔ Hún Zài Xiàn)	Wu Yi Wei	Daniel Caesar, Ludwig Lindell, Olof Lindskog	Dance Soul Returns	3:01
2.	"我的皇后" (Wǒ De Huáng Hòu)	Hsu Shih Chen, Wu Hui Fu	Tu Chih Wen	My Queen	3:32
3.	"佔愛為王" (Zhàn Ài Wéi Wáng)	Wu Yi Wei	Joachim Hejslet Jørgensen, Linda Andrews, Sam Gray	Love Is King	3:43
4.	"愛投羅網-Remix" (Ài Tóu Luó Wǎng (Remix))	Li Tsung En; Nella (Rap)	Drew Ryan Scott, Joacim Persson, Niclas Molinder, Johan Alkenäs	Fantasy (Remix)	4:35
5.	"愛我喊出來-Remix" (Ài Wǒ Hăn Chū Lái (Remix))	Ko Ta Wei	Chang Chien Wei	Shout Out For Love (Remix)	3:36
6.	"第61分鐘-Remix" (Dì Liù Shí Yī Fēn Zhōng (Remix))	Ko Ta Wei	Michael Jay, Edvin Danelian, Allan Eshuijs	The 61st Minute (Remix)	5:07

== Charts ==
=== Weekly charts ===
Chart (2013)	Peak position
Taiwanese Albums (G-Music)	1

=== Year-end charts ===
Chart (2013)	Position
Taiwanese Albums (Note: Best-selling albums of the year in Taiwan as reported by media outlets)	1

== Sales and certifications ==
Region	Certification	Certified units/sales
Taiwan	—	120,000
