= Only for You (Show Lo album) =

- CD-only cover

Studio album by Show Lo
- Released: February 18, 2011
- Recorded: 2010–2011
- Genre: Dance-pop; R&B
- Length: 49:29
- Language: Mandarin
- Label: Gold Typhoon (Taiwan); Pony Canyon (Japan)

Show Lo chronology
All for You (2011)	Only for You (2011)	9ood Show (2012)

Alternative cover
- 10001st Night Celebration cover

Only for You (Chinese: 獨一無二; pinyin: Dú yī wú èr) is the eighth Mandarin studio album by Taiwanese singer Show Lo. It was released on February 18, 2011, by Gold Typhoon (Taiwan). The Japanese edition of the album was released on July 20, 2011. It spawned the singles "What Am I Fighting For?" and "Only for You".

The album was a commercial success in Taiwan, where it became the country's best-selling album of 2011 with 150,000 copies sold. In Japan, the album peaked at number 34 on the Oricon Albums Chart.

== Background and release ==
The album was available for preorder from January 28, 2011, in two limited editions, of 30,000 copies each with serial numbers and photobook: Only For You (Gentry Love Edition) and Only For You (Flower World Edition). For the first time the first lead track is a ballad "What Am I Fighting For?".

A further two editions were released by Gold Typhoon: Only for You (10001st Night Celebration Edition) (2CD) on March 18, 2011, with two new tracks and Only for You (MV Collectable Edition) (CD+DVD) on May 6, 2011, with nine music videos and photobook. The Japanese edition, Only for You (Japanese Edition) was released on July 20, 2011, by Pony Canyon, which included a special bonus track of the Japanese version of title track "Only You" and a DVD with 10 music videos.

== Promotion ==
The album was marketed with the "What Am I Fighting For" track, which was rather unconventional, as he often markets an album through a dance piece. The music video for the second lead track "Only You" was released nine days later. The video consists of dance piece choreographed by Shaun Evaristo. It was reported to have costed NT$5 million to create European scenery and to debut the "Anti-Gravity filming technique".

== Commercial performance ==
The album debuted at number one on Taiwan's G-Music Top 20 Weekly Mandarin and Combo Charts, and Five Music Chart at week 8 (February 18 to 24, 2011) with a percentage sales of 74.6%, 48.43% and 78.8% respectively. Suppressing fellow artist Jolin Tsai's record at G-Music Mandarin Chart of 68.11% for Butterfly in 2009 and became the highest debut week percentage sales in the chart's seven-year history. As of March 3, 2011, the album has sold 103,628 copies.

The tracks, "Only You" and "What Am I Fighting For" are listed on the Top 20 Gold Songs of the (January to June) 2011 Global Chinese Golden Chart. The album is the best selling album in Taiwan in 2011, with 150,000 copies sold.

== Track listing ==
Only for You – Standard edition
No.	Title	Lyrics	Music	Translation	Length
1.	"獨一無二" (Dú Yī Wú Èr)	Chen Zhenchuan (陳鎮川)	E. Kidd Bogart, Fraser T Smith, Andrew Wansel, Chen Xinan	Only You	3:48
2.	"美麗的誤會" (Měilì de Wùhuì)	Li Zongen (李宗恩)	Jo, Hyun Chul, Lin Yu Xian	Beautiful Mistake	3:26
3.	"拼什麼" (Pīn Shénme)	Yao Ruo Long (姚若龍)	Xu Jizong, Hong Jingyao	Hero In Vain	5:10
4.	"Touch My Heart"	Li Zongen (李宗恩)	Banana Boat, Jirud Pakinpanichkul, Cai Tinggui		3:21
5.	"舞所遁形" (Wǔ Suǒ Dùn Xíng)	Chen Zhenchuan (陳鎮川)	Sam McCarthy, Ankelius, Martin Olof Ohrwall, Esbjorn Johan, Chen Xinan	Nowhere to Hide	3:11
6.	"怕安静" (Pà Ānjìng)	Ma Songwei (馬嵩惟)	Liu Yonghui, Yu Jing Yan	Silence Phobia	4:26
7.	"強出頭" (Qiáng Chūtóu)	Ge Da Wei (葛大為)	Kim Seok Jin, Zhou Guo Yi	Brave Death	4:04
8.	"忍住" (Rěn Zhù)	Wu Yi Wei (吳易緯)	Jo Hyun Chul, Ti Yi En	Pains Swallowed	4:03
9.	"口頭纏" (Kǒutóu Chán)	Ge Da Wei (葛大為)	Kim Beom Ju, Cai Tinggui	MagicWords	4:25
10.	"愛享瘦" (Ài Xiǎng Shòu)	Lin Wei Li (林尉利)	Li Zhi Qing, C. Jae Y	Let Love Show	3:37
11.	"拼什麼" (Pīn Shénme) (Single Show Concert Version)	Yao Ruo Long (姚若龍)	Xu Jizong, Hong Jingyao	Hero In Vain (Only For Fans Version)	1:15
Total length:					40:46

Only for You – 10001st Night Celebration Edition
No.	Title	Lyrics	Music	Translation	Length
1.	"一萬零一夜" (Yī Wàn Líng Yī Yè)	Wu Yi Wei (吳易緯)	Chen Xinan	10001st Night	4:16
2.	"陪你到最後" (Péi Nǐ Dào Zuìhòu)	Show Lo (羅志祥)	Liu Yonghui	With you Till the End	4:18
Total length:					8:34

== Charts ==
=== Weekly charts ===
Chart (2011)	Peak position
Japanese Albums (Oricon)	34
Taiwanese Albums (G-Music)	3

=== Year-end charts ===
Chart (2011)	Position
Taiwanese Albums (Note: Best-selling albums of the year in Taiwan as reported by media outlets)	1
