= Hot Shot (TV series) =

- Promotion poster
- Also known as: 籃球火; Lan Qiu Huo; Basketball Fire
- Genre: Sport, Comedy
- Directed by: Lin He Long (林合隆)
- Starring: Jerry Yan; Show Lo; Wu Chun
- Opening theme: "箇中強手" (Best of the Bunch – Hot Shot) by Show Lo
- Ending theme: "一半" Yi Ban by Jerry Yan
- Country of origin: Taiwan
- Original language: Mandarin
- No. of episodes: 16

Production
- Executive producer: Fung Jia Rei
- Running time: 90 mins (Sundays at 22:00 to 23:30)
- Production company: Comic Ritz International Production

Original release
- Network: China Television (CTV)
- Release: 27 July – 9 November 2008

Related
- Rolling Love (翻滾吧！蛋炒飯); Love or Bread (我的億萬麵包)

Hot Shot (Chinese: 籃球火; pinyin: Lan Qiu Huo; lit. 'Basketball Fire') is a Taiwanese drama starring Jerry Yan of F4, Show Lo, and Wu Chun of Fahrenheit. It was produced by Comic International Productions (可米國際影視事業股份有限公司) and directed by Lin He Long (林合隆).

It was first broadcast in Taiwan on free-to-air China Television (CTV) (中視) from 27 July 2008 to 9 November 2008, on Sundays at 22:00 to 23:30 and cable TV Gala Television (GTV) Variety Show/CH 28 (八大綜合台) on 2 August 2008 to 15 November 2008, every Saturday at 21:30 to 23:00. This show was also broadcast in Hong Kong, China, Japan, South Korea, Vietnam, Indonesia and the Philippines.

== Synopsis ==
In a school where academic reigns supreme and sports were relegated to a dusty corner of the campus, Li Ying vowed to revive the basketball team by volunteering to be the coach of the basketball team. Her first member was Yuan Da Ying, a boy from the countryside who was passionate for basketball but had no skills. Their recruitment went into a high gear when Dong Fang Xiang, a legendary basketball player, transferred to their school.

Around the same time, Yuan Da Ying fell for Zhan Jie Er, a scholarship student who reminds him of his childhood friend Gu Gu Ji. Things were complicated by the fact her family works for Dong Fang Xiang, who she also grew up with. Their encounter may just rewrite the school's basketball history.

== Cast ==
=== Main cast ===
- Jerry Yan (言承旭) as Dong Fang Xiang 東方翔
- Show Lo (羅志祥) as Yuan Da Ying 元大鷹
- Wu Chun (吳尊) as Wu Ji Zun 無極尊
- Tracy Chou (周采詩) as Zhan Jie Er 湛潔兒/ Qiu Kui 球魁
- Coco Jiang (蔣怡) as Li Ying 李贏
- Zhang Yan Ming (張雁名) Du Fei 杜飛

=== Supporting cast ===
- George Hu (胡宇崴) as Wu Ji Wei 無極威
- Ku Pao-ming as Li Zi Ping 李子平
- Michael Zhang as Can 殘 / Ah Fu 阿福
- Lin Bo Yan (林伯彥) as Qi Xiao Yun 齊嘯雲
- Lin Qi Tai (林祺泰) as Qi Xiao Yu 齊嘯雨
- Coco Chiang as Li Ying

=== Extended Cast ===
- Zhao Shu Hai as Dong Fang Xu 東方旭
- Yun Zhong Yue as Lao Lu 老路
- Wang Xia (王俠) as Dong Fang Shou 東方朔
- Ma Zhi Qin (馬之秦) as Tie Lan 鐵蘭
- Wang Wei Ting (黃薇渟) as Lin Zi Xuan 林紫璇
- Wang Jian Min as Ji Wang 紀網
- Jiang Wei Wen (蔣偉文) as George
- Xie Kun Da as Wang Jing 王竟
- Han Run Zhong (韓潤中) as Li Ke 李克
- Cai Ming Xun (蔡明勳) as Wen Huai Wen 溫懷文
- Xu Jun Hao (許君豪) as Wang Gui 王貴
- Gong Ji An as Sun Hao 孫浩
- Lan Jun Tian (藍鈞天) as Jian Deng 賈登
- Bu Xue Liang as Tang Long 唐龍
- Guo Yan Jun as Ru Zhu 魯竹
- Li Jia Hua (李佳驊) as Ge Li Ya 戈利亞

=== Cameo Roles ===
- Yan Jia Le (顏嘉樂) as Flower store owner
- Jian Han Zhong (簡翰忠) as Commentator
- Qian Ding Yuan (錢定遠) as Commentator
- Lee Hsing-wen (李興文) as Coach of He Yi
- Na Wei Xun as Wang Ye 王爺
- Li Guo Chao (李國超) as Coach of Xin Rui
- Renzo Liu as Coach of Xiang Yang
- Billy as Wang Ji Xiu
- Lu Jian Yu as Gangster
- Wu Jian Hao as one of Yuan Da Ying's fans
- Wang Chuan Yi as one of Dong Fang Xiang's fans

== Soundtrack ==
Hot Shot

Soundtrack album by Nese, Freya Lim, Adrian Fu
- Released: 11 August 2008
- Genre: Mandopop
- Language: Mandarin
- Label: Sony Music Entertainment (Taiwan)

Hot Shot Code Original Soundtrack (CD+DVD) (籃球火音樂聖典) was released on 11 August 2008 by Freya Lim, Nese, and Adrian Fu under Sony Music Entertainment (Taiwan). It contains ten songs, in which five songs are various instrumental versions of the five original songs. The album also includes a DVD.

=== Track listing ===
No.	Title	Singer(s)	Length
1.	"U got me" (絕對無敵)	Nese
2.	"The crowd was rockin'" (霹靂決鬥 inst.)
3.	"Superman"	Nese
4.	"Tunnel" (隧道)	Freya Lim
5.	"U got me – Hypertension" (絕對無敵之 箭在弦上 inst.)
6.	"I'll Be Fine" (真的, 我沒事)	Adrian Fu
7.	"Don't Tell Me" (不要對我再說愛)	Freya Lim
8.	"Tunnel – End of the Rainbow" (甘草豬頭 inst.)
9.	"I'll be fine – Dawn" (隧道之 彩虹盡頭 inst.)
10.	"U got me – Hoop dreams" (絕對無敵之 inst.)

DVD
No.	Title	Length
1.	"TV Drama Behind-the-Scenes Footages" (30 mins.)

In addition, there are three songs not included in the original soundtracks: The opening theme song, which is "箇中強手" or "Best of the Bunch – Hot Shot", and an insert song, "幸福不滅" or "Cause I Believe" by Show Lo from his Trendy Man album, and the ending theme song by Jerry Yan entitled "Yi Ban", released in his Freedom album.

== Books ==
- Hot Shot Notebook / 籃球火的青春記事簿 – ISBN 978-986-173-403-3
- Hot Shot TV Drama Novel / 籃球火電視小說 – ISBN 978-986-174-797-2
- Hot Shot Making of Photo Book (Normal Edition) / 籃球火幕後寫真書（平裝版）- ISBN 978-986-174-766-8
- Hot Shot Making of Photo Book (Deluxe Limited Edition) / 籃球火幕後寫真書（精裝限量版）- ISBN 978-986-174-798-9

== Awards ==
Year	Ceremony	Category	Result
2009	44th Golden Bell Awards	Best Actor – Show Lo	Nominated
