= Baby Steps =

Baby Steps may refer to:

- "Baby Steps" (Arthur), a 2012 television episode
- "Baby Steps" (Modern Family), a 2020 television episode
- Baby Steps (video game), a 2025 video game
- Baby Steps (manga), a 2014–2015 manga series by Hikaru Katsuki
- "Baby Steps" (Olivia Dean song), 2026
- "Baby Steps", a 2026 song by Rachel Chinouriri from I Think I Spoke Too Soon
- "Baby Steps", a 2019 song by Esthero
