= Contemplate (The Reason You Exist) =

2003 studio album by Kai Tracid

Studio album by Kai Tracid
- Released: 24 February 2003
- Genre: Trance, Acid
- Label: Sony Dance Division
- Producer: Kai Franz

Kai Tracid chronology
Trance & Acid (2002)	Contemplate (The Reason You Exist) (2003)

Contemplate (The Reason You Exist) is Kai Tracid's third artist album, released on 24 February 2003.

== Track listing ==
No.	Title	Length
1.	"Welcome"	1:23
2.	"Express Your Hidden Passion"	6:57
3.	"Follow Me Freely"	6:12
4.	"4 Just 1 Day"	8:02
5.	"Far Beyond Your Wildest Imagination"	5:42
6.	"Drift Deep Into Your Own Thoughts"	8:00
7.	"I Don't Want To Live 4 Ever"	6:15
8.	"Pure Acid"	8:10
9.	"Running Through Your Veins"	5:25
10.	"Contemplate The Reason You Exist"	3:29
