= Before the Dawn (Shin album) =

Before The Dawn

Studio album by Shin
- Released: 22 July 2011
- Genre: Rock

Shin chronology
趁我 (2009)	Before The Dawn (2011)	I Remember (2012)

Before The Dawn (黎明之前) is the fourth studio album by Taiwanese rock singer Shin. The album was released on 22 July 2011. It is divided into two versions: Night version and Dawn version.

== Track listing ==
All tracks are written by Shin.

CD
No.	Title	Length
1.	"淪陷 (Falling)"	3:36
2.	"假裝陽光的蠟燭 (The Candles Pretends to be the Sun)"	3:41
3.	"黎明之前 (Before the Dawn)"	4:22
4.	"頑強 (Obstinate)"	2:53
5.	"三秒 (3 seconds)"	3:13
6.	"再見 (Farewell)"	3:33
7.	"浪子 (The unrestraint bloke)"	4:39
8.	"遠得要命的愛情 (Love of the far far away)"	4:21
9.	"桃花開 搖搖擺擺 (The blooming of the peach blossom, sawing in the air)"	4:57
10.	"莎呦哪啦 (Sayo-na-na)"	5:30
11.	"降龍樂章" (only in Dawn version)	3:20
12.	"莎呦哪啦 [Full Band Version] (Sayo-na-na (Full Band Version) )" (only in Dawn version)	5:13

DVD ( Live in 河岸 (Night version Disc2) )
No.	Title	Length
1.	"趁我"
2.	"瘋狂"
3.	"小時候"
4.	"無聲的所在 (Wu Bai cover)"
5.	"靠背"
6.	"火燒的寂寞"
7.	"態度"
8.	"不會消失的夜晚"

Dawn version Disc2
No.	Title	Length
1.	"黎明之前 (Before the Dawn) [MV]"
2.	"黎明之前 [MV Behind the Scene Footage]"
