= The Remix Album =

The Remix Album may refer to:

- The Remix Album (4hero album), 2004
- The Remix Album (All Saints album), 1998
- The Remix Album (Champion album), 2006
- The Remix Album (Lisa Stansfield album), 1998
- The Remix Album (Milli Vanilli album), 1990
- The Remix Album (Prince Ital Joe album), 1995
- The Remix Album (Vengaboys album), 2000
- The Remix Album...Diamonds Are Forever, by Shirley Bassey, 2000
- The Remix Album, by Cascada, 2006
- The Remix Album, by Sandy & Papo, 1998

== See also ==
- Remix album
