= Show Time (Show Lo album) =

- Show Time (CD) cover

Studio album by Show Lo
- Released: 5 December 2003
- Genre: Mandopop, Taiwanese hip hop
- Length: 48:07
- Language: Mandarin
- Label: Avex Taiwan
- Producer: Di Zi, Bi Guoyong, Guo Jianliang

Show Lo chronology
Show Time (2003)	Expert Show (2004)

Alternative cover

Show Time is Taiwanese Mandopop artist Show Lo's debut Mandarin solo studio album. It was released on 5 December 2003 by Avex Taiwan. The album sold 50,000 copies within two weeks of release. Avex Taiwan announced at the album's celebration party, on 12 January 2004, that over 80,000 copies were sold leading to a celebration version to be published, which included Show's directorial debut of a 30-minute music drama.

The highest chart position the album achieved was five. The track "Show Time" won one of the Top 10 Gold Songs at the Hong Kong TVB8 Awards, presented by television station TVB8, in 2004.

== Album ==
The album is of the Japanese hip hop style with artwork and MV shot on the streets of Tokyo, Japan. Avex Tawan enlisted the help of Golden Melody Award winner and songwriter Di Zi (Chinese: 阿弟仔), Bi Guoyong (Chinese: 畢國勇) and Guo Jianliang (Chinese: 郭建良) to produce an album that appeals to young people.

"Show Time", the title track is a high tempo J-hip hop number with rap lyrics in Chinese and Japanese, written by Show, and choreographed by his childhood friend Tommy (Chinese: 大目) of Dance Soul studios. The other lead tracks, "敢不敢" (Do You Dare?) is a mid-tempo ballad and "狐狸精" (Seductress) is a high tempo 'battle-of-the-sexes' track. "漫無目的" (Aimless) is a mid-tempo dance track choreographed by Sam (丸山正溫) of Japanese pop group TRF fame. The track "妳說妳的我說我的" (You Said It's Yours I say It's Mine) is the ending theme song of Taiwanese drama Hi! Working Girl (Hi! 上班女郎) starring Show and Jolin Tsai.

In order for Show Time to be released in Mainland China, Show had to re-record and rename some tracks, as they were considered offensive by the Government's audit controls. For example, "狐狸精" (Seductress) was re-titled to "討厭鬼" (Annoying One), and part of the lyrics for "沒有妳" (Without You) were changed to the Japanese rap lyrics for "Show Time" into Chinese.

== Track listing ==
#	Original Title	Pinyin	English	Length
1.	'"Show Time"			3:34
2.	"漫無目的"	Man Wu Mu De	Aimless	3:07
3.	"沒有妳"	Mei You Ni	Without You	4:26
4.	"敢不敢"	Gan Bu Gan	Do You Dare?	3:44
5.	"狐狸精"	Hu Li Jing	Seductress	4:27
6.	"你是誰"	Ni Shi Shei	Who Are You?	4:44
7.	"一無所有"	Yi Wu Suo You	Nothing To My Name	4:39
8.	"這一秒我哭了"	Zhe Yi Miao Wo Ku Le	In This Second I Cried	4:00
9.	"紅線"	Hong Xian	Red Line	3:45
10.	"攤牌"	Tan Pai	Reveal One's Hand	3:53
11.	"痞子紳士"	Pi Zi Shen Shi	Ruffian Gentleman	4:09
12.	"妳說妳的我說我的"	Ni Shuo Ni De Wo Shuo Wo De	You Said It's Yours I say It's Mine	3:37

== Music videos ==
- "Show Time"
- "狐狸精" (Seductress)
- "敢不敢" (Do You Dare?)
- "沒有妳" (Without You) - feat Terri Kwan & Jerry Huang (黃志瑋) from Show Lo Music Love Story
- "你是誰"
- "這一秒我哭了" (In This Second I Cried) - feat Terri Kwan Jerry Huang from Show Lo Music Love Story + karaoke version with footage from autograph/promotional events and behind-the-scene clips

== Releases ==
Two editions were released by Avex Taiwan:

- 5 December 2003 - Show Time (CD)
- 9 January 2004 - Show Time (Japanese Hip Hop No.1 Celebration Version) (日式嘻哈NO.1慶功版) (CD+VCD) - includes VCD with 3 MV's and a 30 min music drama:
1. "Show Time" MV
2. "狐狸精" (Seductress) MV
3. "敢不敢" (Do You Dare?) MV
4. Show Lo Music Love Story (羅志祥的音樂愛情故事): written and directed by Show, starring Terri Kwan, Jerry Huang and cameo by Show. It is a 30-minute music drama featuring songs from Show Time. It was broadcast on Azio TV (東風衛視) from 24–26 December 2003.
