= Life's Too Short (Disney song) =

Song by Kristen Bell, Idina Menzel

from the album Frozen (Original Motion Picture Soundtrack - Deluxe Edition)
- Language: English
- Released: November 25, 2013
- Length: 3:55
- Producers: Robert Joseph Lopez, Kristen Anderson-Lopez

"Life's Too Short" is a song written for the 2013 animated Disney film Frozen. While it was deleted from the film as the relationship between Elsa and Anna changed, it has become a cult favorite.

The song begins with the initial confrontation between Anna and Elsa, where Anna tries to persuade Elsa to return home and hide her power.

There have been two versions of this song shown to the public: one which is an energetic showtune (recorded as a demo) and the other a slower ballad (created as an animatic). There was also a reprise written when Elsa and Anna are locked up.

The footage of the deleted scene was shown at an open lecture at the Beijing Film Academy.

The song's place in the show would eventually evolve into "For the First Time in Forever Reprise, and by "I Can't Lose You" in the stage musical adaption.

== Critical reception ==
Hypable wrote: "“Life’s Too Short” is undeniably catchy, but the song is charged with anger and resentment which are conveyed quite differently in the final cut of Frozen." Rotoscopers felt the song was "sassier" than the final song, writing that the song has "a more real sister dynamic, while each sister is trying to push their own agenda and desires". The Mary Sue notes that the song would have "messed with the pacing of the film", and that it mentions a "prophecy" concept that was cut from the final film. Bandwagon thought it was "fantastic".
