= Dante (song) =

- Single cover

Single by Show Lo
- Language: Japanese
- B-side: "Hero"
- Released: February 15, 2012
- Recorded: 2011–2012
- Genre: J-pop
- Length: 16:08
- Label: Pony Canyon (Japan); Gold Typhoon (Taiwan)

Show Lo singles chronology
| "Dante" (2012) | "Magic" (2012) |

"Dante" (Chinese: 但丁; pinyin: Dàn dīng) is the first Japanese single by Taiwanese singer Show Lo. It was released on February 15, 2012, in Japan by Pony Canyon, and on March 2, 2012, in Taiwan by Gold Typhoon (Taiwan).

== Commercial performance ==
"Dante" peaked at number ten on the Oricon Singles Chart in Japan, and sold a total of 7,395 copies.

== Track listing ==
| No. | Title | Lyrics | Music | Length |
|---|---|---|---|---|
| 1. | "Dante" | Kanata Okajima | Jeff Miyahara, Adam "AK" Kapit | 3:49 |
| 2. | "Hero" | Kanata Okajima | Jeff Miyahara | 4:18 |
| 3. | "Dante" (Instrumental) | | Jeff Miyahara, Adam "AK" Kapit | 3:48 |
| 4. | "Hero" (Instrumental) | | Jeff Miyahara | 4:16 |
| Total length: | | | | 16:08 |

== Charts ==
| Chart (2012) | Peak position |
|---|---|
| Japan Singles (Oricon) | 10 |
