= Reality Show? =

2015 studio album by Show Lo

- Regular edition cover

Studio album by Show Lo
- Released: November 20, 2015
- Recorded: 2015
- Genre: Pop; dance
- Language: Mandarin; English
- Label: EMI Taiwan
- Producer: Tian Di He Entertainment Co., Ltd.

Show Lo chronology
極限拼圖Live Tour DVD (2014)	Reality Show? (2015)	No Idea (2019)

Reality Show? (Chinese: 真人秀？; pinyin: Zhēn rén xiù?) is the eleventh Mandarin studio album by Taiwanese recording artist Show Lo. It was released on November 20, 2015, by EMI Taiwan. On December 18, 2015, the Show Plus edition (Show Plus 真人秀？加場版) was released, featuring two new tracks.

== Songs ==
On the Hit FM Top 100 Singles of the Year chart for 2015, "Let Go" ranked at number six, "Come Back Baby" ranked at number 33, and "Together in Love" ranked at number 58.

== Music videos ==
Release date	Song title	English
July 20, 2014	從愛發落	Deal With Your Love
July 20, 2014	再見陌生人	Goodbye My Love
October 26, 2015	夠了	Let Go
November 15, 2015	致命傷	Come Back Baby
November 24, 2015	幸福特調	Together In Love
December 8, 2015	說真話的朋友	Best Friend
December 23, 2015	斷片	I Lost Myself
January 12, 2016	愛的主打嗝	Happy Hiccup
February 2, 2016	北極星	Pole Star

== Track listing ==
No.	Title	Lyrics	Music	English	Length
1.	"夠了" (Gòu Le)	Show Lo; Jia He (佳和)	Show Lo; Starr Chen (陳星翰)	Let Go (feat Starr Chen)	3:44
2.	"無聲的失控" (Wú Shēng De Shī Kòng)	Luke Tsui (崔惟楷)	Starr Chen (陳星翰)	Silent Runaway	3:37
3.	"致命傷" (Zhì Mìng Shāng)	Wu I-Wei (吳易緯)	Moon Du (都智文)	Come Back Baby	4:35
4.	"幸福特調" (Xing Fú Tè Diào)	Jennifer Xu (徐世珍)	Martin Mulholland, Eirik Johansen, Jan Hallvard Larsen	Together In Love (feat Suzy)	3:45
5.	"說真話的朋友" (Shuō Zhēn Huà De Péng Yǒu)	Al Kuan (管啟源)	Ricky Hsiao (蕭煌奇)	Best Friend	4:24
6.	"從愛發落" (Cóng Ài Fā Luò)	Wu I-Wei (吳易緯)	Moon Du (都智文)	Deal With Your Love	3:07
7.	"Bad Girl"	Wu I-Wei (吳易緯)	Claire Rodrigues Lee, Fridolin Walcher, Christoph Bauss, Ricky Hanley	Bad Girl	3:42
8.	"欠你的吧" (Qiàn Nǐ De Ba)	Matthew Yan (嚴云農)	Moon Du (都智文)	Crazy For You	3:50
9.	"誰" (Shuí)	Show Lo; Starr Chen (陳星翰)	Show Lo; Starr Chen (陳星翰)	I Need An Excuse To Forget You	3:50
10.	"再見陌生人" (Zài Jiàn Mò Shēng Rén)	Double Chen (淺紫)	Moon Du (都智文)	Goodbye My Love	3:53
11.	"大開眼界" (Dà Kāi Yǎn Jiè)	Chen Tian You (陳天佑)	Matthew Tishler, Vincent DeGiorgio, Thomas Johnsson	Open Your Eyes	3:28
12.	"北極星" (Běi Jí Xīng)	Al Kuan (管啟源); H.U.B	Ryosuke Imai (今井了介)	Pole Star (feat May J.)	5:11

SHOW Plus Edition
No.	Title	Lyrics	Music	English	Length
1.	"斷片" (Duàn Piàn)	Chen Zhen Chuan (陳鎮川)	Chris Meyer, Eirik Johansen, Jan Hallvard Larsen	I Lost Myself	4:22
2.	"愛的主打嗝" (Ài De Zhǔ Dǎ Gé)	Wu I-Wei (吳易緯)	Moon Du (都智文)	Happy Hiccup	3:20
