= Good Show =

- Regular edition cover

Studio album by Show Lo
- Released: April 6, 2012
- Recorded: 2011–2012
- Genre: Pop; dance-pop; R&B
- Length: 40:46
- Language: Mandarin
- Label: Gold Typhoon (Taiwan)

Show Lo chronology
Only for You (2011)	Good Show (2012)	Over The Limit (2012)

Alternative cover
- Love Show edition cover

Good Show, stylized as 9ood Show, (Chinese: 有我在; pinyin: Yǒu wǒ zài) is the ninth Mandarin studio album by Taiwanese singer Show Lo. It was released on April 6, 2012, by Gold Typhoon (Taiwan). The album was available for pre-order from March 21, 2012. The Japanese edition was released on June 20, 2012.

Good Show was a commercial success in Taiwan, becoming the best-selling album in the country during 2012 with sales of 135,000 copies. In Japan, it peaked at number 58 on the Oricon Albums Chart.

== Background and release ==
The Japanese edition of the album, titled Count on Me (有我在 (日本盤)), was released on June 20, 2012, by Pony Canyon, which included a DVD with 6 music videos.

== Track listing ==
Good Show – Standard edition
No.	Title	Lyrics	Music	Translation	Length
1.	"有我在" (Yǒu Wǒ Zài)	Luke"skywalker"Tsui (崔惟楷)	Scott Wild (aka. The White N3rd), Paul Humphries	Count on Me	5:12
2.	"全城熱愛" (Quán Chéng Rè Ài)	Chen Tianyou (陳天佑)	Tang Da (唐達)	Feel The Love	4:00
3.	"王見王 feat.杨丞琳" (Wáng Jiàn Wáng feat. Rainie Yang)	Xu Shizhen (徐世珍)	Lara Nahum, Michael Grant	When The King Meets The Queen (Ft. Rainie Yang)	3:38
4.	"不具名的悲傷" (Bù Jù Míng De Bēi Shāng)	Guan Qiyuan (管啟源)	Lin Qi Yu (林倛玉)	Anonymous Sadness	5:02
5.	"愛入非非" (Ài Rù Fēi Fēi)	Chen Tianyou (陳天佑)	Lee Hua Chang (李華章）	Love In Fantasy	4:53
6.	"幸福囉" (Xìng Fú Luo)	Wu Yiwei (吳易緯 (生命樹樂團))	Ju Chi Yi Ren (菊池一仁)	Happy Lo	3:39
7.	"愛走秀" (Ài Zǒu Xiù)	Ge Dawei (葛大為)	Xu Hao (徐浩), Randy Chow	Love Is a Show	3:00
8.	"愛。不用說" (Ài Bù Yòng Shuō)	Yao Ruo Long (姚若龍)	KO, Dong Hoon	Love Is Wordless	4:36
9.	"人肉搜索" (Rén Ròu Sōu Suǒ)	Joahua Thompson、Li Zong En (李宗恩)	Andrew Jackson、Gandalf Roudette-Muschamp	Searching For You	4:00
10.	"今天你最漂亮" (Jīn Tiān Nǐ Zuì Piào Liàng)	Yan Yun Nong (嚴云農)	Wilson Tan (陳炯順)	You Are The World's Best Looking Girl	3:47
Total length:					41:47

== Charts ==
=== Weekly charts ===
Chart (2012)	Peak position
Japanese Albums (Oricon)	58
Taiwanese Albums (G-Music)	1

=== Year-end charts ===
Chart (2012)	Position
Taiwanese Albums (Note: Best-selling albums of the year in Taiwan as reported by media outlets)	1

== Sales and certifications ==
Region	Certification	Certified units/sales
Taiwan	—	150,000
