= Trance & Acid =

2002 studio album by Kai Tracid

Studio album by Kai Tracid
- Released: 8 February 2002
- Genre: Trance, acid
- Length: 63:28
- Label: Sony Dance Division
- Producer: Kai Franz

Kai Tracid chronology
Skywalker 1999 (1999)	Trance & Acid (2002)	Contemplate (The Reason You Exist) (2003)

Singles from Trance & Acid
- 1. "Tiefenrausch (The Deep Blue)"; 2. "Too many Times"; 3. "Life is too short" 4. "Trance & Acid"

Professional ratings
Review scores
Source	Rating
Allmusic	2.5/5 stars

Trance & Acid is Kai Tracid's second artist album, released on 8 February 2002. The album features Jade 4U on vocals. The album's singles were "Tiefenrausch (The Deep Blue)", "Too Many Times", "Life Is Too Short", and "Trance & Acid", the title track.

== Track listing ==
No.	Title	Lyrics	Length
1.	"Tracid Theme"		1:19
2.	"Tiefenrausch (The Deep Blue)"		3:59
3.	"Bad Shape"		6:29
4.	"Destiny's Path"	Jade 4U	4:07
5.	"Message Without Words"		4:12
6.	"Too Many Times"		3:54
7.	"Suicide"	Jade 4U	7:16
8.	"Life Is Too Short"		3:45
9.	"Peyote Song"		3:47
10.	"Trance & Acid"	Jade 4U	7:08
11.	"Voyager"		7:19
12.	"Destiny's Path (Warmduscher Remix)"	Jade 4U	6:25
13.	"The Worst Pain Of All"		2:38
Total length:			63:28
