= Shin (band) =

Taiwanese rock band

- Origin: Republic of China (Taiwan)
- Genres: Rock, Mandopop
- Years active: 2002–present
- Label: Avex Taiwan (2002–2006)
- Members: Michael Huang; Tomi Fu; Max Lau; Jason Liu; Lee Q Wu
- Past members: Shin; Chris Sun

Chinese name
- Traditional Chinese: 信樂團
- Simplified Chinese: 信乐团
Transcriptions
Standard Mandarin
- Hanyu Pinyin: Xìn yuètuán
Southern Min
- Hokkien POJ: Sìn ga̍k-thoân

Shin is a Taiwanese five-man Mandopop rock band who debuted in 2002 with their self-titled album, Shin. The name 'Shin' came from the groups's former lead vocalist, Shin. Other members include guitarist Chris, bass player Max, keyboard player Tomi, and drummer Michael.

Apart from Shin's home market of Taiwan, the band also have fans in Mainland China, Hong Kong and among overseas Chinese. The track "一了百了" is listed at number 38 on Hit Fm Taiwan's Hit Fm Annual Top 100 Singles Chart (Hit-Fm年度百首單曲) for 2002.

On 20 March 2007, lead vocalist Shin left the band to launch his solo career. The remaining members spend the next few years looking for a new lead vocalist. In early 2010, Shin debuted with new lead singer Liu Wenjie.

== Band members ==
=== Current members ===
- Michael Huang (黃邁可) – drums, percussion, occasional lead vocals (2002–present)
- Tomi Fu (傅超華) – keyboards, rhythm guitar, backing and occasional lead vocals (2002–present)
- Max Lau (劉曉華) – bass guitar, backing and occasional lead vocals (2002–2021, 2023–present)
- Jason Liu (劉飛鳴; formerly 劉文傑) – lead vocals (2009–present)
- Lee Q Wu (吳力勻) – lead guitar, backing vocals (2023–present)

=== Former members ===
- Shin 信 (蘇見信) – lead vocals (2002–2007)
- Chris Sun (孫志群) – lead guitar, backing and occasional lead vocals (2002–2021)

== Discography ==
Year	Name	Label
May 2002	Shin (信樂團同名專輯)	Avex Taiwan
April 2003	Tian Gao Di Hou (天高地厚)	Avex Taiwan
February 2004	Hai Kuo Tian Kong (海闊天空)	Avex Taiwan
December 2004	Tiao Xin (挑信)	Avex Taiwan
April 2006	One Night @ Mars Concert Live (One Night@火星演唱會Live)	Avex Taiwan
October 2011	Jiu Shi Wei Yi (就是唯一)	

== Filmography ==
- 死了都要愛 - starring role
- At the Dolphin Bay (海豚灣戀人) - cameo
- Westside Story (西街少年) - Chris, Tomi and Shin cameo
