= Avex Taiwan =

Taiwanese record label

Avex Taiwan Inc.
- Company type: Public subsidiary
- Industry: Music and entertainment
- Genre: Music record label
- Founded: July 1998
- Headquarters: 12F-3, No.88, Dunhua N.Road, Taipei, Republic of China (Taiwan)
- Area served: Taiwan
- Products: Planning, creation, and sales of music (CDs) and video (DVDs) software
- Parent: Avex Inc. (Avex Asia Pte. Ltd.)
- Website: www.avex.com.tw

Avex Taiwan Inc (Chinese: 愛貝克思股份有限公司, formerly 艾迴唱片公司 or 艾迴股份有限公司) is an entertainment and record label based in Taiwan. It was founded in July 1998 and is a foreign consolidated subsidiary of parent company Avex Group, based in Japan. As of 2015, Avex Taiwan is managed by Avex International Holdings (Singapore) Proprietary Ltd. (It became a foreign consolidated subsidiary after Avex Group's restructure in April 2004.) Its main businesses are planning, creation, and sales of music (CDs) and video (DVDs). Apart from producing music for artists based in Taiwan, it also distributes for other Avex and foreign artists, such as Kumi Koda and Super Junior.

Avex Taiwan is one of the "Big Four" record labels in Taiwan with Universal Music/EMI/What's Music International, Warner Music Taiwan/Gold Typhoon and Sony Music Taiwan.

In September 2013, the company's consultant, Li Tian-do, announced that the company will withdraw from Chinese music segment, due to poor sales of Chinese music segment.

== Current artists ==
=== Local ===
Note: Singers are at the time of withdrawal from Chinese music division. Distributions are excluded.

- Alan
- Angelababy
- Angelica He
- Dance Flow
- Danson Tang
- Eddie Peng
- Jessie Chiang
- Joe Cheng
- RelaxOne
- Shin – former lead singer of Taiwanese rock band Shin
- Xiaoyu Sung

=== Korean ===
- 10cm
- After School
- Astro
- BoA
- Clazziquai Project
- EXO
- EXO-M
- f(x)
- gugudan
- Henry Lau
- Kangta
- Lena Park
- Loveholic
- Orange Caramel
- SM The Ballad
- Shinee
- Super Junior
- Super Junior-M
- TRAX
- TVXQ
- U-KISS
- Urban Zakapa
- VIXX
- W & Whale
- Winterplay
- Zhang Liyin

=== Japanese ===
- 244 Endli-x+
- AAA
- Acid Black Cherry
- Arashi+
- Cheeky Parade
- Da Pump
- Deep
- Dream
- E-Girls
- Gackt
- Half Life
- Hey! Say! JUMP+
- Hideaki Takizawa
- Hitomi
- Iconiq
- J Soul Brothers
- Jake Shimabukuro+
- KAT-TUN+
- Kazuki Kato
- Ketsumeishi+
- KinKi Kids+
- Kis-My-Ft2
- Kumi Koda
- Lands+
- Livetune+
- Moumoon
- Namie Amuro
- NEWS+
- NYC+
- ravex
- Saori@destiny+
- Super Girls
- Tegomass+
- Tokio+
- Tokyo Girls' Style
- V6
- Yuzu+

note:+non-Avex Japan

=== International ===
- BT
- Armin van Buuren
- FPM
- Max Graham
- Emma Hewitt
- AJ McLean
- John O'Callaghan
- Paul Potts
- Daniel Powter
- Markus Schulz
- Roger Shah
- Connie Talbot
- Tiësto

== Former artists ==
=== Local ===
- A-Lin (2005 to 2013) – moved to Sony Music Taiwan
- Shino Lin – one of the first Avex's artists in Taiwan
- 5566 (2002 to 2004) – moved to Warner Music Taiwan
- Awaking (元衛覺醒) (2004 to 2007) – moved to EMI Music Taiwan
- Cyndi Wang (2003 to 2008) – moved to Gold Typhoon (Taiwan)
- Show Lo (2003 to 2007) – moved to EMI Music Taiwan; then reforming to Gold Typhoon (Taiwan)
- Wu Bai (2003 to 2010) – moved to Universal Music Taiwan
- Vivian Hsu (2003–2007) – moved to Warner Music Taiwan
- Shin (band) (except former lead singer Shin) (2002 to 2006) – moved to Music Nation Wingman Limited; then moved to Skyhigh Records
- Angela An
- Roomie (band)
- Ariel Lin (2009–2010)

=== Japanese ===
- Bright – disbanded
- Daishi Dance (2010) – released "The Ghibli Set" under the label. Currently signed to Universal Music
- Luna Sea (2011 to 2012) – moved to Universal Music

=== Korean ===
- Girls' Generation (2007 to 2010) – distribution moved to Universal Music but merchandise remains at Avex Taiwan as part of SM Official Goods Store Taiwan Branch

== Distributed labels ==
- Johnny & Associates
- SM Entertainment (except Girls' Generation)
- Fluxus Entertainment
- Toy's Factory (since 2012)

== See also ==
- List of record labels
