= Rashomon (album) =

Studio album by Show Lo
- Released: January 15, 2010
- Recorded: 2009
- Genre: Pop; dance; R&B
- Length: 49:40
- Language: Mandarin
- Label: Gold Typhoon (Taiwan)

Show Lo chronology
Trendy Man (2008)	Rashomon (2010)	Remix Collection (2010)

Rashomon (traditional Chinese: 羅生門; simplified Chinese: 罗生门; pinyin: Luó shēng mén) is the seventh Mandarin studio album by Taiwanese recording artist Show Lo. It was released on January 15, 2010, by Gold Typhoon (Taiwan).

A commercial success, Rashomon was the best selling album in Taiwan of 2010 and was certified 5× Platinum by the Recording Industry Foundation in Taiwan (RIT).

== Background and release ==
The album was available on pre-order and three editions were released including the Rashomon (Dance Without Limits 3D MV Collectible Edition) (CD+DVD). It includes a new song "舞法舞天" (Dance Without Limits) and 3D music video of the song, which was the theme song for 2010 Show Lo (Dance Without Limits 3D World Live) World Tour Concert.

== Songs ==
The album's lead track "愛的主場秀" (The Leading Role) is Luo's trademark dance track, for which the music video was filmed at the historic United Palace Theater, New York. The second lead track "習慣就好" (I'll Get Used To It) is in the style of a rock ballad, as well as "為什麼要在一起" (Why Were We Together) which has a jazz feel.

The tracks "愛瘋頭" (Head Over Heels) is the opening theme song; "生理時鐘" (Body Clock), "愛不單行" (You Won't Be Alone) and "In Your Eyes" featuring Rainie Yang (previously included in her fifth studio album Rainie & Love...?) are insert songs of Taiwanese drama Hi My Sweetheart, starring Luo and Yang.

== Commercial performance ==
The album debuted at number one on Taiwan's G-Music Weekly Mandarin and Combo Charts, and Five Music Chart at week 3 (January 15 to 21, 2010) with a percentage sales of 38.96%, 25.19% and 55.72% respectively. It peaked at number one continuously for 10 weeks on all 3 charts and charted on the Mandarin and Combo Charts for 16 weeks and Five Music Chart for 17 weeks.

The album was awarded one of the Top 10 Selling Mandarin Albums of the Year at the 2010 IFPI Hong Kong Album Sales Awards, presented by the Hong Kong branch of IFPI. On December 13, 2010, the album was certificated by Recording Industry Foundation in Taiwan (RIT) for sales of 154,218 copies in Taiwan, for audit period of January 15 to September 30, 2010, thus a certification of five platinums and the best selling album in Taiwan of 2010.

The tracks "愛的主場秀" (The Leading Role), "愛不單行" (You Won't Be Alone) and "舞法舞天" (Dance Without Limits) are listed at number 6, 40 and 57 respectively on Hit Fm Taiwan's Hit Fm Annual Top 100 Singles Chart (Hit-Fm年度百首單曲) for 2010.

== Track listing ==
No.	Title	Lyrics	Music	Translation	Length
1.	"羅生門" (Luó Shēng Mén)	Isaac Chen (陳鎮川)	Troy "Radio" Johnson, Ryan Tedder	Lover's Puzzle	3:01
2.	"愛的主場秀" (Ài De Zhǔ Chǎng Xiù)	David Ke (葛大為)	Xiao An (小安)	The Leading Role	2:34
3.	"生理時鍾" (Shēng Lǐ Shí Zhōng)	Ri Yun (日云) @Sense	Jiang Hui (江暉)	Body Clock	3:59
4.	"習慣就好" (Xí Guàn Jiù Hǎo)	Wonderful, Ah Qin (阿沁)	Ah Qin (阿沁)	I'll Get Used To It	4:11
5.	"危險的念頭" (Wéi Xiǎn De Niàn Tou)	Daryl Yao (姚若龍)	Zhang Yixin (張義欣)	Hazardous Idea	5:02
6.	"愛瘋頭" (Ài Fēng Tóu)	Li Zong En (李宗恩)	Thomas G:son	Head Over Heels	3:12
7.	"愛不單行" (Ài Bù Dān Xíng)	Yan Yunnong (嚴云農)	Ouyang Ye Jun (歐陽業俊)	You Won't Be Alone	4:43
8.	"搞定" (Gǎo Dìng)	Luke"skywalker"Tsui (崔惟楷)	Vincent Degiorgio, Patrick Hamilton, Vincent Pierens	Got You Nailed	3:16
9.	"為什麼要在一起" (Wèi Shé Me Yào Zài Yī Qǐ)	Fangjiong Jia (方炯嘉), Song Shiyao (宋世堯)	Fangjiong Jia (方炯嘉), Song Shiyao (宋世堯)	Why Were We Together	3:21
10.	"老實講" (Lǎo Shí Jiǎng)	Zhengshu Fei (鄭淑妃)	Jacky Li (李俊傑) @口袋音樂	Truth	4:30
11.	"WOW!" (feat Elva Hsiao)	Isaac Chen (陳鎮川)	Zachary Meyers, Michael Hamilto, Ryan Pate, Bobby Newt, Lolene Everett		3:16
12.	"In Your Eyes (眼愛)" (feat Rainie Yang)	Luke"skywalker"Tsui (崔惟楷)	Jeon Jun Gyu		4:31

Bonus track - Rashomon (Dance Without Limits 3D MV Collectible Edition)
No.	Title	Lyrics	Music	Translation	Length
1.	"舞法舞天" (Wu Fa Wu Tian)	Luke"skywalker"Tsui (崔惟楷)	Gabriel Ssezibwa, Rene Prang, Niklas Quang Nielsen, La Quang	Dance Without Limits	4:15

== Releases ==
Three editions (excludes pre-order editions) were released by Gold Typhoon (Taiwan):

- January 15, 2010 - Rashomon (Preorder Edition) (CD) - includes gifts.
- January 15, 2010 - Rashomon (CD)
- February 12, 2010 - Rashomon (Love Doesn't Travel Alone Celebration Edition) (CD+DVD) (羅生門 愛不單行冠軍慶功版) (CD+DVD) - includes gifts.
- March 12, 2010 - Rashomon (Dance Without Limits 3D MV Collectible Edition) (羅生門 舞法舞天3D影音典藏版) (CD+DVD) - includes a new song and 6 MVs:
1. "舞法舞天" (Dance Without Limits) - theme song of 2010 Show Lo (Dance Without Limits 3D World Live) World Tour Concert
2. "舞法舞天" 3D立體紅藍版 (Dance Without Limits) 3D MV - 4:32
3. "舞法舞天" 2D版 (Dance Without Limits) 2D MV - 4:19
4. "愛的主場秀" (The Leading Role) MV - 4:36
5. "習慣就好" (I'll Get Used To It) MV - 4:16
6. "愛瘋頭" (Head Over Heels) MV - 4:14
7. "愛不單行" (Love Doesn't Travel Alone) MV - 4:39

== Charts ==
=== Weekly charts ===
Chart (2010)	Peak position
Taiwanese Albums (G-Music)	1

=== Year-end charts ===
Chart (2010)	Position
Taiwanese Albums (Note: Best-selling albums of the year in Taiwan as reported by media outlets)	1

== Sales and certifications ==
Region	Certification	Certified units/sales
Taiwan (RIT)	5× Platinum	154,218
