= Show Lo =

Taiwanese singer, actor and television host (born 1979)

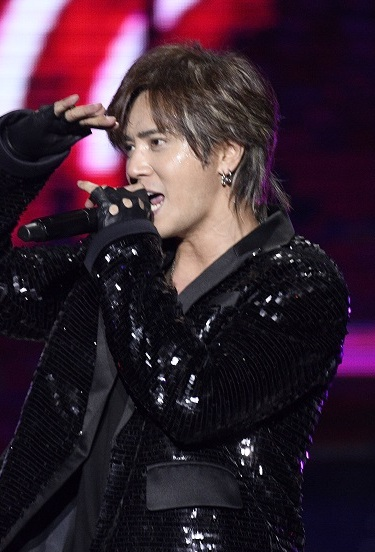
- Lo in 2022
- Born: Lo Chih-hsiang; July 30, 1979 (age 47); Keelung, Taiwan
- Occupations: Singer; actor; television host; businessman
- Years active: 1994–present
- Musical career
- Origin: Taipei, Taiwan
- Genres: Pop; dance; electropop; R&B
- Labels: Avex Taiwan; Gold Typhoon; Sony Music Taiwan; EMI Music Taiwan; Pony Canyon; Warner Music Taiwan

Chinese name
- Traditional Chinese: 羅志祥
- Simplified Chinese: 罗志祥
Transcriptions
Standard Mandarin
- Hanyu Pinyin: Luó Zhìxiáng

Show Lo Chih-hsiang (traditional Chinese: 羅志祥; simplified Chinese: 罗志祥; pinyin: Luó Zhìxiáng; born July 30, 1979), is a Taiwanese singer, actor, and television host. Lo debuted as a member of Taiwanese boy group Four Heavenly Kings in 1996 after winning a singing and dancing competition. When the group disbanded in 1998, he regrouped with former bandmate Eddy Ou as the duo Remeo the same year until they disbanded in 2000.

Lo began his solo music career with his first studio album Show Time (2003). He became the first pop singer to hold a solo concert at the Taipei Arena in 2005, and the first pop singer to hold three concerts within twenty-four hours there in 2010. He had the best-selling album in Taiwan for four consecutive years, from 2010 to 2013.

As an actor, Lo was nominated thrice for the Best Male Actor at the Golden Bell Awards for his performances in TV dramas The Outsiders 2 (2005), Hot Shot (2008), and Hi My Sweetheart (2009). He is also known for his roles in two Stephen Chow blockbusters, Journey to the West: Conquering the Demons (2013) and The Mermaid (2016).

As a television host, Lo was a host of 100% Entertainment from 2001 to 2020, for which he won the Best Host for a Variety Show at the 52nd Golden Bell Awards in 2017 with co-host Linda Chien. He was a cast member of the Chinese reality show Go Fighting! and a judge on Produce 101 and Street Dance of China.

== Early life ==
Show Lo was born in Keelung City, Taiwan. Of mixed ancestry, his father is Han and his mother is Amis. He is an only child, and his parents held multiple odd jobs to support the family when he was growing up. They primarily put up entertainment shows for grassroots events such as weddings, in which his father hosted and his mother sang. Show participated in these entertainment shows as a child, playing the drums onstage when he was just three.

Show is nicknamed Xiao Zhu (Little Pig) because he was really chubby when he was young, weighing over 100 kilograms (220 lb). He was bullied by his classmates for his weight, which made him determined to slim down. During the summer break of his first year in middle school, Show swam and played basketball everyday, shedding weight and reaching 80 kilograms (180 lb) within two months.

Show picked up street dance when he was in middle school and was a member of a street dance group, participating in many dancing competitions in Taiwan. He auditioned successfully for Taipei Hwa Kang Arts School, but was only enrolled there for one school term as his family was unable to afford the school fees. He returned to Keelung and enrolled in Pei De high school's media production course.

== Career ==
=== 1996–2002: Debut ===
In 1996, Show entered and won a singing and dancing competition, impersonating Aaron Kwok. He debuted as member of boy group Four Heavenly Kings with three other contestants who impersonated the other Hong Kong Four Heavenly Kings. The boy group disbanded in 1998 as two members left for compulsory military service, which Show was exempted from because he has Gluteal Fibrotic Contracture. He also suffers from Mitral insufficiency and hence cannot consume food containing caffeine. That same year, he formed a new boy group Romeo with Eddy Ou. They released two albums, but the group soon disbanded too.

From 2000 to 2002, Show's singing career was stalled by a lawsuit with his former management company. He was forced to transit from a teen idol to a variety show entertainer, performing gags on variety shows. His transition into hosting comedy game shows was successful, and he earned the "Triple Crown" title for hosting the three most popular variety shows at one point in time. The sudden cancellation of these variety shows left him jobless for three months, which he refers to as the bleakest moment in his career. During this time period, he also played the male leading role in the idol drama Hi Working Girl, co-starring with Jolin Tsai. The two formed a lasting friendship from this collaboration.

=== 2003–2007: Avex Taiwan and other shows ===
In 2003, Show signed with Avex Taiwan and launched his solo career with the release of his first album Show Time, selling over 80,000 copies. His second album, Expert Show, was released in 2004. The leading dance track "機器娃娃" (Robot Doll), is a hip hop number about the prevalence of electronic pets and on-line relationships. He collaborated with his co-host Dee Shu on the duet "Love Expert" (恋爱达人). Show released his third album Hypnosis Show in 2005. He collaborated with Jolin Tsai for the first lead dance track "Destined Guy" (真命天子).

In 2006, Show Lo created fashion brand STAGE which had branches in Taiwan, Hong Kong, and Singapore. STAGE sponsors clothing for many Taiwanese entertainers, and the brand is often seen on Taiwanese variety shows. He released his fourth album Speshow on November 17, 2006. The lead track, "Dance Gate" (精舞门) is a cover of "James Dean (I Wanna Know)" by Daniel Bedingfield. The Music Video features Show Lo's iconic 椅子舞 (chair dance) and him showing off his versatility, performing various dance styles. For the album, he sang a full length English song for the first time, "Twinkle", with Japanese singer Koda Kumi. Show released his fifth album Show Your Dance on November 16, 2007; he sang the duet "Defeat in Love" (败给你) with Elva Hsiao.

=== 2008–2012: Gold Typhoon, Trendy Man, Rashomon, Only for You and 9ood Show ===
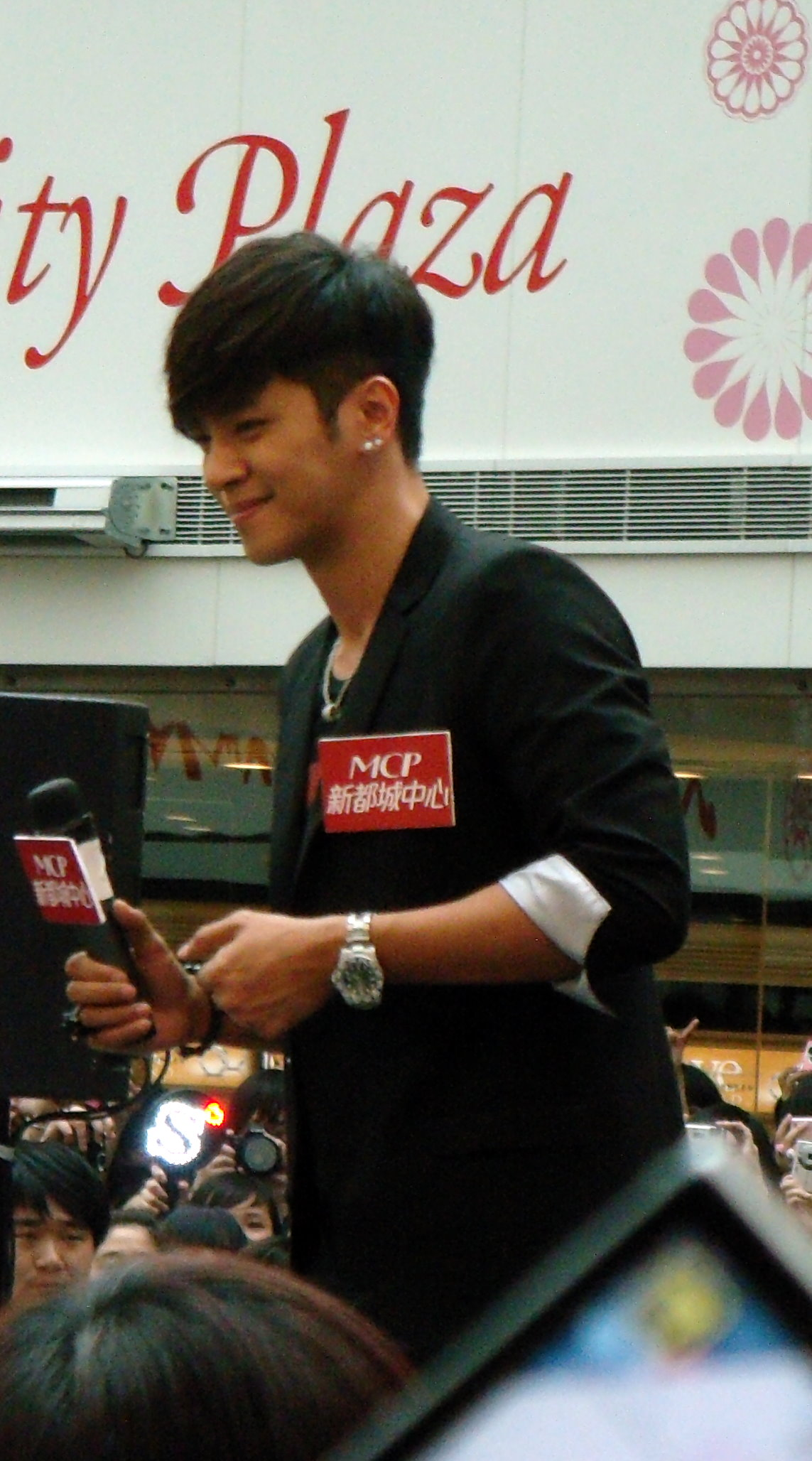
Lo in 2011

In 2008, Show joined forces with Gold Typhoon (Taiwan) and released his sixth album Trendy Man. On September 19, 2009, Show represented Taiwan and performed at the 6th Asia Song Festival, held at the Seoul World Cup Stadium in South Korea. The seventh album, Rashomon, was released in 2010, which held the number one spot on G-music, and the album sold 150,000 copies. His 2010 舞法舞天 (Dance without Limits) World Tour ran for two-and-a-half years, visiting forty-two cities and attracting 600,000 spectators.

Show released his eighth studio album, Only for You was released in February 18, 2011, which the album sold more than 150,000 copies. In 2011, Show signed with Pony Canyon Japan. His first Japanese single "Dante" was released on February 15, 2012. This song made it to the 5th place in Japan's Oricon daily chart during its first day of release, and hit 10th place in the Oricon weekly chart. This record made Show the first Taiwanese male singer to be on the Oricon chart after Teresa Teng. Show's ninth album, 9ood Show was released on April 6, 2012. For this album, Show and his partner Rainie Yang teamed up with Tourism Australia to film a short romance film featuring tourist attractions in Melbourne, Tasmania, and Sydney.

On June 20, 2012, his second Japanese single "Magic" was released. His Japanese studio album "THE SHOW" was released on September 19, 2012. However, the planned trip to Japan to promote his album was not eventuated due to political uproar over the Senkaku Islands between Japan, Taiwan and China. In November 2012, Show announced his new world tour "Over The Limit", starting from January 2013 at Taipei Arena.

=== 2013–2014: Sony Music, Lion Roar ===
In August 2013 Show had joined Sony Music along with Elva Hsiao. He went on a Japanese Tour with partner Rainie Yang to make up for the cancelled tour in 2011. He also released the tenth album Lion Roar, which became the fourth consecutive album to reach over 150,000 copies. In the album, he wrote Taiwanese lyrics for the love song "You Are Mine", which is his first Taiwanese hip-hop song. In his words, the song is about the kind of love that never ends and continues beyond this life, written based on his own experience of a love as deep as that of his parents. In December 2013, Show announced his new encore world tour of "Over The Limit — Dance Soul Returns", starting from January 2014 in Kaohsiung Arena. In 2014, Show joined EMI Music Taiwan along with Rainie Yang and A-mei.

=== 2015–2019: EMI Music Taiwan, Reality Show? ===
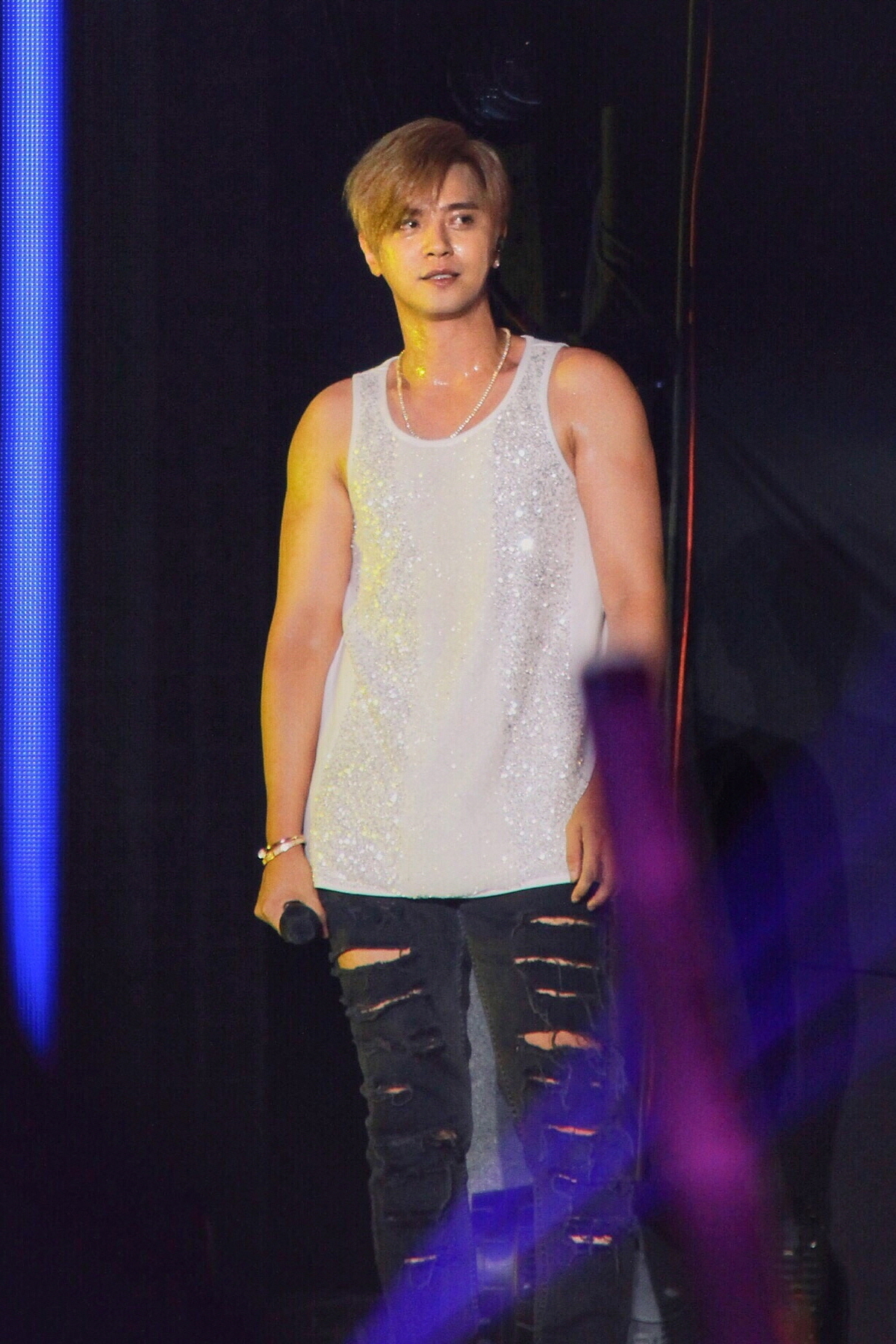
Show Lo in 2017

In 2015, he joined the famous Chinese variety show Go Fighting! with Zhang Yi Xing, Sun Honglei, Huang Lei, Huang Bo and Wang Xun. Show Luo's eleventh album Reality Show? was released on November 20, 2015. The title is derived from Show's personal reflection on his persona, commenting that what he presents has elements of both 'Reality' and of putting on a 'Show'. He co-wrote the music and lyrics for the leading track, "Let Go", which discusses the issue of cyber-bullying. The music video depicts three subjects representing the demographics most vulnerable to cyber-bullying.

Show also created his artist management company, Creation, signing on Linda Chien, his co-host on 100% Entertainment, re-branding her from a children's television presenter to a singer. As of May 2018, he has gone on four world tours.

=== 2020–present: Controversy and musical comeback ===
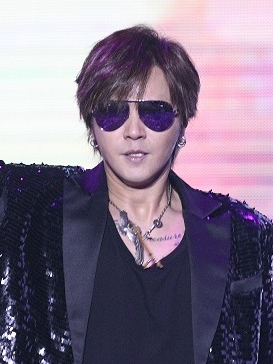
Lo performing in Hualien on New Year's Day 2022

In April 2020, Lo became the subject of significant controversy, for his infidelity and improper behavior with women during a long-term relationship with Chow. Lo reportedly lost US$20 million in appearance fees and endorsements, as companies began removing him from broadcasts and advertisements, including Produce Camp 2020 and Go Fighting!. He staged a comeback on November 20, 2021, with the release of a new song, "Trap Game." In October 2022, He joined Warner Music Taiwan.

In 2023, his first come back TV Reality Show "Top Dog" (Top Dog: 回家) premiered on SET Metro on March 25. Each MC trained and took care of a stray dog for two months and searched for suitable adopters for them. "Top Dog" was nominated for the 59th Golden Bell Award (Best Reality or Game Show) in 2024.

On July 30, 2024, Lo released his 13th album "Wu Zhuang Yuan (Dancing Champions)" (舞状元) five years after his last album. "Wu" referred to "dance", while "Zhuangyuan" stemmed from the title given to the first place of the ancient Chinese Imperial examination. It is also the name for Show’s lead track. This album consisted of nine songs, four of them are new songs, and the rest are a collection of singles he released after 2020. Besides writing lyrics and music for six of the songs, it was the first time Show became the music director for the entire album. Show was also the story writer for his music video "What Else Can I Do?" (我還能怎麼伴.)

The inspiration behind the lead track was Suona, a traditional Chinese instrument Show added to his music. To introduce more oriental styles into his work, Show also added Erhu, Guzheng, and Yangqin, together with hybrid trap and boom bap rhythms, creating a collision between Eastern and Western music. Moreover, "Dancing Champions" resonated with Show’s song "Dance Gate" (精舞门 2006), where he incorporated Dizi.

With the release of his new album, Show held his disc-signing event in Ximen Red House Plaza, Taipei, on August 3, 2024. Such disc signing events became rare in Taiwan as more record companies chose to do online fan meetings. Show announced that this event is free as long as supporters bought his new album. Show also encouraged people to bring all of his past albums for him to sign all at once. Also, he decided to take photos one by one with all the participants. Initially, only the first one thousand fans could get entrance tickets. However, after these tickets were distributed, still there was a long line of fans. So the record company had to rearrange, making sure all fans who purchased the album could enter. This event lasted for twelve hours. Correspondingly, the album sales ranked first during the week of this event, accounting for 5% of total album sales in Taiwan.

Starting in September 2024, he became the dance mentor for TV reality show Scool. This show aimed to select a seven-person boy group through months of training, competitions, and rounds of selections. He worked with several famous Korean singers such as Leeteuk, Eunhyuk, and Hongki. Forty young males from Taiwan, South Korea, and mainland China were contestants in this show. "Scool" first premiered on September 28, 2024.

For the 30th anniversary of Show’s 1995 debut, he plans to run a new round of world tours with his fans, celebrating this milestone. The first stop of these World Tours is on December 28 and 31, 2024, in Kaohsiung Arena, Taiwan.

== Personal life ==
Lo dated Grace Chow (Zhou Yangqing), a Chinese influencer, from 2015 to 2020. On April 23, 2020, Chow accused Lo of serial infidelity, including with Linda Chien, who was signed under his entertainment agency. Lo apologized to Chow via an online post the next day. On April 25, Chien also posted an apology on Instagram.

On March 28, 2025, Lo admitted on Facebook that his mother has been suffering from Alzheimer's disease for the past 3 years.

== Discography ==
- Show Time (2003)
- Expert Show (2004)
- Hypnosis Show (2005)
- Speshow (2006)
- Show Your Dance (2007)
- Trendy Man (2008)
- Rashomon (2010)
- Only for You (2011)
- Good Show (2012)
- The Show (2012)
- Lion Roar (2013)
- Reality Show? (2015)
- No Idea (2019)
- Wu Zhuangyuan (2024)

== Concert tours ==
- Show on Stage World Tour (2007–2010)
- Dance Without Limits World Tour (2010–2011)
- Over the Limit World Tour (2013–2015)
- Crazy World Tour (2016–2018)
- Show Lo Evolution World Tour (2022–2024)
- Show Lo 30th Anniversary World Tour (2024–2026)

== Filmography ==
=== Television series ===
Year	English title	Original title	Role	Notes
1998	When We Nest Together	當我們窩在一起	Lin Ming Zong	
2000	Butterfly Lovers	少年梁祝	Liang Shanbo	
2000	Girls Walk Forward	女生向前走	Luo Jia Xi	Cameo
2001	Spicy Teacher	麻辣鮮師	Yu Zhi Xiang	Cameo
2003	Hi Working Girl	Hi 上班女郎	Cheng Ta-lun	
2004	The Outsiders II	鬥魚II	Yuan Cheng Lie / Xu Ling Gang	
2007	Corner with Love	轉角＊遇到愛	Qin Lang	
2008	Hot Shot	籃球火	Yuan Da Ying	
2009	Hi My Sweetheart	海派甜心	Xue Hai / Lin Da Lang	
2014	Shenzhen	深圳合租記	Song Xiao Lei	

=== Feature film ===
Year	English title	Original title	Role	Notes
2001	Expect a Miracle	蘋果咬一口	Chou Jia Xiang	
2005	Chicken Little	—N/a	Chicken Little	Mandarin voice-over
2007	Bee Movie	—N/a	Barry B. Benson	Mandarin voice-over
2013	Journey to the West: Conquering the Demons	西遊·降魔篇	Prince Important	
2016	Go Fighting!	極限挑戰之皇家寶藏	Himself	
2016	The Mermaid	美人魚	Octopus	
2017	Bleeding Steel	機器之血	Li Sen	

=== Short film ===
Year	English title	Original title	Role	Notes/Ref.
2012	Bringing Joy Home 2012	把樂帶回家	Second child	Pepsi (China) New Year's Special 2012
2012	Heartbeat Love	再一次心跳	Lee Da Cheng	
2013	Bringing Joy Home 2013	把樂帶回家2013	Doctor	Pepsi (China) New Year's Special 2013
2013	Who Is Your Dish	誰是你的菜	Prince Lo	Lay's (China) short film 2013
2014	Bringing Joy Home 2014 (Family)	把樂帶回家2014 親情篇	Shop owner	Pepsi (China) short film 2014
2014	Bringing Joy Home 2014 (Etiquette)	把樂帶回家2014 人情篇	Little Lo	Pepsi (China) short film 2014
2015	Bringing Joy Home 2015	把樂帶回家2015		Pepsi (China) New Year's Special 2015
2015	Who Is Your Dish 2015	誰是你的菜2015	A Zhai	Lay's (China) short film 2015

=== Host ===
Year	English title	Original title	Notes	Description
2003–present	100% Entertainment	娛樂百分百	Host	Entertainment News Show
2015–present	Go Fighting!	極限挑戰	Host 4th Season airing as of 2019-05-29	Reality Game Show
2017	Born To Be A Star	天生是優我	Mentor, Dance instructor	Girl Group Competition
2017	Puppies' Little Helpers	小手牵小狗	House Master	Reality Show about little children training puppies
2018	Street Dance of China	这!就是街舞	Judge	Street Dance Competition
2018	Produce 101	創造101	Dance instructor	Girl Group Competition
2019	Street Dance of China Season 2	这!就是街舞 第二季	Judge	Street Dance Competition
2020	Produce Camp 2020	创造营2020	Cast Member	Girl Group Competition
2024	Scool	Scool	Mentor, Dance Instructor	Boy Group Competition

== Bibliography ==
- September 30, 2002 – Zhu Shi Hui She (autobiography)
- October 9, 2007 – Show on Stage (残酷舞台) (concert)
- December 24, 2010 – Logic (罗辑课) (co-written with his mother)
- August 7, 2014 – Dream Puzzle (极限拼图)
