= Will Pan discography =

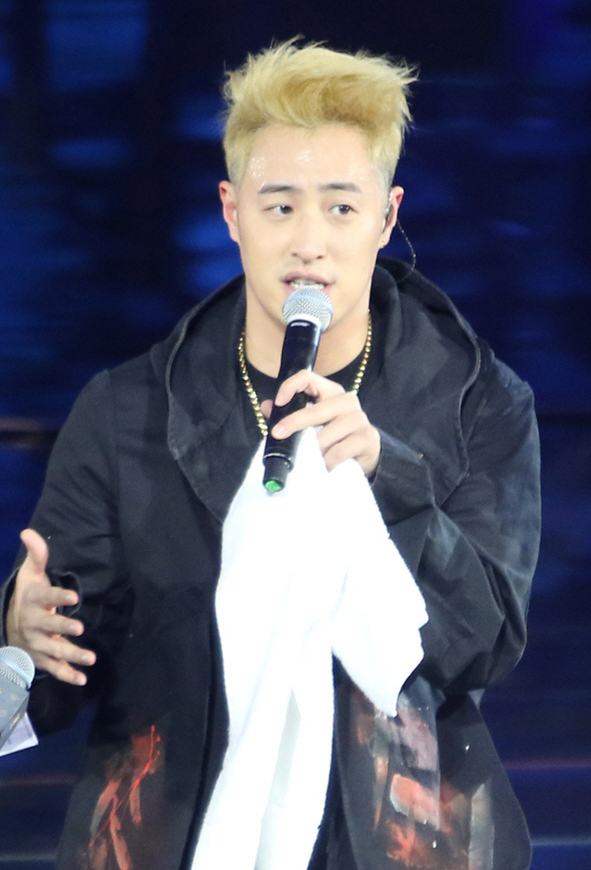
- Pan in 2017
- Studio albums: 12
- Compilation albums: 1
- Singles: 28
- Music videos: 93
- Remix albums: 1
- Video albums: 6

This is the discography of Taiwanese-American recording artist Will Pan (simplified Chinese: 潘玮柏; traditional Chinese: 潘瑋柏). His discography consists of twelve studio albums, one compilation album, one remix album, six video albums, twenty-eight singles and ninety-three music videos.

== Albums ==
=== Studio albums ===
List of studio albums, with release date, label, and sales shown
Title	Album details	Peak chart positions	Sales
Title	Album details	TWN	Sales
Gecko Stroll (壁虎漫步)	Released: December 20, 2002; Label: Universal Music; Formats: CD, digital download	—	TWN: 130,000
Pass Me the Mic (我的麥克風)	Released: September 19, 2003; Label: Universal Music; Formats: CD, digital download	—	
Wu Ha	Released: September 3, 2004; Label: Universal Music; Formats: CD, digital download	—	
The Expert (高手)	Released: July 8, 2005; Label: Universal Music; Formats: CD, digital download	3	
Around the World (反轉地球)	Released: June 23, 2006; Label: Universal Music; Formats: CD, digital download	3	
Play It Cool (玩酷)	Released: September 14, 2007; Label: Universal Music; Formats: CD, digital download	1	
007 (零零七)	Released: May 22, 2009; Label: Universal Music; Formats: CD, digital download	1	
808	Released: January 14, 2011; Label: Universal Music; Formats: CD, digital download, streaming	1	
The Story of Billy (24個比利)	Released: August 31, 2012; Label: Universal Music; Formats: CD, digital download, streaming	1	
Crown & Clown (王者丑生)	Released: June 13, 2014; Label: Universal Music; Formats: CD, digital download, streaming	1	
illi (異類)	Released: August 11, 2017; Label: Warner Music Taiwan; Formats: CD, digital download, streaming	—	
Mr. R&Beats (節奏先生)	Released: September 10, 2020; Label: Warner Music Taiwan; Formats: CD, digital download, streaming	1	

=== Compilation albums ===
List of compilation albums
Title	Album details	Peak chart positions
Title	Album details	TWN
Will's Future (Will's 未來式)	Released: July 18, 2008; Label: Universal Music; Formats: CD, digital download, streaming	1

=== Remix albums ===
Title	Album details
Will Pan's Freestyle Remix 2005	Released: December 16, 2005; Label: Universal Music; Formats: CD, digital download

== Singles ==
=== As lead artist ===
Title	Year	Album
"Tender Girl"	2002	Great Teacher OST
"I Talk to the Sky"	2016	The Kid from Heaven OST
"Slow Motion" (featuring Guan Xiaotong)	2016	Non-album singles
"Moonlight" (featuring Tia Ray)	2018	Non-album singles
"Love You 3000" (featuring Boom & Sean T)	2019	Non-album singles
"All the Way Up"	2021	Non-album singles
"Plum Rain Season"	2023	Non-album singles
"Nightless Night"	2023	Non-album singles
"Mad Love"	2023	Non-album singles
"Wo Men Zhi Dao Jiu Hao"	2024	Non-album singles

=== As featured artist ===
Title	Year	Album
"Bound" (Fan Hsiao-fun featuring Will Pan)	2002	Great Teacher OST
"Play Cool" (Alec Su featuring Will Pan)	2002	Playing Cool
"Dip It Low (Asian Mix)" (Christina Milian featuring Will Pan)	2004	It's About Time (Taiwan version)
"Yeah" (Energy featuring Will Pan)	2005	Final Fantasy
"Unexpectedly" ( Alisa Galper featuring Will Pan)	2009	Alisa
"Be with You (Asia Version)" (Akon featuring Will Pan)	2009	Freedom (Asia version)

=== Collaborations ===
English title	Year	Album
"Youth Is Great" (with cast members of Great Teacher)	2002	Great Teacher Original Soundtrack
"5000 Minutes" (with Chang Shan-wei and Chris Kuo)	2002	Great Teacher Original Soundtrack
"I Do" (with Tu Shih-mei)	2002	Great Teacher Original Soundtrack
"Universal Love" (with Energy and Evonne Hsu)	2003	U Love
"Fame Around the World" (with Jacky Cheung and S.H.E)	2008	The Official Album for the Beijing 2008 Olympic Games
"The First Flame"	2023	City of Museums main theme song

=== Charity singles ===
English title	Year	Album
"Life Is Like a Song" (with various artists)	2001	Non-album single
"Hand in Hand" (with various artists)	2003	Hand in Hand
"Love (Taiwan Version)" (with various artists)	2005	Love No Boundaries
"Love & Love" (with various artists of Universal Music)	2012	Non-album single

=== Promotional singles ===
English title	Year	Notes
"As Long as I Love You" (with Lee Hyori)	2009	Beijing Hyundai i30 commercial single
"Never Get Low" (with Jam Hsiao, Henry Lau and Vava)	2019	Jumanji: The Next Level Chinese official theme song

== Credited songs ==
=== Songs written and performed by Will Pan ===
This list contains songs written and/or produced by Pan, including those where he is credited as co-author.

Released	Album	Track title	Notes
2002	Gecko Stroll	Tell Me	Co-lyricist with Kevin Yi (Mandarin version lyrics)
2002	Gecko Stroll	Just When I Needed You Most	Co-lyricist with Kevin Yi (Mandarin version lyrics)
2002	Gecko Stroll	Good Love	Rap lyricist (Mandarin version lyrics)
2002	Gecko Stroll	學不會; Can Not Learn	Rap lyricist
2002	Gecko Stroll	特別來賓; Special Guest (remix)	Rap lyricist
2003	Pass Me the Mic	咖哩辣椒; Curry Chili	Co-lyricist with Jason Tang and Albert Leung (Mandarin version lyrics)
2003	Pass Me the Mic	If I Can't Have You	Lyricist (Mandarin version lyrics)
2003	Pass Me the Mic	How Are You	Lyricist (Mandarin version lyrics)
2003	Pass Me the Mic	有話直說; Speak Truth	Co-lyricist with Francis Lee
2004	Wu Ha	Wu Ha	Rap lyricist
2004	Wu Ha	快樂崇拜; Adoration to Happiness	Rap lyricist (Mandarin version lyrics)
2005	The Expert	誰是 MVP; Who's MVP	Lyricist; Composer
2005	The Expert	不得不愛; Cannot Not Love	Rap lyricist (Mandarin version lyrics)
2005	The Expert	不要忘了我; Don't Forget Me	Rap lyricist (Mandarin version lyrics)
2005	The Expert	決戰鬥室; Battle Room	Composer
2005	The Expert	一指神功; Android	Co-lyricist with Yi Da Li (義大利)
2005	The Expert	愛很容易; Love is Easy	Rap lyricist
2005	Will Pan's Freestyle Remix 2005	背水一戰; Never Lose	Lyricist (Mandarin version lyrics)
2006	Around the World	反轉地球; Around The World	Co-lyricist with Yi Da Li; Rap producer
2006	Around the World	戴上我的愛; Wear My Love	Rap lyricist
2006	Around the World	來電; Incoming Call	Lyricist; Composer; Rap producer
2006	Around the World	我想更慬你; Want To Know You	Rap lyricist
2006	Around the World	無所不在; Every Where	Rap lyricist; Composer
2006	Around the World	街頭詩人; Street Poet	Rap producer
2006	Around the World	謝謝; Thank You	Composer
2006	Around the World	Pan@sonic	Co-lyricist with Jeremy Ji and Guang Tou Wei (光頭偉); Rap producer
2007	Play It Cool	玩酷; Play It Cool	Co-lyricist with Lee Nian-he (李念和); Co-composer with Jeremy Ji
2007	Play It Cool	光榮; Glory	Rap lyricist
2007	Play It Cool	完美故事; Perfect Story	Composer
2007	Play It Cool	白日夢; Daydream	Lyricist; Composer; Producer
2007	Play It Cool	說你愛我; Say You Love Me	Lyricist; Composer
2007	Play It Cool	愛不離; Love Doesn't Leave	Verse rap lyricist
2007	Play It Cool	無法抗拒; Unable To Resist	Lyricist; Composer
2007	Play It Cool	左右; Left Right	Co-composer with Jeremy Ji
2007	Play It Cool	Shut Up	Rap lyricist
2008	Will's Future	夏日瘋; Summer Craze	Lyricist; Composer
2008	Will's Future	轉機; Transfer	Composer
2009	007	雙人舞; Pas de Deux	Composer; Co-producer
2009	007	限量發行; Limited Edition	Rap lyricist; Co-composer with Jeremy Ji; Co-producer
2009	007	無重力; Weightless	Composer; Producer
2009	007	Be With You	Rap lyricist
2009	007	親愛的; My Dear	Composer; Co-producer
2009	007	Everytime's Good Time	Rap lyricist
2009	007	怎麼著; How	Lyricist; Composer; Co-producer
2009	007	Don't Wanna Say Goodbye	Co-composer with Jeremy Ji
2011	808	全面通緝; Totally Wanted	Co-composer with Terry Tye Lee (梁永泰)
2011	808	觸動; Touch	Lyricist; Composer
2011	808	U U U	Composer
2011	808	次世代; Next Century	Lyricist; Rearranger
2011	808	最終; In the End	Co-lyricist with Wu Yi-chien (吳以健) and Tseng Chen-ju (曾真如); Composer
2012	The Story of Billy	24個比利; The Story of Billy	Lyricist; Composer; Co-producer
2012	The Story of Billy	釋放自己; Release Yourself	Lyricist; Composer; Co-producer
2012	The Story of Billy	華麗進行曲; Extravagant March	Lyricist; Co-composer with Jon Hendricks; Co-producer
2012	The Story of Billy	不想醒來; Don't Wanna Wake Up	Composer; Co-producer
2012	The Story of Billy	那一天; That Day	Lyricist
2012	The Story of Billy	專屬於你; Absolutely Yours	Co-lyricist with Lee Nian-he; Composer; Co-producer
2012	The Story of Billy	Baby Tonight	Lyricist; Composer; Co-producer
2014	Crown & Clown	小丑; Clown	Lyricist; Composer; Co-producer
2014	Crown & Clown	打呼; Snore (featuring Rainie Yang)	Lyricist; Composer; Co-producer
2014	Crown & Clown	利柏拉契; Liberace	Lyricist; Composer; Co-producer
2014	Crown & Clown	王者之聲; The King's Speech	Lyricist; Composer; Co-producer
2014	Crown & Clown	伊甸園; Garden of Eden	Lyricist; Composer; Co-producer
2014	Crown & Clown	明天過後; The Day After Tomorrow	Lyricist; Composer; Co-producer
2014	Crown & Clown	最後一支舞; The Last Dance	Co-lyricist with Luke Tsui (崔惟楷); Composer; Co-producer
2014	Crown & Clown	Mr. Right	Co-lyricist with Wesbou Wu; Co-producer
2014	Crown & Clown	我最搖擺; I Am So Fresh	Co-lyricist with Harlem Yu; Co-composer with Harlem Yu
2014	Crown & Clown	柏拉圖的異想世界; Plato's Fancy World	Rap lyricist; Composer; Co-producer
2016		漫動作 "Slow Motion" (featuring Gabrielle Guan)	Co-lyricist with Wesbou Wu; Composer; Co-producer
2017	illi	Coming Home	Lyricist; Composer
2017	illi	第三類接觸; Close Encounter	Lyricist; Composer
2017	illi	啞巴; Numb	Lyricist; Composer
2017	illi	稀罕沒理由 (featuring 吳昕); No Reasons (featuring Orfila)	Lyricist; Composer
2017	illi	第三類接觸 (寂寞版); Close Encounter (Lonely Version)	Lyricist; Composer
2017	illi	硬鬧; Go Hard	Co-lyricist with NESE; Co-composer with NESE
2017	illi	致青春; Dear Memories	Co-lyricist with Takey
2017	illi	根本沒愛過; Never Loved	Co-lyricist with JerryC
2017	illi	失眠; Insomnia	Co-lyricist with Jhen (Future Sound); Co-composer with Jhen (Future Sound)
2017	illi	Crank 鏘	Lyricist
2017	illi	Fight For You	Lyricist
2018		Moonlight (featuring Tia Ray)	Co-written with Sibel Redžep, Dashawn “Happie” White and Chaz Jackson
2019		Love You 3000 (featuring Boom & Sean T)	Co-written with Boom & Sean T; Producer
2020	Mr. R&Beats	To Be Loved	Co-written with August Rigo Klein, Daniel Stephen Campfield, Matt Wayne and Trevor David Brown; Co-produced with Jeremy Ji
2020	Mr. R&Beats	Second Option 第二順位	Co-written with Hyuk Shin, Mrey and Joseph Tilley; Co-produced with Jeremy Ji
2020	Mr. R&Beats	Second Option (acoustic version) 第二順位 (寂他版)	Co-written with Hyuk Shin, Mrey and Joseph Tilley; Co-produced with Jeremy Ji
2020	Mr. R&Beats	Mr. R&Beats 節奏先生	Co-written with Hyuk Shin and Blair Taylor; Co-produced with Jeremy Ji
2020	Mr. R&Beats	Babylon 巴比倫	Co-written with Chaz Jackson and Dashawn Happie White; Co-produced with Jeremy Ji
2020	Mr. R&Beats	Don't Kill My Vibe (featuring Sibel Redžep)	Co-written with Chaz Jackson, Dashawn “Happie” White and Sibel Redžep; Co-produced with Jeremy Ji
2020	Mr. R&Beats	Kisses	Co-written with Chaz Jackson, Dashawn “Happie” White, Sibel Redžep and Michael Jimines; Co-produced with Jeremy Ji
2020	Mr. R&Beats	Faded 飛	Co-written with August Rigo, William Zaire Simmons and Trevor David Brown; Co-produced with Jeremy Ji
2020	Mr. R&Beats	Holy Grail 天生尤物	Co-written with Luke B.T. Tsui; Co-produced with Jeremy Ji
2020	Mr. R&Beats	Love You Hate You 有愛又恨	Co-written and co-produced with Jeremy Ji
2021		"All the Way Up"	Lyricist and composer
2023		"Plum Rain Season" 梅雨季	Co-producer
2023		"Nightless Night" 今夜不回家	Co-lyricist and co-composer; Executive producer
2023		"Mad Love" 狂愛	Co-lyricist, co-composer, co-producer
2024		"Wo Men Zhi Dao Jiu Hao" 我們知道就好	Co-producer

=== Songs written by Will Pan for other artists ===
Pan has written/co-written songs that were later recorded and released by other artists.

Released	Artist	Track title	Album	Notes
2002	Fan Hsiao-fun	束縛; Restrained	麻辣鮮師電視原聲帶; Great Teacher Original Soundtrack	Rap lyricist
2002	Evonne Hsu	特別來賓; Special guest	Lonely Ballet	Rap lyricist
2004	Christina Milian	Dip It Low (Asian Mix Feat. Will Pan)	It's About Time (Taiwan Version)	Rap lyricist
2008	Jerry Wu	手拉手; Hand In Hand	偏偏愛上你; Destined to Love You	Co-composer with Jeremy Ji
2008	Jessie Chiang	浪漫愛; Romantic Love	晴天娃娃; Teru Teru Bozu	Lyricist
2011	JPM	因為有你; Because of You	Moonwalk	Composer; Co-lyricist with Prince Chiu
2012	Various artists (Universal Music)	愛X愛; Love X Love		Lyricist; Composer
2019	Show Lo	Birthday	No Idea	Lyricist

== Videography ==
=== Video albums ===
English title	Chinese title	Released	Label
Gecko Stroll (VCD)	壁虎漫步 影音專輯	July 3, 2003	Universal Music
Will Show Music Video Karaoke (VCD)	Will Show 威兒秀 影音專輯 VCD	January 9, 2004	Universal Music
Wu Ha DVD	Wu Ha 精選影音專輯 DVD	December 29, 2004	Universal Music
Will Pan 2006-2007 Around The World Concert Tour	反轉地球世界巡迴演唱會2006-2007巡演全記錄	July 20, 2007	Universal Music
Eden Concert 2015 Live	王者歸來 伊殿園演唱會台北小巨蛋	December 25, 2015	Universal Music
Alpha Live USB	Alpha 創使者世界巡迴演唱會 Live USB	June 5, 2020	Warner Music Taiwan

=== Music videos ===
Year	Album	English track title	Chinese track title	Director	Other performer(s)
2001		Life Is Like A Song	生活就像一首歌	Wenders Li (李棟全)	Various artists
2002	Great Teacher Original Soundtrack 麻辣鮮師 電視原聲帶	Youth Is Great	青春真偉大	Joshua Lin (林炳存)	Cast members of Great Teacher
2002	Great Teacher Original Soundtrack 麻辣鮮師 電視原聲帶	Tender Girl	溫柔女孩		
2002	Great Teacher Original Soundtrack 麻辣鮮師 電視原聲帶	5000 minutes	5000分鐘		Cast members of Great Teacher
2002	Great Teacher Original Soundtrack 麻辣鮮師 電視原聲帶	I Do			Tu Shih-mei
2002	Gecko Stroll	Gecko Stroll	壁虎漫步	@pple (李豐博)	
2002	Gecko Stroll	Tell Me		Kuang Sheng (鄺盛)	
2002	Gecko Stroll	Just When I Needed You Most		ShowX2 (陳勇秀)	
2002	Gecko Stroll	I'm Not Afraid	我不怕	Kuang Sheng	
2002	Gecko Stroll	Kiss Me 123		ShowX2	
2002	Gecko Stroll	Good Love		ShowX2	Lara Veronin
2002	Gecko Stroll	X Spy		Bill Chia	
2002	Gecko Stroll	By My Side	站在你這邊		
2002	Gecko Stroll	Can Not Learn	學不會		
2002	Lonely Ballet	Special Guest	特別來賓	Bingo Chang (張清峰)	Evonne Hsu
2003 |! scope="row" | U Love	Universal Love		ShowX2	Energy & Evonne Hsu	
2003 |! scope="row" | U Love	Hand in Hand 手牽手	Hand In Hand	手牽手	Yuan Hsu-hu (袁緒虎)	Various artists
2003 |! scope="row" | U Love	Pass Me the Mic	Pass Me The Mic	我的麥克風	@pple	
2003 |! scope="row" | U Love	Pass Me the Mic	Love The Future You	愛上未來的妳	ShowX2	
2003 |! scope="row" | U Love	Pass Me the Mic	Curry Chilli	咖哩辣椒	@pple	Jason Tang
2003 |! scope="row" | U Love	Pass Me the Mic	If I Can't Have You			
2004	Wu Ha	Wu Ha		Jeff Chang (張時霖)	
2004	Wu Ha	Adoration to Happiness	快樂崇拜	ShowX2	Angela Chang
2004	Wu Ha	Letting You Go	我讓你走了	ShowX2	
2004	Wu Ha	Kiss Night			
2004	It's About Time (Taiwan Version)	Dip It Low (Asian Mix)		Matthew Rolston	Christina Milian
2005	Love No Boundaries 愛心無國界演藝界大匯演 (南亞震災曲)	Love (Taiwan Version)	愛 (台灣版)		Various artists
2005	The Expert	Who's MVP	誰是 MVP	Marlboro Lai (賴偉康)	Claire Kuo
2005	The Expert	Cannot Not Love	不得不愛	Kuang Sheng	Zhang Xianzi
2005	The Expert	The Expert	高手	The Jam Council (徐仁峰)	Vince from "The Iron Bamboo" (張敖杰 (鐵竹堂)), Rachel Ngan (顏穎思)
2005	The Expert	Leave With Me	跟我走吧		
2005	Will Pan's Freestyle Remix 2005	Battle Room	決戰鬥室	Kuang Sheng	
2005	Will Pan's Freestyle Remix 2005	Android	一指神功	Kuang Sheng	Apple & Yao Yao
2006	Around the World	Around The World	反轉地球	ShowX2	Pan@sonic
2006	Around the World	Mesmerised	著迷	ShowX2	Stacey Chen
2006	Around the World	Wear My Love	戴上我的愛	Marlboro Lai	Wang Luodan & Lisa Wang
2006	Around the World	Chances	機會		Maggie Wu
2006	Around the World	Incoming Call	來電	Marlboro Lai	
2006	Around the World	Want To Know You	我想更慬你	Peter (皮特一二人)	Su Rui & Tender Huang
2006	Around the World	Thank You	謝謝	Tong Lin (林錦和)	
2007	Play It Cool	Play It Cool	玩酷	Marlboro Lai	
2007	Play It Cool	Perfect Story	完美故事	Tong Lin	
2007	Play It Cool	Road Too Windy	路太彎	Tong Lin	Tarcy Su
2007	Play It Cool	Say You Love Me	說你愛我	Leste Chen	Angus Chang
2007	Play It Cool	Love Doesn't Leave	愛不離	Tong Lin	Betty Sun
2007	Play It Cool	Unable To Resist	無法抗拒	Muh Chen	
2007	Play It Cool	Shut Up		Da Bao Dao 大寶導	Shin
2007	Play It Cool	Left Right	左右		
2008	Will's Future	Transfer	轉機	Tong Lin	Serena Fang
2008	Will's Future	Summer Craze	夏日瘋	The Jam Council	
2008	Will's Future	Same Regret	同一個遺憾	Lv Lai Hui (呂來慧)	Jeremy Ji & Jessie Chiang
2008	The Official Album for the Beijing 2008 Olympic Games	Red Around The World	紅遍全球		Jacky Cheung & S.H.E
2009		As Long As I Love You	只要愛上你	Cha Eun-taek	Lee Hyori
2009	Alisa	Unexpectedly	出乎意料	Bill Chia, Bounce	Alisa Galper
2009	007	Pas de Deux	雙人舞	Chang Jae-hyuk	Lee Da-hae
2009	007	Weightless	無重力	Shockley Huang	Andrea Chen
2009	007	Be With You		Da Bao Dao (大寶導)	
2009	007	My Dear	親愛的	Da Bao Dao (大寶導)	
2009	007	Silence Room for Rent	寂屋出租	Tong Lin	Annie Chen
2011	808	Totally Wanted	全面通緝	Bill Chia, Bounce	
2011	808	Touch	觸動	The Jam Council	Nichkhun
2011	808	U U U		Marlboro Lai	
2011	808	We Are All Afraid of Pain	我們都怕痛	Tong Lin	Sandrine Pinna & Lin Yo-wei (featuring footages from television series Endless Love)
2011	808	Small Ant	小小螞蟻	Tong Lin	
2012	The Story of Billy	The Story of Billy	24個比利	Hong Won-ki	
2012	The Story of Billy	What Can I Do		Jennifer Wu (珍妮花)	
2012	The Story of Billy	Forgetting The Hug	忘記擁抱	Jennifer Wu (珍妮花)	Hsu Wei-ning
2012	The Story of Billy	Extravagant March	華麗進行曲	Jennifer Wu (珍妮花)	Jeremy Ji & Moko Kuo
2012	The Story of Billy	Absolutely Yours	專屬於你	Jennifer Wu (珍妮花)	Mini Tsai
2012	The Story of Billy	Don't Wanna Wake Up	不想醒來	Jennifer Wu (珍妮花)	
2012	The Story of Billy	Baby tonight		Jennifer Wu (珍妮花)	
2012	The Story of Billy	Release Yourself	釋放自己		
2012	Non-album single	Love X Love	愛X愛		Various artists
2014	Crown & Clown	Clown	小丑	Hong Won-ki	
2014	Crown & Clown	Snore	打呼	One Two Free	Rainie Yang
2014	Crown & Clown	The King's Speech	王者之聲	Bill Chia, Bounce	
2014	Crown & Clown	Alone	一個人	Jude Chen	
2014	Crown & Clown	Mr. Right		Jude Chen	
2016	Traces of Time in Love	The Audience	觀眾	Leste Chen	Rainie Yang, Mike He and Show Lo
2017	illi	Coming Home		Bboydry	
2017	illi	Close Encounter	第三類接觸		
2017	illi	Numb	啞巴	Ou Che-lun	
2017	illi	Dear Memories	致青春	Ocean Peng	Vava and Wang Linkai
2018		Moonlight			Tia Ray
2019		Moonlight (remix)			Tia Ray
2019		Love You 3000	愛你 3000	Lee Bu-kong	Boom & Sean T
2020	Mr. R&Beats	To Be Loved		Zen Huang	
2020	Mr. R&Beats	Second Option	第二順位	Ares Wu	
2020	Mr. R&Beats	Babylon	巴比倫	Birdy Nio	
2023		Plum Rain Season	梅雨季	Zen Huang	Jean Ho and Yu Jie-en
2023		Nightless Night	今夜不回家	Ares Wu	
2023		Mad Love	狂愛	Hong Won-ki and Park Sang-won	
