= Will's Future =

- Will's Future (2 CD+DVD) edition cover

Compilation album Will's 未來式 by Will Pan
- Released: 18 July 2008
- Genre: Mandopop, hip hop, rap
- Language: Mandarin
- Label: Universal Music Taiwan

Will Pan chronology
Play It Cool (2007)	Will's Future (2008)	007 (2009)

Alternative cover

Will's Future (traditional Chinese: Will's 未來式; simplified Chinese: Will's 未来式) is Taiwanese Mandopop artist Will Pan's (Chinese: 潘瑋柏) first Mandarin compilation album. It was released by Universal Music Taiwan on 18 July 2008, between Will's sixth album Play It Cool in 2007 and seventh album 007 in 2009.

The initial release contains two CDs and a bonus DVD with 12 music videos. It features three new tracks, two medley remixes and 29 previously released songs, from his debut album Gecko Stroll in 2002 to his sixth album Play It Cool in 2007, as well as one track from Will Pan's Freestyle Remix 2005. The album is organized with dance tracks on CD one and ballads on CD two. One of the new tracks is the opening theme song, "夏日瘋" (Summer Craze) of 2008 Taiwanese drama Miss No Good, starring Will, Rainie Yang and Dean Fujioka.

A second edition was released by Universal Music Taiwan on 24 October 2008, Will's Future (Trend Expert Limited Edition) (3 CD) (未來式 時尚達人限定版) with a bonus CD containing insert song, "同一個遺憾" (Same Regret) by Will Pan and Blue J (紀佳松), and four instrumental tracks from Miss No Good.

The track "夏日瘋" (Summer Craze) is listed at number 52 on Hit Fm Taiwan's Hit Fm Annual Top 100 Singles Chart (Hit-Fm年度百首單曲) for 2008.

== Track listing ==
CD 1 - Will Pan Dance Around the World - new tracks in bold

1. Intro
2. **"夏日瘋" Xià rì fēng (Summer Craze)**
3. "白日夢" Bái rì mèng (Daydream)
4. "壁虎漫步" Bìhǔ mànbù (Gecko Stroll)
5. "反轉地球" Fǎn zhuǎn dìqiú (Around The World)
6. "誰是MVP" Shéi shì MVP (Who's MVP)
7. "高手" Gāo shǒu (The Expert)
8. "光榮" Guāngróng (Glory)
9. "決戰鬥室" Juézhàn dǒushì (Battle Room)
10. "玩酷" Wán Kù (Play It Cool)
11. "Wu Ha"
12. "一指神功" Yī zhǐ shéngōng (Android) - remix
13. "Shut Up" - feat Shin
14. "Tell Me"
15. "來電" Láidiàn (Incoming Call)
16. "我的麥克風" Wǒ de màikèfēng (Pass Me The Mic)
17. "快樂崇拜" Kuàilè chóngbài (Adoration to Happiness) - feat Angela Chang
18. "Will Power" - medley:"壁虎漫步" (Gecko Stroll)+"高手" (The Expert)+"反轉地球" (Around The World)+"我的麥克風" (Pass Me The Mic)+"玩酷" (Play It Cool)

CD 2 - Will Pan Love Ballads - new tracks in bold

1. **"轉機" Zhuǎnjī (Transfer)**
2. "謝謝" Xièxiè (Thank You)
3. "不得不愛" Bùdé bú ài (Cannot Not Love) - feat Zhang Xianzi
4. "我讓你走了" Wǒ ràng nǐ zǒu liǎo (Letting You Go)
5. "Kiss Me 123"
6. "我不怕" Wǒ bú pà (I'm Not Afraid)
7. "路太彎" Lù tài wān (Road Too Winding)
8. "我們都會錯" Wǒmen dūhuì cuò (We're Both Wrong)
9. "戴上我的愛" Dài shàng wǒ de ài (Wear My Love) - feat Wang Luo Dan (王珞丹)
10. "愛上未來的你" Ài shàng wèilái de nǐ (Love The Future You)
11. "說你愛我" Shuō nǐ ài wǒ (Say You Love Me)
12. "站在你這邊" Zhàn zài nǐ zhè biān (By My Side)
13. "Just When I Need You Most"
14. "How Are You"
15. "Kiss Night"
16. **"轉機" Zhuǎnjī (Transfer) (Cantonese version)**
17. "Will Story" - medley:"不得不愛" (Cannot Not Love)+"Kiss Me 123"+"愛上未來的你" (Love The Future You)+"謝謝" (Thank You)+"路太彎" (Road Too Windy)

== Bonus DVD/CD ==
DVD - music videos - Will's Future (2CD+DVD) edition

1. "快樂崇拜" (Adoration to Happiness) - feat Angela Chang
2. "路太彎" (Road Too Windy) - feat Tarcy Su
3. "高手" (The Expert)
4. "我的麥克風" (Pass Me The Mic)
5. "Wu Ha"
6. "玩酷" (Play It Cool)
7. "不得不愛" (Cannot Not Love) - feat Zhang Xianzi
8. "壁虎漫步" (Gecko Stroll)
9. "反轉地球" (Around The World)
10. "我想更懂你" (Want To Know You) - feat Su Rui
11. "Shut Up" - feat Shin
12. "戴上我的愛" (Wear My Love) - feat Wang Luo Dan (王珞丹)

CD - Will's Future (Trend Expert limited Edition) (3CD)

1. "同一個遺憾" (Same Regret) by Will Pan and Blue J (紀佳松)
2. "同一個遺憾-鋼琴配樂版" (Same Regret-piano instrumental version)
3. "同一個遺憾-吉他配樂版" (Same Regret-guitar instrumental version)
4. "夏日瘋-鋼琴配樂版" (Summer Craze-piano instrumental version)
5. "夏日瘋-吉他配樂版" (Summer Craze-guitar instrumental version)
