= Crown & Clown =

- Crown & Clown cover

Studio album 王者丑生 by Will Pan
- Released: 13 June 2014
- Genre: Mandopop, Dance, R&B, Trap
- Length: 39:48
- Language: Mandarin
- Label: Universal Music Taiwan
- Producer: Will Pan, Jeremy Ji, Chen Wei Quan, Bi Daniel, Terry Tye Lee

Will Pan chronology
The Story of Billy (2012)	Crown & Clown (2014)	illi (2017)

Singles from Crown & Clown
- 1. "打呼 (Snore)" Released: 4 June 2014

Crown & Clown (Chinese: 王者丑生; pinyin: Wángzhě Chǒushēng) is the tenth studio album by Taiwanese Mandopop artist Will Pan (Chinese: 潘瑋柏). It was released by Universal Music Taiwan on 13 June 2014. The album features eleven tracks mainly written and co-produced by Pan. Other contributors include his frequent collaborator Jeremy Ji, Bi Daniel, Luke Tsui and Terry Tye Lee, among others. The album also features a duet, "打呼" (Snore), with Rainie Yang, which is also the opening theme song of Taiwanese television series Tie The Knot (媽咪的男朋友).

A deluxe edition was released on 8 August 2014 with a bonus DVD containing six music videos, a dance music video of the track "小丑" (Crown), and 30 minutes of bonus footage.

== Track listing ==
Crown & Clown — Standard edition
No.	Title	Lyrics	Music	Translation	Length
1.	"利柏拉契" (lì bó lā qì)	Will Pan	Will Pan	Liberace	1:42
2.	"小丑" (xiǎo chǒu)	Will Pan	Will Pan	Clown	3:38
3.	"王者之聲" (wáng zhě zhī shēng)	Will Pan	Will Pan	The King's Speech	3:34
4.	"打呼" (dǎ hū; featuring Rainie Yang)	Will Pan	Will Pan	Snore	3:47
5.	"最後一支舞" (zuì hòu yī zhī wǔ)	Will Pan, Luke "Skywalker" Tsui	Will Pan	The Last Dance	4:18
6.	"一個人" (yī gè rén)	David Ke	Chen Wei Quan	Alone	4:01
7.	"Mr. Right"	Will Pan, Yiwei Wu (吳易緯)	Du Zhi Wen (都智文)		3:29
8.	"我最搖擺" (wǒ zuì yáo bǎi; sampling Harlem Yu's 我最搖擺)	Harlem Yu, Will Pan	Harlem Yu, Will Pan	I Am So Fresh	4:08
9.	"伊甸園" (yī diàn yuán)	Will Pan	Will Pan	Garden of Eden	3:16
10.	"柏拉圖的異想世界" (bó lā tú de yì xiǎng shì jiè)	Shao Jian Wei (紹建維), Will Pan	Will Pan	Plato's Fancy World	3:18
11.	"明天過後" (míng tiān guò hòu)	Will Pan	Will Pan	The Day After Tomorrow	4:34
Total length:					39:48

Crown & Clown — ITunes edition (bonus track)
No.	Title	Translation	Length
12.	"打呼(戲劇版)" (dǎ hū; featuring Rainie Yang)	Snore (alternative version)	3:39
Total length:			3:39

Crown & Clown — Deluxe edition (bonus DVD)
No.	Title	Translation	Length
1.	"小丑 MV"	Clown MV
2.	"打呼 MV"	Snore MV
3.	"王者之聲 MV"	The King's Speech MV
4.	"伊甸園 MV"	Garden of Eden MV
5.	"Mr. Right MV"
6.	"一個人MV"	Alone MV
7.	"小丑一鏡到底舞蹈版"	Clown dance version MV
8.	"王者丑生--十年有成特輯"	Bonus footage

Notes

- "打呼 (Snore)" is the opening theme song of Taiwanese television series Tie The Knot (媽咪的男朋友).

== Music videos ==
Song	Director	Release date	Notes	Ref
"小丑" (Clown)	Hong Won-ki	19 May 2014		
"打呼" (Snore)	One Two Free (自由發揮)	6 June 2014	Featuring Rainie Yang	
"王者之聲" (The King's Speech)	Bill Chia, Bounce (比爾賈)	27 June 2014		
"伊甸園" (Garden of Eden)	Liang Su (蘇益良)	25 July 2014		
"一個人" (Alone)	Jude Chen (陳映之)	8 August 2014		
"Mr. Right"	Jude Chen (陳映之)	8 August 2014		

== Charts ==
=== Album chart ===
Country	Chart	Peak position
Taiwan	Five Music Mandarin Chart (5大金榜)	1
Taiwan	G-Music Weekly Top 20 Combo Chart (風雲榜)	1
Taiwan	Chia Chia Record Mandarin Chart (佳佳唱片)	1
