= 808 (album) =

- 808 cover

Studio album 808 by Will Pan
- Released: 14 January 2011
- Genres: Mandopop, dance-pop, electropop
- Language: Mandarin
- Label: Universal Music Taiwan

Will Pan chronology
007 (2009)	808 (2011)	The Story of Billy (2012)

Alternative cover

808 is Taiwanese Mandopop artist Will Pan's (Chinese: 潘瑋柏) eighth studio album. It was released by Universal Music Taiwan on 14 January 2011. A second edition, 808 (Limited Edition) (CD+DVD) (808全球限量盤) was released on 11 February 2011 containing a bonus DVD with four music videos (Note: as listed in the Music Video section) and "全面通緝" (Totally Wanted) feature version (一刀未剪從[全面通緝]電影版).

The album debuted at number one on Taiwan's G-Music Weekly Top 20 Mandarin and Combo Charts; and Five Music Chart at week 3 with a percentage sales of 26.38%, 13.47%, and 26.93% respectively. It peaked at number one for three weeks on Mandarin and Combo Charts and two weeks on the Five Music Chart.

The tracks, "UUU" is listed on the Top 20 Gold Songs of the (January to June) 2011 Global Chinese Golden Chart.

== Background ==
808 was named after a model of drum machines that were considered popular in the 1980s. 808 was also derived from his birth date, August 1980 and it is also his 8th album. The music videos were released on the Universal Music Taiwan Channel on YouTube, the first lead track was, "Most Wanted" and the second lead track is, "U U U". Another two music videos for, "小小螞蟻" (Small Ant) and "觸動" (Touch) were also released. The former was featured in the Taiwanese drama, Ti Amo Chocolate's soundtrack, while the latter music video features Nichkhun of Korean boy band 2PM and it is a remix of "Pas de Deux (Shuang Ren Wu)". It also features the opening theme song, "我們都怕痛" (We Are All Afraid of Pain), of Taiwanese drama "Endless Love" (愛∞無限), starring Pan and Sandrine Pinna.

== Track listing ==
No.	Title	Lyrics	Music	Translation	Length
1.	"全面通緝 (Quánmiàn tōngjī)"	Eriky Lee	Will Pan, Leung Wing-Tai	Totally Wanted	3:27
2.	"未來愛情 (Wèilái àiqíng)"	NHL	Leung Wing-Tai	Future Love	4:55
3.	"觸動 (Chùdòng)"	Will Pan, Zhang Cheng Chun	Will Pan, Zhang Cheng Chun	Touch	3:58
4.	"U U U"	Eriky Lee	Will Pan		3:50
5.	"電腦 (Diànnǎo)" (Feat. Leung Wing Tai)	Leung Wing-Tai	Leung Wing-Tai	Computer	4:30
6.	"次世代 (Cì shìdài)"	Gary De Carlo, Dale Frashuer, Paul Leka, Will Pan	Will Pan	Next Century	3:28
7.	"我們都怕痛 (Wǒmen dōu pà tòng)"	Lin Zi Liang, Tina Wang	Lin Zi Liang	We Are All Afraid of Pain	4:37
8.	"小小螞蟻 (Xiǎo xiǎo mǎyǐ)"	Kevin Yi	Khalil Fong	Small Ant	3:49
9.	"我的電話 (Wǒ de diànhuà)"	Vincent Fang, Zeng Zhen Ru	Zhong Xu	My Phone	4:37
10.	"肩膀 (Jiānbǎng)"	Eriky Lee	Yi Jie Ji Xun	Shoulder	4:59
11.	"最終 (Zuìzhōng)"	Will Pan, Wu Yi Jian, Zeng Zhen Ru	Will Pan	In the End	4:57

== Music videos ==
- "全面通緝" (Most Wanted) MV
- "U U U" MV
- "小小螞蟻" (Small Ant) MV
- "觸動" (Touch) MV
- "我們都怕痛" (We Are All Afraid of Pain) MV
