= Wu Ha =

- Wu Ha cover

Studio album by Will Pan
- Released: 3 September 2004
- Genre: Mandopop
- Length: 38:11
- Language: Mandarin
- Label: Universal Music Taiwan

Will Pan chronology
Pass Me the Mic 我的麥克風 (2003)	Wu Ha (2004)	The Expert 高手 (2005)

Wu Ha is Taiwanese Mandopop artist Will Pan's third Mandarin studio album. It was released by Universal Music Taiwan on 3 September 2004. This album features a duet, "快樂崇拜" (Adoration to Happiness) with Taiwanese singer Angela Zhang, which was also released in her second album Aurora under label Linfair Records. The music and lyrics for "我讓你走了" (Letting You Go) were written by Taiwanese singer-songwriter Tank.

The track "Wu Ha" was listed at number 36 on Hit Fm Taiwan's Hit Fm Annual Top 100 Singles Chart (Hit-Fm年度百首單曲) for 2004.

== Release and promotion ==
Wu Ha was supposed to be released in June 2004 but was delayed until September. The pre-sale activity for the album started on September 15, 2004, with those who ordered receiving a limited edition poster and postcard.

While filming the music video for Wu Ha, Pan injured his knee. Despite the injury, he continued to dance hard in subsequent performances, causing it to worsen. Pan sought medical treatment after his performance at the Golden Eagle Festival, and he was advised to get knee surgery. Pan's agency halted all promotions for the album due to the event.

== Track listing ==
No.	Title	Lyrics	Music	Arrangement	Length
1.	"Wu Ha"	Albert Leung	K.Y.B	K.Y.B	3:47
2.	"快樂崇拜 feat. Angela Zhang" (Worship Happiness)	Will Pan, Albert Leung	Turtles (Note: Remake of "Come On" by Turtles.)	Ma Yu Fen	3:26
3.	"我讓你走了" (Letting You Go)	Tank	Tank	Terence Teo	4:09
4.	"聲東擊西" (East And West)	Wu Xiong	Blazin' Squad, Andrew Murray, Christian Ballard, Jane Vaughan, Obi Mhondera (Note: Remake of "Flip Reverse" by Blazin' Squad.)	Lin Yu Hsien	3:00
5.	"Kiss Night"	Ivy Neo	Cho Kyu Chan (Note: Remake of "Kiss" by Cho Kyu Chan.)	Martin Tang	4:07
6.	"我不識廣東話" (Don't Know Cantonese)	Luke "Skywalker" Tsui	Skot Suyama	Andrew Chen	2:59
7.	"Do That to Me One More Time"	Yu Kuang Chung	Toni Tennille	Terence Teo	4:35
8.	"圓心" (Round Heart)	Lin Yi Fen	Tan Jung Chien	Chiu Wang Tsang	3:57
9.	"太想愛你" (Want to Love You)	Kevin Yi	Wang Chih Ping	Wang Chih Ping	4:10
10.	"說到做到" (Say it Do it)	Kevin Yi	Kim Suk Chan (Note: Remake of "Come 2 Me My Love" by 5tion.)	Lee Jung Hoon	4:01

== Music video ==
1. "Wu Ha"
2. "快樂崇拜" (Adoration to Happiness) – feat Angela Chang
