= Pass Me the Mic =

- Pass Me the Mic cover

Studio album 我的麥克風 by Will Pan
- Released: 19 September 2003
- Genre: Mandopop
- Length: 37:08
- Language: Mandarin
- Label: Universal Music Taiwan

Will Pan chronology
Gecko Stroll (2002)	Pass Me the Mic (2003)	Wu Ha (2004)

Pass Me the Mic (Chinese: 我的麥克風; lit. 'my microphone') is Taiwanese Mandopop artist Will Pan's (Chinese: 潘瑋柏) second Mandarin studio album. It was released by Universal Music Taiwan on 19 September 2003. A second edition was released containing a VCD with live in concert tracks.

The track "愛上未來的你" (Love The Future You) is listed at number 50 on Hit Fm Taiwan's Hit Fm Annual Top 100 Singles Chart (Hit-Fm年度百首單曲) for 2003.

== Track listing ==
No.	Title	Lyrics	Music	Arrangement	Length
1.	"我的麥克風 (Note: Remake of "Double J" by Lee Jai-jin.)" (Pass Me the Mic)	Albert Leung	Kim Do Hoon	R2	3:38
2.	"咖哩辣椒 (Note: Remake of "Bow Wow" by jtL.)" (Curry Chili)	Will Pan, Tang Chih Chung, Albert Leung	Lee Jae Won	R2	4:05
3.	"愛上未來的妳" (Love the Future You)	Kevin Yi	Tan Jung Chien	Wang Chih Ping	4:01
4.	"我們都會錯 (Note: Remake of "Cold" by Lee Ki Chan.)" (We're Both Wrong)	Kevin Yi	Lee Ki Chan	Lin Yu Hsien	3:22
5.	"If I Can't Have You (Note: Remake of "If I Can't Have You" by the Bee Gees.)"	Will Pan, Kevin Yi	Maurice Gibb, Robin Gibb, Barry Gibb	B Jack	3:52
6.	"How Are You (Note: Remake of "How Are You" by Jewelry.)"	Will Pan	Disco Fighter	R2	3:30
7.	"非妳不可" (It's You)	Kevin Yi	Chen Hsin An	Chen Hsin An	3:33
8.	"有話直說" (Speak Truth)	Will Pan, Li Cho Hsiung	J Wu	J Wu	3:22
9.	"I Like You Like That (Note: Remake of "Baby I Like You Like That" by Se7en.)"	Kevin Yi	Perry	Perry	3:02
10.	"到時候再說" (Speak Later)	Hsu Shih Chen	Kuo Yi Fan	Chen Lei	4:25

== Bonus VCD ==
VCD - live in concert highlights

1. "我的麥克風" (Pass Me the Mic)
2. "Kiss Me 123"
