= Illi (album) =

Album by Wilber Pan

illi
- illi cover

Studio album 異類 by Will Pan
- Released: 11 August 2017
- Genre: Mandopop
- Language: Mandarin
- Label: Warner Music Taiwan, Alpha Sonic

Will Pan chronology
Crown & Clown 王者丑生 (2014)	illi (2017)	Mr. R&Beats 節奏先生 (2020)

Singles from illi
- 1. "Coming Home" Released: 13 July 2017; 2. "Close Encounter (第三類接觸)" Released: 3 August 2017

illi (traditional Chinese: 異類; simplified Chinese: 异类; pinyin: Yì Lèi) is the eleventh studio album by Taiwanese Mandopop artist Will Pan. It was released on 11 August 2017, by Warner Music Taiwan, his first release with the label.

The album's lead single, "Coming Home", was released on 13 July 2017.

== Track listing ==
illi — Standard edition
No.	Title	Lyrics	Music	Length
1.	"Coming Home"	Will Pan	Will Pan	3:55
2.	"Close Encounter" (第三類接觸; dì sān lèi jiē chù)	Will Pan	Will Pan	3:40
3.	"Go Hard" (硬鬧; yìng nào)	Will Pan; NESE	NESE; Will Pan	3:17
4.	"Dear Memories" (致青春; zhì qīng chūn)	Will Pan, Takey	Takey, Park Hae-il, KJUN	3:41
5.	"Numb" (啞巴; yǎ bā)	Will Pan	Will Pan	3:35
6.	"Never Loved" (根本沒愛過; gēn běn méi ài guò)	Will Pan, JerryC	JerryC	5:00
7.	"Crank" (鏘; qiāng)	Will Pan	Laker Chang (Future Sound), Denny Kang	3:24
8.	"Fight For You"	Will Pan	Matt Cab, RYUJA	4:00
9.	"No Reasons (feat. Orfila)" (稀罕沒理由 (feat. 吳昕); xī han méi lǐ yóu (feat. Wú Xīn))	Will Pan	Will Pan	3:59

Bonus tracks
No.	Title	Lyrics	Music	Length
10.	"Close Encounter (Lonely Version)" (第三類接觸 (寂寞版); dì sān lèi jiē chù (jì mò bǎn))	Will Pan	Will Pan	2:22
11.	"Slow Motion (feat. Gabrielle Guan)" (漫動作 (feat.關曉彤); màn dòng zuò (feat. Guān Xiǎo Tóng))	Will Pan, Wesbou Wu	Will Pan	4:27

== Music videos ==
Song	Director	Release date	Ref
"Coming Home"	Bboydry	19 July 2017	
"Close Encounter (第三類接觸)"		5 August 2017	
"Numb (啞巴)"	Ou Che-lun	2 September 2017	
"Dear Memories (致青春)"	Ocean Peng	29 September 2017	
