= The Expert (album) =

Gāoshǒu
- The Expert cover

Studio album 高手 by Will Pan
- Released: 8 July 2005
- Genre: Mandopop
- Length: 39:16
- Language: Mandarin
- Label: Universal Music Taiwan

Will Pan chronology
Wu Ha (2004)	Gāoshǒu (2005)	Freestyle Remix (2005)

Gāoshǒu (English "expert") (Chinese: 高手) is Taiwanese Mandopop artist Will Pan's (Chinese: 潘瑋柏) fourth Mandarin studio album. It was released by Universal Music Taiwan on 8 July 2005. A second edition The Expert (Celebration Version) (CD+DVD) was released on 23 August 2005 with a bonus DVD. The song "I Have to Love" was also included in her self titled debut studio album with the same name which was released on 20 October 2006 under the label Enjoy Music.

The tracks "誰是 MVP" (Who's MVP) and "不得不愛" (I Have to Love) with Zhang Xianzi were nominated for Top 10 Gold Songs at the Hong Kong TVB8 Awards, presented by television station TVB8, in 2005. "不得不愛" (I Have to Love) was an adaptation of "Y (Please Tell Me Why)" from the Korean band Free Style (프리스타일), released in 2004.

== Track listing ==
No.	Title	Lyrics	Music	Arrangement	Length
1.	"誰是MVP" (Who Is MVP)	Will Pan	Will Pan	Chen Lei	3:52
2.	"不得不愛 feat. Zhang Xianzi" (I Have to Love)	Will Pan, Albert Leung	Choi Ji Ho (Note: Remake of 《Y (Please Tell Me Why)》 by Free Style.)	Free Style	4:41
3.	"高手" (The Expert)	Tang Jung Chien, Fang Chun Hui	Tang Jung Chien, Yi Ta Li	Blue J	3:50
4.	"禪舞不二" (The One and Only Zen Dance)	Isaac Chen	Oh Hoon (Note: Remake of song 《Look At Me》 by Lee Jung.)	Ko Young Jo	3:47
5.	"不要忘了我" (Don't Forget Me)	Will Pan, Robbie Fang	Lee Se Jin (Note: Remake of 《After a day》 by JNC)	Ko Young Jo	3:32
6.	"Baby Bye"	Jennifer Hsu	Chen Jun Da	Chen Lei	4:02
7.	"決戰鬥室" (Battle Room)	Will Pan	Will Pan	Blue J	3:07
8.	"跟我走吧" (Leave With Me)	Jennifer Hsu	JJ Lin	Terence Teo	3:49
9.	"一指神功" (Android)	Will Pan, Yi Ta Li	Yi Ta Li	Blue J	3:42
10.	"愛很容易" (Love Is Easy)	Will Pan, Yi Ta Li, Fang Chun Hui	Chen Lei	Chen Lei	4:49

== Bonus DVD ==
The Expert (Celebration Version)

1. Back 4 More
2. About "誰是 MVP" (Who's MVP)
3. "誰是 MVP" (Who's MVP) MV
4. About "不得不愛" (I Have to Love)
5. "不得不愛" (I Have to Love) MV
6. About "高手" (The Expert)
7. "高手" (The Expert) MV
