= 007 (Will Pan album) =

- 007 cover

Studio album 零零七 by Will Pan
- Released: May 22, 2009
- Genre: Mandopop, Rap
- Language: Mandarin
- Label: Universal Music Taiwan

Will Pan chronology
Will's Future (2008)	007 (2009)	808 (2011)

007 (Chinese: 零零七) is Taiwanese Mandopop artist Will Pans' (Chinese: 潘瑋柏) seventh Mandarin studio album. It was released by Universal Music Taiwan on 22 May 2009, featuring 11 new studio tracks. A second edition, 007 (Commemorate Edition) (CD+DVD), was released on 7 September 2009 with a DVD containing a 46 minute Will Pan television series special containing three music videos, behind-the-scene footages and interview.

The lead track "Be with You" is a duet with American R&B singer Akon, a track from his third studio album Freedom. The music video for the other lead track "無重力" (Weightless) features Taiwanese actress Chen Kuangyi. The music video for "雙人舞" (Pas de Deux) is directed by Chang Jae Hyuk and features South Korean actress Lee Da-hae.

"Be With You" features Akon is listed at number 51 on Hit Fm Taiwan's Hit Fm Annual Top 100 Singles Chart (Hit-Fm年度百首單曲) for 2009. The tracks, "Be With You" won one of the Songs of the Year and "雙人舞" (Pas de Deux) won one of the three Best Original Songs at the 2009 Metro Radio Mandarin Music Awards presented by Hong Kong radio station Metro Info.

== Track listing ==
1. "雙人舞" Shuāng Rén Wǔ (Pas de Deux)
2. "限量發行" Xiàn Liàng Fā Xíng (Limited Edition)
3. "無重力" Wú Zhòng Lì (Weightless)
4. "Be With You" – feat Akon
5. "愛的歌" Ài De Gē (Love Song)
6. "寂屋出租" Jì Wū Chū Zū (Silence Room for Rent)
7. "自我意識" Zì Wǒ Yì Shí (Self-Awareness)
8. "親愛的" Qīn Ài De (My Dear)
9. "Everytime's Goodtime"
10. "怎麼著" Zěn Me Zhu (How)
11. "Don't Wanna Say Goodbye"

DVD – 007 (Commemorate Edition)

Will Pan television series special (collectible edition), 46 min 34 s

- "Be With You" MV
- "雙人舞" (Pas de Deux) MV – directed by Chang Jae Hyuk and features Lee Da Hae
- "無重力" (Weightless) MV – feat Chen Kuangyi
- Behind-the-scene footages: MV outtakes, Will's travelogs: Honduras and Korea
- Interview with Will's father

== Music video ==
- "雙人舞" (Pas de Deux) MV – directed by Chang Jae Hyuk and features Lee Da Hae
- "無重力" (Weightless) MV – feat Chen Kuangyi
- "Be With You" MV – feat Akon
- "親愛的" MV –
- "寂屋出租" MV –
