= Tie the Knot (TV series) =

2014 Taiwanese television series

- Promotional poster
- Also known as: Mommy's Boyfriend
- 媽咪的男朋友
- Genre: Romance, Comedy
- Created by: Sanlih E-Television
- Written by: Jung Han-wen (鄭涵文), Yongfang Huang (黃永芳), Wu Xiangying (吳香穎), Chen Pei Yin (陳佩吟)
- Directed by: Xu Pei Shan (許珮珊)
- Starring: Cheryl Yang 楊謹華; Nylon Chen 陳乃榮; Kingone Wang 王傳一
- Opening theme: "打呼" (Snore) by Will Pan and Rainie Yang
- Ending theme: "每一次戀愛" (Mei Yi Ci Lian Ai) by Rachel Liang
- Country of origin: Republic of China (Taiwan)
- Original language: Mandarin
- No. of series: 1
- No. of episodes: 70

Production
- Producer: Liu Qiu Ping (劉秋平)
- Production location: Taiwan
- Running time: 60 minutes
- Production companies: Sanlih E-Television 三立電視; Golden Bloom Production Co., Ltd. 金牌風華影像製作公司; XieLi Video Production Co., Ltd. 協利影像製作股份有限公司

Original release
- Network: SETTV
- Release: 28 May – 2 September 2014

Related
- Fabulous 30; Love Cheque Charge

Tie the Knot (Chinese: 媽咪的男朋友, literally, "Mommy's Boyfriend") is a 2014 Taiwanese romantic-comedy television series. The television drama was produced by Sanlih E-Television (SETTV), with Cheryl Yang as the female lead and Nylon Chen and Kingone Wang as the male leads. Shooting began on May 9, 2014, and the first episode aired on May 28, 2014 on SETTV.

== Plot ==
Li Xiao Mei (Cheryl Yang) is a career woman who has a new boss, Huang Shi Jia (Nylon Chen), at the wedding-planning firm where she works. Ironically, she finds it difficult to find a man to marry because of past experiences with her father, but she has had a child using donated sperm and is raising the girl as a single parent. Wedding gown designer Liu Zi Jun (Kingone Wang) and her boss Shi Jia start to fall in love with her and each tries to win her over.

== Cast ==
Main cast

- Cheryl Yang (楊謹華) as Li Xiao Mei (厲曉玫)
- Nylon Chen (陳乃榮) as Huang Shi Jia (黃世家)
- Kingone Wang (王傳一) as Liu Zi Jun (留子俊)
- Dou Dou (豆豆) as Li Hao Hao (厲好好)
- Tao Man Man (陶嫚曼) as Huang Shi Ting (黃世婷)
- Sun Qi Jun (孫其君) as Ou Ping Kang (歐品康)

Minor cast

- Zhang Pei Hua (張佩華) as Huang Hong Yuen (黃鴻元)
- Yang Li-yin (楊麗音) as Wang Yi Qin (王憶琴)
- Chen Zhi Qiang (陳志強) as Ma Lian Chuan (馬兩傳)
- Liu Yu Jing (劉宇菁) as You Zhi Lin (尤芷琳)
- Zeng Wei Lin (曾威菱) as Xie Ya Fei (謝雅妃)
- Guan Jing Zong (管謹宗) as Manager v總經理)
- Di Zhi Jie (狄志杰) as Li Xiao Long (厲曉龍)
- Yao Han Yi (瑤涵沂) as Zhu Jia Zhen (朱桂珍)
- Shen Hai Rong (沈海蓉) as Song Jin Yu (宋金玉)
- Shen Meng-sheng (沈孟生) as Li Cheng Gong 厲成功
- Amanda Chou (周曉涵) as Rima

== Production ==
The series marked the first time that singer Nylon Chen had landed a leading role. In preparation for his acting break, Chen stepped up his exercise regime, running and training in the gym, as well as dieting to improve his fitness.

Cheryl Yang returned to SETTV after four years away from the network; she had appeared in a succession of female lead roles on other networks since her career break on My Queen in 2009. She again took on the role of a mother, having previously starred as a single mother in the 2012 series Once Upon a Love.

The series mainly filmed at Minsheng Pavilion (民生館進行劇中場地) and Amazing Hall (晶宴會館) in Taiwan; these locations were used as banquet halls and wedding reception venues for the characters.

== Broadcast ==
Network	Country/Location	Airing Date	Timeslot
SETTV	Taiwan	May 28, 2014	Mondays to Fridays, 8pm to 10pm
Eastern Integrated Taiwan	Taiwan	May 28, 2014	Mondays to Fridays, 10pm to 11pm
Astro Shuang Xing	Malaysia	June 12, 2014	Mondays to Fridays, 6:30pm to 7:30pm
VV Drama	Singapore	July 1, 2014	Mondays to Fridays, 7:00pm to 8:00pm
Amarin TV	Thailand	January 24, 2015	Mondays to Fridays, 2:00pm to 3:00pm

== Soundtrack ==
Tie the Knot

Soundtrack album by Various Artists
- Released: September 5, 2014
- Genre: Mandopop
- Language: Mandarin
- Label: Universal Music Taiwan

The Tie the Knot Original Soundtrack (媽咪的男朋友 電視原聲帶) CD was released on September 5, 2014 by Universal Music Taiwan. It contains 12 songs performed by various artists, including five original songs and seven instrumental versions. The opening theme song is "打呼" or "Snore" by Will Pan and Rainie Yang, while the closing theme song, "每一次戀愛" or "Every Time I Fall In Love", is by Rachel Liang.

=== Track listing ===
No.	Title	Lyrics	Music	Singer	Length
1.	"Snore" (打呼)	Will Pan	Will Pan	Will Pan and Rainie Yang
2.	"Every Time I Fall In Love" (每一次戀愛)	林夕	Chen Wei Ling (陳韋伶)	Rachel Liang
3.	"Bump Bump" (碰碰)	Guan Qi Yuan (管啟源)	Paul Drew, Greig Watts, Pete Barringer, Christopher Wortley	Cyndi Wang
4.	"Exclusively For You" (專屬於你)	Linianhe (李念和) and Will Pan	Will Pan	Will Pan
5.	"After I Say I Love You" (說愛妳以後)	Nylon Chen	Nylon Chen	Nylon Chen
6.	"Snore" (兩小無猜版 version)		Will Pan	Instrumental
7.	"Snore" (調皮幽默版)		Will Pan	Instrumental
8.	"Every Time I Fall In Love" (痛徹心扉版Instrumental)		Chen Wei Ling (陳韋伶)	Instrumental
9.	"Every Time I Fall In Love" (浪漫愛情版)		Chen Wei Ling (陳韋伶)	Instrumental
10.	"Bump Bump" (愛意親密版 version)		Paul Drew, Greig Watts, Pete Barringer, Christopher Wortley	Instrumental
11.	"Bump Bump" (暖心幸福版 version)		Paul Drew, Greig Watts, Pete Barringer, Christopher Wortley	Instrumental
12.	"An Indescribable Taste" (Guitar Solo version)		Chen Qi Yue (陳啟樂)	Instrumental

== Episode ratings ==
The pilot episode of Tie the Knot ranked fifth amongst the television shows airing in the same time slot. It went up to the fourth spot on the day the second episode aired, and stayed at that spot until the end of the series, with the exception of the tenth week. The total viewer average garnered a rating of 1.22 percent. Its drama competitors were SETTV's Ordinary Love; FTV's Dragon Dance; TTV's Monga Woman, Super M, and Sun After The Rain; CTV's Happiness on the Moon and Perfect Couple; CTS' Unique Flavor and 綜藝王見王; and DaAi TV's 幸福魔法師, 頂坡角上的家, and 情牽萬里. The viewers survey was conducted by AGB Nielsen.

Tie the Knot Ratings
Air Date	Episode	Average Ratings (per week)	Rank
May 28, 2014	1	1.32	5
May 29, 2014	2	1.32	5
May 30, 2014	3	1.32	5
June 2, 2014	4	1.28	4
June 3, 2014	5	1.28	4
June 4, 2014	6	1.28	4
June 5, 2014	7	1.28	4
June 6, 2014	8	1.28	4
June 9, 2014	9	1.35	4
June 10, 2014	10	1.35	4
June 11, 2014	11	1.35	4
June 12, 2014	12	1.35	4
June 13, 2014	13	1.35	4
June 16, 2014	14	1.25	4
June 17, 2014	15	1.25	4
June 18, 2014	16	1.25	4
June 19, 2014	17	1.25	4
June 20, 2014	18	1.25	4
June 23, 2014	19	1.24	4
June 24, 2014	20	1.24	4
June 25, 2014	21	1.24	4
June 26, 2014	22	1.24	4
June 27, 2014	23	1.24	4
June 30, 2014	24	1.29	4
July 1, 2014	25	1.29	4
July 2, 2014	26	1.29	4
July 3, 2014	27	1.29	4
July 4, 2014	28	1.29	4
July 7, 2014	29	1.20	4
July 8, 2014	30	1.20	4
July 9, 2014	31	1.20	4
July 10, 2014	32	1.20	4
July 11, 2014	33	1.20	4
July 14, 2014	34	1.13	4
July 15, 2014	35	1.13	4
July 16, 2014	36	1.13	4
July 17, 2014	37	1.13	4
July 18, 2014	38	1.13	4
July 21, 2014	39	1.20	4
July 22, 2014	40	1.20	4
July 23, 2014	41	1.20	4
July 24, 2014	42	1.20	4
July 25, 2014	43	1.20	4
July 28, 2014	44	1.06	5
July 29, 2014	45	1.06	5
July 30, 2014	46	1.06	5
July 31, 2014	47	1.06	5
August 1, 2014	48	1.06	5
August 4, 2014	49	1.06	4
August 5, 2014	50	1.06	4
August 6, 2014	51	1.06	4
August 7, 2014	52	1.06	4
August 8, 2014	53	1.06	4
August 11, 2014	54	1.11	4
August 12, 2014	55	1.11	4
August 13, 2014	56	1.11	4
August 14, 2014	57	1.11	4
August 15, 2014	58	1.11	4
August 18, 2014	59	1.32	4
August 19, 2014	60	1.32	4
August 20, 2014	61	1.32	4
August 21, 2014	62	1.32	4
August 22, 2014	63	1.32	4
August 25, 2014	64	1.18	4
August 26, 2014	65	1.18	4
August 27, 2014	66	1.18	4
August 28, 2014	67	1.18	4
August 29, 2014	68	1.18	4
September 1, 2014	69	1.43	4
September 2, 2014	70	1.43	4
Average Ratings		1.22	

== Awards ==
Year	Ceremony	Category	Result
2014	Sanlih Drama Awards	Best Ladykiller Award; Zhang Pei Hua (張佩華)	Nominated
2014	Sanlih Drama Awards	Best Actress Award; Cheryl Yang	Nominated
2014	Sanlih Drama Awards	Audience Choice Award for Most Popular Drama	Nominated
