= Mr. R&Beats =

2020 studio album by Will Pan

- Mr. R&Beats cover

Studio album 節奏先生 by Will Pan
- Released: 10 September 2020
- Genre: Mandopop
- Language: Mandarin
- Label: Warner Music Taiwan, Alpha Sonic
- Producer: Jeremy Ji, Will Pan, Tha Aristocrats, Mr Danny

Will Pan chronology
illi 異類 (2017)	Mr. R&Beats (2020)

Singles from Mr. R&Beats
- 1. "To Be Loved" Released: 15 July 2020; 2. "Second Option" Released: 31 July 2020

Mr. R&Beats (Chinese: 節奏先生; pinyin: Jié Zòu Xiān Shēng; lit. 'Mr. Rhythm') is the twelfth studio album by Taiwanese Mandopop artist Will Pan. Originally scheduled for 14 August 2020, the album's release was postponed to 10 September 2020, for undisclosed reasons. Mr. R&Beats is Pan's second album release under Warner Music Taiwan. Most of the album was produced by Jeremy Ji and Pan himself, while other producers included Tha Aristocrats and Mr Danny.

The album's lead single, "To Be Loved", was digitally released on 15 July 2020, following which the second lead single, "Second Option", was digitally released on 31 July 2020.

== Promotion ==
An online concert was held on 20 September 2020 at 8 p.m. UTC+08:00 to support the album. It was broadcast on Line Music, Joox and NetEase Music.

== Track listing ==
No.	Title	Writer(s)	Producer(s)	Length
1.	"Mr. R&Beats" (節奏先生; jié zòu xiān shēng)	Will Pan, Hyuk Shin, Blair Taylor	Jeremy Ji, Will Pan	3:36
2.	"Babylon" (巴比倫; bā bǐ lún)	Will Pan, Chaz Jackson, Dashawn “Happie” White	Jeremy Ji, Will Pan, Tha Aristocrats	3:41
3.	"Second Option" (第二順位; dì èr shùn wèi)	Will Pan, Hyuk Shin, Mrey, Joseph Tilley	Jeremy Ji, Will Pan	3:59
4.	"To Be Loved"	Will Pan, August Rigo Klein, Trevor David Brown, Daniel Stephen Campfield, Matt Wayne	Jeremy Ji, Will Pan	3:27
5.	"Love You 3000 (Solo Version)" (愛你3000 - Solo Version; Ài nǐ 3000)	Will Pan, Boom, Sean T	Jeremy Ji, Will Pan	4:14
6.	"Don't Kill My Vibe (feat. Sibel Redžep)"	Will Pan, Chaz Jackson, Dashawn “Happie” White, Sibel Redžep	Jeremy Ji, Will Pan, Tha Aristocrats	2:55
7.	"Kisses"	Will Pan, Chaz Jackson, Dashawn “Happie” White, Sibel Redžep, Michael Jimines	Jeremy Ji, Will Pan, Tha Aristocrats	3:00
8.	"Faded" (飛; fēi)	Will Pan, August Rigo, William Zaire Simmons, Trevor David Brown	Jeremy Ji, Will Pan	2:47
9.	"Holy Grail" (天生尤物; tiān shēng yóu wù)	Will Pan, Luke B.T. Tsui	Jeremy Ji, Will Pan	3:21
10.	"Love You Hate You" (有愛又恨; yǒu ài yòu hèn)	Will Pan, Jeremy Ji	Jeremy Ji, Will Pan	3:40
11.	"Moonlight (feat. Tia Ray)" (Moonlight (feat. 袁婭維); Moonlight (feat. Yuán Yà Wéi))	Will Pan, Dashawn “Happie” White, Chaz Jackson, Sibel Redžep	Tha Aristocrats	3:11
12.	"Love You 3000 (feat. Boom & Sean T)" (愛你 3000 (feat. 黃旭 & 肖恩恩); Ài nǐ 3000 (feat. Huáng Xù & Xiào ēn ēn))	Will Pan, Sean T, Boom	Will Pan, Mr Danny	4:15
13.	"Second Option (acoustic version)" (第二順位 (寂他版); dì èr shùn wèi (jì tā bǎn))	Will Pan, Hyuk Shin, Mrey, Joseph Tilley	Jeremy Ji, Will Pan	4:00
14.	"Moonlight (feat. Tia Ray) (Chinese Version)" (Moonlight (feat. 袁婭維) - 中文版; Moonlight (feat. Yuán Yà Wéi) - zhōng wén bǎn)	Will Pan, Dashawn “Happie” White, Chaz Jackson, Sibel Redžep	Tha Aristocrats	3:12

== Music videos ==
Song	Director	Release date	Ref
"To Be Loved"	Zen Huang	18 July 2020	
"Second Option" ("第二順位")	Ares Wu	31 July 2020	
"Babylon" ("巴比倫")	Birdy Nio	15 September 2020	

== Charts ==
Chart performance for Mr. R&Beats
Album chart (2020)	Peak position
Five Music Mandarin Chart	1
G-Music Mandarin Chart	1
Chia Chia Mandarin Chart	2
Kuang Nan Mandarin Chart	5
Books.com.tw Weekly Mandarin Chart	11
