= The Story of Billy =

- The Story of Billy cover

Studio album 24個比利 by Will Pan
- Released: 31 August 2012
- Genre: Mandopop
- Language: Mandarin
- Label: Universal Music Taiwan

Will Pan chronology
808 (2011)	The Story of Billy (2012)	Crown & Clown (2014)

The Story of Billy (Chinese: 24個比利; pinyin: 24 gè bǐ lì) is Taiwanese Mandopop artist Will Pan's (Chinese: 潘瑋柏) ninth studio album. It was released by Universal Music Taiwan on 31 August 2012. The pre-ordering of the album began on 10 August 2012 in Taiwan and included a limited edition Rubik's Cube with each pre-order purchase. The album marked the comeback of Pan to the music scene, 19 months after the release of 808 in January 2011.

A second edition, The Story of Billy (Flagship Edition) (CD+DVD) (24個比利 冠軍旗艦影音版) was released on 9 October 2012, which contains a remix version of "The Story of Billy (24個比利)" and a bonus DVD with six music videos. The version released in Taiwan included an entry pass to "Will Pan Absolutely Yours Celebration Concert" (潘瑋柏「專屬於你」慶功演唱會) held on 13 October at Neo19 in Taipei.

The album's title was inspired by The Minds of Billy Milligan, a 1981 non-fiction novel written by Daniel Keyes about the true account of multiple personality serial criminal Billy Milligan. It is a breakthrough for Pan as a songwriter with contribution of six songs on the album, including the title track "The Story of Billy (24個比利)".

== MV and promotion ==
The two lead singles of the album "Baby Tonight" and "Don't Wanna Wake Up" were both released on 24 July 2012. "Baby Tonight" is written and composed by Pan himself, "Don't Wanna Wake Up" is the Mandarin version of "Baby Tonight" and the lyrics is penned by Taiwan lyricist Yao Ruo Long. On 25 July 2012, the music videos of "Baby Tonight" and "Don't Wanna Wake Up" were released on Pan's official YouTube video channel.

After the debut of two teasers, the official music video of the title track "The Story of Billy" directed by Korean music video director Hong Won-ki (Zanybros) and MV concept contributed by Will himself, was released on 7 August 2012, a day earlier than the initial date announced. The move was due to the music video being leaked on video sharing sites by unknown sources and Will expressed his disappointment on the incident at his official Facebook page.

On 22 August 2012, the dance version music video of "The Story of Billy" was released, after the initial version garnered more than 530,000 hits on Will Pan's official YouTube channel as of 21 August.

A press conference was held on 28 August to launch the album. Will played his new single "Forgetting The Hug" on piano and also performed "The Story of Billy". The music video of "Extravagant March" starring Taiwanese singer Jeremy Ji, was released on the same day, and the main theme of the music video was inspired by the love story of Will's parents.

In conjunction with the album promotion, Will became the first Chinese celebrity to broadcast his life snippets publicly on 24-hour Google+ Hangouts On-Air from 28 August to 29 August. The highlights of the Google+ Hangouts were later uploaded onto Will's official YouTube channel for viewing.

The music video of "Forgetting The Hug" starring Ann Hsu, premiered at MTV Taiwan and Pan's YouTube channel on 13 September. On 3 October 2012, a music video for the mid-tempo R&B song "Absolutely Yours" was released on his YouTube channel and Channel V. The song is an insert song for drama series Dong Men Si Shao (東門四少) and the music video featured Taiwanese model-singer Cai Huang Ru (Dou Hua Mei).

The second edition of The Story of Billy was released on 9 October which contains a remix version of "The Story of Billy" (24個比利) and a bonus DVD with six music videos. Will held a celebration concert on 13 October at Neo19 in Taipei which was broadcast live on his YouTube channel. He performed all the songs from The Story of Billy including a piano rendition of "24個比利 (The Story of Billy)" and a medley of his popular songs from previous albums. Singer-actress Cyndi Wang made a guest appearance at the concert and shared a dance with Pan during the song "華麗進行曲 (Extravagant March)".

The music video of the track "What Can I Do" premiered at QQ.com on 12 October and was released on Pan's YouTube channel on 13 October.

On 29 October, an excerpt from Will's Taipei celebration concert was released as the music video of "釋放自己 (Release Yourself)" on his YouTube Channel, and the electro hip-hop tune is the theme song of his third concert tour which kicked off in November 2012.

== Reception ==
The album debuted at number one on Taiwan's G-Music Weekly Top 20 Mandarin and Combo Charts at week 35; and Five Music Chart at week 36 with a percentage sales of 43.56%, 30.07%, and 16.68% respectively. According to Universal Music Taiwan, the album achieved 30,000 pre-orders, and the first batch of 40,000 copies were all sold out within a day of its release in Taiwan.

The title track "The Story of Billy (24個比利)" debuted at number one on MTV Taiwan Mandarin Chart and Taiwan Hito Mandarin Chart for the week of 25 August to 31 August 2012, and 27 August to 2 September 2012 respectively. The song stayed at number one for two weeks on MTV Taiwan Mandarin Chart.

The lead single "Don't Wanna Wake Up (不想醒來)" debuted at the ninth position on the 623rd edition of Global Chinese Music Chart (全球華語歌曲排行榜) and topped the chart for one week on the 625th edition. The song debuted at number eight on the 137th edition of Global Chinese Golden Chart (全球流行音樂金榜) and reached its highest position at number three on the 140th and 141st editions of the chart.

The third single "Extravagant March (華麗進行曲)" was at number one position for two weeks on MTV Taiwan Mandarin Chart. The song also topped Taiwan UFO Network Radio Chart (幽浮勁碟排行榜) on the 662nd week.

The ballad "Forgetting The Hug (忘記擁抱)" was the number one song for the 663rd week of Taiwan UFO Network Radio Chart and number one for two weeks on Taiwan Hito Mandarin Chart.

The album is listed as the 8th best selling album on Taiwan's G-Music chart in 2012.

== Track listing ==
No.	Title	Lyrics	Music	Arrangement	Length
1.	"24個比利" (The Story of Billy)	Will Pan	Will Pan	Blue J	4:51
2.	"現場直播" (Live Broadcast)	Wesbou Wu	Christian Rabb, Kristoffer Sjökvist, Albin Loán, Dino Medanhodzic, Joacim Hammarström	Starr Chen	3:32
3.	"What Can I Do"	Wesbou Wu	NESE	Elisa Lin, NESE	3:55
4.	"忘記擁抱" (Forgetting the Hug)	David Ke, Alex Zhang Jian	Alex Zhang Jian	Yu Gin Yen	4:17
5.	"給力" (Get It)	Luke Tsui	Terrytyelee	Terrytyelee	3:59
6.	"釋放自己" (Release Yourself)	Will Pan	Will Pan	Blue J	3:36
7.	"華麗進行曲" (Extravagant March)	Will Pan	Will Pan, Jon Hendricks	Blue J	4:17
8.	"不想醒來" (Don't Wanna Wake Up)	Daryl Yao	Will Pan	Blue J	3:36
9.	"那一天" (That Day)	Will Pan	Derek Jin	Kang You Wei	3:43
10.	"專屬於你" (Absolutely Yours)	Will Pan, Eriky Lee	Will Pan	Blue J	4:17
11.	"Baby Tonight"	Will Pan	Will Pan	Blue J	3:34

== Bonus Track/DVD ==
Bonus Track - The Story of Billy (CD+DVD) Flagship Edition

1. "24個比利 Remix" (The Story of Billy SupaCalaFuturistic X FlightSch Remix)

DVD - music videos - The Story of Billy (CD+DVD) Flagship Edition

1. "不想醒來" (Don't Wanna Wake Up) MV
2. "24個比利 劇情版" (The Story of Billy Story version) MV
3. "24個比利 舞蹈版" (The Story of Billy Dance Version) MV
4. "華麗進行曲" (Extravagant March) MV (feat. Jeremy Ji)
5. "忘記擁抱" (Forgetting The Hug) MV (feat. Ann Hsu)
6. "專屬於你" (Absolutely Yours) MV (feat. Cai Huang Ru a.k.a. Dou Hua Mei)

== Music videos ==
- "Baby tonight" MV
- "不想醒來" (Don't Wanna Wake Up) MV
- "24個比利 劇情版" (The Story of Billy Story Version) MV
- "24個比利 舞蹈版" (The Story of Billy Dance Version) MV
- "華麗進行曲" (Extravagant March) MV (feat. Jeremy Ji)
- "忘記擁抱" (Forgetting The Hug) MV (feat. Ann Hsu)
- "專屬於你" (Absolutely Yours) MV (feat. Cai Huang Ru a.k.a. Dou Hua Mei)
- "What Can I Do" MV
- "釋放自己" (Release Yourself) MV (excerpt from Taipei celebration concert)

== Chart ==
=== Album chart ===
Chart Name	Debut Position	Week# / Week Dates of Peak Position	Peak Position	Percentage of Album Sales at Peak
Five Music Taiwan; 5大金榜	#1	#36 / 31 August - 6 September 2012	#1	16.68%
G-Music Mandarin Chart, Taiwan 風雲榜 (華語榜)	#1	#35 / 31 August - 6 September 2012	#1	43.56%
G-Music Combo Chart, Taiwan 風雲榜 (綜合榜)	#1	#35 / 31 August - 6 September 2012	#1	30.07%
