= Gecko Stroll =

- Gecko Stroll cover

Studio album 壁虎漫步 by Will Pan
- Released: 20 December 2002
- Genre: Mandopop
- Length: 38:02
- Language: Mandarin
- Label: Universal Music Taiwan

Will Pan chronology
Gecko Stroll (2002)	Pass Me the Mic 我的麥克風 (2003)

Gecko Stroll (Chinese: 壁虎漫步) is Taiwanese Mandopop artist Will Pan's (Chinese: 潘瑋柏) debut Mandarin solo studio album. It was released by Universal Music Taiwan on 20 December 2002. A second edition was released which includes a VCD with 6 MV's.

The track "Kiss Me 123" is listed at number 85 on Hit Fm Taiwan's Hit Fm Annual Top 100 Singles Chart (Hit-Fm年度百首單曲) for 2003.

== Track listing ==
No.	Title	Lyrics	Music	Arrangement	Length
1.	"壁虎漫步" (Gecko Stroll)	Vincent Fang	Teddy (Note: Credited as the song is a remake of song "mother" by 1TYM)	Teddy	3:36
2.	"Tell Me"	Will Pan, Kevin Yi	Lee Hyun Do (Note: Remake of "tell me" by Jinusean)	Lee Hyun Do	3:51
3.	"Kiss Me 123"	Ivy Neo	Huang Yi	Lin Yu Hsien	3:18
4.	"Just When I Need You Most"	Will Pan, Kevin Yi	Randy Vanwarmcr	Wang Chih Ping	4:33
5.	"Good Love"	Will Pan, Kevin Yi	Perry (Note: Remake of song "good love" by 1TYM)	C&C	3:41
6.	"我不怕" (I'm Not Afraid)	Kevin Yi	Hu Yan Bin	B Jack	3:42
7.	"X Spy"	Vincent Fang	Wasabi Ice Cream	Wasabi Ice Cream	3:27
8.	"站在你這邊" (Stand by Your Side)	Vincent Fang	Jay Chou	Lin Yu Hsien	4:35
9.	"學不會" (Can't Learn)	Will Pan, Vincent Fang	Anson Hu	Lin Yu Hsien	3:31
10.	"特別來賓" (Special Guest (with Evonne Hsu))	Kevin Yi	Terry Lee	Terry Lee	3:48

== Music video ==
- "壁虎漫步" (Gecko Stroll) MV
- "Tell Me" MV
- "Just When I Needed You Most" MV
- "我不怕" (I'm Not Afraid) MV
- "Kiss Me 123" MV
- "Good Love" MV
- "X Spy" MV
- "站在你這邊" (By My Side) MV
- "學不會" (Can Not Learn) MV
