= Around the World (Will Pan album) =

- Around The World cover

Studio album 反轉地球 by Will Pan
- Released: 23 June 2006
- Genre: Mandopop, Hip-Hop, Rap
- Length: 41:40
- Language: Mandarin
- Label: Universal Music Taiwan

Will Pan chronology
Freestyle Remix (2005)	Around the World (2006)	Play It Cool (2007)

Around the World (Chinese: 反轉地球; pinyin: Fan Zhuan Di Qiu) is Taiwanese Mandopop artist Will Pan's fifth Mandarin studio album. It was released by Universal Music Taiwan on 23 June 2006.

It features 11 new studio tracks with 2 duets: "戴上我的愛" (Wear My Love) with Wang Luo Dan and "我想更慬你" (I Wanna Understand You More) with Su Rui, the one who previously sings "Any Empty Wine Bottles for Sale?" from Papa, Can You Hear Me Sing. A second edition Around the World (CD+DVD) was released on 3 August 2006 with a DVD containing four music videos. (Note: as listed in the Music Video section)

The track "反轉地球" (Around The World) was nominated for Top 10 Gold Songs at the Hong Kong TVB8 Awards, presented by television station TVB8, in 2006.

== Track listing ==
No.	Title	Lyrics	Music	Arrangement	Length
1.	"反轉地球" (Around The World)	Will Pan, Yi Ta Li	Eriky Lee, Yi Ta Li	Eriky Lee	3:09
2.	"著迷" (Mesmerised)	Guan Wei Tang	Guan Wei Tang	Guan Wei Tang	3:34
3.	"戴上我的愛 feat. Wang Luo Dan" (Wear My Love)	Will Pan, Eriky Lee	Terry Lee	Rhythm and Elisha Lee	4:25
4.	"機會" (Chances)	Vincent Fang	Chung Tso Hung (G-Power)	Tsai Ko Chun	3:54
5.	"來電" (Incoming Call)	Will Pan	Will Pan	Blue J	3:37
6.	"我想更慬你 feat. Su Rui" (I Wanna Understand You More)	Will Pan, Daryl Yao	Eriky Lee	Eriky Lee	4:28
7.	"無所不在" (Everywhere)	Will Pan, Daryl Yao, Yi Ta Li	Will Pan	Chen Lei	3:24
8.	"街頭詩人 feat. Blue J" (Street Poet)	Yi Ta Li, T.J	Blue J	Blue J	4:27
9.	"戲如人生" (Life on Stage)	Vincent Fang	Wang Chih Ping	TAZ	3:42
10.	"謝謝" (Thank You)	Chen Yu Ting	Will Pan	Chiu Wang Tsang	4:03
11.	"Pan@sonic feat. Jim Ho, Lan Bo, Blue J" (Thank You)	Will Pan, Jim Ho, Blue J	Blue J	Blue J	2:50

== Music video ==
1. "反轉地球" (Around The World) MV
2. "謝謝" (Thank You) MV
3. "戴上我的愛" (Wear My Love) MV
4. "來電" (Incoming Call) MV
5. "我想更懂你" MV
6. "著迷" MV
7. "機會" MV
