= Andrea Chen =

Taiwanese actress and model

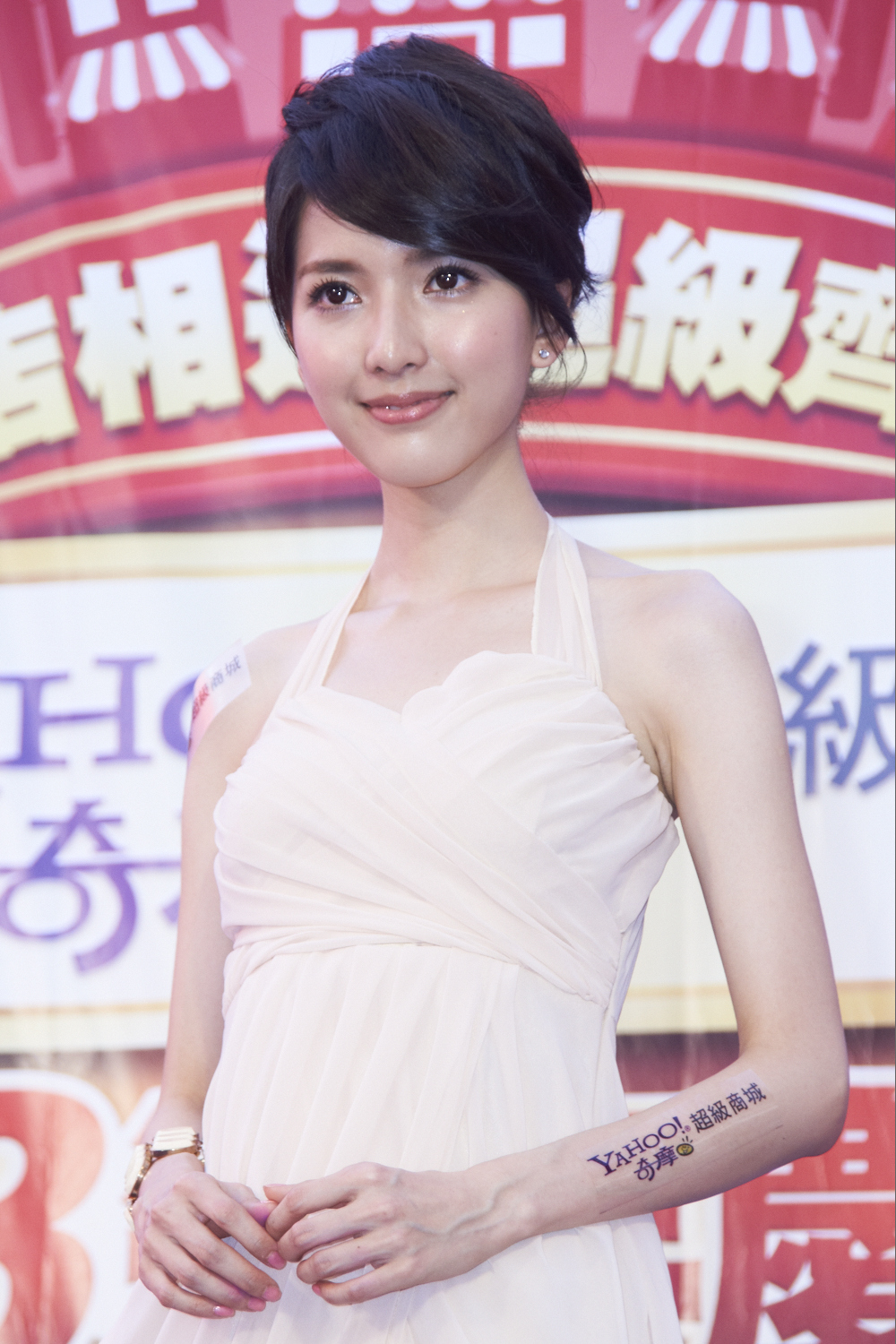
- Born: 20 November 1987 (age 37); Taipei, Taiwan
- Education: National Taiwan University (BA)
- Occupation(s): Actress, model
- Years active: 2008-present
- Musical career
- Also known as: Chen Kuang-yi; Jessie Chen
- Labels: HIM International Music (2011-2016)

Chinese name
- Traditional Chinese: 陳匡怡
- Simplified Chinese: 陈匡怡
Transcriptions
Standard Mandarin
- Hanyu Pinyin: Chén Kuāngyí

Andrea Chen (Chinese: 陳匡怡; pinyin: Chén Kuāngyí; born 20 November 1987) is a Taiwanese actress and model. She graduated from National Taiwan University.

Chen has been dubbed "Little Vivian Chow" by the Taiwanese media due to her resemblance to the Hong Kong actress and singer.

She started her career as a commercial model and appeared in music videos before embarking on an acting career. She made her acting debut in 2011 starring as the second lead actress in the popular television series In Time with You, playing the role of Maggie.

== Filmography ==
=== Television series ===
Year	Network	English title	Original title	Role	Notes
2011	FTV/GTV	In Time with You	我可能不會愛你	Maggie Lin	
2014	TTV/GTV	Prince William	威廉王子	Yi Xin	
2014	Youku/Tudou	Tiny Times	小時代之摺紙時代	Nan Xiang	
2015	CTV/CTI	Heart Of Steel	鋼鐵之心	Chen Yijun	
2015	Tudou	My Ghost Friend	我的鬼基友	Han Siyi	
2016	CTV	Your Majesty	皇恩浩蕩	Gu Yourong	

=== Film ===
Year	English title	Mandarin title	Role	Notes
2012	To My Dear Granny	親愛的奶奶	Princess	Cameo
2012	Westgate Tango	西門町	Jingjing	Cameo
2013	Sunshine Showcase	陽光櫥窗		Short film

=== Music video appearances ===
Year	Song title	Details
2008	"Promised Happiness" (說好的幸福呢)	Singer(s): Jay Chou; Album: Capricorn
2008	"Mystery" (神秘嘉賓)	Singer(s): Yoga Lin; Album: Mystery Guest
2009	"Weightless" (無重力)	Singer(s): Will Pan; Album: 007
2010	"Aishiteru" (愛伊攜帶汝)	Singer(s): Chase Chang; Album: The Next Chapter (下一個章節)
2010	"Firefly" (螢火蟲)	Singer(s): Chase Chang; Album: The Next Chapter (下一個章節)
2010	"Bo Ya Cuts The Strings" (伯牙絕弦)	Singer(s): Wang Leehom; Album: The 18 Martial Arts
2011	"Departed Heaven" (無間天堂)	Singer(s): Anthony Neely; Album: Single
2011	"Love Do Not Disturb" (別再驚動愛情)	Singer(s): Nicholas Teo; Album: Let's Not Fall in Love Again (别再惊动爱情)
2012	"A Failed Attempt" (失敗的分手)	Singer(s): Anthony Neely; Album: Wake Up
2013	"Thousandth" (千分之一)	Singer(s): Alien Huang; Album: Make Sense (超有感)
