= Play It Cool (Will Pan album) =

- Play It Cool cover

Studio album 玩酷 by Will Pan
- Released: 14 September 2007
- Genre: Mandopop
- Language: Mandarin
- Label: Universal Music Taiwan

Will Pan chronology
Around the World (2006)	Play It Cool (2007)	Will's Future (2008)

Alternative cover

Play It Cool (Chinese: 玩酷; pinyin: Wan Ku) is Taiwanese Mandopop artist Will Pan's (Chinese: 潘瑋柏) sixth Mandarin studio album. It was released by Universal Music Taiwan on 14 September 2007.

A second edition Play It Cool ("Unable To Resist" Perfect Collectible Edition) (CD+DVD) (Chinese: 玩酷 [無法抗拒 完美珍藏版 CD+DVD]) was released on 9 November 2007 with a bonus DVD containing five music videos, (Note: as listed in the Music Video section) including one with highlights of Will Pan's world tour live in-concert and a 24-page Will Pan photobok.

== Songs ==
The album features 11 new studio tracks with track "Shut Up" being a collaboration with Mandopop artist Shin, former lead singer of Taiwanese rock band SHIN, which was also included in his first studio album I'm Just Me. The title track "玩酷" (Play It Cool) is a mid-tempo dance track, composed by Will and Jeremy Ji and the lyrics co-written by Will. The other lead track "路太彎" (Road Too Windy) is a mellow ballad with the music video featuring Tarcy Su.

== Reception ==
The album debuted at number one on Taiwan's G-Music Weekly Top 20 Mandarin and Combo Charts; and Five Music Chart at week 37 with a percentage sales of 28.02%, 14.74%, and 6.5% respectively. It peaked at number one for one week and charted continuously in the Mandarin Chart for 6 weeks, the Combo Chart for 5 weeks and the 5 Music Chart for 4 weeks.

The track "玩酷" (Play It Cool) won Top 10 Gold Songs and Top 10 Gold Songs Gold Award at the Hong Kong TVB8 Awards, presented by television station TVB8, in 2007.

== Track listing ==
1. "玩酷" Wán Kù (Play It Cool) - 3'38"
2. "光榮" Guāng Róng (Glory) - 3'27"
3. "完美故事" Wán Měi Gù Shì (Perfect Story) - 3'26"
4. "路太彎" Lù Tài Wān (Road Too Windy) - 3'40"
5. "白日夢" Bái Rì Mèng (Daydream) - 4'00"
6. "說你愛我" Shuō Nǐ Ài Wǒ (Say You Love Me) - 3'58"
7. "愛不離" Ài Bù Lí (Love Doesn't Leave) - 4'11"
8. "無法抗拒" Wú Fǎ Kàng Jù (Unable To Resist) - 3'21"
9. "客串情人" Kè Chuàn Qĺng Rén (Acting Lover) - 3'37"
10. "左右" Zuǒ Yòu (Left Right) - 5'31"
11. "Shut Up" (feat Shin) - 3'31"

== Music video ==
1. "玩酷" (Play It Cool) MV
2. "路太彎" (The Road Is Too Winding) MV - feat Tarcy Su
3. "說你愛我" (Say You Love Me) MV
4. "無法抗拒" (Unable To Resist) MV
5. "站在你這邊" (Standing By Yourside) - Will Pan's world tour live in-concert highlights MV

== Chart ==
Chart Name	Debut Position	Week# / Week Dates of Peak Position	Peak Position	Percentage of Album Sales at Peak	Chart Run
Five Music Taiwan; 5大金榜	#1	#37 / 14–20 September 2007	#1	6.5%	4 weeks
G-Music Mandarin Chart, Taiwan 風雲榜 (華語榜)	#1	#37 / 14–20 September 2007	#1	28.02%	6 Weeks
G-Music Combo Chart, Taiwan 風雲榜 (綜合榜)	#1	#37 / 14–20 September 2007	#1	14.74%	5 weeks
