= Zhang Xianzi =

Chinese singer

Zhang Xianzi 张弦子
- Birth name: Zhang Xianzi
- Also known as: Xianzi
- Born: 22 April 1986 (age 39); Debao County, Baise, Guangxi, China
- Origin: Baise, Guangxi, China
- Genres: Mandopop
- Years active: 2005-present
- Labels: Enjoy Music/Universal Music
- Website: Personal Blog

Zhang Xianzi (simplified Chinese: 张弦子; Traditional Chinese: 張弦子; pinyin: Zhāng Xiánzǐ; born April 22, 1986) is a Chinese singer of Zhuang ethnicity. She is professionally known by her given name 弦子 (Xianzi) which translates to "harp" in English.

== Biography ==
Zhang's father is a train conductor. She studied in No.12 High School in Maoming, Guangdong province. While Zhang was in high school, she composed several songs with her classmates and posted them on the internet. She became famous among internet composers in Guangdong province. After Zhang graduated from high school, she went back to Guangxi. In Guangxi, she went to Guangxi Art College in Nanning where she majored in dance.

In 2005, she was discovered by Taiwanese producer Zihong Chen and became a singer. In 2006, she collaborated with Will Pan on the song “I Have to Love (不得不愛; Bu De Bu Ai)” from his fourth studio album The Expert, a Chinese-language remake of the 2004 Korean song, "Y (Please Tell Me Why)" by Freestyle. This song made her popular in both Mainland China and Taiwan. In 2007, she was nominated for the Best Rookie singer in Golden Melody Awards, which is the biggest music award in Taiwan.

== Discography ==
- 2006: The First Album (弦子首張專輯)
- 2007: Wrong Direction (EP)
- 2008: The Queen of Love (不愛最大)
- 2010: Innocent (天真)
- 2011: Roses In The Wind (逆風的薔薇)
- 2013: What's What (看走眼)
- 2019: Big till the End (大条到底)
