= Will Pan's Freestyle Remix 2005 =

- Will Pan's Freestyle Remix 2005 cover

Remix album 潘瑋柏混音 by Will Pan
- Released: 16 December 2005
- Genre: Mandopop
- Language: Mandarin
- Label: Universal Music Taiwan

Will Pan chronology
The Expert 高手 (2005)	Will Pan's Freestyle Remix 2005 (2005)	Around the World 反轉地球 (2006)

Will Pan's Freestyle Remix 2005 (Chinese: 潘瑋柏混音2005) is Taiwanese Mandopop artist Will Pan's (Chinese: 潘瑋柏) first Mandarin remix album. It was released by Universal Music Taiwan on 16 December 2005.

== Track listing ==
1. "決戰鬥室" [Battle Room]
2. "誰是MVP" [Who's MVP]
3. "高手" [The Expert]
4. "一指神功" [Android]
5. "背水一戰"
6. "快樂崇拜" (Adoration to Happiness) - duet with Angela Chang
7. "壁虎漫步" [Gecko Stroll]
8. "Wu Ha"
9. "Tell Me"
10. "我的麥克風" (Pass Me The Mic)

Bonus VCD

1. "決戰鬥室" [Battle Room] special version (MV)
2. "一指神功" [Android] (MV)
