= Will Pan =

American-Taiwanese rapper (born 1980)

- 潘瑋柏
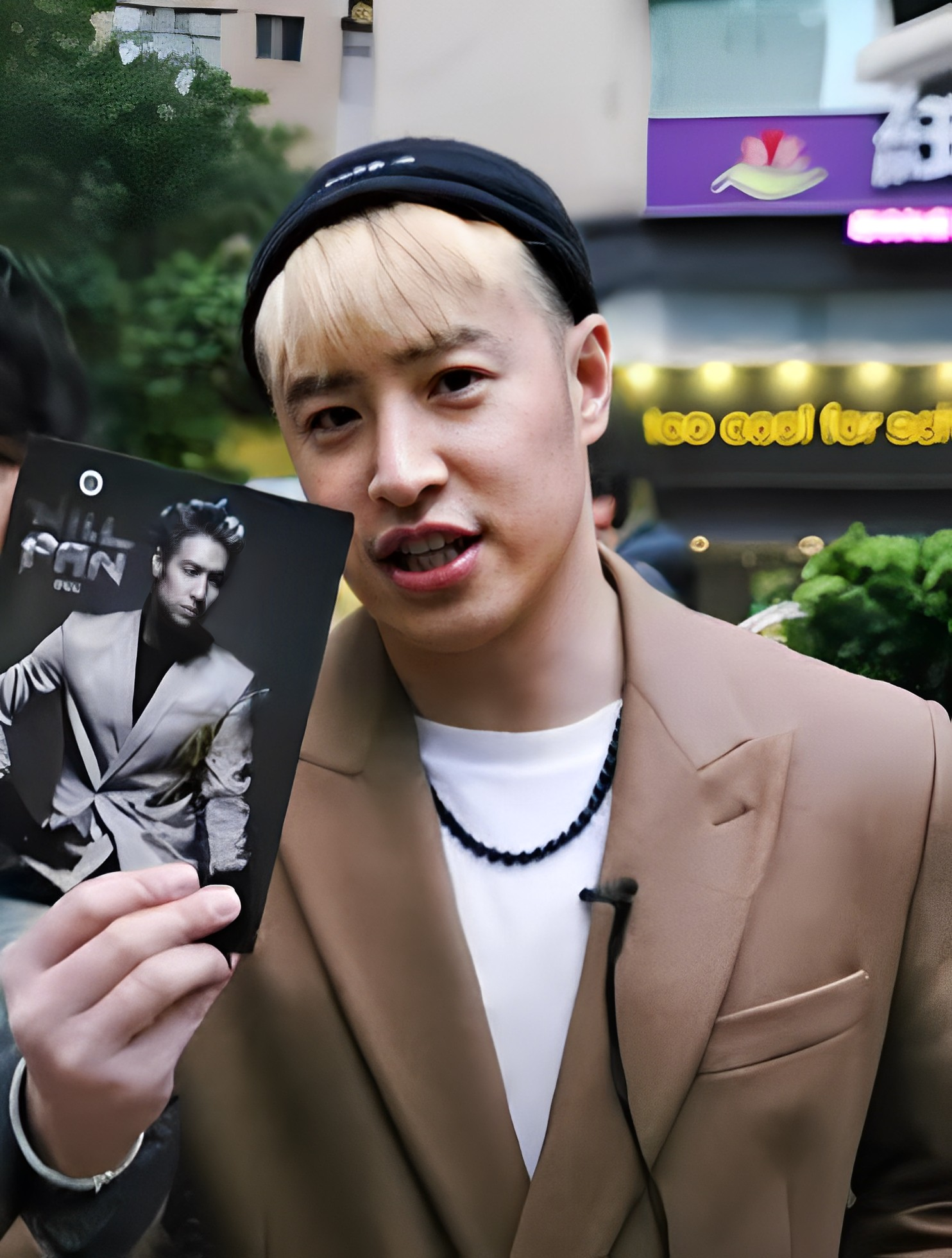
- Pan on a WebTVAsia show in February 2017
- Born: 6 August 1980 (age 46); West Virginia, U.S.
- Occupations: Singer; songwriter; actor; host; music producer; entrepreneur; rapper
- Years active: 2001–present
- Agents: Alpha Sonic (2012–present) Juicy Music (2005–2011); Carrier Creative Mate (2001–2005)
- Spouse: Luna Xuan Yun (宣云) (m. 2019)
- Children: 1
- Awards: 46th Golden Bell Awards – Best Actor; 2011 Endless Love
- Musical career
- Also known as: Pan Weibo; Pan Wei-bo; Pan Shuai (潘帥)
- Origin: Taiwan
- Genres: Mandopop; hip-hop; electronic; R&B
- Labels: Shanghai Bo Le Sheng Jing Music (上海柏樂盛景音樂有限公司; 2023–present); Warner Music Taiwan (2017–2021); Universal Music Taiwan (2002–2015); BMG (2001–2002)

Chinese name
- Traditional Chinese: 潘瑋柏
- Simplified Chinese: 潘玮柏
- Hanyu Pinyin: Pān Wěibó
- Hokkien POJ: Phoaⁿ Úi-pek
- Website: willpan.com.tw

Wilber Pan (born 6 August 1980), also known as Will Pan, is a Taiwanese-American singer, songwriter, rapper, actor, and entrepreneur. He started his career as a host of Channel V programs. In 2011, Pan was awarded Best Actor for Endless Love (愛∞無限) at the 46th Golden Bell Awards, Taiwan's equivalent to the Emmy Awards.

In recent years, Pan ventured into the business world. Pan's business interests extends into streetwear fashion and developing of mobile games. In 2009, he launched the streetwear boutique N.P.C (New Project Center) which he collaborated with Chinese host Nic Li, in Shanghai. N.P.C also has its stores in Beijing, Hangzhou, Chengdu, and at online shopping website Taobao. In 2010, Pan established his streetwear brand "Undisputed" and modelled for the brand's promotional ads. He is also the cofounder and chief creative officer of software company Camigo Media, which develops popular mobile games such as "Fish Off", "Pig Rockets" and "MeWantBamboo 2", that has achieved over 20 million downloads to date.

In April 2013, Pan was ranked 76th on 2013 Forbes China Celebrity 100 list, and 44th on the income list which was based on his estimated earnings of $31.9 million yuan in 2012.

== Early life ==
Pan was born in West Virginia, United States but moved to Taiwan at the age of seven. He attended Dominican International School and Taipei American School and graduated in 1999. He was offered an athletic scholarship in basketball by an NCAA college, but chose to continue his education at California State Polytechnic University, Pomona in the United States. However, he left before graduating to pursue a showbiz career.

In 1999, Pan took part in singing contest "BCC Star" while interning at the Broadcasting Corporation of China. He performed the song "Can't Wait" by Steve Seungjun Yoo and Yuki Hsu in the finals and later went on to participate in NMG/BMG Los Angeles Singing Competition. The song which he performed, Alex To's "You Are Spoiled" (把你寵壞) won him the "Best Image Award". His performance at the singing competition caught the attention of Andy Lau's manager and he was invited to audition for Channel V's program host in Hong Kong.

== Career ==
=== 2001–2002 ===
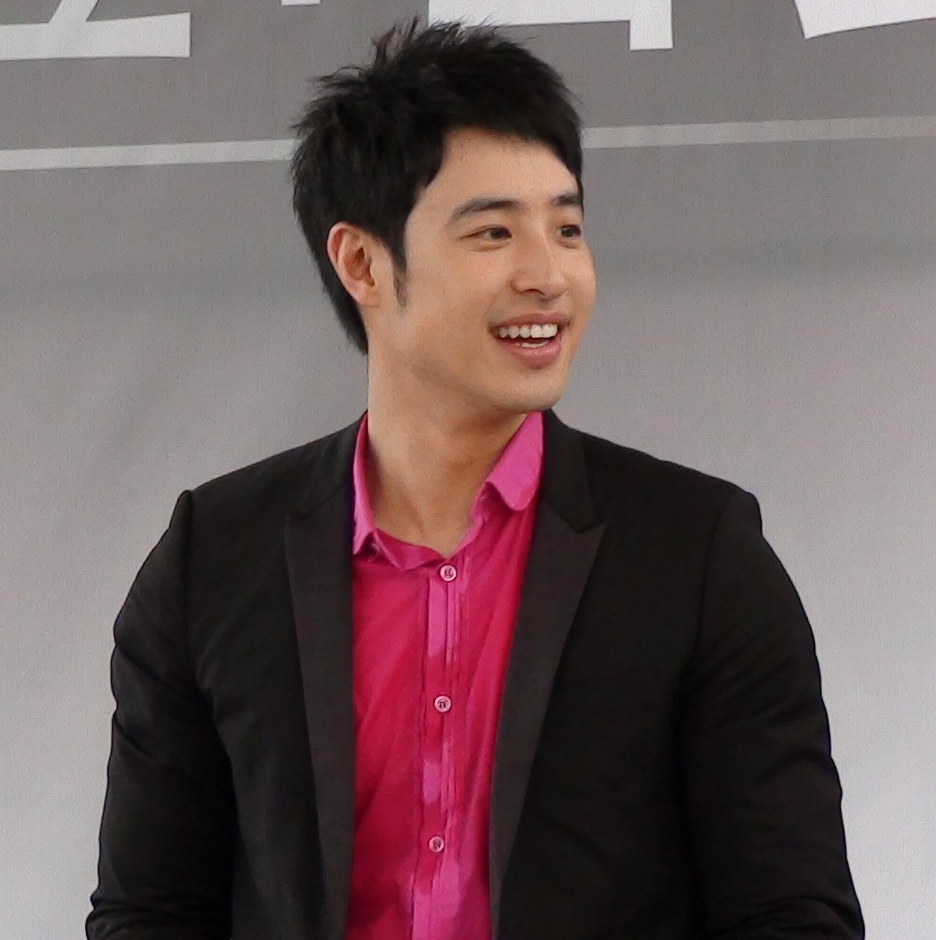
Pan in Singapore in August 2009

In 2001, Pan signed to BMG and made his debut hosting V Style Society alongside Jason Tang. In the same year, he acted in Taiwanese drama Great Teacher (麻辣鮮師) and contributed four songs in the original soundtrack.

In 2002, Will released his debut Mandarin solo album, Gecko Stroll, which sold over 130,000 copies in Taiwan. The album contains the track "By My Side" (站在你這邊) composed by Jay Chou and "I'm Not Afraid" (我不怕) composed by Chinese singer Anson Hu. He collaborated with Evonne Hsu on the track "Special Guest" (特別來賓).

He was featured in Alec Su's 2002 song "Playing for Real" (玩真的).

=== 2003–2004 ===
His second album Pass Me The Mic was released in the following year on 19 September. The album includes his collaboration with Jason Tang on the track "Curry Chili" (咖哩辣椒). To promote his album, Pan starred in a five-part "music love story" (音樂愛情故事) which aired on SETTV variety show "Showbiz" (完全娛樂).

In October 2003, he held his first mini concert "Will's Show" at Nangang 101. A VCD, "Will Show Music Video Karaoke" which contains the concert highlights, was released in Jan 2004. In the compilation album "U Love" released by Universal Music Taiwan, he worked with Universal Music artists Energy and Evonne Hsu on the single "Universal Love".

He was awarded "Best Male Artist in sales records" at 2003 "G-Music Chart Awards" for Gecko Stroll.

He appeared as guest star in 2003 dramas Love Train (心動列車) and "Wu He Tian" (無河天).

In June 2004, he released a pictorial and conversational English book "Never Teach Me Grammar" (就是不想學文法). He cowrote the contents when he was hospitalized for knee injuries.

He was featured in American singer-songwriter Christina Milian's song Dip It Low (Asian Mix), which is recorded in It's About Time (Asian Special Edition).

On 7 August 2004, Will staged his first overseas ticketed concert "Cool Play Concert" at Singapore Indoor Stadium with Taiwanese artist Chang Shan-wei.

On 3 September 2004, he released his third album Wu Ha which features a duet, "Adoration to Happiness" (快樂崇拜), with Angela Zhang. The album contains the track 「我讓你走了」 (Letting You Go) composed by Taiwanese singer Tank.

=== 2005–2006 ===
In July 2005, Pan released his fourth studio album The Expert, featuring Chinese singer Zhang Xianzi in the hit song 「不得不愛」 (Cannot Not Love). He convened a team,"Pan@sonic," to assist him in album productions. The self-penned lead single 「誰是 MVP」 (Who's MVP) is mainly about an ambition to be the MVP in career and areas of interest. It also talks about Pan's emotional setbacks when he sustained serious ligament injury. The album also contains the song 「跟我走吧」 (Leave With Me) composed by singer-songwriter JJ Lin.

On 13 August 2005, Pan held a celebration show in Taipei, performing tracks mainly from The Expert.

In December 2005, he released a remix album Will Pan's Freestyle Remix 2005 which contains the remix versions of his previously released hits and a bonus VCD of 「決戰鬥室」 (Battle Room) special version MV and 「一指神功」 (Android) MV.

On 23 June 2006, Pan released his fifth studio album Around the World which includes 2 duets. He collaborated with Taiwanese seasoned singer Su Rui on the track 「我想更慬你」 (I Wanna Understand You More) which is about contradictions between a mother and son. The other duet, 「戴上我的愛」 (Wear My Love), features Chinese singer May Wang. The MV of the title track 「反轉地球」 (Around The World) featured his "Pan@sonic" team members, Taiwanese well-known choreographer Rambo (藍波) and songwriter Jeremy Ji. The album also contains the track "Pan@sonic", composed by the team. "Pan@sonic" subsequently dissolved shortly after Jeremy Ji left to pursue a singing career.

Shortly after the release of Around the World, one of the tracks 「著迷」 (Mesmerized) was accused of plagiarism by netizens. The MV concept of the song was also accused of being highly similar to South Korean singer Rain's song I Do. The credited composer Kuan Weitang (官煒棠) later admitted to plagiarizing the 1998 song "Each Time" by East 17. He eventually made an apology, agreeing to drop his name from the credits and bear all legal consequences. It was reported that Pan expressed shock and disappointment over the plagiarism incident.

On 30 September 2006, Pan embarked on his first official headlining tour "Will Pan Around The World Concert Tour" which kicked off in Shanghai, China. Faye from Taiwanese band F.I.R. and singer Shin were special guests for the first stop. The concert tour went on for 16 months, from Sept 2006 to January 2008.

=== 2007–2008 ===
In September 2007, Pan released his sixth studio album Play It Cool. The album includes a collaboration with Mandopop singer and SHIN band former vocalist, Shin on the rock song "Shut Up". He worked with singer Tarcy Su, Taiwanese actress Angus Chang and Chinese actress Betty Sun in the MVs of 「路太彎」 (Road Too Windy), 「說你愛我」 (Say You Love Me) and 「愛不離」 (Love Doesn't Leave) respectively.

On 20 October 2007, he resumed his "Around The World Concert Tour" at Hefei in China, in line with the release of Play It Cool. Jay Chou was the special guest and they performed 「聽媽媽的話」 (Listen to Mother's Words) from Jay's album Still Fantasy. The concert tour was later held in other cities of China, before ending on 1 January 2008 in Guangzhou. He released a concert DVD "Will Pan 2006–2007 Around The World Concert Tour" on 20 July 2007 which contains live and behind-the scenes footages of the tour.

In March 2008, Will collaborated with Jacky Cheung and S.H.E on the track 「紅遍全球」 (Red Around The World) (Third Edition). The song is recorded by brand ambassadors of Coca-Cola, as one of the torch relay songs at the 2008 Summer Olympics.

On 18 July 2008, Pan released his first compilation album, Will's Future. It contains three new tracks, two medley remixes and 29 previously released songs. One of the new tracks, 「夏日瘋」 (Summer Craze), is the opening theme song of Taiwanese drama Miss No Good, which starred Will and Rainie Yang. The album also includes Will's first attempt in a Cantonese song which is the other version of ballad track 「轉機」(Transfer). A second edition of Will's Future, released three months later, contains four instrumental tracks of Miss No Good and its insert song 「同一個遺憾」 (Same Regret) which Pan collaborated with Jeremy Ji.

=== 2009–2011 ===
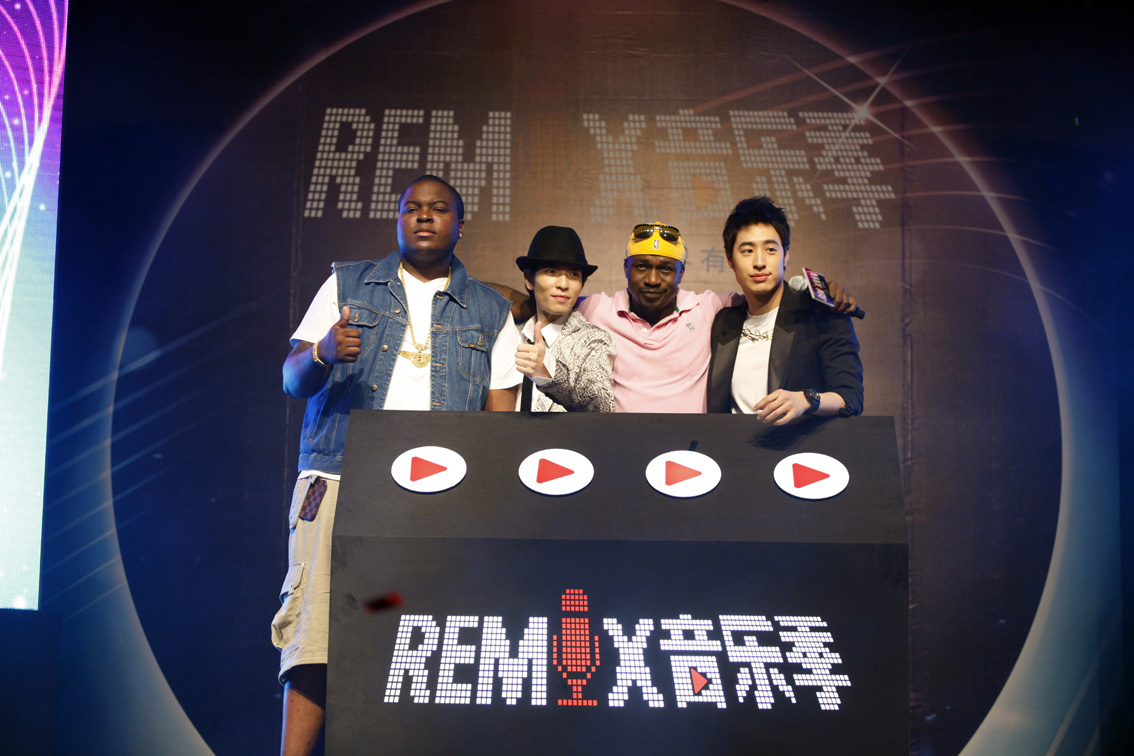
Pan, Sean Kingston, Jam Hsiao and Andrew Ballen at a press conference in 2011

On 22 May 2009, Pan released his seventh studio album, 007. It features a duet, "Be with You" with American R&B singer Akon. The MV of the track 「雙人舞」 (Pas de Deux), with production costs of NT$7 million, features South Korean actress Lee Da-hae. Pan also worked with Taiwanese actress Chen Kuangyi and Annie Chen in the music videos of 「無重力」 (Weightless) and 「寂屋出租」 (Silence Room for Rent).

Pan held his second headlining tour, I'm Will Concert Tour, between September and December 2009. The futuristic-themed tour began in Shanghai, China and final stop held in Taipei, Taiwan.

In 2010, Pan guest starred in Pandamen directed by Jay Chou, and acted in Endless Love with Sandrine Pinna.

In January 2011, Pan released his eighth studio album, 808, which features the opening theme song 「我們都怕痛」 (We Are All Afraid of Pain) of Endless Love. He composed five tracks on the album including 「觸動」 (Touch) which he collaborated with Nichkhun of Korean boy band 2PM on the music video.

On 18 June 2011, Pan was the opening act of the 22nd Golden Melody Awards (the Chinese equivalent to the Grammy Awards), held at Taipei Arena.

After starring in Endless Love, Pan was offered a number of acting opportunities, including the leading actor role of popular Taiwanese drama Love You. However, he declined the offers and cited that he will only consider roles which he is confident of performing up to his expectations. The role of Love You later went to actor Joseph Chang, who was also nominated in the same category as Pan in the 46th Golden Bell Awards.

On 21 October 2011, Pan was awarded Best Actor at the 46th Golden Bell Awards, Taiwan for Endless Love.

=== 2012 ===
In May, Pan was awarded three awards including "HITO Top 10 Songs" for the song "U U U" at Taiwan HITO Radio Music Awards. In the same month, he was named the ambassador of 2012 Asia Metro Street Dance Competition.

Between 28 and 29 August, Pan partnered with Google+ and YouTube, and held a 24-hour Google+ Hangouts On-Air, in line with the promotion of his new album. He is the first Taiwanese American celebrity to broadcast publicly snippets of his life on a livestream Google+ Hangouts On-Air within a 24-hour timespan.

On 31 August, he released his ninth studio album The Story of Billy. It features the opening theme song 「華麗進行曲」 (Extravagant March) and the insert songs 「忘記擁抱」 (Forgetting The Hug) and 「專屬於你」 (Absolutely Yours), of Taiwanese drama Dong Men Si Shao. The MV of the title track 「24個比利」 (The Story of Billy) was directed by Hong Wonki and shot entirely in Korea with an all-Korean cast. He collaborated with Jeremy Ji in the MV of 「華麗進行曲」 (Extravagant March), and with Ann Hsu in the MV of 「忘記擁抱」 (Forgetting The Hug). He also worked with model-singer Dou Hua Mei in the MV of 「專屬於你」 (Absolutely Yours). The Story of Billy was the number-one album for 2 weeks on Taiwan's G-Music Weekly Top 20 Mandarin and Combo Charts and number one for 1 week on Five Music Chart.

On 26 September, he was one of the performers for the opening ceremony of the 21st Golden Rooster Film Festival held in Shaoxing, China.

On 9 October, Pan released the second edition of The Story of Billy. It contains the remix version of 「The Story of Billy」(24個比利) and a bonus DVD with six music videos. On 13 October, he held a celebration concert at Neo19 in Taipei, which was broadcast simultaneously on his YouTube Channel. He performed all the songs from The Story of Billy, including a piano rendition of 「24個比利」 (The Story of Billy). Singer-actress Cyndi Wang made a guest appearance during the song 「華麗進行曲」 (Extravagant March).

At the 47th Golden Bell Awards held on 26 October, Pan and Taiwanese actress Tien Hsin (天心) presented the awards for the Best Actress and Best Director in a Television Series.

Pan's third concert tour, "Unleashed" Concert Tour, kicked off on 10 November 2012 at Shanghai Grand Stage (Shanghai Gymnasium) in China. For the first time ever, Pan took on the role of concert producer and is also involved in areas of stage, lighting and costume design, songs lineup and music arrangement.

The tour's first stop in Shanghai opened to a full house, and was attended by Pan's family members. He performed near to 30 songs of which more than two-thirds were his compositions. The concert was marked by 3D laser displays and an opening of Pan performing on a 3-story high ball-shaped time machine. His N.P.C copartner Nic Li was the concert guest and they sang a remix version of "Adoration to Happiness" (快樂崇拜), Party Rock Anthem and phenomenal song Gangnam Style. He ended the concert with an acoustic rendition of 「24個比利」 (The Story of Billy). The tour is slated to continue to various cities including Shenzhen and Taipei.

On 27 December, Pan and Nic Li officiated the opening of their third NPC store in Hangzhou. The event was graced by their celebrity friends including host Chen Chien-chou, Jason Tang and Hong Kong lyricist Wyman Wong.

At the 20th Chinese Music Chart Awards held at Taipei Arena on 29 December, Pan was awarded "All Round Artist of the Year" and "Most Popular Male Singer of the Year". He performed 「24個比利」 (The Story of Billy) that was awarded "Golden Melodies of the Year" .

=== 2013–present ===
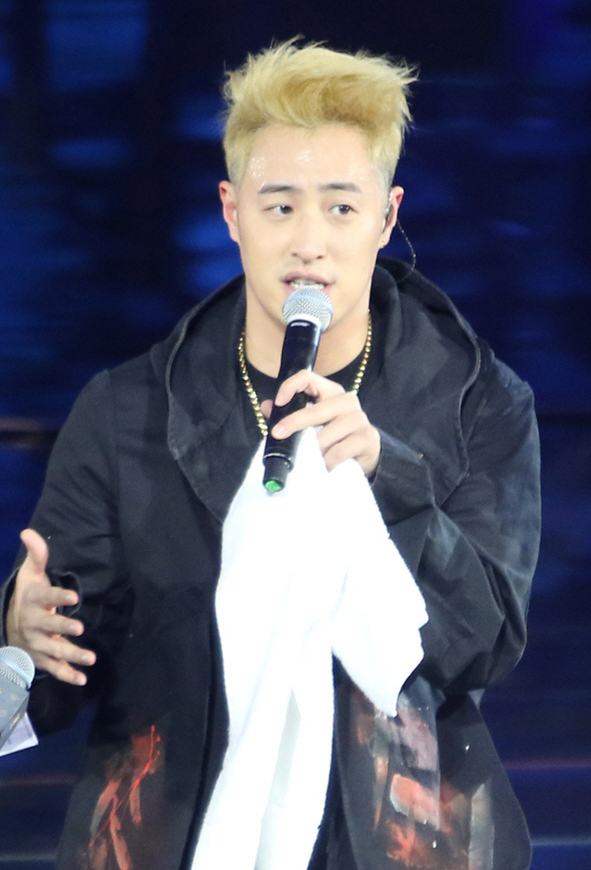
Pan at an event in Shanghai, January 2017

Pan was one of the big winners at the 3rd Global Chinese Golden Chart Awards. He was named "Most Popular Male Singer of the Year" and "Best Stage Performer of the Year". His song 「不想醒來」 (Don't Wanna Wake Up) from The Story of Billy was awarded the "Top 20 Golden Melodies of the Year". He attended the post-awards concert which took place at Vancouver, British Columbia, Canada on 17 May 2013.

On 14 April 2013, Pan took home the MY Astro choice for Best International Singer, Best Stage Performer and Top 25 Golden Melodies for the song 「不想醒來」 (Don't Wanna Wake Up) at MY Astro Music Awards, held at Putra Indoor Stadium, Malaysia. At the 17th Global Mandarin Chart Music Award (第17屆全球華語榜中榜), held on 18 April at CotaiArena, he was awarded "Best All Round Male Singer" and "Best Stage Performer".

On 21 April 2013, Pan was award presenter and guest performer at Singapore Star Awards 2013. He presented the "Best Theme Song" award and performed a string of his hit songs.

In May 2013, Pan was named the national anti-drugs ambassador of the year by the Ministry of Justice of Taiwan.

Pan's tenth studio album, Crown & Clown, was released on 13 June 2014. The album debuted at number one on the Taiwan Five Music Mandarin Chart, G-Music Weekly Top 20 Combo Chart and Chia Chia Record Mandarin Chart. The album's lead single, "小丑" (Clown), written and composed by Pan, premiered on Hit FM radio station on 12 May. The album features a duet, 「打呼」 (Snore), which Pan collaborated with Rainie Yang. 「打呼」 (Snore) is the opening theme song for the Taiwanese television series Tie The Knot (媽咪的男朋友).

Pan was scheduled to hold his Taipei concert on 25 October 2014, in support of his album Crown & Clown. The concert was, however, cancelled after Pan suffered severe head injuries while rehearsing for a mid-air stunt segment for the song "小丑" (Clown) at the Taipei Arena. He was reportedly rushed to the hospital where he received two stitching procedures and treatment for injuries that include a 17-centimetre cut on his scalp. He was also diagnosed to have suffered from a concussion. His management agency thereafter released a statement saying that the doctors have advised Pan to be kept under observation for at least five to seven days. On 14 December 2014, Pan announced via Facebook that the concert was rescheduled to 31 January 2015. The rescheduled show was recorded and released as a 2-disc DVD on 25 December 2015, and features guest performers Jolin Tsai, Rainie Yang and Show Lo.

In March 2017, Pan signed with record company Warner Music Taiwan and released the album illi in the same year. In 2020, he released his twelfth studio album Mr. R&Beats; his contract with Warner Music reportedly ended in 2021.

== Personal life ==
=== Family ===
Pan's father, of Shanghai descent, is a business management and psychology professor. His mother, an alumnus of the prestigious Taipei First Girls' High School, is of Fukienese descent. His parents were featured on the track "How" (Chinese: 怎麼著) from Pan's seventh album 007. He has a brother who is three years younger. During the early years of his career, Pan had helped to fund his brother's studies in the United States.

=== Relationships ===
Pan maintains a relatively low profile in his personal life. His first girlfriend was a mixed race Chinese-Dutch schoolmate whom he briefly dated for a month. During his high school days, he dated a Japanese senior schoolmate, who is of mixed heritage and a year older. The three-year long relationship ended when Pan started out as an actor and singer. In 2006, he composed the song "Thank You" ("謝謝") to commemorate this romance which he described as "the most unforgettable relationship I ever had". In the early days of his career, it was reported that he had a three-year long relationship with his Great Teacher costar Fan Hsiao-fun, and he had written the rap for her song "Restrained" ("束縛") in 2002. Pan is also romantically linked to his former label-mate Chu An-yu and singer Angela Chang whom he had collaborated on the song "Adoration to Happiness" ("快樂崇拜" ). In 2010, Taiwanese tabloids reported that Pan was dating his former schoolmate, Bebe Yang, the daughter of a real estate entrepreneur and in 2014, the rumored relationship resurfaced after further reports suggested that they have been living together for a period of time. However, the couple reportedly ended their relationship in 2016.

On 27 July 2020, Pan revealed in an instagram post that he is married. Appledaily reported that Pan's wife is a China Eastern Airlines air stewardess from Shanghai who is thirteen years younger than Pan. Two days after his marriage announcement, Pan posted a legal warning on his work studio's weibo demanding an apology from netizens who insinuated that his wife Luna has had illicit dealings with the privileged class in China and that she had lied about her age (online users claimed that she was born in 1989 or 1991 instead of 1994). It was noted that this is the first time Pan has ever released a lawyer's letter in his entire career.

In March 2021, it was reported that Pan and his wife have a daughter who was born in August 2020.

Pan and his wife had their wedding ceremony at Alila Villas Uluwatu in Bali, Indonesia on 29 November 2023. Celebrities who attended the wedding included Rainie Yang, Li Ronghao, Michelle Chen, Shin, Wang Leehom, and Laurinda Ho.

=== Basketball ===
Pan has been an avid basketball fan since his early youth. He was the captain of his high school's basketball team and a well-known figure in school for his outstanding performance in the sport. He was awarded MVP in high school and it won him an athletic scholarship to further his studies in the United States. Though he did not take up the offer, he continued playing basketball during his university days and till today. Some of his songs were inspired by his passion for basketball, notably 「誰是 MVP」 (Who's MVP), 「決戰鬥室」 (Battle Room), 「一指神功」 (Android), 「背水一戰」 (Never Lose) and 「光榮」 (Glory).

=== Philanthropy ===
In 2009, Pan composed the mid-tempo track, 「親愛的」 (My Dear), which is the theme song of 2009 World Vision Taiwan (WVT)'s "Be Friends with Children of the World" campaign. The music video features the footages of Pan's visit to Honduras for World Vision projects.

In August 2012, Pan visited Guiyang in China to interact with beneficiaries of Music Radio "I Want to Go to School" charity project. As ambassador of the project, he composed the theme song "Love X Love" (愛X愛) and roped in various artists of Universal Music, including Fish Leong and Da Mouth, to lend their voices in the single.

In October 2013, Pan and his Miss No Good costar Rainie Yang were appointed official coambassadors for the twenty-fifth edition of the "30 Hour Famine" event in Taiwan. Two months later, Pan and Yang went on a 6-day field visit to Niger to increase awareness on the plight of children whose survival is threatened daily.

== Discography ==
- Gecko Stroll (2002)
- Pass Me the Mic (2003)
- Wu Ha (2004)
- The Expert (2005)
- Around the World (2006)
- Play It Cool (2007)
- 007 (2009)
- 808 (2011)
- The Story of Billy (2012)
- Crown & Clown (2014)
- illi (2017)
- Mr. R&Beats (2020)

== Concert ==
=== Joint concert ===
Date	Location	Venue	Remarks
7 August 2004	Singapore	Singapore Indoor Stadium	Singapore Cool Play Concert with Chang Shan-wei

=== Solo concert ===
2006–2008 Will Pan Around The World Concert Tour
Date	Location	Venue	Special guest(s)
30 September 2006	Shanghai, China	Shanghai Stadium	Faye (Taiwanese), Shin
28 October 2006	Nanjing, China	Nanjing Olympic Sports Center Gymnasium	Jay Chou
24–26 November 2006	Beijing, China	Beijing Exhibition Theater	–
3 December 2006	Quanzhou, China	Jinjiang Stadium	Shin, S.H.E
20 October 2007	Hefei, China	Hefei Olympic Sports Center Stadium	Jay Chou
18 November 2007	Chengdu, China	Chengdu Sports Center	Shin
8 December 2007	Guiyang, China	Guiyang New Stadium	–
1 January 2008	Guangzhou, China	Century Lotus Stadium	–

2009 I'm Will Concert Tour
Date	Location	Venue	Special guest(s)
18 September 2009	Shanghai, China	Hongkou Football Stadium	Jeremy Ji
17 October 2009	Wuhan, China	Xinhua Road Sports Center	Jeremy Ji
24 October 2009	Beijing, China	Workers Stadium	Jeremy Ji
6 December 2009	Taipei, Taiwan	Taipei Arena	MC HotDog, Evonne Hsu, Jessie Chiang, Jeremy Ji, Jason Tang

2012–2014 Will Pan Unleashed Concert Tour
Date	Location	Venue	Special guest(s)
10 November 2012	Shanghai, China	Shanghai Grand Stage (Shanghai Gymnasium)	Nic Li
17 November 2012	Beijing, China	MasterCard Center	Kenji Wu
19 January 2013	Macau, China	CotaiArena	–
24 March 2013	Guangzhou, China	Guangzhou Gymnasium	–
29 June 2013	Shenzhen, China	Shenzhen Bay Sports Center	–
20 July 2013	Singapore	The MAX Pavilion	–
9 February 2014	Connecticut, United States	Mohegan Sun Arena	Ocean Ou

Kingdom of Eve 伊殿園 Concert
Date	Location	Venue	Special guest(s)
25 October 2014 (Rescheduled to 31 January 2015)	Taipei, Taiwan	Taipei Arena	Jolin Tsai, Rainie Yang, Show Lo

Alpha 創使者世界巡迴演唱會 Concert
Date	Location	Venue	Special guest(s)
21 April 2018	Beijing, China	Cadillac Arena	
23 June 2018	Chengdu, China	Chengdu Performing Arts Center	
29 June 2018	Shenzhen, China	Shenzhen Bay Sports Center	
28 July 2018	Nanning, China	Guangxi Sports Center	
8 August 2018	Shanghai, China	Mercedes-Benz Arena	
18 August 2018	Fuzhou, China	Haixia Olympic Center Stadium	
15 September 2018	Nanjing, China	Nanjing Olympic Sports Center	
13 October 2018	Zhangjiagang, China	Zhangjiagang Stadium	
17 November 2018	Wuhan, China	Optical Valley International Tennis Center	
1 December 2018	Guangzhou, China	Guangzhou International Sports Arena	
9 March 2019	Taipei, Taiwan	Taipei Arena	Jeannie Hsieh

創使者Coming Home Concert Tour
Date	Location	Venue	Special guest(s)
29 June 2019	Chongqing, China	Bloomage Live International Sports and Culture Center	
10 August 2019	Shanghai, China	Mercedes-Benz Arena	
24 August 2019	Kunming, China	Kunming Dianchi International Convention and Exhibition Center	
5 October 2019	Macau, China	CotaiArena	
13 October 2019	Beijing, China	Cadillac Arena	

2023 Coming Home Concert Tour
Date	Location	Venue	Special guest(s)
19 October 2023	Sydney, Australia	The Star Event Centre	
21 August 2023	Melbourne, Australia	Margaret Court Arena	

Mad Love Concert Tour
Date	Location	Venue	Special guest(s)
25 November 2023	Nanjing, China	Nanjing Olympic Sports Centre	
9 December 2023	Shenzhen, China	Shenzhen Universiade Sports Centre	
16 December 2023	Changsha, China	Hunan International Conference & Exhibition Center	
20 January 2024	Hangzhou, China	Olympic Sports Exposition & Exhibition Center Main Stadium	
9 March 2024	Suzhou, China	Suzhou Olympic Sports Centre	
30 March 2024	Qingdao, China	Qingdao Citizen Fitness Center	
13 April 2024	Guangzhou, China	Baoneng International Sports Arena	
26−27 April 2024	Shanghai, China	Mercedes-Benz Arena	
4 May 2024	Beijing, China	Wukesong Arena	BooM, SeanT
18 May 2024	Nanchang, China	Nanchang International Sports Center Stadium	
25 May 2024	Hefei, China	Shaoquan Sports Center	
1 June 2024	Xi'an, China	Xi'an Olympic Sports Center	
8 June 2024	Chengdu, China	Phoenix Hill Sports Park	
28−29 June 2024	Ningbo, China	Ningbo Olympic Sports Center	
13 July 2024	Wuhan, China	Optics Valley International Tennis Center	
20 July 2024 (Rescheduled to another date)	Genting Highlands, Malaysia	Arena of Stars	
27 July 2024	Singapore	Singapore Expo Hall 7	
3 August 2024	Chongqing, China	Huaxi Live Yudong	
24 August 2024	Tianjin, China	Tianjin Olympic Centre	

== Filmography ==
=== Television series ===
Year	English title	Original title	Role	Notes
2001	Great Teacher	麻辣鮮師	Money	Alternative title: Ma La Xian Shi
2002	Happy Campus	麻辣高校生	Money	Alternative title: Ma La Gao Xiao Sheng
2003	Love Train	心動列車	Jack	Cameo
2003	Wu He Tian	無河天	Himself	Cameo
2008	Miss No Good	不良笑花	Tang Men	
2010	Pandamen	熊貓人	Jason	Cameo
2010	Endless Love	愛∞無限	Liang Jing-hao	
2017	Be With You	不得不愛	Hu Qianyu	

=== Film ===
Year	English title	Original title	Role	Notes
2008	Kung Fu Panda	—N/a	Po	Voice (Mandarin)
2011	Kung Fu Panda 2	—N/a	Po	Voice (Mandarin)
2015	Bull Brothers	牛兄牛弟	Luo Ha	Voice

=== Variety and reality show ===
Year	Network	English title	Original title	Notes
2001	Channel V Taiwan	V Style Society	[V]式會社	Host
2001	Channel V Taiwan	Nan Fang Wa Kao Yao	南方哇靠妖	Host
2001	Channel V Taiwan	Da Han Liu	大韓流	Host
2002	Channel V Taiwan	On The Go	拍拍走	Host
2002	TVBS-G	La Mode News	—N/a	Host
2003	Channel V Taiwan	PK Hip Hop	嗆嘻哈	Host
2003	Channel V Taiwan	Jing Wu Men	精舞門	Host
2004	Channel V Taiwan	Will Show	Will秀	Host
2004	Channel V Taiwan	Top Dog	誰來挑戰	Host
2004	Channel V Taiwan	Hit On	勁爆點	Host
2015	Shenzhen TV	Charming Daddy	閃亮的爸爸	Appearance
2016	Zhejiang TV	Go to School China	我去上學啦	Season 2, appearance
2017	iQIYI	The Rap of China	中国有嘻哈	Season 1; judge and celebrity producer
2017	Jiangsu TV	We Are in Love	我們相愛吧 第三季	Season 3, appearance
2017	Jiangsu TV	Come On Brothers	來吧，兄弟	Appearance
2018	iQIYI	The Rap of China	中國新說唱	Season 2; judge and celebrity producer
2018	Zhejiang Television	Best of Us	最優的我們	
2018	ETtoday, TTV, CTi Variety	Jungle Voice	聲林之王	Episode 4 & 5
2019	Jiangsu TV	Beyond Show	百變達人	Appearance
2019	Tencent Sports	Slam Feat	籃球大唱片	Appearance
2019	iQIYI	The Rap of China	中國新說唱	Season 3; judge and celebrity producer
2019	iQIYI	Fourtry	潮流合夥人	
2020	YouTube, iQIYI, TTV, CTi TV	Dancing Diamond 52	菱格世代DD52	Leading coach
2020	iQIYI	The Rap of China	中國新說唱	Season 4; judge and celebrity producer
2020	Hunan TV	Sing or Spin	嗨唱轉起來	Season 2
2021	iQIYI	Youth With You 3	青春有你 3	Rap mentor
2021	iQIYI	The Generation Hip-hop Project	少年說唱企劃	Mentor
2022	Mango TV	Call Me by Fire	披荊斬棘	Season 2
2023	Zhejiang Television	Sing! China	中國好聲音	Season 8; mentor
2024	Jiangsu TV	Yin Ni Er Lai	音你而來	Cast member

== Published works ==
English title	Original title	Author	Date Published	Publisher
Wilber – Idol Loving Book	潘瑋柏寫真應援書	Will Pan	2 October 2003	Sharp Point Publishing Group
Never Teach Me Grammar	就是不想學文法－潘帥情境式英文不囉嗦	Will Pan	18 June 2004	SBooker Publications
Will& Jason's HIP HOP	潘瑋柏& Jason's HIP HOP	Will Pan, Jason Tang	5 October 2004	Bo Shi Ke Yi (柏室科藝)
2005 Cool Play Concert Pictorial Book	2005 Cool Play雙帥最激演唱寫真筆記書	Will Pan	3 February 2005	SBooker Publications
Miss No Good Documentary Book	不良笑花求愛全紀錄	Comic Field Productions	17 September 2008	Kadokawa Media (Taiwan)
Endless Love Photo Book	愛∞無限 美麗映象	SBooker Editorial	26 November 2010	SBooker Publications

== Awards and nominations ==
Year	Award	Category	Nominated work	Result	Ref.
2000	NMG/BMG Los Angeles Singing Competition	Best Image Award	—N/a	Won	
2003	Golden Melody Awards, Malaysia	Most Popular New Artist (Silver)	—N/a	Won	
2003	Golden Melody Awards, Malaysia	Most Potential Newcomer (Silver)	—N/a	Won	
2003	Phoenix TV Awards	Top 10 Albums of the Year	—N/a	Won	
2004	Hito Music Awards	Most Popular New Male Artist (popular vote)	—N/a	Won	
2005	Hong Kong TVB8 Awards	Top 10 Gold Songs	"誰是 MVP" (Who's MVP) from The Expert	Nominated	
2005	Hong Kong TVB8 Awards	Top 10 Gold Songs	"不得不愛" (Cannot Not Love) with Zhang Xianzi from The Expert	Nominated	
2007	Metro Radio Hits Music Awards	Best Mandarin Singer	—N/a	Won	
2007	Metro Radio Hits Music Awards	Outstanding Performance (popular vote)	—N/a	Won	
2007	Hong Kong TVB8 Awards	Top 10 Gold Songs Gold Award	"玩酷" (Play It Cool) from Play It Cool	Won	
2007	Hong Kong TVB8 Awards	Top 10 Gold Songs	"玩酷" (Play It Cool) from Play It Cool	Won	
2007	Hong Kong TVB8 Awards	Most Popular Male Artist (China)	—N/a	Won	
2008	Metro Radio Mandarin Music Awards	Most Popular Idol	—N/a	Won	
2008	Metro Radio Mandarin Music Awards	Asia's Best Idol	—N/a	Won	
2008	Metro Radio Mandarin Music Awards	Best Asia Singer	—N/a	Won	
2009	Metro Radio Mandarin Music Awards	Songs of the Year	"Be With You" feat Akon from 007	Won	
2009	Metro Radio Mandarin Music Awards	Best Original Song	"雙人舞" (Pas de Deux) from 007	Won	
2009	Metro Radio Mandarin Music Awards	Best Asia Singer-Dancer	—N/a	Won	
2011	15th Global Mandarin Chart Music Award 第15屆全球華語榜中榜	Most Popular Male Singer Award (Hong Kong/Taiwan)	—N/a	Won	
2011	15th Global Mandarin Chart Music Award 第15屆全球華語榜中榜	Best Style on Stage	—N/a	Won	
2011	Singapore Hit Awards 2011	Most Popular Male Artiste Award	—N/a	Nominated	
2011	46th Golden Bell Awards	Best Actor	Endless Love	Won	
2012	MY Astro Music Awards 第三屆 MY Astro至尊流行榜頒獎典禮	Best International Male Singer	—N/a	Won	
2012	MY Astro Music Awards 第三屆 MY Astro至尊流行榜頒獎典禮	Best Stage Performer	—N/a	Won	
2012	MY Astro Music Awards 第三屆 MY Astro至尊流行榜頒獎典禮	MY Astro choice for Best International Singer	—N/a	Won	
2012	MY Astro Music Awards 第三屆 MY Astro至尊流行榜頒獎典禮	Top 25 Golden Melodies	"我們都怕痛" (We Are All Afraid of Pain) from 808	Won	
2012	Hito Music Awards	HITO Best Stage Performer	—N/a	Won	
2012	Hito Music Awards	HITO Best Performing Album (HITO 冠軍王)	808	Won	
2012	Hito Music Awards	HITO Top 10 Songs	"U U U" from 808	Won	
2012	5th Mengniu Annual Billboard Music Festival	Singer's Role Model of the Year (年度榜樣歌手)	—N/a	Won	
2012	20th Chinese Music Chart Awards	All Round Artist of the Year (Hong Kong/Taiwan)	—N/a	Won	
2012	20th Chinese Music Chart Awards	Most Popular Male Singer of the Year (Hong Kong/Taiwan)	—N/a	Won	
2012	20th Chinese Music Chart Awards	Golden Melodies of the Year	「24個比利 (The Story of Billy) from The Story of Billy	Won	
2013	3rd Global Chinese Golden Chart Awards 第三屆全球流行音樂金榜	Most Popular Male Singer of the Year	—N/a	Won	
2013	3rd Global Chinese Golden Chart Awards 第三屆全球流行音樂金榜	Best Stage Performer of the Year	—N/a	Won	
2013	3rd Global Chinese Golden Chart Awards 第三屆全球流行音樂金榜	Top 20 Golden Melodies of the Year	「不想醒來」 (Don't Wanna Wake Up) from The Story of Billy	Won	
2013	MY Astro Music Awards	MY Astro choice for Best International Singer	—N/a	Won	
2013	MY Astro Music Awards	Best Stage Performer	—N/a	Won	
2013	MY Astro Music Awards	Top 25 Golden Melodies	"不想醒來" (Don't Wanna Wake Up) from The Story of Billy	Won	
2013	17th Global Mandarin Chart Music Award	Best All Round Male Singer	—N/a	Won	
2013	17th Global Mandarin Chart Music Award	Best Stage Performer	—N/a	Won	
2013	Music Radio China Top Chart Awards 蒙牛綠色心情中國TOP排行榜	Most Popular Male Singer of the Year (Hong Kong/Taiwan)	—N/a	Won	
2013	Music Radio China Top Chart Awards 蒙牛綠色心情中國TOP排行榜	Best Record Producer of the Year (Hong Kong/Taiwan)	—N/a	Won	
2013	Music Radio China Top Chart Awards 蒙牛綠色心情中國TOP排行榜	Golden Melodies of the Year	「24個比利」 (The Story of Billy) from The Story of Billy	Won	
2013	Hito Music Awards	Best Male Dance Artist	—N/a	Won	
2013	Hito Music Awards	Media Award (Male Singer) (全球傳媒推崇男歌手)	—N/a	Won	
2013	Hito Music Awards	Top 10 Mandarin Songs of The Year	「24個比利」 (The Story of Billy) from The Story of Billy	Won	
2013	6th CSC Music Awards	Best Male Singer of The Year	—N/a	Won	
2013	6th CSC Music Awards	CSC Choice for Albums of The Year	The Story of Billy	Won	
2013	6th CSC Music Awards	Top 20 Golden Melodies of the Year	「24個比利 (The Story of Billy) from The Story of Billy	Won	
2013	Global Chinese Music Awards 2013	Outstanding Regional Artiste Award (Taiwan)	—N/a	Won	
2013	Global Chinese Music Awards 2013	Top 20 Hits of the Year	「不想醒來」 (Don't Wanna Wake Up) from The Story of Billy	Won	
2013	Global Chinese Music Awards 2013	Top 5 Most Popular Male Artiste Award	—N/a	Won	
2013	Global Chinese Music Awards 2013	Best Stage Performing Artiste Award	—N/a	Won	
2013	Singapore Hit Awards 2013	Most Popular Male Artiste	—N/a	Nominated	
2013	Singapore Hit Awards 2013	Versatile Male Artiste	—N/a	Won	
2013	Singapore Hit Awards 2013	Charismatic Male Performer	—N/a	Won	
2013	Singapore Hit Awards 2013	Favorite Music Video	「24個比利」 (The Story of Billy) from The Story of Billy	Won	
2013	7th Migu Music Award	Most Popular Male Singer (Hong Kong/Taiwan)	—N/a	Won	
2013	7th Migu Music Award	Top 10 best-selling single downloads	「24個比利」 (The Story of Billy) from The Story of Billy	Won	
2014	2014 MTV Europe Music Awards	Best Taiwanese Act	—N/a	Nominated	
2015	Hito Music Awards	Most Popular Male Singer	—N/a	Won	
2015	Hito Music Awards	HITO Best Duet	"打呼" ("Snore" feat.Rainie Yang) from Crown & Clown	Won	
2015	Hito Music Awards	Top 10 Mandarin Songs of the Year	"打呼" ("Snore" feat.Rainie Yang) from Crown & Clown	Won	
2015	Hito Music Awards	Star Personality Artiste Award (絕對星態度藝人)	—N/a	Won	
2018	Hito Music Awards	Top 10 Mandarin Songs of the Year	"Coming Home" from illi	Won	
2018	Hito Music Awards	Migu Popularity Award	—N/a	Won	
2018	Hito Music Awards	Hito Stage Performer	—N/a	Won	
2018	Hito Music Awards	Hito Star All-Round Artist	—N/a	Won	
2019	Hito Music Awards	Most Popular Digital Single	Moonlight" (feat. Tia Ray)	Won	
