= Kevin Yi =

Taiwanese lyricist

Kevin Yi (or Yee Kar Yeung, Traditional Chinese: 易家揚) is a Taiwanese lyricist best known for his work with Coco Lee, Leehom Wang, A-Mei, Stefanie Sun, JJ Lin, and Khalil Fong. Alongside his work as a lyricist, Yi is a record executive working in Asia with Mandarin-language artists. Yi received a nomination for Golden Melody Award for Best Lyricist and a nomination for Best Original Film Song at the 29th Hong Kong Film Awards.

== Career ==
=== Early career ===
After completing his military service in 1989, Yi Chia-yang joined the marketing department of Rock Records in Taiwan. His early work there included Chief Zhao's song "A Tiny Bird" (我是一隻小小鳥). Later, Yi worked as an A&R representative before joining BMG Music as Marketing and Promotion Director.

=== Songwriting ===
In 2000, Yi wrote the lyrics for the Chinese version of "A Love Before Time," the theme song for the wuxia martial arts film Crouching Tiger, Hidden Dragon. Performed by Coco Lee and featuring Yo-Yo Ma on cello, the English version of the song was nominated for Best Original Song at the 73rd Academy Awards in 2001.

As marketing director at Warner Music, Yi contributed to the debuts of artists Stefanie Sun and Yida Huang. Yi has written lyrics for tracks such as Leehom Wang's "Forever's First Day" (永遠的第一天), A-Mei's "Remember" (記得), Stefanie Sun's "Kite" (風箏), "Love Dictionary" (愛情字典), "Someone Like Me" (同類), "Encounter" (遇見), F.I.R.'s "Crescent Bay" (月牙灣), and Khalil Fong's "Retrospective" (復刻回憶). In 2013, the song Yi wrote for JJ Lin, "Practice Love" (修煉愛情), was awarded Hito Pop Music Best 10 Singles and Singapore Hit Awards Best 10 Singles.

As of 2020, Yi's work included Eason Chan's "Soar" (披風), JJ Lin's "53 Dawns" (黑夜問白天), A-Mei and Sandy Lam's "Double Shadow" (雙影), and Mayday vocalist Ashin's cover of Joi Chua's song "The Hidden Memories" (隱形的紀念).

== Works ==
Year	English title	Chinese title	Performed by
1999	"Man on Wire"	走鋼索的人	James Li
2000	"Forever's Frist Day"	永遠的第一天	Leehom Wang
2001	"Remember"	記得	A-Mei
2001	"By My Side"	遇見	Stefanie Sun
2001	"A Love Before Time"	月光愛人（電影「臥虎藏龍」主題曲）	Coco Lee
2002	"Cruelty"	狠角色	A-Mei
2003	"In Love With the Future You"	愛上未來的你	Will Pan
2004	"Partner"	同類	Stefanie Sun
2004	"Anonymous Baby"	匿名的寶貝	Yida Huang
2004	"Love Song for the Singles"	單身情歌	Terry Lin
2004	"Burning Pain"	燃燒	Sun Nan
2007	"Crescent Bay"	月牙灣	F.I.R.
2008	"Retrospective"	復刻回憶	Fiona Sit, Khalil Fong
2010	"Love is All Right"	愛都是對的	Hu Xia
2012	"Silent Love Song"	無聲情歌	Winnie Hsin、Chyi Chin
2013	"Love Dictionary"	修煉愛情	JJ Lin
2017	"Soar"	披風	Eason Chan
2017	"53 Dawns"	黑夜問白天	JJ Lin
2018	"Double Shadow"	雙影（戲劇「如懿傳」主題曲）	A-Mei, Sandy Lam
2019	"The Hidden Memories"	隱形的紀念	Ashin

== Awards and recognition ==
In 1999, Yi was nominated for the Best Lyricist Award at the 10th Golden Melody Award for his lyrics in "Metro" (地下鐵) performed by Wallace Chung, composed by Samuel Tai.

In 2010, Yi was nominated for the Best Original Film Song at the 29th Hong Kong Film Awards for the song "Mulan Love" (木兰情), which served as the theme song for the film "Hua Mulan."
