= List of awards and nominations received by Show Lo =

This is a list of awards and nominations received by Taiwanese actor and singer Show Lo.

== Golden Bell Awards ==
The Golden Bell Awards (Chinese: 金鐘獎) are television production awards presented annually by the Government Information Office (GIO) of the Republic of China (Taiwan) and is Taiwan's equivalent to the Emmy Award.

Year	#	Category	Nominated work	Result	Ref.
2005	40th	Best Actor in a Television Series	The Outsiders II	Nominated	
2009	44th	Best Actor in a Television Series	Hot Shot	Nominated	
2010	45th	Best Actor in a Television Series	Hi My Sweetheart	Nominated	
2017	52nd	Best Host for a Variety Show	100% Entertainment	Won	

== Golden Melody Awards ==
The Golden Melody Awards (Chinese: 金曲獎; pinyin: Jīn Qǔ Jiǎng) are music production awards presented annually by the Government Information Office of the Republic of China (Taiwan) and is Taiwan's equivalent to the Grammy Awards.

Year	Number	Category	Nomination	Result	Ref.
2007	18th	Most Popular Male Artist (popular vote)	Show Lo	Won	

== Hong Kong TVB8 Awards ==
The Hong Kong TVB8 Awards (Chinese: TVB8金曲榜頒獎) are given annually by TVB8, since 1999, a Mandarin television network operated by Television Broadcasts Limited.

Year	Category	Nomination	Result	Ref.
2004	Top 10 Gold Songs	"Show Time" from Show Time	Won	
2005	Top 10 Gold Songs	"機器娃娃" (Robotic Doll) from Expert Show	Nominated	
2005	Top 10 Gold Songs	"戀愛達人" (Love Expert) from Expert Show	Won	
2005	Most Popular Male Artist (China)	Show Lo	Won	
2006	Top 10 Gold Songs	"真命天子" (Destined Guy) from Hypnosis Show	Nominated	
2006	Top 10 Gold Songs	"自我催眠" (Self-Hypnosis) from Hypnosis Show	Nominated	
2006	Top 10 Gold Songs	"飆汗" (Sweating) with Joey Yung from Jump Up – 9492	Nominated	
2007	Top 10 Gold Songs	"精舞門" (Dance Gate) from Speshow	Nominated	
2007	Top 10 Gold Songs	"幸福獵人" (Happiness Hunter) from Speshow	Nominated	

== HITO Radio Music Awards ==
The HITO Radio Music Awards (Chinese: HITO流行音樂獎) are given annually by HITO Radio, the parent company of Taiwanese radio station Hit FM. The order is not specified for the Top 10 Songs of the Year.

Year	Category	Nomination	Result	Ref.
2007	Top 10 Songs of the Year	"精舞門" (Dance Gate) from Speshow	Won	
2007	Most Popular Male Singer (popular Vote)	Show Lo	Won	
2008	Top 10 Songs of the Year	"一支獨秀" (One Man Show) from Show Your Dance	Won	
2008	iSing99 Karaoke Song Award	"我不會唱歌" (I Don't Know How To Sing) from Show Your Dance	Won	
2008	Most Popular Male Singer (popular Vote)	Show Lo	Won	
2012	Most Popular Male Singer (popular Vote)	Show Lo	Won	

== IFPI Hong Kong Album Sales Awards ==
The IFPI Hong Kong Album Sales Awards (Chinese: IFPI香港唱片銷量大獎), formerly Gold Record Awards (金唱片頒獎典禮) is presented by the Hong Kong branch of International Federation of the Phonographic Industry (IFPI) since 1977. The order is not specified for the Top 10 Selling Mandarin Albums of the Year (十大銷量國語唱片獲獎).

Year	Category	Nomination	Result	Ref.
2008	Top 10 Selling Mandarin Albums of the Year	Show Your Dance	Won	
2008	Top 10 Selling Mandarin Albums of the Year	Show On Cruel Stage Concert Live	Won	
2009	Top 10 Selling Mandarin Albums of the Year	Trendy Man	Won	
2010	Top 10 Selling Mandarin Albums of the Year	Rashomon	Won	
2011	Top 10 Selling Mandarin Albums of the Year	Only For You	Won	

== Metro Radio Mandarin Music Awards ==
The Metro Radio Mandarin Music Awards (Chinese: 新城國語力頒獎禮) are given annually since 2002, by Hong Kong radio station Metro Info. No order of ranking is specified for the Songs of the Year.

Year	Category	Nomination	Result	Ref.
2004	Leap Forward Singer (躍進歌手獎)	Show Lo	Won	
2004	New Influence Male Singer (新勢力男歌手獎)	Show Lo	Won	
2005	Songs of the Year	"機器娃娃" (Robotic Doll) from Expert Show	Won	
2005	Best Male Singer-Dancer	Show Lo	Won	
2005	Asia's Best Idol Singer	Show Lo	Won	
2006	Best Male Singer	Show Lo	Nominated	
2006	Songs of the Year	"自我催眠" (Self-Hypnosis) from Hypnosis Show	Nominated	
2006	Songs of the Year	"真命天子" (Destined Guy) from Hypnosis Show	Won	
2006	Best Singer-Dancer	Show Lo	Won	
2006	Best Partnership	Show Lo and Joey Yung for "飆汗" (Sweating) from Jump Up – 9492	Won	
2006	Asia's Best Singer	Show Lo	Won	
2006	Most Popular Idol	Show Lo	Won	
2007	Songs of the Year	"好朋友" (Good Friends) from Speshow	Nominated	
2007	Songs of the Year	"精舞門" (Dance Gate) from Speshow	Nominated	
2007	Songs of the Year	"飆汗" (Sweating) with Joey Yung from Jump Up – 9492	Won	
2008	Songs of the Year	"一支獨秀" (One Man Show) from Show Your Dance	Won	
2008	Best Male Singer (Overseas)	Show Lo	Won	
2008	Best Stage Award	Show Lo	Won	
2008	Best Asia Singer	Show Lo	Won	
2009	Songs of the Year	"撐腰" (Waist Support) from Trendy Man	Won	
2009	Best Male Singer	Show Lo	Won	
2009	Best Asia Singer-Dancer	Show Lo	Won	
2009	World-wide Extreme Stage Performance 全球至尊舞台大獎	Show Lo	Won	
2010	World-wide Singer-Dancer	Show Lo	Won	
2012	Songs of the Year	Show Lo	Won	
2012	Top Global Sales Record	Show Lo	Won	
2012	Country's Most Popular Singer	Show Lo	Won	
2012	Most Supreme Singer	Show Lo	Won	
2012	Most Popular Couple	Show Lo and Rainie Yang	Won	

== Metro Radio Hit Awards ==
The Metro Radio Hit Awards (Chinese: 新城勁爆頒獎禮), like the Metro Radio Mandarin Music Awards, are given annually (usually in December) by Hong Kong radio station Metro Info. In contrast to the Mandarin Music Awards, the Hit Awards focuses on Cantopop music, and provide a few honours for Mandarin-language music.

Year	Category	Nomination	Result	Ref.
2005	Mandarin Singer Grand Prize	Show Lo	Won	
2005	Singer-Dancer Grand Prize (跳唱歌手大獎)	Show Lo	Won	
2007	Mandarin Singer (國語歌手)	Show Lo	Won	
2007	Mandarin Song Grand Prize	"一支獨秀" (One Man Show) from Show Your Dance	Won	
2007	Singer-Dancer Grand Prize	Show Lo	Won	

== Other awards ==
Year	Award	Category	Nomination	Result	Ref.
2004	2nd South-East Music Chart Awards 第二屆東南勁爆音樂榜	Beat New Male Artist (HK/Taiwan) 港台地區勁爆最有前途新人男歌手獎	Show Lo	Won	
2004	Sprite My Choice Chinese Music Chart 雪碧我的選擇中國原創音樂流行榜	Golden Melody - HK/Taiwan		Won	
2004	Music Pioneer Chart 音樂先鋒榜	Most Popular New Male Artist - Taiwan (Gold)	Show Lo	Won	
2005	2nd Hit Song King Awards 第二屆勁歌王總選頒獎	Top 10 Mandarin Song	"機器娃娃" (Robotic Doll) from Expert Show	Won	
2005	2nd Hit Song King Awards 第二屆勁歌王總選頒獎	Outstanding Young Singer (Taiwan)	Show Lo	Won	
2005	2nd Hit Song King Awards 第二屆勁歌王總選頒獎	Best New Male Artist (Taiwan)	Show Lo	Won	
2005	2nd Hit Song King Awards 第二屆勁歌王總選頒獎	All-Round Artist	Show Lo	Won	
2005	3rd South-East Music Chart Awards 第三屆東南勁爆音樂榜	Heavenly King Successor 天王接班人大獎	Show Lo	Won	
2005	3rd South-East Music Chart Awards 第三屆東南勁爆音樂榜	Top 10 Gold Songs (Taiwan)	"機器娃娃" (Robotic Doll) from Expert Show	Won	
2005	Channel V Chinese Music Award	Most Popular Song of Year	"戀愛達人" (Love Expert) from Expert Show	Won	
2005	MTV Super Magnificent Ceremony	Full Style Artist Award	Show Lo	Won	
2005	China Wu Xi	Colorful Music Award	Show Lo	Won	
2005	KKBOX Online Music Award	Top 10 Karaoke Songs	"自我催眠" (Self-Hypnosis)	Won	
2005	KKBOX Online Music Award	Top 10 Artists of Year	Show Lo	Won	
2006	MTV Mandarin Awards @ Taiwan	People's Choice Award	Show Lo	Won	
2006	TVBS Chinese Music Awards	Best Leap Forward Singer	Show Lo	Won	
2006	TVBS Chinese Music Awards	Best Stage Modeling Award	Show Lo	Won	
2006	TVBS Chinese Music Awards	Most Popular Omni-Bearing Male Singer	Show Lo	Won	
2007	MTV Video Music Awards Japan	Best Buzz Asia in Taiwan	Show Lo	Nominated	
2007	7th Global Chinese Music Chart	Top 5 Popular Male Artists	Show Lo	Won	
2007	7th Global Chinese Music Chart	Top 20 Popular Gold Songs	"精舞門" (Dance Gate) from Speshow	Won	
2007	7th Global Chinese Music Chart	Best Stage Performer	Show Lo	Won	
2007	7th Global Chinese Music Chart	Most Outstanding Artist (Taiwan)	Show Lo	Won	
2007	4th Hit Song King Awards 第四屆勁歌王	Top 10 songs of the Year	"愛＊轉角" (Love＊Corner) from Speshow	Won	
2007	4th Hit Song King Awards 第四屆勁歌王	Most Popular Artist (Taiwan)	Show Lo	Won	
2007	4th Hit Song King Awards 第四屆勁歌王	Outstanding Young Artist	Show Lo	Won	
2008	Music Radio TOP Charts	Most Popular Male Artist (HK/Taiwan)	Show Lo	Won	
2008	Music Radio TOP Charts	Best Stage Performer of the Year (HK/Taiwan)	Show Lo	Won	
2008	MTV Asia Awards	Favorite Artist of Taiwan	Show Lo	Won	
2008	8th Global Chinese Music Chart	Favorite Male Singer	Show Lo	Won	
2008	8th Global Chinese Music Chart	Top 20 Popular Gold Songs	"敗給你" (Lost To You)	Won	
2008	8th Global Chinese Music Chart	Best Stage Performer	Show Lo	Won	
2009	Singapore Entertainment Awards	Most Popular Male Singer	Show Lo	Won	
2009	Singapore Entertainment Awards	Most Stylish Hunk	Show Lo	Won	
2009	Singapore Entertainment Awards	SPH Media Award- Best Artiste Of The Year (All-Round)	Show Lo	Won	
2009	6th Hit Song King Awards 第六屆勁歌王	Hit Song King	Show Lo	Won	
2009	2009 Yahoo! Asia Buzz Awards (Taiwan)	Male Singer	Show Lo	Won	
2010	Baidu annual Hot Point Awards	Most popular entertainer	Show Lo	Won	
2010	14th Annual Global Mandarin Chart Music Award 第14屆全球華語榜中榜	Best Stage (Presentation) Award		Won	
2010	14th Annual Global Mandarin Chart Music Award 第14屆全球華語榜中榜	Most Popular Male Artist Award	Show Lo	Won	
2010	Singapore Entertainment Awards	Most Popular Male Singer	Show Lo	Won	
2010	Next Magazine 1st Entertainment Award Ceremony 第一届壹周刊娱乐大赏颁奖典礼	Top 10 Most Popular Artist Award	Show Lo	Won	
2010	Next Magazine 1st Entertainment Award Ceremony 第一届壹周刊娱乐大赏颁奖典礼	Most Popular Singer Award	Show Lo	Won	
2010	Singapore Hit Awards 新加坡金曲獎	Most Popular Male Artiste	Show Lo	Won	
2010	Channel [V] Taiwan Music Billboard Annual Awards 音樂飆榜年度頒獎	Top 20 Songs of the Year	"愛不單行" (You Won't Be Alone) from Rashomon	Won	
2010	Channel [V] Taiwan Music Billboard Annual Awards 音樂飆榜年度頒獎	Most Popular Male Artist	Show Lo	Won	
2011	Next Magazine Entertainment Awards	Top 10 Artists of the Year	Show Lo	Won	
2011	MTV Mandarin Music Awards	Male Artist of the Year	Show Lo	Won	
2011	MTV Mandarin Music Awards	Asia Artist of the Year	Show Lo	Won	
2011	MTV Mandarin Music Awards	Top 10 Artists of the Year	Show Lo	Won	
2011	Yahoo! Taiwan	Most Popular Male Artist	Show Lo	Won	
2011	Yahoo! Taiwan	Most Influential Artist	Show Lo	Won	
2012	KKBOX Online Awards	Top 10 Artists of the Year	Show Lo	Won	
2012	Next Magazine Entertainment Awards	Top 10 Artists of the Year	Show Lo	Won	
