= In the Family =

In the Family may refer to:

- In the Family (1971 film), a 1971 Brazilian film
- In the Family (2008 film), a 2008 documentary film
- In the Family (2011 film), a 2011 drama film
- In the Family (TV series), a 2017 Taiwanese TV drama
- In the Family (magazine), a magazine published by Family Magazine, Inc.
