= Best Show =

- Best Show Collectible Edition cover

Greatest hits album by Show Lo
- Released: 2 November 2007
- Genre: Mandopop
- Language: Mandarin
- Label: Avex Taiwan

Show Lo chronology
Speshow (2006)	Best Show (2007)	Show Your Dance (2007)

Alternative cover

Best Show is Taiwanese Mandopop artist Show Lo's first Mandarin greatest hits album. It was released by Avex Taiwan after his departure from the label and before his first release Show Your Dance with EMI Music Taiwan. It includes songs from Show's four albums released by Avex Taiwan, from his debut album Show Time in 2003 to Speshow in 2006.

Two editions were released on 2 November 2007: Best Show Superstar Edition (Best Show 勁舞天王版) and Best Show Collectible Edition (Best Show 最愛珍藏版), both containing the same 15 tracks but each with a different bonus track and a DVD with different content.

== Track listing ==
1. "精舞門" Jing Wu Men (The Dance Gate)
2. "嗆司嗆司" Qiang Si Qiang Si (Chance Chance)
3. "幸福獵人" Xing Fu Lie Ren (Happiness Hunter)
4. "黑眼圈" Hei Yan Quan (Dark Eye Circles)
5. "戀愛達人" Lian Ai Da Ren (Love Expert) - feat Dee Shu
6. "狐狸精" Hu Li Jing (Seductress)
7. "力量" Li Liang (Strength)
8. "自我催眠" Zi Wo Cui Mian (Self-Hypnosis) - composed by Jay Chou
9. "機器娃娃" Ji Qi Wa Wa (Robotic Doll)
10. "淘汰郎" Tao Tai Lang (Eliminated Man)
11. "小丑魚" Xiao Chou Yu (Clown Fish)
12. "好朋友" Hao Peng You (Good Friends)
13. "愛＊轉角" Ai Zhuan Jiao (Love＊Corner) - ending theme of Corner With Love
14. "猛男日記" Meng Nan Ri Ji (Diary of a Muscle Man)
15. "Twinkle" - feat Kumi Koda

Bonus track:

- "勁舞Show" (Dance Show - new remix) - Superstar Edition
- "最愛Show" (Love Show - new remix) - Collectible Edition

== Bonus DVD ==
Best Show Superstar Edition - Karaoke + MV

1. "精舞門" Jing Wu Men (The Dance Gate) MV
2. "嗆司嗆司" Qiang Si Qiang Si (Chance Chance) MV - cameo by Luo Ma Ma
3. "幸福獵人" Xing Fu Lie Ren (Happiness Hunter) MV
4. "黑眼圈" Hei Yan Quan (Dark Eye Circles) MV
5. "戀愛達人" Lian Ai Da Ren (Love Expert) MV - feat Dee Shu
6. "狐狸精" Hu Li Jing (Seductress) MV
7. "力量" Li Liang (Strength) MV
8. "自我催眠" Zi Wo Cui Mian (Self-Hypnosis) MV - feat Barbie Shu
9. "機器娃娃" Ji Qi Wa Wa (Robotic Doll) MV
10. "淘汰郎" Tao Tai Lang (Eliminated Man) MV
11. "小丑魚" Xiao Chou Yu (Clown Fish) MV - feat Rainie Yang
12. "好朋友" Hao Peng You (Good Friends) MV - feat Ariel Lin
13. "愛＊轉角" Ai Zhuan Jiao (Love＊Corner) MV - feat clips from Corner With Love
14. "猛男日記" Meng Nan Ri Ji (Diary of a Muscle Man) MV
15. "Twinkle" MV - feat Kumi Koda

Best Show Collectible Edition

- Show Lo documentary (舞台霸王羅志祥成長全紀錄) - includes footage from his Four Heavenly Kings years (1996–1998) and behind-the-scene footage from 2003-2006 (55 mins)
