= Tokyo Juliet =

Tokyo Juliet may refer to:

- Tokyo Juliet (manga), a Japanese manga series
- Tokyo Juliet (TV series), a Taiwanese television series based on the manga
