= Speshow =

- Speshow cover

Studio album by Show Lo
- Released: 17 November 2006
- Recorded: 24 October 2006
- Genre: Mandopop, Dance
- Length: 42:59
- Language: Mandarin
- Label: Avex Taiwan

Show Lo chronology
Hypnosis Show (2005)	Speshow (2006)	Best Show (2007)

Alternative cover

Speshow is the fourth Mandarin studio album of Taiwanese Mandopop artist Show Lo (Chinese: 羅志祥). It was released on 17 November 2006 by Avex Taiwan. The name Speshow is a pun of 'Special' and his name 'Show', as he hoped it will be special for his fans. This is the last studio album of Show's, released by Avex Taiwan before his move to EMI Music Taiwan.

It was available on pre-order and four editions were released, which includes Speshow (Happiness Hunter MV Celebration Edition) (Speshow 幸福獵人影音慶功版), Speshow (Corner with Love Special Edition) (Speshow 愛*轉角 冠軍特別版) and Speshow (King's Game Live Gold Edition) (Speshow 國王遊戲LIVE黃金版) with 60 minutes of highlight live footage from Show Lo BenQ Speshow Concert at Taipei NanGang101.

== Album ==
- The first lead track, "精舞門" (Dance Gate), is a cover of "James Dean (I Wanna Know)" by Daniel Bedingfield. The music video features multiple dance styles and a special chair dance, leading to Show being dubbed "Asia's Dance King"
- "Twinkle", an up-tempo track is a duet with Japanese singer Kumi Koda (倖田來未) and is Show's first full length English song
- Simon Webbe, of British boy band Blue fame, rapped in the mid-tempo dance track, "國王遊戲" (King's Game)
- The track "自戀" (Narcissism) is composed by Show and was used as the DVD preview theme song for Taiwanese film Eternal Summer (Chinese: 盛夏光年). The music video is interspaced with clips from the film featuring Joseph Chang, Bryant Chang and Kate Yeung
- The romantic ballads "愛＊轉角" (Love＊Corner) is the ending theme song and "幾分" (How Many Points) is an insert song of Taiwanese drama, Corner With Love (轉角＊遇到愛), starring Luo and Barbie Shu, which were not released on the Corner With Love original soundtrack. The music video is interspaced with clips from the drama, featuring Hsu, and concert footage
- Along with Show, Ariel Lin starred in the music video for "好朋友" (Good Friends) as a runaway bride to her 'good friend' Show Lo

== Reception ==
The album debuted at number one on Taiwan's G-Music Weekly Top 20 Mandarin and Combo Charts, and Five Music Chart. with a percentage sales of 25.56%, 13.65% and 27.64% respectively. It peaked at number one and charted continuously in the Mandarin Chart for 27 weeks, the Combo Chart for 18 weeks and the 5 Music Chart for 20 weeks.

The tracks, "好朋友" (Good Friends) and "精舞門" (Dance Gate) are listed at number 45 and 71 respectively on Hit Fm Taiwan's Hit Fm Annual Top 100 Singles Chart (Hit-Fm年度百首單曲) for 2006; as well as both being nominated for Songs of the Year at the 2007 Metro Radio Mandarin Music Awards presented by Hong Kong radio station Metro Info.

The track "精舞門" (Dance Gate) also won one of the Top 10 Songs of the Year at the 2007 HITO Radio Music Awards presented by Taiwanese radio station Hit FM. It was also nominated, along with "幸福獵人" (Happiness Hunter) for Top 10 Gold Songs at the Hong Kong TVB8 Awards, presented by television station TVB8, in 2007.

== Track listing ==
#	Original Title	Pinyin	English	Remarks	Length
1.	"精舞門"	Jing Wu Men	Dance Gate		3:44
2.	"幸福獵人"	Xing Fu Lie Ren	Happiness Hunter		3:39
3.	"完美型男"	Wan Mei Xing Nan	Perfect Man		4:24
4.	"好朋友"	Hao Peng You	Good Friends		4:03
5.	"幾分"	Ji Fen	How Many Points	insert song of Corner With Love	4:08
6.	"Twinkle"			feat Kumi Koda and sung in English	3:53
7.	"碎碎念"	Sui Sui Nian	Nagging		4:27
8.	"透視"	Tou Shi	X-Ray Vision		2:57
9.	"國王遊戲"	Guo Wang You Xi	King's Game	feat Simon Webbe	3:10
10.	"自戀"	Zi Lian	Narcissism	composed by Show Lo	4:08
11.	"垃圾桶"	La Ji Tong	Trash Can		4:25
	"愛＊轉角"	Ai Zhuan Jiao	Love＊Corner	ending theme of Corner With Love and bonus track on Speshow (Corner with Love Special Edition)	4:55

== Music videos ==
- "精舞門" (The Dance Gate) MV with a special chair dance
- "Twinkle" MV - feat Kumi Koda (倖田來未)
- "好朋友" (Good Friends) MV - feat Ariel Lin - Lin plays a runaway bride, who escapes to her good friend Show's home on her wedding day. However they don't have the courage to face up to their feelings for each other, hence settles for the safe option of being 'good friends'.
- "幸福獵人" (Happiness Hunter) MV
- "國王遊戲" (King's Game) MV
- "自戀" (Narcissism) MV - with clips from Eternal Summer featuring Joseph Chang, Bryant Chang and Kate Yeung
- "愛＊轉角" (Love＊Corner) MV - with clips from Corner With Love, featuring Barbie Shu, and concert footage

== Releases ==
Four versions (excludes pre-order editions) were released by Avex Taiwan:

- 17 November 2006 - Speshow Preorder Edition (CD) - includes gifts
- 17 November 2006 - Speshow (CD)
- 8 December 2006 - Speshow (Happiness Hunter MV Celebration Edition) (Speshow 幸福獵人影音慶功版) (CD+DVD) - includes three music videos and a pass to Show Lo BenQ Speshow Concert [羅志祥 BenQ Speshow 演唱會])
1. "精舞門" (The Dance Gate) MV
2. "好朋友" (Good Friends) MV - feat Ariel Lin
3. "幸福獵人" (Happiness Hunter) MV
- 12 January 2007 - Speshow (Corner with Love Special Edition) (Speshow 愛*轉角 冠軍特別版) (CD+DVD) - includes a bonus track and three music videos
1. "愛＊轉角" (Love＊Corner) - bonus track
2. "愛＊轉角" (Love＊Corner) MV - feat Barbie Shu
3. "自戀" (Narcissism) MV - feat Joseph Chang, Bryant Chang and Kate Yeung
4. "Twinkle" MV - feat Kumi Koda (倖田來未)
- 16 February 2007 - Speshow (King's Game Live Gold Edition) (Speshow 國王遊戲LIVE黃金版) (CD+DVD) - includes "國王遊戲" (King's Game) MV and 60 mins of highlight live footage from Show Lo BenQ Speshow Concert (BenQ羅志祥Speshow 演唱會Live精華版) at Taipei NanGang101 on 30 December 2006

== Charts ==
Chart Name	Debut Position	Week# / Week Dates of Peak Position	Peak Position	Percentage of Album Sales at Peak	Chart Run
Five Music Taiwan; 5大金榜	#1	#47 / 17–23 November 2006	#1	27.64%	20 weeks
G-Music Mandarin Chart, Taiwan 風雲榜 (華語榜)	#1	#46 / 17–23 November 2006	#1	25.56%	27 weeks
G-Music Combo Chart, Taiwan 風雲榜 (綜合榜)	#1	#46 / 17–23 November 2006	#1	13.65%	18 weeks

Hit Fm Annual Top 100 Singles Chart - 2006
Track name	Position
"好朋友" (Good Friends)	#45
"精舞門" (Dance Gate)	#71
