= Blissful Encounter =

- Blissful Encounter cover

Studio album 幸福遇見 by Ariel Lin
- Released: 10 July 2009
- Genre: Mandopop
- Language: Mandarin
- Label: Avex Taiwan

Ariel Lin chronology
Blissful Encounter (2009)	A Wonderful Journey (2010)

Blissful Encounter (Chinese: 幸福遇見; pinyin: Xìngfú Yùjiàn) is Taiwanese Mandopop artist Ariel Lin's (Chinese: 林依晨) debut Mandarin solo studio album. It was released on 10 July 2009 by Avex Taiwan. On 21 August 2009, Avex Taiwan released another edition with a bonus DVD containing two music videos and Korean version of "惡作劇" (Practical Joke).

The album features the ending theme song for Taiwanese drama Love or Bread, "麵包的滋味" (The Taste of Bread), and Ariel's version of "惡作劇" (Practical Joke), ending theme song for It Started with a Kiss. The music video for "螢火蟲" (Firefly) features Donghae and Siwon of South Korean boy band Super Junior.

The track "螢火蟲" (Firefly) is listed at number 84 on Hit Fm Taiwan's Hit Fm Annual Top 100 Singles Chart for 2009.

== Track listing ==
1. "淚光雨" Lèi guāng yǔ (Tears in the Rain)
2. "螢火蟲" Yínghuǒchóng (Firefly)
3. "Come to Me"
4. "依靠" Yī kào (Rely On)
5. "你的味道" Nǐ de wèidào (Your Flavor)
6. "接近無限的藍" Jiējìn wúxiàn de lán (Closer to the Unlimited Blue)
7. "惡作劇" Èzuòjù (Practical Joke)
8. "甜蜜花園" Tiánmì huāyuán (Sweet Garden)
9. "麵包的滋味" Miànbāo de zīwèi (The Taste of Bread)
10. "愛" Ài (Love)
11. "장난치기" (惡作劇) Èzuòjù (Practical Joke) - Blissful Encounter (CD+DVD) - bonus track

== Music video ==
- "甜蜜花園" (Sweet Garden)
- "螢火蟲" (Firefly) - feat Donghae and Siwon of Super Junior

== Releases ==
- 10 July 2009 - Blissful Encounter (Regular Edition) (幸福遇見)
- 21 August 2009 - Blissful Encounter (CD+DVD) (幸福遇見 CD+DVD) - with DVD containing:
1. "甜蜜花園" (Sweet Garden) MV
2. "螢火蟲" (Firefly) MV
3. "螢火蟲" (Firefly) Summer Story
