= Kitagawa =

Kitagawa (written: 北川 or 喜多川) is a Japanese surname. Notable people with the surname include:

- Asami Kitagawa, Olympic swimmer
- Fuyuhiko Kitagawa, poet and film critic
- Ichitarō Kitagawa, famous woodblock artist and painter who later changed his name to Yusuke and Utamaro
- Issei Kitagawa, politician
- Johnny (Hiromu) Kitagawa (1931–2019), boy band promoter
- Joseph Kitagawa, historian of religions, dean of University of Chicago Divinity School in the 1970s
- Kazuo Kitagawa, cabinet minister of forestry in Japan
- Keiichi Kitagawa, biker
- Keiko Kitagawa, actress/model
- Kiyoshi Kitagawa (1958–2026), Japanese-American jazz double bassist
- Kohei Kitagawa (北川 滉平; born 1995), Japanese footballer
- Mary Kitagawa, Canadian educator
- Masao Kitagawa (1910–1995), botanist
- Miyuki Kitagawa, manga writer, such as Ano Ko ni 1000%
- Rio Kitagawa, singer and member of the j-pop group Morning Musume
- Susumu Kitagawa (born 1951), Japanese chemist
- Takurō Kitagawa, voice actor of Sigma Seven
- Tomokatsu Kitagawa, politician
- Tomoki Kitagawa (北川 智規; born 1983), former Japanese rugby union player
- Tsutomu Kitagawa, actor and stunt man
- Yonehiko Kitagawa, voice actor
- Yoshio Kitagawa, football player
- Mary Yasuko Fujishima (born Mary Kitagawa, 1927-2021), Japanese businessperson, manager, and promoter

== Fictional characters ==
- Jun Kitagawa (Kanon) from Kanon
- Kenta Kitagawa from Digimon Tamers
- Marin Kitagawa from My Dress-Up Darling
- Yusuke Kitagawa from Persona 5

== See also ==
- Kitagawa, Kōchi prefecture
- Kitagawa, Miyazaki prefecture
- Tosa-Kitagawa Station
