= Show on Cruel Stage =

- Show on Cruel Stage cover

Video 殘酷舞台真實錄 by Show Lo
- Released: 11 July 2008
- Recorded: 17–18 November 2007
- Genre: Mandopop, Dance
- Length: 180:00
- Language: Mandarin
- Label: EMI Music Taiwan

Show Lo chronology
Show Your Dance (2007)	Show on Cruel Stage (2008)	Trendy Man (2008)

Show on Cruel Stage (Chinese: 殘酷舞台真實錄) is Taiwanese Mandopop artist Show Lo's first concert DVD album. It was released on 11 July 2008 by EMI Music Taiwan. It was recorded during the 2007 Show Lo (Show On Stage) World Tour (一支獨SHOW 世界巡迴演唱會) concerts held on 17 and 18 November 2007 at Taipei Arena, Taiwan.

The album features songs from his first five studio albums, from his debut album, Show Time in 2003 to Show Your Dance in 2007. It also includes dance performances with guests Karen Mok on the 17th and Rainie Yang on the 18th, as well as Show's performance of tracks by Cantopop artist Alex To and Aaron Kwok. The duets with guests Jolin Tsai "天空" (Sky) on the 17th and Elva Hsiao "敗給你" (Lost To You) on the 18th, were not included due to copyright and technical issues.

The album debuted at number one on Taiwan's G-Music Weekly Top 20 Audio/Video Chart (影音榜) at week 28 (11–17 July 2008) with a percentage sales of 38.02%. It peaked at number one for four week and charted in the Top 20 for 61 weeks.

The album was awarded one of the Top 10 Selling Mandarin Albums of the Year at the 2008 IFPI Hong Kong Album Sales Awards, presented by the Hong Kong branch of IFPI.

== Track listing ==
=== DVD 1 ===
1. VCR - Cruel Stage (殘酷舞台)
2. "國王遊戲" Guo Wang You Xi (King's Game)
3. "嗆司嗆司" Qiang Si Qiang Si (Chance Chance)
4. "一支獨秀" Yi Zhi Du Xiu (One Man Show)
5. "敢不敢" / "碎碎念" Gan Bu Gan (Do You Dare?) / Sui Sui Nian (Nagging)
6. "小丑魚" Xiao Chou Yu (Clown Fish) + talk
7. "真命天子" Zhen Ming Tian Zi (Destined Guy)
8. Guests: Karen Mok & Rainie Yang - dance
9. VCR - Road to Dancing King (舞王之路)
10. "拯救地球" (Save the Earth) - Mandarin song by Alex To
11. "狂野之城" (Wild City) - Cantonese song by Aaron Kwok
12. "精舞門" Jing Wu Men (Dance Gate)
13. VCR - Papa, Mama and Show (爸爸。媽媽。祥祥)
14. "幾分" Ji Fen (How Many Points) - insert song of Corner With Love
15. "灰色空間" Hui Se Kong Jian (Grey Dimension) - ending theme of Outsiders II
16. "自我催眠" Zi Wo Cui Mian (Self-Hypnosis) - composed by Jay Chou

=== DVD 2 ===
1. VCR - Impossible Love (找不到的幸福)
2. "愛＊轉角" Ai Zhuan Jiao (Love＊Corner) - ending theme of Corner With Love
3. "好朋友" Hao Peng You (Good Friends)
4. "我不會唱歌" Wo Bu Hui Chang Ge (I Don't Know How To Sing)
5. VCR - Extended Family (第二名的家人)
6. "機器娃娃" Ji Qi Wa Wa (Robotic Doll)
7. "Show Time"
8. "蝴蝶秀" Hu Die Xiu (Lipodustrophy)
9. "狐狸精" Hu Li Jing (Seductress)
10. "幸福獵人" Xing Fu Lie Ren (Happiness Hunter)
11. "戀愛達人" Lian Ai Da Ren (Love Expert)

Special bonus

1. "我秀故我在" Wo Xiu Gu Wo Zai (I Dance, Therefore I Am) MV
2. Remix Show MV - "蝴蝶秀" (Lipodustrophy) / "一支獨秀" (One Man Show) / "精舞門" (Dance Gate)
