= Michael Shernoff =

American psychotherapist

- Born: March 31, 1951; Queens, New York, US
- Died: June 17, 2008 (aged 57); Manhattan, New York
- Education: Binghamton University; State University of New York at Stony Brook
- Occupation: Psychotherapist

Michael Shernoff (March 31, 1951 – June 17, 2008) was an American openly gay psychotherapist who specialized in serving the mental health needs of gay, lesbian, and bisexual people and was author of several influential publications on the topics of HIV/AIDS prevention and the mental health concerns of gay men.

== Biography ==
Shernoff was born in Queens, New York, on March 31, 1951. He attended New York City schools. He graduated from the Harpur College at Binghamton University and in 1977 received a master's degree in social work from the School of Social Welfare of the State University of New York at Stony Brook.

As a licensed clinical social worker, he offered outpatient mental health services in Chelsea in New York City. He also taught at Hunter College from 1991 to 2001, and from 2002 until his retirement in 2006 he served on the faculty of the Columbia University School of Social Work. From 1997 until 2004 he was the online mental health expert for the HIV/AIDS website TheBody.com.

He was diagnosed as HIV-positive in 1982, but lived free of AIDS symptoms. At the time of his death from pancreatic cancer in Manhattan in June 2008, his brother Jeffrey Shernoff told The New York Times that he found it ironic that after years of living with HIV infection, "He died of pancreatic cancer, which may not even be related."

== Professional contributions ==
Shernoff was an early volunteer for Gay Men's Health Crisis and became one of the first social workers in the United States to address AIDS in a private psychotherapy practice. He wrote many articles and offered training for both mental health professionals and patients on dealing with mental health aspects of gay sexuality and living with HIV and AIDS. In 1985 he and Luis Palacios-Jiménez created the workshop "Hot, Horny and Healthy: Eroticizing Gay Sex" for a Gay Men's Health Crisis conference. The workshop, intended to teach gay men how to continue to engage in sexual activity without risking HIV transmission, was eventually presented in cities across North America. A pamphlet that he co-authored, When a Friend Has AIDS, was translated into eight languages.

Shernoff produced, following the AIDS death of a partner, an anthology entitled Gay Widowers: Life after the Death of a Partner that ten years later was described as still being the only book to address the specific challenges of grief for gay men having lost their partners.

== Bibliography ==
=== Books ===
- Michael Shernoff and William Scott, editors, The Sourcebook on Lesbian/Gay Health Care, published by The National Lesbian/Gay Health Foundation, Washington, D.C., 1988, 425 pages, ISBN 978-0-9621128-0-5
- Michael Shernoff, editor, Counseling Chemically Dependent People With HIV Illness, published by Harrington Park Press, Binghamton, N.Y., 1992, ISBN 978-1-56023-016-8
- Walt Odets and Michael Shernoff, editors, Second Decade of Aids: A Mental Health Practice Handbook, Hatherleigh Press, 1995, 320 pages, ISBN 978-1-886330-00-9
- Michael Shernoff, editor, Human Services for Gay People, Taylor & Francis, Inc., 1996, 138 pages, ISBN 978-1-56024-754-8
- Michael Shernoff, editor, Gay Widowers: Life after the Death of a Partner, Haworth Press, 1997, 161 pages, ISBN 978-1-56023-105-9
- Michael Shernoff, editor, AIDS and Mental Health Practice: Clinical and Policy Issues, Taylor & Francis, Inc., 1999, 381 pages, ISBN 978-0-7890-0464-2
- Michael Shernoff and Raymond Smith, HIV Treatment: Mental Health Aspects of Antiviral Therapy, published by University of California San Francisco AIDS Health Project, 2000, ISBN 978-1-879168-04-6
- Michael Shernoff, Without Condoms: Unprotected Sex, Gay Men and Barebacking, published by Routledge, 2005, 371 pages, ISBN 978-0-415-95024-4

=== Articles ===
- Stephan L. Buckingham and Michael Shernoff, Psychosocial Interventions in Persons with HIV-Associated Neuropsychiatric Compromise, In: A Mental Health Practitioner's Guide to the Neuropsychiatric Complications of HIV/AIDS, Guilford Publications; W. Van Gorp & S. Buckingham (Eds.), 1998
- Michael Shernoff, AIDS: The Therapist's Journey, in A Perilous Calling: The Hazards of Psychotherapy Practice, M. Sussman, Editor, 1994: John Wiley & Sons
- Michael Shernoff, Waiting for the Second Wave of Queer Psychotherapy, In The Family magazine, July 1996
- Michael Shernoff, Physicians Living with HIV/AIDS, The Journal of the International Association of Physicians in AIDS Care, Volume 2, No. 11, November, 1996
- Michael Shernoff, Gay Marriage and Gay Widowhood, The Harvard Gay & Lesbian Review, V. IV, No.4, Fall 1997
- Michael Shernoff, Getting Started: Basic Skills for Effective Social Work with People with HIV and AIDS, In: HIV and Social Work: A Practitioner's Guide, David M. Aronstein and Bruce J. Thompson, Editors, 1998, The Haworth Press, Binghamton, N.Y.
- Michael Shernoff, Monogamy and Gay Men, Family Therapy Networker, March/April 1999
- Michael Shernoff, Condomless Sex: Mental Health Issues in Working With Gay Men Who have Unprotected Anal Intercourse, 5 Boroughs AIDS Mental Health Alliance, V. 5, No 3, Fall 2003
- Michael Shernoff, Gay Men and Unsafe Sex: Beyond a Knee Jerk Reaction, Social Work Today, V.3, No 17, December 2003
- Michael Shernoff, Dial-Up Gay Culture: What We Lose and What We Gain in the New Queer Zeitgeist, In the family magazine, V.10, No 4, April 2005

== See also ==
- Long-term nonprogressors
