= Tokyo Juliet (TV series) =

- Promo poster
- Also known as: 東方茱麗葉, Dong Fang Zhu Lì Ye
- 東方茱麗葉
- Genre: Romance, Comedy
- Based on: Tokyo Juliet by Miyuki Kitagawa
- Directed by: Ming Tai Wang (王明台)
- Starring: Ariel Lin 林依晨; Wu Chun 吳尊; Simon Yam 任達華
- Opening theme: Upwind 逆風 by Garden Sister 花園精靈
- Ending theme: That's You Without a Doubt 非你莫屬 by Ariel Lin 林依晨
- Country of origin: Republic of China (Taiwan)
- Original language: Mandarin
- No. of episodes: 17

Production
- Producer: Huang Wan Bo 黃萬伯
- Production locations: Taipei, Taiwan
- Running time: 90 mins (Sundays at 10:00 PM)
- Production companies: Comic International Productions Co., Ltd. 可米製作

Original release
- Network: Gala Television (GTV)
- Release: 3 June – 23 September 2006

Related
- Bump Off Lover 愛殺17; Emerald on the Roof 屋頂上的綠寶石

Tokyo Juliet (Chinese: 東方茱麗葉; pinyin: dōng fāng zhū lì yè) is a 2006 Taiwanese drama starring Ariel Lin, Wu Chun of Fahrenheit and Simon Yam. It is based on Japanese manga series Tokyo Juliet, 東京ジュリエット (Tōkyō Jurietto), written by Miyuki Kitagawa. It was produced by Comic Productions (可米製作股份有限公司) and directed by Mingtai Wang (王明台). It was broadcast on cable TV Gala Television (GTV) Variety Show/CH 28 (八大綜合台) on 3 June 2006 to 23 September 2006.

At the time the drama was filmed, Wu Chun was a relatively new actor and spoke unsatisfactory Mandarin, so producers had his voice dubbed over by Julian Yang (楊士萱).

== Synopsis ==
Lai Sui is an upcoming fashion designer who had her designs "Little Daisy", which she drew when she was 5 years old, stolen by Chu Xing (Simon Yam), a fashion 'genius'. Even though Chu Xing is a fashion genius, he still feels the need to steal designs from an up-and-coming designer. Sui believes this theft is the cause of her parents' separation, because her mother left her father for Chu Xing after he dedicated the "Little Daisy" clothing line to her since she had been one of his models. At the opening ceremony of her university, Bao Cheng Institute, she openly embarrasses and challenges Chu Xing, promising she will become a much more prominent designer than him and cause his downfall. Privately, Sui also vowed she would not fall in love until her promise is fulfilled. However, she soon changes her mind when she meets the attractive, flirty and popular senior Ji Feng Liang (Wu Chun). To her dismay, she finds out that he is both Chu Xing's one and only son and the young boy she knew at that party! There are many surprises in store for Sui as she tries to outmaneuver Chu Xing's plans to ruin her while still striving to keep a steady relationship with Liang. Then again, in the world of fashion nothing is secure...

== Cast ==
=== Main cast ===
- Ariel Lin as Lin Lai Sui (林瀨穗)
- Wu Chun (吳尊) as Ji Feng Liang (紀風亮)
- Ray Chang as Ah Si (鄭內司)
- Simon Yam as Chu Xing (褚形)
- Tang Zhi Ping (唐治平) as Ai Li Ou (艾利歐)

=== Supporting cast ===
- Alien Huang (黃鴻升) as Lu Yi Mi (陸一彌)
- Tomohisa Kagami (加賀美智久) as Ke Xing (克行)
- Lu Jia Xin (路嘉欣) as Gan Li Sha (甘理沙)
- Janel Tsai (蔡淑臻) as Gao Gang Quan (高岡泉)
- Cai Yi Zhen (蔡宜臻) as Pei Mei Zi (裴美子)
- Wu Jun Qiang (吳君強) as Guang Xi (光希)
- Alexia Gao (高伊玲) as You Qi
- Jane Wang as Sui's mother/Chu Xing's Wife

Roger Sheung as Ah Gong

== Soundtrack ==
Tokyo Juliet Original Soundtrack 東方茱麗葉 電視原聲帶

Soundtrack album by Various artists
- Released: 8 June 2006
- Genre: Mandopop
- Length: 46:24
- Language: Mandarin
- Label: HIM International Music

Tokyo Juliet Original Soundtrack (Chinese: 東方茱麗葉 電視原聲帶; pinyin: Dōng Fāng Zhūlīyè Diànshì Yuánshēngdài) was released on June 8, 2006, by various artists under HIM International Music It contains 13 tracks, in which 6 tracks are various instrumental versions of the songs. The opening theme is track 1 "Upwind 逆風" by Garden Sister, while the closing theme is track 3 "I'm No One's But Yours 非你莫屬" by Ariel Lin. The Soundtrack also comes with a bonus VCD.

=== Track listing ===
| No. | Title | Singer(s) | Length |
|---|---|---|---|
| 1. | "Upwind" (逆風) | Garden Sister | 4:17 |
| 2. | "Only Have Feelings For You" (只對你有感覺) | Fahrenheit feat Hebe | 3:58 |
| 3. | "I'm No One's But Yours" (非你莫屬) | Ariel Lin | 4:42 |
| 4. | "Tree of Love" (愛情樹) | Z-Chen | 3:56 |
| 5. | "To Own" (佔有) | Fahrenheit | 3:49 |
| 6. | "Can't Let Go" (放不下) | Kaira Gong | 4:08 |
| 7. | "Healing" (痊癒) | Z-Chen | 4:40 |
| 8. | "Upwind Night Flight" (暗夜飛行 (逆風演奏曲)) | Instrumental | 4:00 |
| 9. | "Cloud-Covered Storm Fashion Show Accompaniment" (雲裳風暴 Fashion Show 配樂) | Instrumental | 2:50 |
| 10. | "The Script of Happiness-I'm No One's But Yours" (幸福的手稿-非你莫屬演奏曲) | Instrumental | 3:20 |
| 11. | "Cheongsam Show Accompaniment" (旗袍Show 配樂) | Instrumental | 3:09 |
| 12. | "Juliet's Tears I'm No One's But Yours" (茱麗葉的眼淚 非你莫屬 演奏曲) | Instrumental | 3:16 |
| 13. | "The Stage of Love Bossanova Show Accompaniment" (愛的伸展台 Bossanova Show 配樂) | Instrumental | 3:07 |

=== Bonus VCD ===
| No. | Title | Length |
|---|---|---|
| 1. | "I'm No One's But Yours - MV" (非你莫屬 - MV) |
| 2. | "Tokyo Juliet - BTS" (東方茱麗葉精彩片花) |

== See also ==
- Tokyo Juliet (manga)
