= Huang Wen-hsing =

- 黃文星
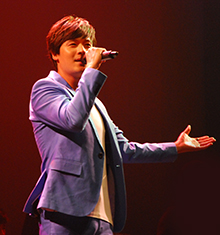
- Born: 2 June 1979 (age 47); Xinyuan, Pingtung, Taiwan
- Occupation: Singer
- Years active: 2008–present
- Awards: Golden Melody Awards – Best Taiwanese Male Singer; 2011

Chinese name
- Traditional Chinese: 黃文星
Transcriptions
Southern Min
- Hokkien POJ: N̂g Bûn-seng
- Musical career
- Origin: Taiwan
- Genre: Hokkien pop
- Instrument: vocals

Huang Wen-hsing (Chinese: 黃文星; pinyin: Huáng Wénxīng; Pe̍h-ōe-jī: N̂g Bûn-seng; born 2 June 1979) is a Taiwanese Hokkien pop singer and actor. He was named the Best Taiwanese Male Singer at the 2011 Golden Melody Awards. He has appeared in several television series, including Love or Bread (2008), Monga Yao Hui (2011), and In The Family (2017).
