= The Mysterious Family =

- Theatrical release poster
- Directed by: Park Yu-hwan
- Written by: Park Yu-hwan
- Produced by: Pan Shuling
- Starring: Ariel Lin; Jiang Wu; Kara Hui; Chen Xiao; Lan Cheng-lung
- Production company: Hengye Pictures
- Distributed by: Hengye Pictures
- Release date: 21 April 2017
- Running time: 92 minutes
- Country: China
- Language: Mandarin
- Box office: US$2.2 million (China); NT$9.9 million (Taiwan)

The Mysterious Family (Chinese: 神秘家族; also known as The Mysteries Family) is a 2017 Chinese suspense film written and directed by Park Yu-hwan. The film was inspired by a homicide case that occurred in Fujian, in 2014. The film stars Ariel Lin, Jiang Wu, Kara Hui, Chen Xiao and Lan Cheng-lung.

== Premise ==
The Mysterious Family revolves around Miao Miao, a young woman whose life and mental state changes after surviving a brutal attack by a stranger. While trying to come to terms with her trauma, she has a presentiment of a tragic event, and has to race against time in an attempt to find the truth and change the course of events.

== Cast ==
- Ariel Lin as Miao Miao
- Jiang Wu as Father
- Kara Hui as Mother
- Chen Xiao as Shu Shu
- Lan Cheng-lung as The stranger
- An Hu as Police officer
- Chang Hsiu-yun as Granny
- Jackson Lou as Police officer
- Kuo Yao-ren as Police officer
- Wang Dao-nan as Doctor
- Ma Guo-bi as Lawyer
- Mathilde Lin as Student
- Chen Wan-hao as Taxi driver

== Reception ==
The Straits Times's Boon Chan, in an article about subtitling in film, highlighted an "emotionally charged" scene in the film that caught his attention. When the mother was confronting her daughter's rapist, the English subtitles went, "You have the nuts to do it, why not have the balls to admit it?" when it should have been translated as "You had the guts to do it, why don't you have the guts to admit it?" He also remarked that "Mixing nuts and balls is clearly a case of a subtitler gone rogue."
