= A Wonderful Journey =

- A Wonderful Journey cover

Studio album 美好的旅行 by Ariel Lin
- Released: 21 August 2010
- Genre: Mandopop
- Language: Mandarin
- Label: Avex Taiwan

Ariel Lin chronology
| Blissful Encounter (2009) | A Wonderful Journey (2010) |

Alternative cover

A Wonderful Journey (Chinese: 美好的旅行; pinyin: Měihǎo de lǚxíng) is Taiwanese Mandopop artist Ariel Lin's (Chinese: 林依晨) second Mandarin studio album. It was released on 21 August 2010 by Avex Taiwan, with a limited edition, A Wonderful Journey (Limited Commemorate Edition) (美好的旅行 限量紀念精裝版) available on preorder. Then on 24 September 2010, Avex Taiwan released A Wonderful Journey (Travellog Edition) (美好的旅行 美好旅程分享盤) with a bonus DVD.

The track "花一開就相愛吧" (Fall In Love When Flower Blossoms) is listed at number 87 on Hit Fm Taiwan's Hit Fm Annual Top 100 Singles Chart (Hit-Fm年度百首單曲) for 2010.

== Track listing ==
1. "花一開就相愛吧" Hua Yi Kai Jiu Xiang Ai Ba (Fall In Love When Flower Blossoms)
2. "你有我" Ni You Wo (You Have Me)
3. "紙玫瑰" Zhi Mei Gui (Paper Rose)
4. "美好的旅行" Mei Hao De Lu Xing (A Wonderful Journey)
5. "百褶裙的夏天" Bai Zhe Qun De Xia Tian (Pleated Skirt Summer)
6. "謝謝你" Xie Xie Ni (Thank You)
7. "忽然這一秒" Hu Ran Zhe Yi Miao (Suddenly Second)
8. "誰撿到我的夢" Shei Jian Dao Wo De Meng (Who Picked Up My Dream)
9. "天使經過身邊" Tian Shi Jing Guo Shen Bian (Angels Around After)
10. "守護星" Shou Hu Xing (Guiding star)

== Releases ==
Three editions were released by Avex Taiwan:

- 21 August 2010 – A Wonderful Journey (Limited Commemorate Edition) (美好的旅行 限量紀念精裝版) – includes photobook with album artwork shoot in London, England plus postcards and gifts.
- 21 August 2010 – A Wonderful Journey (Normal Edition) (美好的旅行 超值平裝版) – includes photobook with album artwork shoot in London, England.
- 24 September 2010 – A Wonderful Journey (Travellog Edition) (美好的旅行 美好旅程分享盤) – includes a DVD:
1. A Wonderful Journey Music Love Story
2. A Wonderful Journey Music Special
3. "你有我" (You Have Me) MV
4. "你有我" (You Have Me) MV behind-the-scene
