= Tokyo Juliet (manga) =

Japanese manga series

- Cover art for the first tankōbon

東京ジュリエット (Tōkyō Jurietto)
- Genre: Romance
- Manga
- Written by: Miyuki Kitagawa
- Published by: Shogakukan
- Magazine: Shōjo Comic
- Original run: 25 March 1996 – 22 July 1999
- Volumes: 13
- Television drama
- Tokyo Juliet (2006)

Tokyo Juliet (東京ジュリエット, Tōkyō Jurietto) is a Japanese manga written and illustrated by Miyuki Kitagawa. It was serialized in Shōjo Comic.

== Manga ==
Shogakukan published the manga's 13 bound volumes between 25 March 1996 and 22 July 1999. Shogakukan re-released the manga in 6 bunkobons between 26 June 2002 and 26 November 2002.

The series is licensed in Spain by Editorial Ivrea.

== Live-action drama ==
The manga was adapted into a 17 episode Taiwanese drama titled (Chinese: 東方茱麗葉; pinyin: dōng fāng zhū lì yè) starring Ariel Lin, Wu Chun of Fahrenheit and Simon Yam. It was produced by Comic Productions (可米製作股份有限公司) and directed by Mingtai Wang (王明台). It was broadcast on cable TV Gala Television (GTV) Variety Show/CH 28 (八大綜合台) on 6 June 2006 to 23 September 2006.
