= Hypnosis Show =

- Hypnosis Show (CD) cover

Studio album 催眠Show by Show Lo
- Released: 14 October 2005
- Genre: Mandopop
- Length: 37:28
- Language: Mandarin
- Label: Avex Taiwan

Show Lo chronology
| Expert Show (2004) | Hypnosis Show (2005) | Speshow (2006) |

Alternative cover

Hypnosis Show (Chinese: 催眠Show) is Taiwanese Mandopop artist Show Lo's third Mandarin studio album. It was released on 14 October 2005 by Avex Taiwan. After receiving good reviews for the music video of the first lead track, "真命天子" (Destined Guy), featuring Jolin Tsai, the album went on pre-order sale and all of the 10,000 copies were sold in one day.

Four editions of the album were released, including Hypnosis Show (Limited Charity Edition) (催眠Show 限量慈善) (CD) which included a pass to Luo's debut solo concert 'Love's Strength' Charity Concert (《愛的力量》慈善演唱會) at Taipei Arena, Hypnosis Show (MV Encore Edition) (催眠Show 冠軍影音安可) containing four music videos; and Hypnosis Show (Commemorate Edition) (催眠Show 慶功加場版) (CD+DVD) with a bonus DVD containing 70 minutes of highlight live footage from Love's Strength Charity Concert on 18 November 2005.

== Album ==
In this album Show continues his partnership with producers Golden Melody Award winner and songwriter Di Zi (Chinese: 阿弟仔), Bi Guoyong (Chinese: 畢國勇) and Guo Jianliang (Chinese: 郭建良) plus Chen Wei (Chinese: 陳偉) of For Take One Music and Eric Ng (Chinese: 黃韻仁) of Funkie Monkies Productions, as well as choreographer Tommy (Chinese: 大目) of Dance Soul studios.

The first lead track, "真命天子" (Destined Guy), a collaboration with Jolin Tsai, is a dance track, in it she rapped and performed in the music video with Luo. The other lead track "自我催眠" (Self-Hypnosis) is composed by fellow artist Jay Chou, especially for Luo with the music video featuring his then co-host on 100% Entertainment Barbie Shu.

The music video for "嗆司嗆司" (Chance Chance), a mid-tempo dance track, was directed by Lai Wei Kang. It features Taiwanese actress Maggie Wu (吳亞馨), who later co-starred with Luo in Hi My Sweetheart; and a cameo by Luo's mother.

== Reception ==
This is the first time that an album of Luo's debuted at number one on Taiwan's G-Music Weekly Top 20 Combo and Mandarin Charts, and Five Music Chart. at week 42 (14–20 October 2005) with a percentage sales of 8.06%, 16.7%, and 18.22% respectively. It stayed on the G-Music Mandarin Chart continuously for 14 weeks, selling over 100,000 copies, the Combo Chart and Five Music Chart for 12 weeks.

The tracks, "真命天子" (Destined Guy) and "自我催眠" (Self-Hypnosis) are listed at number 55 and 70 respectively on Hit Fm Taiwan's Hit Fm Annual Top 100 Singles Chart (Hit-Fm年度百首單曲) for 2005.

The tracks, "自我催眠" (Self-Hypnosis) was nominated and "真命天子" (Destined Guy) won one of the Songs of the Year at the 2006 Metro Radio Mandarin Music Awards presented by Hong Kong radio station Metro Info. Both tracks were also nominated for Top 10 Gold Songs at the Hong Kong TVB8 Awards, presented by television station TVB8, in 2006.

== Track listing ==
| # | Original Title | Pinyin | English | Remarks | Producer | Length |
|---|---|---|---|---|---|---|
| 1. | "真命天子" | Zhen Ming Tian Zi | Destined Guy | feat Jolin Tsai | Bi Guoyong | 3:17 |
| 2. | "淘汰郎" | Tao Tai Lang | Eliminated Man | | Bi Guoyong | 4:02 |
| 3. | "自我催眠" | Zi Wo Cui Mian | Self-Hypnosis | composed by Jay Chou | Di Zi | 4:24 |
| 4. | "嗆司嗆司" | Qiang Si Qiang Si | Chance Chance | | Di Zi | 3:48 |
| 5. | "猛男日記" | Meng Nan Ri Ji | Diary of a Muscle Man | | Di Zi | 3:24 |
| 6. | "黑眼圈" | Hei Yan Quan | Dark Eye Circles | | Guo Jianliang | 3:46 |
| 7. | "不懂我的心" | Bu Dong Wo De Xin | Don't Understand My Heart | | | 3:36 |
| 8. | "力量" | Li Liang | Strength | | Eric Ng | 3:52 |
| 9. | "駭客入侵" | Hai Ke Ru Qin | Hacker Invasion | | Chen Wei | 3:55 |
| 10. | "火警119" | Huo Jing 119 | Emergency 119 | | Di Zi | 3:25 |

== Music videos ==
- "自我催眠" (Self-Hypnosis) MV - feat Barbie Shu - directed by Tony Lin
- "真命天子" (Destined Guy) MV - feat Jolin Tsai - directed by Marlboro Lai
- "嗆司嗆司" (Chance Chance) MV - feat Maggie Wu (吳亞馨) and cameo by Luo MaMa (show's mother) - directed byMarlboro Lai
- "力量" (Strength) MV - directed by Tony Lin

Karaoke version with concert footage + some original footage

- "淘汰郎" (Eliminated Man) MV
- "不懂我的心" (Don't Understand My Heart) MV
- "黑眼圈" (Dark Eye Circles) MV
- "猛男日記" (Diary of a Muscle Man) MV

== Releases ==
Four editions (excludes pre-order editions) were released by Avex Taiwan:

- 4 October 2005 - Hypnosis Show (Preorder Edition) (催眠Show) (CD) - includes a playing card set with logo designed by Show and autograph.
- 14 October 2005 - Hypnosis Show (催眠Show) (CD)
- 4 November 2005 - Hypnosis Show (Limited Charity Edition) (催眠Show 限量慈善) (CD) - includes a pass to Show's 'Love's Strength' Charity Concert (《愛的力量》慈善演唱會) at Taipei Arena.
- 25 November 2005 - Hypnosis Show (MV Encore Edition) (催眠Show 冠軍影音安可) (CD+DVD) - includes 3 MV's
1. 真命天子 (Destined Guy) feat Jolin Tsai
2. 自我催眠 (Self-Hypnosis) feat Da S
3. 嗆司嗆司 (Chance Chance) cameo by Luo MaMa
- 20 January 2006 - Hypnosis Show (Commemorate Edition) (催眠Show 慶功加場版) (CD+DVD) - includes a 70 minutes version of Show's 'Love's Strength' Charity Concert (《愛的力量》慈善演唱會) at Taipei Arena with special guest performance of "真命天子" (Destined Guy) with Jolin Tsai and behind the scenes footage. For details of track listing - see Show Lo discography.

== Charts ==
| Chart Name | Debut Position | Week# / Week Dates of Peak Position | Peak Position | Percentage of Album Sales at Peak | Chart Run |
|---|---|---|---|---|---|
| Five Music Taiwan; 5大金榜 | #1 | #42 / 14–20 October 2005 | #1 | 18.22% | 12 weeks |
| G-Music Combo Chart, Taiwan 風雲榜 (綜合榜) | #1 | #41 / 14–20 October 2005 | #1 | 8.06% | 12 weeks |
| G-Music Mandarin Chart, Taiwan 風雲榜 (華語榜) | #1 | #41 / 14–20 October 2005 | #1 | 16.7% | 14 weeks |

Hit Fm Annual Top 100 Singles Chart - 2005
| Track name | Position |
|---|---|
| "真命天子" (Destined Guy) | #55 |
| "自我催眠" (Self-Hypnosis) | #70 |
