= In the Family (TV series) =

- Promotional poster
- Chinese: 一家人
- Hokkien POJ: Chi̍t-ke-lâng
- Genre: Taiwanese drama
- Written by: Chu, Zhang Yiting, Wang Lingling, Qiao Ling, Xia Guan
- Directed by: Feng Kai
- Starring: Pei Hsiao-Lan; Chen Ting
- Country of origin: Taiwan
- Original languages: Hokkien; Mandarin
- No. of episodes: 720

Production
- Executive producer: Liu Shi-fan
- Producers: Lin Yating, Wu Shengwen, Liu Yifeng, Huang Weicheng, Chen Ziying, Zi Yinwei, Li Jiafen
- Running time: 110 minutes (Episode 1); 150 minutes (Monday-Thursday), with commercial breaks 135 minutes (Fridays), with commercial breaks

Original release
- Network: SET Taiwan, SET Drama
- Release: June 14, 2017 – January 23, 2018

Related
- Taste of Life; 100% Wife

In The Family (Chinese: 一家人; Pe̍h-ōe-jī: Chi̍t-ke-lâng; lit. 'One Family') is a 2017 Taiwanese drama. It premiered on June 14, 2017, after the finale of Taste of Life, and continued its broadcast every weekday at 8pm on SET Taiwan. The finale of the drama was aired on January 9, 2018, with 150 episodes aired in total. The final episode was watched by 1.5 million viewers.

== Cast ==
=== Ye Family (Four Season Beef Noodle Soup) ===
- Pei Xiaolan as Huang Lijuan
- Chen Ting as Ye Guolun
- Zhang Yuyan as Liu Yunzhen
- Han Yu as Ye Xiaochun
- Chen Peiqi as Ye Xiaoxia
- Athena Lee Yen as Ye Xiaoqiu
- Zang Ruixuan as Ye Xiaodong

=== Lin Family ===
- Yang Lie as Lin Tsung-yuan
- Ke Suyun as Cui Yinchai
- Chen Yufeng as Lin Weili
- Li Liangjin as Yu Le-rong
- Wu Cai-ting as Lin Zhiyun
- Ding Liqi as Xu Chaoren
- Zhao Junya as Lin Weilian
- Wang Qing as Lin Fenfen

=== Xu Family ===
- Jian Chang as Xu Mingzong
- Li Fangwen as Song Rui-ci
- Chen Zhijiang as Xu Hanmin

=== Hong Family (Dong-an Create) ===
- Liang Jia-rong as Hong Zhiyong's sister
- Norman Chen as Hong Zhiyong
- Mai Haiqi as Hong Zuwang

=== Zhang Family ===
- Lin Andi as Zhang Zhengkai's father
- Lin Peijun as Zhang Zhengkai's mother
- Huang Wen-hsing as Zhang Zhengkai

=== Other casts ===
- Liang Zhe as Li Shaofeng
- Zheng Yi as Wang Youliang
- Zhang Weixi as Wudi
- Chen Xiaojing as Ai-wei
- Luo Qiao Lun as Liao Sha-sha
- Liao Lijun as Li Huizhi
- Qian Duoan as Qian Yajun
- Pan Weizhi as ???
- Zhang Jiaxuan as He Jiali
- Ma Youxing as Vegetable Market Vendor
- Zhu Ziti as Lin Yawen
- Chen Yizhen as ???

=== Guest casts ===
- Peng Chia-chia as Miao Gong
- Tu Kai-hsiang as Jin Jing-li
- Bai Yun as Liu Jing-li
- Chiu Ping-tian as Ye Xiaochun
- Chiu Chen-en as Zhang Zhengkai
- Chang Huan-yu as Mr. Jiali

Before: Taste of Life; July 28, 2015 - June 16, 2017	Taiwan SET Taiwan Monday through Thursday 8PM-10:30PM; Friday 8PM-10:15PM; In The Family; June 16, 2017 - January 8, 2018	Next: 100% Wife; January 9, 2018

Before: Taste of Life; August 4, 2015 - June 23, 2017	Taiwan SET Drama Monday through Friday 8PM-10:30PM; In The Family; June 16, 2017 - January, 2018	Next: 100% Wife; January, 2018
