= Show Your Dance =

- Show Your Dance cover

Studio album 舞所不在 by Show Lo
- Released: 16 November 2007
- Genre: Mandopop
- Length: 40:37
- Language: Mandarin
- Label: EMI Music Taiwan

Show Lo chronology
Best Show (2007)	Show Your Dance (2007)	Show On Cruel Stage (2008)

Alternative cover

Show Your Dance (Chinese: 舞所不在) is Taiwanese Mandopop artist Show Lo's fifth Mandarin studio album. It was released on 16 November 2007 by EMI Music Taiwan. This is Show's first album since moving from Avex Taiwan to EMI Music Taiwan.

The album was available on pre-order and three versions were released including the Show Your Dance (Champion Edition) (舞所不在 舞霸冠軍盤) containing four music videos and Show Your Dance (Collectible Edition) (舞所不在 衛冕慶功黃金典藏版) with a bonus DVD of footages from 2007 Show Lo Cotton USA 《When We Are 2gether》 Tainan Celebration Concert (羅志祥美國棉《當我們宅一塊》台南慶功演唱會).

== Album ==
The album contains 11 tracks, with high-tempo dance track "一支獨秀" (One Man Show) being the first lead track. The other lead track "敗給你" (Lost To You) is a mid-tempo duet with Elva Hsiao. Show composed up-tempo track "操盤手" (DJ) and Karena Lam co-starred with Luo in the music video for "我不會唱歌" (I Don't Know How To Sing), where her parts were filmed on location in Paris, France.

== Reception ==
The album debuted at number one on Taiwan's G-Music Weekly Top 20 Mandarin and Combo Charts; and Five Music Chart at week 46 (16–22 November 2007) with a percentage sales of 25.97%, 12.24%, and 26.68% respectively. It charted continuously in the Mandarin Chart for 18 weeks, the Combo Chart for 15 weeks and the 5 Music Chart for 16 weeks.

The tracks "我不會唱歌" (I Don't Know How To Sing), "敗給你" (Lost To You) and "一支獨秀" (One Man Show) are listed at number 23, 74 and 87 respectively on Hit Fm Taiwan's Hit Fm Annual Top 100 Singles Chart (Hit-Fm年度百首單曲) for 2007.

The track, "一支獨秀" (One Man Show) won one of the three Mandarin Song Grand Prize at the 2007 Metro Radio Hit Awards and one of the Songs of the Year at the 2008 Metro Radio Mandarin Music Awards, both presented by Hong Kong radio station Metro Info. It also won one of the Top 10 Songs of the Year and "我不會唱歌" (I Don't Know How To Sing) won iSing99 Karaoke Song Award at the 2008 HITO Radio Music Awards presented by Taiwanese radio station Hit FM.

The album was awarded one of the Top 10 Selling Mandarin Albums of the Year at the 2008 IFPI Hong Kong Album Sales Awards, presented by the Hong Kong branch of IFPI.

== Track listing ==
No.	Title	Lyrics	Music	Translation	Length
1.	"一支獨秀" (Yī Zhī Dú Xiù)	Chen Zhenchuan (陳鎮川)	Xiao An (小安)	One Man Show	3:08
2.	"當我們宅一塊" (Dāng Wǒ Men Zhái Yī Kuài)	Chen Tianyou (陳天佑)	Lemon Tree (aka U GI JAE HO 2)	When We Are Together	4:01
3.	"我不會唱歌" (Wǒ Bù Huì Chàng Gē)	Ma Songwei (馬嵩惟)	Ah Qin (阿沁)	I Don't Know How To Sing	4:30
4.	"敗給你 feat.蕭亞軒" (Bài Gěi Nǐ feat. Elva Hsiao)	Xu Shizhen (徐世珍), Chen Tianyou (陳天佑)	Mikkel Remee Sigvardt	Lost To You (Ft. Elva Hsiao)	4:00
5.	"愛情三『不』曲" (Ài Qíng Sān "bù" Qǔ)	Li Zong En (李宗恩)	Niklas Pettersson, Vincent Degiorgio	Love No-Go's	3:24
6.	"做得到" (Zuò Dé Dào)	Liao Ying Ru (廖瑩如)	Paul Lee (李偉菘)	Do It Well	3:56
7.	"蝴蝶秀" (Hú Dié Xiù)	Li Zong En (李宗恩)	阿弟仔	Lipodustrophy	3:07
8.	"操盤手" (Cāo Pán Shǒu)	Yi Jia Yang (易家揚), Wonderful	Show Lo (羅志祥)	DJ	2:47
9.	"防盜鎖" (Fáng Dào Suǒ)	Ge Dawei (葛大為), Chen Tianyou (陳天佑)	Lin Qi Yu (林倛玉)	The Lock On Your Heart	4:27
10.	"最後的風度" (Zuì Hòu De Fēng Dù)	Lin Xi (林夕)	Xu Wei Xian (徐偉賢)	Gentleman-Like Manner	4:04
11.	"我秀故我在" (Wǒ Xiù Gù Wǒ Zài)	Luke"skywalker"Tsui (崔惟楷)	Waermo, Mimmi／Englof, Marcus／Waermo, Samuel	I Dance, Therefore I Am	3:14

== Music videos ==
Song title	Translation	Length	Notes
最後的風度	Gentleman-Like Manner	4:11	
我不會唱歌	I Don't Know How To Sing	6:39	Feat. Karena Lam
一支獨秀	One Man Show	4:31	
當我們宅一塊	When We Are Together	4:04	
敗給你	Lost To You	3:59	Feat. Elva Hsiao

== Releases ==
Three editions (excludes pre-order editions) were released by EMI Music Taiwan:

- 16 November 2007 - Show Your Dance «Preorder Edition» (CD) - includes gifts
- 16 November 2007 - Show Your Dance (CD)
- 21 December 2007 - Show Your Dance (Champion Edition) (CD+DVD) (舞所不在 舞霸冠軍盤) (CD+DVD) - includes 4 MV's
1. "一支獨秀" (One Man Show) MV
2. "敗給你" (Lost To You) - feat Elva Hsiao MV
3. "我不會唱歌" (I Don't Know How To Sing) - feat Karena Lam MV
4. "當我們宅一塊" (When We Are Together) MV
- 25 January 2008 - Show Your Dance (Collectible Edition) (舞所不在 衛冕慶功黃金典藏版) (CD+DVD) - includes "最後的風度" (Gentleman-Like Manner) music video and 2007 Show Lo Cotton USA 《When We Are 2gether》 Tainan Celebration Concert (羅志祥美國棉《當我們宅一塊》台南慶功演唱會) live DVD

== Charts ==
Hit Fm Annual Top 100 Singles Chart - 2007
Track name	Position
"我不會唱歌" (I Don't Know How To Sing)	#23
"敗給你" (Lost To You)	#74
"一支獨秀" (One Man Show)	#87
