= Love or Bread =

- Promotion poster
- Also known as: 我的億萬麵包 我的爱情面包
- Genre: Romance; Comedy
- Directed by: Lin He Long
- Starring: Joe Cheng; Ariel Lin
- Opening theme: "億萬克拉的幸福" (Million Dollar Happiness) by Huang Wen-hsing
- Ending theme: "麵包的滋味" (The Taste of Bread) by Ariel Lin
- Country of origin: Taiwan
- Original language: Mandarin
- No. of episodes: 12

Production
- Production location: Taipei, Taiwan
- Running time: 90 mins (Sundays at 22:00)
- Production company: Gala Television

Original release
- Network: China Television (CTV)
- Release: 16 November 2008 – 8 February 2009

Related
- Hot Shot; ToGetHer

Love or Bread (Chinese: 我的億萬麵包; pinyin: Wǒ de yì wàn miànbāo; lit. 'My billion dollar bread') is a 2008 Taiwanese drama starring Joe Cheng and Ariel Lin. It was produced by Gala Television and directed by Lin He-long. This marks the third drama that Cheng and Lin have co-starred together, after It Started with a Kiss in 2005 and its sequel They Kiss Again in 2007.

It was first broadcast in Taiwan on free-to-air China Television (CTV) from 16 November 2008 to 8 February 2009, every Sunday at 22:00 and cable TV GTV Variety Show/CH 28 on 22 November 2008 to 14 February 2009, every Saturday at 21:30.

This drama is broadcast on Hunan TV in China from February 11, 2009, every day at 22:00 (full version of this drama with 25 episodes). When broadcast in China, the drama is titled 我的爱情面包 (Wǒ de àiqíng miànbāo, My love bread) instead of 我的億萬麵包 (Wǒ de yì wàn miànbāo, My billion dollar bread) as when broadcast in Taiwan (the drama's English name is still Love or Bread). Many of Ariel Lin's scenes in China in this drama were cut out when broadcast in Taiwan, but were broadcast in full in China.

== Synopsis ==
Frank (Joe Cheng) is a young man who wears designer labels and thinks he's suave when he is actually poor. He had a tragic past and both his parents died, he doesn't know how to handle money. His grandmother misunderstood that he had to steal to make money, so she chased him out of the countryside. Frank then went to Taipei to find a job and became a cleaning staff for a cleaning company with A Xing (Huang Wen-hsing). The money he earns every month goes to his grandmother. He borrowed money from the bank and loan sharks but ended up with a gang coming after him. He considers pawning his mother's gold ring, the only thing he had left of hers, but he can't do it.

Zeng Shanmei (Ariel Lin) is a poor but very loving, caring, and hard-working girl. She has a boyfriend (Jing Rong), but he moves to mainland China for university and promises that they will get married after he graduates. At that time, Shanmei worked as a bank employee during office hours and as a janitor at a shopping mall at night to earn money to send to her boyfriend Jing Rong in Hangzhou. Shanmei goes after him to China hoping they will finally get married. Shanmei's family is against her decision because they need her to support them, but her father holds off the rest of the family while yelling at Shanmei that she should go and be happy. Shanmei once saved Frank's life when Frank was drowned in a barrel of water in Frank's motel room by gangsters. She met Frank again while he was running from the gangsters who loaned him the money—in the ladies' bathroom. Thinking that he's a pervert, she reports him to the police and he gets arrested. The gold ring fell out of Frank's pocket in the girls' bathroom and the policeman stuck it into Shanmei's bag. He meets Shanmei once more, this time on the road. He tries to get his ring back from her but she has no idea what he's talking about and she still thinks that he's a pervert. He doesn't get his ring, but he does get to drive her to the airport.

When Shanmei reaches her destination in Hangzhou, she helps her boyfriend Jing Rong's two roommates put out the fire that was burning in the shared kitchen of the motel room. The two then treat her to food and tell her about Jing Rong (Wu Jianfei) and Xiao Bo. They said that the four of them lived in this motel room together. At that time, Shanmei thought that Xiao Bo was a boy like Jing Rong and these two roommates. She met her boyfriend Jing Rong at night and casually mentions "Xiao Bo". Shanmei then always cooked for Jing Rong and his two roommates and was taken around Hangzhou by Jing Rong. Shanmei found it strange that Xiao Bo didn't appear. Eventually, Jing Rong couldn't take the guilt and admitted to Shanmei that he betrayed her and fell for Xiao Bo, who is actually a girl. Seeing that Xiao Bo (Zhang Na) is seriously ill in need of surgery, Shanmei helped Jing Rong take care of Xiao Bo for a few days. Jing Rong returned the money Shanmei had sent to Jing Rong for the past 3 years, but Shanmei refused. Shanmei asked Jing Rong to keep the money to help Xiao Bo with surgery.

After that, Shanmei didn't have the money to fly back to Taiwan, so she decided to get a job in Hangzhou. She was recommended by two of Jing Rong's roommates to work as a maid in Jin Enhao's house in Hangzhou. Jin Enhao (Ray Chang) once asked the previous maids to finish their work and leave his house before he got home from work, otherwise they would be fired by him. Many previous maids had been fired like this, so Shanmei always tried to finish the housework quickly and avoid Jin Enhao. Jin Enhao enjoyed eating Taiwanese food cooked by Shanmei and wanted to meet Shanmei, but he couldn't meet Shanmei. Jin Enhao's foster father (Yue Yaoli) met Shanmei. He liked Shanmei and wanted Shanmei to marry Jin Enhao. But Shanmei misunderstood that Jin Enhao's foster father had bad intentions toward her, so after she received a salary as a maid, she bought a plane ticket to fly from Hangzhou to Taiwan.

After 1 month in Hangzhou, Shanmei returns to Taiwan with nowhere to go. She cannot go home because her mother said when she was leaving to China that if she went then she wouldn't be considered a member of the family anymore. Her best friend, Huang Linglong (Zhang Yuchen) was constantly nagging at her not to go and even said "don't come crying to me." Shanmei decides to rent a place by using Frank's gold ring that the policeman had found. Her neighbouring tenant just happens to be no-one other than Frank. Frank and Shanmei later discovered that the owner of the house they rented from was a fraud who took Frank's gold ring away. The real the owner of the house was in America.

When they both want money and they are complete opposites. Introduced by Lin Meiru, Frank went to work as an aircraft engineer but he wore a pilot's outfit on the first day and was ridiculed. He immediately quit his job. Shanmei was introduced by Lin Meiru to work as a manager of a clothing section in a shopping mall. While working, she discovered that her friend Huang Linglong also worked in the same clothing department as her, and she also quit her job. Frank and Shanmei were then introduced by Lin Meiru to learn how to make bread. Because Shamei was allergic to flour, he stopped working, and Frank also stopped working along with Shanmei. Then Frank and Shanmei registered to learn English to export labor abroad. However, both of them only worried about causing trouble with each other, did not focus on studying and in the end both of them dropped out of school. Then Frank worked as a car salesman. Time came that Shanmei thinks of ending her life because there is no hope of retrieving her boyfriend. However, thanks to the advice of Frank and the fortune teller, Shanmei gave up the idea of killing herself because of her failure in love with Jing Rong. Later, Shanmei worked part-time jobs such as wearing a mascot and handing out leaflets to shopping malls, selling magnolia at traffic lights, helping at a coffee shop, and selling beer at a roadside restaurant. Frank also worked part-time at the same cafe as Shanmei.

That's when Shanmei and Frank meet numerous times. But both of them are having money issues so they decide to continue living together in the house they were renting. Frank pretends to be Shanmei's rich husband to help Shanmei get forgiveness from her family about her leaving home to Hangzhou to find Jing Rong in the past. Little do they know that they both started falling in love with one another. However, they dared not say love to each other.

Jin Enhao in Hangzhou always remembers the dishes that Shanmei cooks, so he sent someone to investigate Shanmei. Jin Enhao's men went to Jing Rong's room to look for her, but couldn't find Shanmei. Jin Enhao then flew from Hangzhou to Taiwan to find Shanmei. Jin Enhao then stepped between Shanmei and Frank. Frank's childhood lover Ye Kena (owner of the coffee shop where Shanmei and Frank are working part-time, played by Lu Xiaolin) also appeared and influenced the relationship between Frank and Shanmei. Jin Enhao's foster father was ill, so Jin Enhao managed the shopping mall that Shanmei is working for part-time instead of him.

After being fired from his job selling cars, Frank turned to working as a magician at bars with his childhood friend Da Tou to earn money. Frank was conscious that he could not bring a good and happy life to Shanmei, so he had the intention of giving up and leaving Shanmei to Jin Enhao.

After that, Frank not only ignored Shanmei's use of his ring to rent a house, he also borrowed money from the gangsters to help Shanmei's mother with heart surgery. Frank was arrested by the gangsters because he did not have the money to pay his debt. Shanmei goes to save Frank and is also captured. Both are about to be killed by the gangsters when Huang Linglong and A Xing fail to deliver the money on time. Thanks to Chen Wancai (a retired gangster with a dead wife whose face resembles Shanmei, played by Zhao Shun), Frank and Shanmei are saved.

Shanmei then goes to Frank's hometown to help Frank and his grandmother reconcile. The two decided to leave the house they used to rent for more than 3 months. Frank then blessed Shanmei and Jin Enhao, and Shanmei blessed Frank and Ye Kena. The two bid each other farewell.

Since Ye Kena has switched to teaching dance to children, her coffee shop has closed. Shanmei had to return to being a bank employee like before. And Frank switched to working as a construction worker.

Several months passed, Shanmei met Ye Kena. Ye Kena said that she hasn't seen Frank for a long time and that Frank had feelings for Shanmei. Frank is then informed by the police that the fake owner of the house from the past has been arrested. His mother's gold ring was given to him by the police. Frank returned to the house he once rented with Shanmei and learned that the real owner of the house had returned from America. Frank spent money to rent that house to live with memories of Shanmei.

Six months later, Shanmei was marrying Jin Enhao when she ran out of the aisle looking for Frank. Wearing a bridal gown, Shanmei runs to the rented house she used to live with Frank and meets Frank again. The two looked at each other and called each other's names in happy tears.

== Cast ==
- Joe Cheng as Frank / Cai Jinlai
- Ariel Lin as Zeng Shanmei
- Ray Chang as Jin Enhao
- Zhang Yuchen as Huang Linglong
- Huang Wen-hsing as himself
- Lu Xiaolin as Ye Kena
- Wu Jianfei as Jing Rong
- Zhang Na as Xiao Bo
- Kuo Tzu-chien as Zeng Huo-shu
- Lin Mei-hsiu as Zeng Huang Shuiliang
- Wang Yuetang as Zeng Xiaobei
- Yue Yaoli as Enhao's foster father
- Zhao Shun as Wan Ye (Chen Wancai)

== Production ==
In July 2008, GTV announced that lead actress Barbie Shu will be replaced by Ariel Lin. GTV stated that the drama, which was scheduled to start shooting in August, had originally cast Lin for the role of Zeng Shanmei, hence it has now returned to the actress for whom it was originally intended.

== Music ==
- Opening theme song: "億萬克拉的幸福" (Million Dollar Happiness) by Huang Wen-hsing
- Ending theme song: "麵包的滋味" (The Taste of Bread) by Ariel Lin

Insert songs

- "If I Could" by Babyface
- "歐兜水" by Huang Wen-hsing

== International broadcast ==
- Hong Kong - TVB, from February 7, 2009, every day 22:00 (full version of this drama with 25 episodes).
- China - Hunan TV, from February 11, 2009, every day 22:00 (full version of this drama with 25 episodes).
- Philippines – ABS-CBN, from June 15, 2009, every Monday to Friday 17:15.
- Japan – Television Kanagawa, Metele, Shizuoka Asahi Television, BS Japan
- Thailand – Channel 7, from August 27, 2013, every Monday to Thursday 03:50.
