= Eternal Summer (2006 film) =

- Promotional poster for Eternal Summer
- Traditional Chinese: 盛夏光年
- Hanyu Pinyin: Shèngxià Guāng Nián
- Directed by: Leste Chen
- Written by: Hsu Cheng-ping
- Produced by: Leste Chen; Patrick Mao Huang
- Starring: Joseph Chang; Ray Chang; Kate Yeung
- Cinematography: Charlie Lam
- Edited by: Ku Hsiao-Yun
- Music by: Zane Yang; Howie Chou; Jeffrey Cheng
- Distributed by: Flash Forward Entertainment; Rolling Film Entertainment
- Release date: 13 October 2006
- Running time: 95 minutes
- Country: Taiwan
- Language: Mandarin
- Box office: $255,440

Eternal Summer (Chinese: 盛夏光年; pinyin: Shèngxià Guāng Nián) is a 2006 Taiwanese romantic drama film starring Joseph Chang, Ray Chang and Kate Yeung. It was directed by Leste Chen. The film tells the story of three high school students who experience the agonies and ecstasies of love.

The film received four nominations at the 43rd Golden Horse Awards, where Ray Chang won the award for Best New Performer.

== Plot ==
As a child living in a seaside town in southern Taiwan, studious Jonathan (Ray Chang) was asked by his concerned teacher to look after rebellious classmate Shane (Joseph Chang). Ten years later, what was once a good-natured obligation has since blossomed into a warm friendship, with Jonathan still on the academic track and Shane now finding his calling on the basketball court.

Taiwan-born schoolgirl Carrie (Kate Yeung) arrives from Hong Kong to join her mother after a disagreement with her father and transfers to their school. She befriends Jonathan and convinces him to join her on a secret day-trip to Taipei. In the evening, she seduces him in a sleazy hotel but Jonathan backs down, clearly distraught. Eventually, her observations of his and Shane's friendship leads her to believe that he is gay and in love with his best friend.

Carrie then meets Shane through Jonathan after a school day where Shane develops an interest in Carrie. Despite her initial misgivings about the boorish Shane, she eventually gives in to the troublemaker's roguish charms. She accepts his offer to become his girlfriend on the condition that he manages to enter university.

Later, Shane pulls his act together and gets into university while Jonathan, distracted by his burgeoning sexual identity crisis, does not. Shane does his best to keep his feelings for Carrie secret in order to protect the feelings of his lifelong friend. Despite their best efforts, the truth eventually emerges, forcing all three to view their relationships in an entirely new light.

Following a party, Shane is hit by a car while riding his motorbike. Jonathan comes in to bring him back home. There, Shane suddenly initiates and they have sex to which Jonathan reluctantly gives in to him. Early next morning while Shane is still asleep, Jonathan calls Carrie to always look after Shane and then leaves.

Shortly after, Shane takes Jonathan and Carrie to the beach. Jonathan tells Shane they should stop seeing each other. Furious, Shane tackles Jonathan to the ground and asks if he really means it. Carrie leaves the two boys alone and watches from the car. Shane repeats again that best friends can tell each other anything. Jonathan says that he and Shane may no longer want to be friends anymore but finally confesses his romantic feelings for him and walks away. Shane then shouts that he has a secret as well and reveals that he has been diagnosed with Attention deficit hyperactivity disorder which led to loneliness in childhood and how he always knew the teacher forced Jonathan to be his friend. Jonathan's feelings are seemingly left unrequited in the end as Shane answers to his confession that he sees him as his best friend.

== Cast ==
- Joseph Chang as Shane (余守恒)
- Ray Chang as Jonathan (康正行)
- Kate Yeung as Carrie (慧嘉)

== Release ==
The film had special screening in the Taiwan Uncut section of the 25th New York Asian Film Festival on 15 July 2026 as part of the 25th anniversary of the festival.

== Awards and nominations ==
Eternal Summer won one awards out of four nominations at the 43rd Golden Horse Awards in 2006.

Year	Category	Nomination	Result	Ref
2006	Best Supporting Actor	Joseph Chang	Nominated	
2006	Best New Performer	Ray Chang	Won	
2006	Best New Performer	Joseph Chang	Nominated	
2006	Best Original Song	"盛夏光年" (Eternal Summer) by Mayday released Eternal Summer	Nominated	
