= Destined Guy =

Single by Show Lo and Jolin Tsai

from the album Hypnosis Show
- Language: Mandarin
- Released: September 28, 2005
- Genre: Pop
- Length: 3:17
- Label: Avex
- Composers: Ralph Chartwell; Jud Mahoney; Michael Nielsen; Allen Savory
- Lyricist: Issac Chen
- Producer: Daniel Bi

Show Lo singles chronology
"Robotic Doll" (2004)	"Destined Guy" (2005)	"Dance Gate" (2006)

Jolin Tsai singles chronology
"J-Game" (2005)	"Destined Guy" (2005)	"My Choice" (2006)

Music video
- "Destined Guy" on YouTube

"Destined Guy" (Chinese: 真命天子; pinyin: Zhēnmìng tiānzǐ) is a song by Taiwanese singers Show Lo and Jolin Tsai, featured on Lo's third studio album Hypnosis Show (2005). Written by Ralph Chartwell, Jud Mahoney, Michael Nielsen, Allen Savory, and Issac Chen, and produced by Daniel Bi, the track was released as a single by Avex on September 28, 2005.

== Composition ==
"Destined Guy" is characterized by its upbeat rhythm and infectious melody, blending urban pop and R&B influences. The song's lyrics explore the courage to pursue love in a modern city setting, capturing the emotional dynamics between attraction and self-expression. Lo invited Tsai to collaborate on the track as part of an effort to explore new musical styles. He later revealed that their friendship began during a challenging period in their careers, when both artists were facing contractual difficulties. The two had once promised to support each other when they achieved success as the "king and queen" of pop music.

== Music video ==
The music video for "Destined Guy", directed by Marlboro Lai, featured both Lo and Tsai. With a production budget of approximately NT$2 million, the video was notable for being the first in Taiwan to incorporate LED display panels as indoor background visual effects.

== Commercial performance ==
"Destined Guy" ranked at number 55 on Taiwan's Hit FM Top 100 Singles of 2005.

== Awards ==
On August 6, 2006, "Destined Guy" won the Top Mandarin Songs Award at the 2006 Metro Radio Mandarin Hits Music Awards.

== Credits and personnel ==
- Daniel Bi – rap arrangement, backing vocals
- Show Lo – backing vocals
- Jud Mahoney – backing vocals
- Allen Savory – backing vocals
- AJ Chen – recording engineering
- Keller Wang – mixing engineering

== Release history ==
Release dates and formats for "Destined Guy"
Region	Date	Format(s)	Distributor
Taiwan	September 28, 2005	Radio airplay	Avex
