= Miyuki Kitagawa =

Japanese manga artist

Miyuki Kitagawa (北川みゆき, Kitagawa Miyuki) is a Japanese manga artist. She was born on January 1, 1967, in Tokyo, Japan.

She is married to Satoru Akahori, who is a novelist.

== Works ==
- Ami! Non Stop (Manga)
- Ano Ko ni 1000% (Manga/OAV)
- Chokotto H na Koimonogatari (Manga - Authored one story)
- Dare Nimo (Manga - Hoshi sae mo Nemuru Yoru)
- Fukigen na Aibu (Manga)
- Kimagure Engage (Manga)
- Kimagure Graffiti (Manga)
- Kimagure Growing Up (Manga)
- Kimagure Wedding (Manga)
- Nude na Kajitsu tachi (Manga)
- Oya Niwa Naisho no Koimonogatari (Manga - Shinayaka ni Kizutsuite or Hurt Me Gracefully)
- Princess Army (Manga/OAV)
- She's Kids (Manga)
- Shinayaka ni Kizutsuite (Manga)
- Tokyo Juliet (manga) (Manga)
- Tsuki ni Kiss no Hanataba O (Manga)
- Tsumi ni Nureta Futari (Manga)
- Sono Otoko Unmei ni Tsuki/That man is my destiny (Manga)
- Seuseu Suruhodo, Aishiteru (Manga)
