= Ray Chang (actor) =

Taiwanese actor

- 張睿家
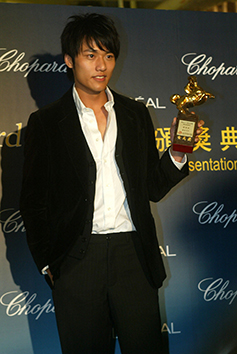
- Chang in 2006
- Born: Chang Chia-chen (張家振); March 31, 1985 (age 41); Taiwan
- Education: Taipei Municipal Nangang Vocational High School; Taipei Physical Education College
- Occupation: Actor
- Years active: 2003—present
- Awards: Golden Horse Awards – Best New Performer; 2006: Eternal Summer

Chinese name
- Traditional Chinese: 張睿家
- Simplified Chinese: 张睿家
Transcriptions
Standard Mandarin
- Hanyu Pinyin: Zhāng Ruìjiā
Yue: Cantonese
- Jyutping: Zoeng1 Jeoi6 Gaa1
Southern Min
- Hokkien POJ: Tiuⁿ Jōe-ka
- Musical career
- Also known as: Bryant Chang; Chang Ruei-jia; Chang Jui-chia; Zhang Rui-jia

Ray Chang (born March 31, 1985), formerly known as Bryant Chang, is a Taiwanese actor. He is known for his role in Eternal Summer, for which he won the Best New Performer award at the 2006 Golden Horse Awards.

== Filmography ==
=== Film ===
Year	English title	Original title	Role	Notes/Ref.
2002	Double Vision	雙瞳	Plainclothes police officer	Bit part
2006	Eternal Summer	盛夏光年	Jonathan	
2007	Summer's Tail	夏天的尾巴	Jimmy Chan	
2009	Invitation Only	絕命派對	Wade Chen	
2009	Yang Yang	陽陽	Shawn	
2009	Summer Times	夏天協奏曲	Lin Ming-Kuan	
2009	Rail Truck	トロッコ / 軌道	Chen-che	
2011	Justice of the Night	那一夜的正義		Short film; alternative title: My Buddies
2011	Make Up	命運化妝師	Kuo Yung-ming	
2013	Love in Changhua	愛。在彰化		Short film
2014	Meet Macao	遇見美好的你		Short film
2014	Anywhere Somewhere Nowhere	到不了的地方	Hsieh	
2014	Dream Flight	想飛	Chang Chia-hao	
2015	Lion Dancing 2	鐵獅玉玲瓏2	Tung-po	
2015	When Geek Meets Serial Killer	宅男女神殺人狂	Chien-ho	
2015	Tomb Mystery	墓穴迷城	Hsieh Chun-an	
2015	In the Land of the Blind	盲人村	Hsiao-yang	Short film
2017	The Perfect Girl	最完美的女孩	Lin Miao	

=== Television ===
Year	English title	Mandarin title	Role	Notes
2003	Seventh Grade Student	七年級生	An Yu-kan	
2004	Love Contract	愛情合約	Lin Kai	
2004	Love of Herb	香草戀人館	A-kuo	
2004	Nurses	男丁格爾		
2005	Express Boy	惡男宅急電	Lung-yen	
2006	Tokyo Juliet	東方茱麗葉	Cheng Nei-sih	
2008	Love or Bread	我的億萬麵包	Jin En-hao	
2010	17th Exit	十七號出入口	A-ting / A-hung	Film
2011	Way Back into Love	愛。回來	Mo Chih-pin	
2012	Be a Hero	俗辣英雄	A-chiu	Film
2013	True Love 365	求愛365	Lai Yuxiang	
2013	Our Love	愛的創可貼	Tang Shaolei	
2015	Pisces	星座愛情雙魚女	Lu Yi	
2015	Heart Of Steel	鋼鐵之心	Chin Ao-kei	
2015	Ghost Stories 4	聊齋新編之夜叉國	Xu Jinye	alternative title: Liao Zhai 4
2015	I Am Sorry, I Love You	我的鬼基友	Wang Shuhai	
2015	Taste of Love	唯一繼承者	Wen Feng (Chris)	
2016	Chong Xin. Mei Lai Guo	重新。沒來過	Chao Cheng-ting	Web-series
2017	Upstream	濁流	Stone	Film
2017	Tree in the River	动物系恋人啊	Qin Hao 秦豪	TV / Web Series
2021	We Best Love		Pei Shou-yi	TV / Web Series
2023	Uncle	阿叔	Wang Chia-lun	TV series

=== Music video appearances ===
Year	Artist	Song title
2002	Stella Chang	"Last One Night"
2003	Fish Leong	"Beautiful"
2003	Christine Fan	"Those Flowers"
2003	Pan Mei-chen	"Wǒ kě yǐ wéi nǐ dǎng sǐ"
2004	Angela Chang	"Fable"
2004	Mayday	"Superman"
2006	Liu Yifei	"Set Beauty Free"
2008	Jam Hsiao	"Forgive Me"
2008	Olivia Yan	"I Know"
2009	Genie Chuo	"Just a Second"
2010	S.H.E	"Love So Right"
2014	Jam Hsiao	"Anywhere Somewhere Nowhere"
2019	Coco Lee	"Broken"

== Theater ==
Year	English title	Mandarin title
2009	The Ugly One	醜男子

== Awards and nominations ==
Year	Award	Category	Nominated work	Result
2006	43rd Golden Horse Awards	Best New Performer	Eternal Summer	Won
