= Ariel Lin =

Taiwanese singer and actress (born 1982)

- 林依晨
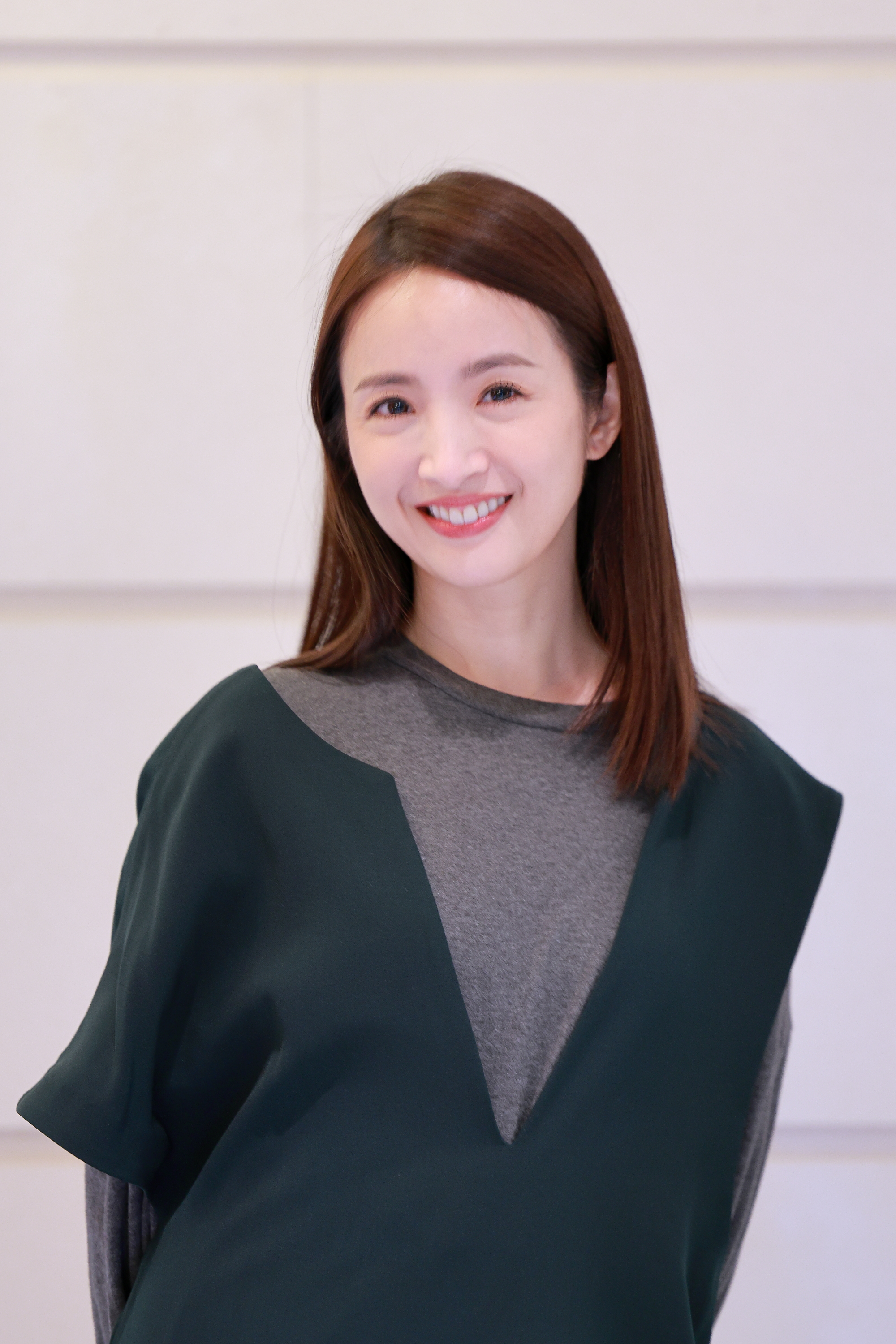
- Lin in 2024
- Born: 29 October 1982 (age 44); Yilan, Taiwan
- Education: National Chengchi University; Royal Central School of Speech and Drama
- Occupations: Actress; Singer
- Years active: 2002–present
- Agent: Zhouzi Entertainment (present)
- Spouse: Charles Lin (m. 2014)
- Children: 2
- Musical career
- Genre: Mandopop
- Instrument: Vocals
- Label: Avex Taiwan (2009–2010)

Chinese name
- Chinese: 林依晨
Transcriptions
Standard Mandarin
- Hanyu Pinyin: Lín Yīchén
- Website: linichen.net

Ariel Lin Yi-chen (Chinese: 林依晨; born 29 October 1982) is a Taiwanese actress and singer. She rose to fame for her role as Yuan Xiangqin in the Taiwanese drama It Started with a Kiss (2005) and the Chinese fantasy drama The Little Fairy (2006). Lin won Best Actress at the 43rd and 47th Golden Bell Awards for her roles in They Kiss Again (2007) and In Time with You (2011) respectively.

== Career ==
=== 2004: Beginnings ===
Lin was first discovered in a Taiwanese beauty contest. She made her debut in the television drama True Love 18 (2002). Lin also starred in her first film Love Me, If You Can (2004), which earned her a nomination for Best Actress at the 40th Golden Horse Awards. She gained more popularity after starring in the idol drama series My Secret Garden II and Love Contract opposite Mike He. She also sang the theme song for Love Contract, titled "Alone in the northern hemisphere", which topped the KTV and ring tone charts for 12 weeks.

=== 2005–2007: Breakthrough ===
Lin rose to mainstream popularity for her role as Yuan Xiangqin in the popular Taiwanese idol drama It Started with a Kiss (2005). The series topped ratings in Taiwan, and was a hit across Asia.

Lin then starred in her first Chinese drama, The Little Fairy (2006) where she played the Seventh Fairy Maiden. The series was extremely popular and had high ratings, marking her successful foray into the Chinese market. The same year, she starred in Tokyo Juliet alongside Wu Chun.

Lin reunited with Joe Cheng in They Kiss Again (2007), the sequel of It Started with a Kiss. The drama had an average rating of 3.43, becoming one of the highest rated idol dramas. Lin's performance in the drama won her the Best Actress award at the 43rd Golden Bell Awards, making her the first actress in history to win the award with an idol drama. The same year, she released the single "Adventure of Lunia" as the theme song for the video game Lunia: Record of Lunia War.

=== 2008–2013: Continued success and singing career ===
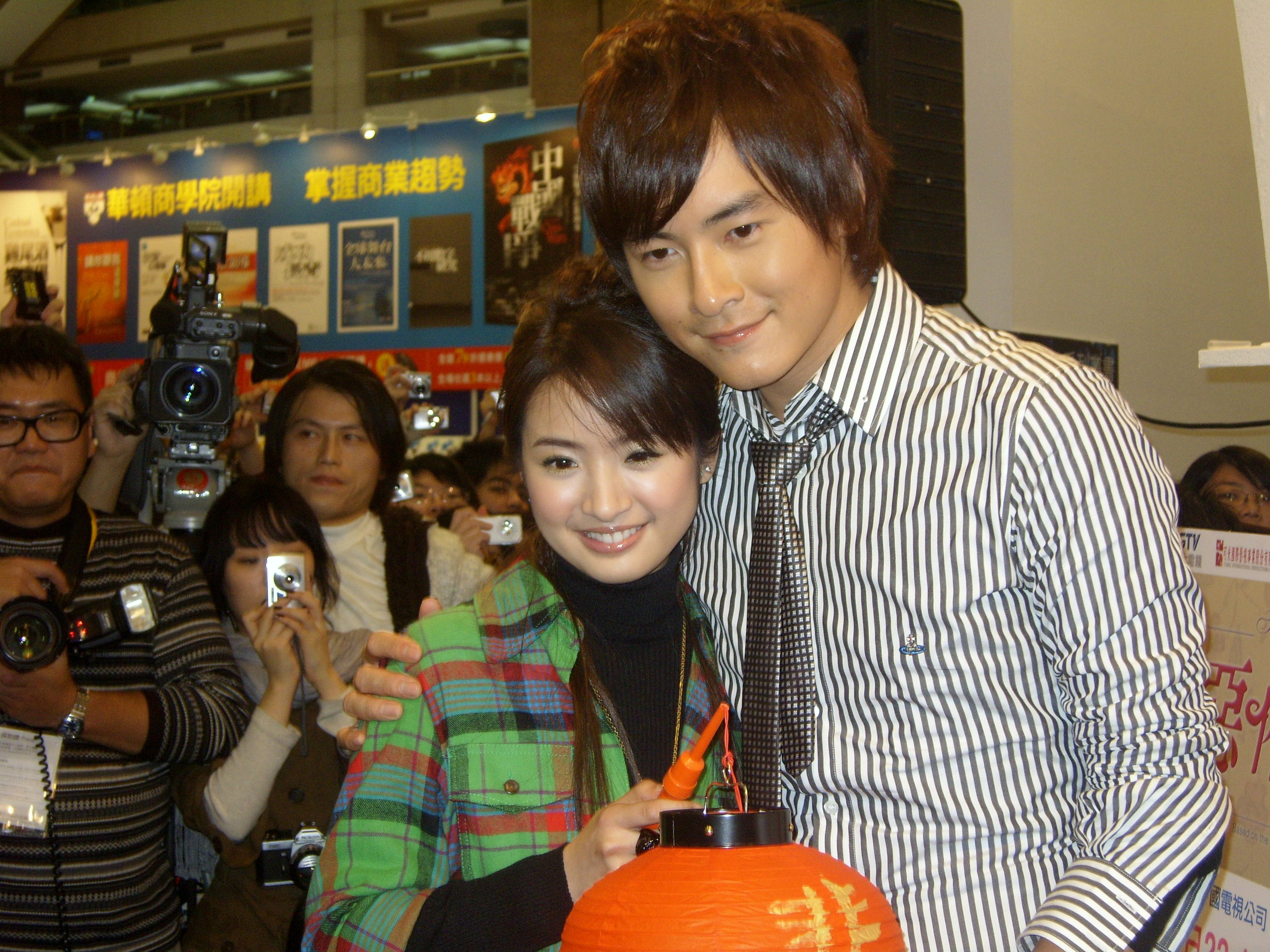
Lin and frequent co-star Joe Cheng at the 2008 Taipei International Book Exhibition.

Lin starred in the 2008 adaptation of Louis Cha's novel The Legend of the Condor Heroes. She plays Huang Rong, opposite her The Little Fairy co-star Hu Ge, who plays Guo Jing. She also starred in the Taiwanese drama Love or Bread, her third collaboration with Joe Cheng.

In 2009, Lin signed a three-year and three-album contract with Avex Taiwan. She released her first album, Blissful Encounter, which sold 20,000 copies within 2 days. The same year, she starred in her first theater play, The War and Peace between Men and Women.

Lin then starred in romance drama In Time with You (2011), co-starring Bolin Chen. It was the highest rated Taiwanese idol drama of the year and was extremely popular across Asia. Lin won her Golden Bell Award for Best Actress trophy for her performance in the series. She then starred alongside Feng Shaofeng in the historical drama Prince of Lan Ling (2013). In 2013, she was listed by Forbes as the 85th most influential celebrity in China.

=== 2014–present: Films ===
Following her television career, Lin focused on films. In 2014, she starred in the crime caper Sweet Alibis alongside Alec Su. It was chosen as the Most Popular Taiwanese Film at the 6th Straits Film and Television Awards. Lin then starred in Go Lala Go 2 (2015), the sequel to the 2010 hit film Go Lala Go!. However unlike its predecessor, it was a critical and commercial flop.

Lin turned to the thriller genre in The Mysterious Family (2017), playing a rape victim who becomes psychologically scarred after the incident. The same year, she was cast in the television drama Old Boy alongside Liu Ye, marking her small-screen comeback after 4 years.

In 2018, Lin was cast in the historical drama I Will Never Let You Go as the protagonist.

== Personal life ==
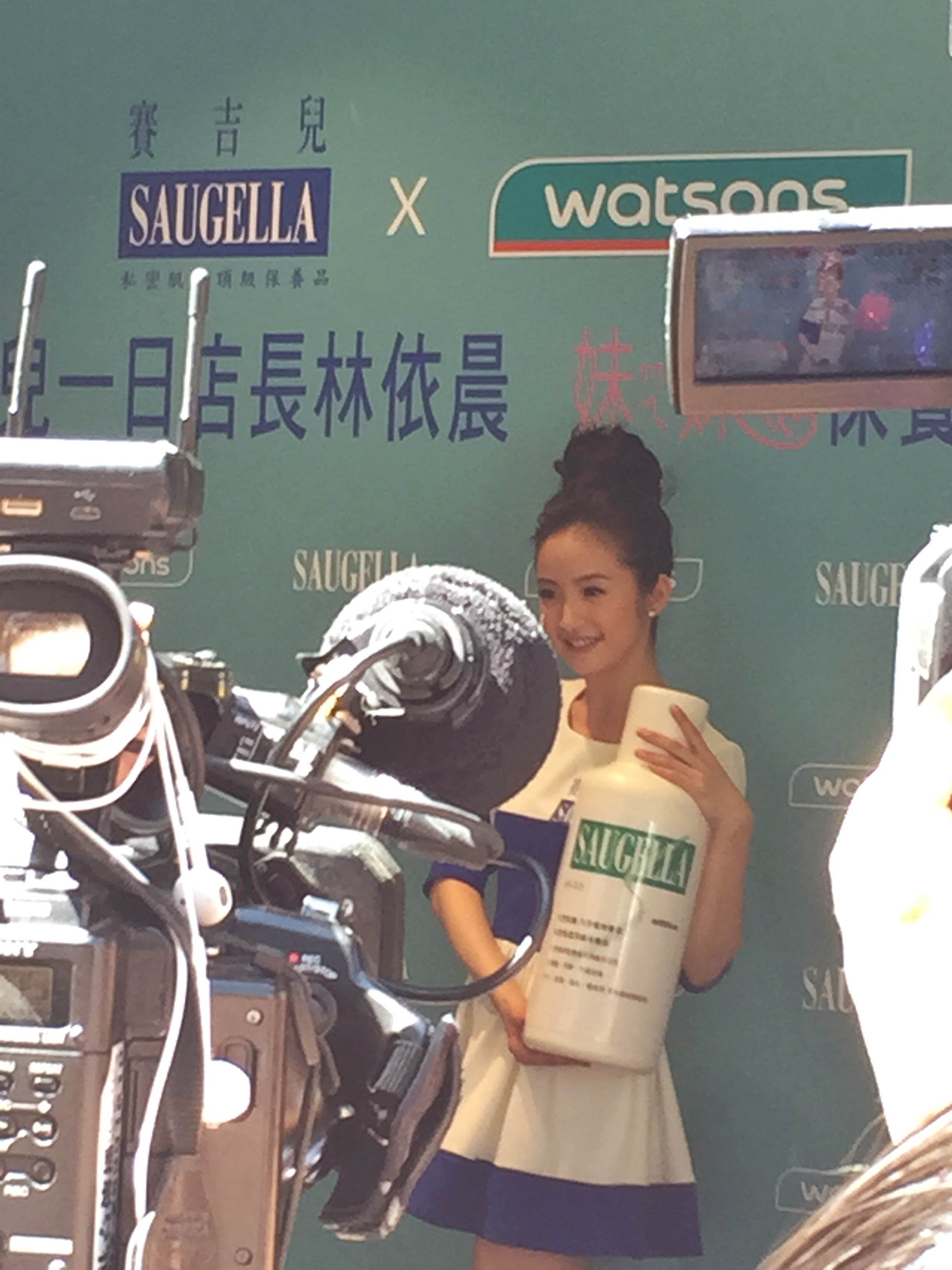
Lin in 2015

Lin was born in Yilan, Taiwan to a middle-income family. She has a younger brother. Her parents separated when she was very young and divorced when she was in high school. (Lin helped reconcile them in 2014.) Lin was raised by her mother and lived in poverty for many years. She began taking care of the family in her second year of high school after her mother suffered a cerebellar stroke. At age 18, she entered a beauty competition because she wanted to win the prize money and buy her brother a new computer. She won first place. She was also accepted to National Chengchi University, a top university in Taiwan. She graduated with a BA in Korean literature while working as an actress part-time. When she filmed in China, several of her classmates copied notes for her.

Lin is severely myopic (-7.0D) and wears contact lenses. In June 2008, Lin was diagnosed with a 2 cm cyst on her pituitary gland, following which she had an operation in February 2009.

In 2013, she decided to take a break from her career. She went to United Kingdom and obtained a Master of Arts (MA) in Acting for Screen from the Royal Central School of Speech and Drama, University of London in 2014.

On 24 December 2014, Lin married businessman Charles Lin. The couple were introduced by mutual friends. On 29 September 2021, Lin announced her pregnancy hours after media broke the news. She gave birth to a girl on 18 October that year. She wrote a book during her pregnancy, which topped Books.com.tw's bestseller lists (both print and e-book) when it was published in January 2022. On 16 June 2025, she announced the birth of her second child, a son, born on June 14.

== Filmography ==
=== Film ===
Year	English title	Original title	Role	Notes/Ref.
2003	Kung Fu Girls	空手道少女組	Ye Lizhu/Juliet-Zhuliye	
2004	Love Me, If You Can	飛躍情海	Lin Xiaoying	
2004	Free As Love	飛躍情海之浮生若夢	Lin Xiaoying	
2005	Herbie: Fully Loaded	—N/a	Maggie Peyton	Taiwanese version, voice
2011	Memory Loss	憶世界大冒險	Hsiao-ta	Voice
2011	Love Sick	戀愛恐慌症	Liang Ruoqing	
2014	Sweet Alibis	甜蜜殺機	Gao Yiping	
2015	Another Woman	234說愛你	Jian Peiyan	
2015	Go Lala Go 2	追婚日記	Du Lala	
2016	Love Is Frozen	愛情凍住了	Tseng Mei-bao	
2016	Trippin' in Taipei	迷途台北	Hye	Short film; Also producer
2017	The Mysterious Family	神秘家族	Miao Miao	
2017	A Choo	不倒俠	Xinxin	
2023	Be With Me	車頂上的玄天上帝	Fu-yue	

=== Television series ===
Year	English title	Original title	Role	Notes/Ref.
1990	Fire Phoenix	浴火鳳凰	Mei Ji and Mei Yin Shuang when they turned into phoenixes burned	Stuntwoman
2002	True Love 18	18歲的約定	Xia Xiaotong	
2002	Purple Corner	紫色角落	Stacy	Cameo
2003	Friends	名揚四海	Xiao Yanru (Little Yanru)	Cameo
2003	Secret Garden	我的秘密花園	Fan Xiaomin	
2003	Seventh Grade	七年級生	Wu Yali	
2004	Secret Garden II	我的秘密花園 II	Fan Xiaomin	
2004	Love Contract	愛情合約	Cheng Xiaofeng/Xiaofeng	
2005	It Started with a Kiss	惡作劇之吻	Yuan Xiangqin	
2006	The Little Fairy/Fairy From Wonderland	天外飛仙	Seventh Fairy/Long Guangbiao/Yu Xiao Qi	
2006	Tokyo Juliet	東方茱麗葉	Lin Laisui/Stephanie Lin	
2007	They Kiss Again	惡作劇2吻	Yuan Xiangqin; Huang Qiuju	
2008	The Legend of the Condor Heroes	射鵰英雄傳	Huang Rong	
2008	Love or Bread	我的億萬麵包	Zeng Shanmei	
2011	In Time with You	我可能不會愛你	Cheng Yu-ching	
2013	Prince of Lan Ling	蘭陵王	Yang Xuewu	
2018	Old Boy	老男孩	Lin Xiao'ou	
2019	I Will Never Let You Go	小女花不棄	Hua Buqi	
2024	Imperfect Us	不夠善良的我們	Chien Ching-fen	

== Theatre ==
Year	English title	Original title
2009–2010	Man and Woman, War and Peace	男人與女人之戰爭與和平

== Discography ==
=== Studio albums ===
Year	English title	Original title	Released date	Label
2007	Adventure of Lunia	路尼亞戰記	19 November 2007	
2009	Blissful Encounter	幸福遇見	10 July 2009	Avex Taiwan
2010	A Wonderful Journey	美好的旅行	21 August 2010	Avex Taiwan

=== Singles ===
Year	English title	Original title	Notes
2003	"Kung Fu Girls"	空手道少女組	Kung Fu Girls original soundtrack
2004	"Cha Cha"		My Secret Garden II original soundtrack
2004	"Lonely Northern Hemisphere"	孤單北半球	Love Contract ending theme song
2005	"The Way Home"	歸途	April Snow original soundtrack (Chinese version)
2006	"It Had to Be You"	非你莫屬	Tokyo Juliet ending theme song
2007	"Angel Wings"	天使的翅膀	The song dedicated to Beatrice Hsu
2007	"You"	你	They Kiss Again ending theme song
2007	"Record of Lunia War"	路尼亞戰記主題曲	Lunia: Record of Lunia War theme song
2008	"If it is you"	如果是你	Album 如果是你 of Alex, member of 艾力克斯 - Korea music group (Chinese version)
2008	"The Taste of Bread"	麵包的滋味	Love or Bread ending theme song
2010	"Guardian Star"	守護星	Prius Online theme song
2011	"Wings"	翅膀	In Time with You original soundtrack

=== Music video ===
- 2001:
  - Believe - 相信 (May day - 五月天) 2001
  - Lonely Flight - 寂寞飛行 (Maggie Chiang - 江美琪) 2001
  - Nunchuks - 雙截棍 (Jay Chow 周杰倫) 2001
  - Paper Flight - 紙飛機 (Sandy Lam - 林憶蓮) 2001
- 2002:
  - MAKE A WISH (Vic Chou - 周渝民) 2002
  - Love Guardian 鎮守愛情 (Power Staton - 動力火車) 2002
  - Angel (David Tao - 陶吉吉) 2002
- 2003:
  - Friends 名扬四海 - Rainbow (You Chiu-Hsing 尤秋興 of Power Station 動力火車) 2003
  - She's having my baby (Tension) 2003
- 2004:
  - Secret Garden II 我的秘密花園 II - 單純的臉孔 (Zhang Jian) 2004
  - Cha Cha (Secret Garden II OST - 我的秘密花園 II 電視原聲帶) (Ariel Lin - 林依晨, Cheryl Yang - 楊謹華, Yolin Liang - 梁又琳, Michelle Lin - 林立雯, Marcus - 張天霖 và Daniel Lee - 李岳) 2004
  - Love Contract 愛情合約原聲帶-孤單北半球 2004 (Ariel Lin - 林依晨) 2004
  - Love Contract 愛情合約原聲帶-中間 (Fish Leong - 梁静茹) 2004
  - Love Contract 愛情合約原聲帶 - Shinning (丸子) 2004
  - Love Contract 愛情合約原聲帶 - 失去 (A-Yue 張震嶽) 2004
  - Love Contract 愛情合約原聲帶 - 關於我們之間的事 (A-Yue 張震嶽) 2004
  - Love Contract 愛情合約原聲帶 - 中間（鋼琴版）(潘協慶) 2004
  - 孤單北半球 (Ariel Lin - 林依晨) 2004
  - Waiting for You - 字幕歌词 (Asnon Hu - 胡彦斌) (Love Contract MV) 2004
  - 白月光 (Jeff Chang - 张信哲) 2004 (Ariel Lin dub Korean for the girl in the MV)
- 2005:
  - It Started with a Kiss 惡作劇之吻 - Say you love me (Jason & 温岚) 2005
  - It Started with a Kiss 惡作劇之吻 - Meet 遇到 (方雅賢) 2005
  - It Started with a Kiss 惡作劇之吻 - Come A Little Closer 靠近一點點 (梁心頤)
  - It Started with a Kiss 惡作劇之吻 - Can We 能不能 (Jason Wang 王威登 & Lady Wen 溫嵐) 2005
  - It Started with a Kiss 惡作劇之吻 - The Whole World Could Hear 全世界的人都知道 (王俞勻) 2005
  - It Started with a Kiss 惡作劇之吻 - Regret 後悔 (何書宇) 2005
  - It Started with a Kiss 惡作劇之吻 - 惡作劇 (王藍茵) 2005
  - Born in A Troubled Time - 亂世浮生 (May day - 五月天) 2005
  - 惡作劇 (王藍茵) 2005
- 2006:
  - The Little Fairy 天外飛仙 - 一眼萬年 (S.H.E) 2006
  - The Little Fairy 天外飛仙 - 千年淚 (Tank) 2006
  - The Little Fairy 天外飛仙 - 天亮以後 (Hu Ge - 胡歌) 2006
  - The Little Fairy 天外飛仙 - 古靈精怪 (吳艾倫 & 林靜) 2006
  - The Little Fairy 天外飛仙 - 月光 (Hu Ge - 胡歌) 2006
  - The Little Fairy 天外飛仙 - 棋只 2006
  - Tokyo Juliet 東方茱麗葉 - 逆風 (花園精靈) 2006
  - Tokyo Juliet 東方茱麗葉 - It Had To Be You 非你莫屬 (Ariel Lin - 林依晨) 2006
  - Good friend - 好朋友 (Alan Luo - 羅志祥) 2006
- 2007:
  - Angel Wings - 天使的翅膀 (published in Beatrice Hsu 2007 Light Concert by Xu Zhiwei - 许志玮, Ariel Lin - 林依晨, Joe Cheng - 郑元畅, Rainie Yang - 杨丞琳, Mike He - 贺军翔, Cyndi Wang - 王心凌, Phoebe Huang - 黄嘉千, Wallace Huo - 霍建华, David Chen - 陈宇凡, Penny Lin - 林韦君, Eli Shih - 施易男, Van Fan - 范逸臣, Cheryl Yang - 杨谨华, Victor Wong - 品冠, Alien Huang - 黃鴻升, Ben Pai - 白吉胜,... ) 2007
  - Adventure of Lunia - 路尼亞戰記 (Ariel Lin - 林依晨) 2007
  - They Kiss Again 惡作劇2吻 - 幸福合作社 (Mavis Fan - 范曉萱) 2007
  - They Kiss Again 惡作劇2吻 - 你 (Ariel Lin - 林依晨) 2007
- 2008:
  - Beating Heart 跳动的心 (Justin Lo - 側田) 2008
  - Love or Bread 我的億萬麵包 - 歐兜水 (Huang Wen-hsing - 黃文星) 2008

=== TV commercial ===
- 2001:
  - TrainAsia 2U PrePaidCard (2001)
  - TrainAsia 2U PrePaidCard CDbox (2001)
  - TrainAsia 2U PrePaidCard KTV (2001)
- 2003:
  - Jcode CF Meetings (2003) (Ariel Lin and Dylan Kuo)
  - Xin Gui Bai Strawberry Biscuit CF 1 (2003) (Ariel Lin and Bryant Chang)
  - Jcode CF Restaurant (2003) (Ariel Lin and Dylan Kuo)
  - Xin Gui Bai Strawberry Biscuit CF 2 (2003)(Ariel Lin and Bryant Chang)
  - Jcode CF Ghost House (2003) (Ariel Lin and Dylan Kuo)
  - Xin Gui Bai Strawberry Biscuit CF 2 (2003)
- 2004:
  - Jcode CF Valentines (2/2004) (Ariel Lin and Dylan Kuo)
  - Jcode CF Motorcycle (2004)
  - Contact Lens Solution CF (2004)
- 2005:
  - Jcode CF Reminder (2/2005) (Ariel Lin and Mike He)
  - Jcode CF Love (8/2005) (Ariel Lin and Mike He)
  - Heme CF Romeo Juliet (12/2005) (Ariel Lin and Vic Chou)
- 2006:
  - Jcode CF Love (1/2006) (Ariel Lin and Mike He)
  - Jcode CF Slow Dance (2/2006) (Ariel Lin and Mike He)
  - Sofy CF Puzzle (4/2006)
  - Heme CF Romeo Juliet (5/2006) (Ariel Lin and Vic Chou)
  - Green Tea CF Shopping (5/2006)
  - Sofy CF Sleep In (9/2006)
  - Green Tea CF Field (10/2006)
  - Heme Commercial (11/2006)
  - Heme CF Red Dress (11/2006)
- 2007:
  - Heme CF Whack a Mole (1/2007)
  - 711 Snoopy CF 1 (1/2007)
  - 711 Snoopy CF Search (1/2007)
  - 711 Snoopy CF Camera 1 (2/2007)
  - 711 Snoopy CF Camera 2 (2/2007)
  - Sofy CF Good Night Rest (2/2007)
  - Qqueen CF (5/2007)
  - 711 Snoopy CF Baseball (7/2007)

== Bibliography ==
Year	English title	Original title	Notes
2005	Ariel's Blog	林家女孩依晨的青春部落格	ISBN 9576799775
2008	Ariel Lin's New York Bagel Diary	林依晨的紐約貝果日記	ISBN 9789868414341
2010	Ariel's A Wonderful Journey	美好的旅行	ISBN 9789866606991
2022	Be Yourself, Why Do You Say Sorry?	做自己，為什麼還要說抱歉？	ISBN 9789570861471

== Awards and nominations ==
Year	Award	Category	Nominated work	Result
2003	40th Golden Horse Awards	Best Actress	Love Me, If You Can	Nominated
2008	43rd Golden Bell Awards	Best Actress	They Kiss Again	Won
2012	47th Golden Bell Awards	Best Actress	In Time with You	Won
2014	13th Huading Awards	Best Actress (Ancient drama)	Prince of Lan Ling	Nominated
2015	10th Seoul International Drama Awards	Asia Star Grand Award	—N/a	Won
2024	6th Asia Contents Awards & Global OTT Awards	Best Lead Actress	Imperfect Us	Won
2024	59th Golden Bell Awards	Best Leading Actress in a Miniseries or TV Film	Imperfect Us	Nominated
2025	62nd Golden Horse Awards	Best Leading Actress	Deep Quiet Room	Nominated
