= In the Family (magazine) =

Former American print periodical

In the Family: The Magazine for Queer People and Their Loved Ones (In the Family Magazine) was a quarterly, print magazine published from 1995-2005 in the United States by Family Magazine, Inc. Drawing on the expertise of psychotherapy and family therapy, it explored individual, couple, and family dynamics of LGBT people as well as their heterosexual loved ones. The magazine was based in Tucson, Arizona.

== History ==
The magazine was founded by Laura Markowitz, a National Magazine Award-winning writer and editor who covered the field of family therapy as a senior editor for the Family Therapy Networker (now called Psychotherapy Networker).

In the Family Magazine was originally subtitled The Magazine for Lesbians, Gays, Bisexuals and Their Relations, but changed to The Magazine for Queer People and Their Loved Ones as the publication began more regularly to cover issues related to transgender people and their families.

After its 40th issue, the magazine ceased publication, in June 2005. EBSCO Publishing licensed the full text of In the Family Magazine for its online databases. ProQuest acquired the nonexclusive rights to distribute In the Family Magazine content through its Ethnic NewsWatch, GenderWatch, and Alt PressWatch databases.

== Awards ==
In 1997, In the Family Magazine won the Excellence in the Media Award from the American Association for Marriage and Family Therapy for its coverage of LGBT parenting. In 2004, the magazine's Markowitz won the award for Innovative Contribution to the Field of Family Therapy from the American Family Therapy Academy.

== Annual conferences ==
From 1998 to 2001, In the Family Magazine sponsored annual conferences for mental health professionals. These took place in San Francisco, and featured keynote addresses, panels, and small sessions on LGBT family, family therapy, and psychology.
