= Corner with Love =

- Promotion poster
- Also known as: 轉角*遇到愛; Zhuán Jiǎo Yùdào Aì; Love at the Corner
- Genre: Romance, comedy
- Directed by: Lin He Long
- Starring: Show Lo; Barbie Hsu
- Opening theme: "愛的勇氣" (Love's Courage) by Megan Lai
- Ending theme: "愛*轉角" (Love*Corner) by Show Lo
- Country of origin: Republic of China (Taiwan)
- Original language: Mandarin
- No. of episodes: 16

Production
- Producer: Angie Chai
- Production locations: Taipei, Kaohsiung and Shanghai
- Running time: 90 minutes (Sundays at 22:00)
- Production company: Comic Ritz International Production

Original release
- Network: China Television (CTV)
- Release: 7 January – 22 April 2007

Related
- Star Apple Garden (星蘋果樂園); The Teen Age (18 禁不禁)

Corner With Love (Chinese: 轉角＊遇到愛; pinyin: Zhuán Jiǎo Yùdào Aì) is a 2007 Taiwanese drama starring Show Lo and Barbie Hsu (aka Da S). It was produced by Comic Ritz International Production (可米瑞智國際藝能有限公司) with Angie Chai (柴智屏) and Huang Jing (黃京) as producers and directed by Lin Helong (林合隆). The drama started filming in May 2006 and wrapped on 13 August 2006. It was filmed on location in Taipei and Kaohsiung in Taiwan; and in Shanghai, China.

It was first broadcast in Taiwan on free-to-air China Television (CTV) from 7 January 2007 to 22 April 2007, on Sundays at 22:00. It was also shown on cable TV Eastern Television (ETTV) from 22 January 2007 on Saturdays at 16:30.

Corner With Love was nominated for Best Marketing Programme of the Year at the 42nd Golden Bell Awards in 2007.

== Plot ==
Xinlei is an intelligent, confident and beautiful girl who has never known a day of hardship. Her father is a wealthy business tycoon in Shanghai and she is engaged to Yin Shangdong who in her eyes is also perfect in every way. She lives a life of fairytale as everyone dote and treat her like a princess. Until one day, she meets Qin Lang, when her car and his bicycle crash into each other by accident at a corner. Qin Lang is a frustrated artist whose father abandoned him and his mother to pursue his passion for painting. He went to Shanghai with the hopes of pursuing his dream of becoming an artist but was cheated out of his money, passport and plane ticket. In order to earn enough money to go home to Taiwan he works as a cook, making oyster omelette, a skill passed down by his grandmother.

Xinlei and Qin Lang meet again when she goes to a restaurant that specialises in Taiwanese food, that Qin Lang happens to works at. She wanted to learn how to make oyster omelette, in order to impress her fiancé's parents with her cooking skills. He is initially reluctant to teach her as he is annoyed by her princess complex but at the same time, he is drawn to her. After much bickering and mis-understanding they become friends.

Then, Xinlei's parents' company goes bankrupt and they go into hiding to escape their debtors. They mistakenly thought that Shangdong would take care of her, hence only left her a plane ticket and a key to their house in Taiwan. Unfortunately, Shangdong breaks off their engagement, at the insistence of his parents, and becomes engaged to another girl whose family can help them financially. Meanwhile, Xinlei is left to rely on her best friend Xi Xian and Qin Lang, who found himself wanting to protect her and does everything in his power to cheer her up. However at the bidding of his grandmother, he had to leave Xibei to return to Taiwan, thinking that they would never meet again. Then, after seeing Xinlei at his engagement party, Shangdong is unable to go through with it. So his parents asked her to break away and leave Shanghai. Whereupon she goes to Taiwan to stay in the house her parents left her.

Coincidentally, it turns out that the house that was left to Xinlei by her parents is Qin Lang's house. Xinlei tried to drive Qin Lang's family out of the house which infuriated his grandmother and wanted Xinlei out of the house since she can show no proof of ownership of the house. Knowing that Xinlei has nowhere else to go, Qin Lang lied to his grandmother saying that Xinlei is his girlfriend who is now penniless and homeless and plead to let her stay. The grandmother reluctantly lets her stay under the condition that she has to help with the household chores and she has to find a job and pay her rent for staying in the house.

A series of unfortunate events happen which leads Xinlei to face up to her life's situation and learn to adapt to her new environment. She is unable to give up her princess complex but little by little, warmed up to Qin Lang's family and the kind of life they live. In the end, she would have to make a choice between staying as a princess in her castle or to lead a simple life of a commoner for love.

== Cast ==
- Show Lo as Qin Lang (秦朗)
- Barbie Hsu as Yu Xinlei (俞心蕾)
- Chen Zhikai (陳至愷) as Yin Shangdong (尹尚東)
- Lu Jiaxin (路嘉欣) as Cai Xiaoyang (蔡小陽)
- Dean Fujioka as An Tengfeng (安藤楓)
- Fang Fang (方芳) as Du Danpo (牡丹婆 aka 阿嫲)
- Harlem Yu as Lian Shengquan (連勝全)
- Carolyn Chen (陳珮騏) as Wen Bizhu (溫碧珠)
- Zhang Liwei (張立威) as A Da (阿達)
- Chen Yanru (陳彥儒) as Jiu Badao (九把刀)
- Alien Huang as A Yi (阿義)
- Fan Ming as Cui Ge (崔哥)
- Jiang Chao as Xiao Pang (小胖)
- Xiao Jian as Bao Cheren (包車仁)
- Shen Mengsheng (沈孟生) as Qin Hai (秦海)

== Ratings ==
Before the pilot episode was aired, Barbie Hsu bet that Corner 's highest rating would be around 2.9, while Chai Zhiping bet on around 3.3. It ended up posting a final average of 2.81, with a peak at around 3.25.

China Television (CTV) Ratings
Original Broadcast Date	Episode #	Average	Rank	Peak	Notes
7 January 2007	Section 1	2.856	2	3.25	
14 January 2007	Section 2	3.2	2	3.62	
21 January 2007	Section 3	3.46	2	4.17	
28 January 2007	Section 4	3.29	2	3.92	
4 February 2007	Section 5	4.12	2	5.06	
11 February 2007	Section 6	3.94	2	4.94	
18 February 2007	Section 7	3.18	2	3.59	
25 February 2007	Section 8	2.57	2	3.04	
4 March 2007	Section 9	3.47	2	3.59	CTS Hanazakarino Kimitachihe series finale TTV Engagement for Love series finale
11 March 2007	Section 10	3.42	1	3.93	Peaked: 6.24 in the 15 to 24 age range. CTS Summer x Summer premiere TTV My Lucky Star premiere
18 March 2007	Section 11	3.64	1	4.17	
25 March 2007	Section 12	3.94	1	4.56	
1 April 2007	Section 13	4.0	1	4.30	
8 April 2007	Section 14	4.07	1	4.75	
15 April 2007	Section 15	3.96	1	4.53	
22 April 2007	Section 16	3.75	1	4.75	
Average		3.55			

== Soundtrack ==
Corner with Love

Soundtrack album by Various Artists
- Released: 19 January 2007
- Genre: Mandopop
- Language: Mandarin
- Label: Sony Music Entertainment (Taiwan)

Corner * With Love Original Soundtrack (轉角*遇到愛 電視原聲帶) was released on 19 January 2007 by Various Artists under Sony Music Entertainment (Taiwan). It contains twelve songs, in which four songs are various instrumental versions of the six original songs. "Ai De Yongqi" or "Love's Courage" by Megan Lai (賴雅妍) was the opening theme song of the series.

=== Track listing ===
No.	Title	Singer(s)	Length
1.	"Love's Courage" (愛的勇氣 (Ai De Yong Qi))	Megan Lai (賴雅妍)
2.	"I Want To Say" (我想要說)	Evan Yo
3.	"Should Forget You" (該忘了你對不對)	Where Chou (周蕙)
4.	"Will Forget Today Tomorrow" (明天要把昨天忘記)	David Huang (黃大煒)
5.	"I Can" (我可以)	Evan Yo
6.	"Discovery" (發現)	Where Chou (周蕙)
7.	"Only Me" (只有一個自己)	David Huang (黃大煒)
8.	"Can You Hear Me"	Evan Yo
9.	"I Can inst." (我可以)
10.	"Stars version inst." (小星星變奏曲)
11.	"Romantic version inst." (問候歌)
12.	"I Want To Say inst." (我想要說)

In addition, there are two songs not included in the original soundtrack: The ending theme song entitled "Ai Zhuan Jiao" or "Love*Corner", and an insert song, "Ji Fen" or "How Many Points", both by Show Lo released in his 4th album Speshow Corner With Love Special Edition.

== Bibliography ==
- Corner * With Love TV Drama Novel (轉角*遇到愛電視小說) - ISBN 978-957-803-613-0
- Corner * With Love TV Drama Novel (Kingstone Limited Edition) (轉角*遇到愛電視小說 金石堂限量版) - ISBN 957-803-613-2
- Corner * With Love (轉角*遇到愛珍藏手繪本) - Author: Giddens Ko (九把刀) - ISBN 957-803-618-3
