= Myself World Tour (album) =

2013 live video album by Jolin Tsai

- Standard edition cover

Live album by Jolin Tsai
- Released: October 19, 2013
- Recorded: December 22–23, 2012
- Venues: Taipei Arena (Taipei, Taiwan)
- Genre: Pop
- Length: 1:48:28
- Labels: Warner; Mars

Jolin Tsai chronology
Muse (2012)	Myself World Tour (2013)	Play (2014)

Myself World Tour (Chinese: Myself世界巡迴演唱會 台北安可場) is a live video album by Taiwanese singer Jolin Tsai, released on October 19, 2013, by Warner. The album features footage from Tsai's live performances during the Myself World Tour held at the Taipei Arena from December 22 to 23, 2012, along with the music video for one of the songs.

== Background ==
On December 24, 2010, Tsai launched her third concert tour, the Myself World Tour, at the Taipei Arena. The tour concluded on April 13, 2013, at the Kaohsiung Arena. Spanning two years and four months, the tour covered 31 cities with a total of 35 shows, attracting over 600,000 attendees and generating more than NT$1.5 billion in box office revenue. On September 27, 2013, Warner announced that the live video album of the Myself World Tour would be available for pre-order starting October 2, and officially released on October 19.

== Release and promotion ==
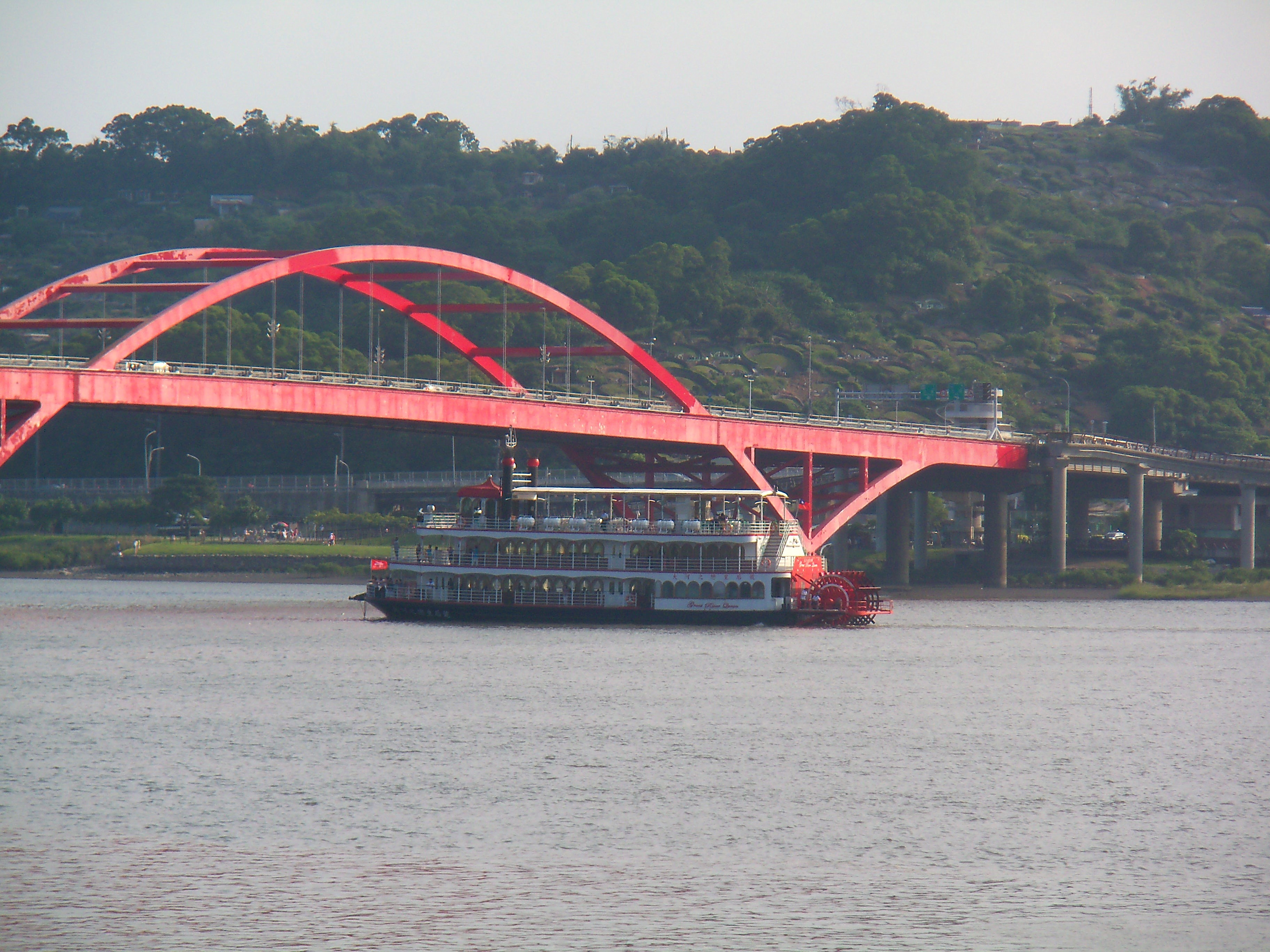
On October 18, 2013, Tsai held a premiere for the album aboard the "Great River Queen" cruise ship.

The album was released in two editions: the standard edition and the limited edition. The former includes 39 live performance tracks along with the music video for the song "Journey". The latter builds upon this by additionally featuring behind-the-scenes footage from the tour, a duo pole dance performance from the Kaohsiung concert, and a specially edited solo pole dance performance video. Warner revealed that several songs in the album were licensed from Tsai's former labels, D Sound and Sony, making it her most comprehensive live concert video release to date.

On October 2, 2013, Tsai held a press conference in Taipei to mark the start of the album's pre-order campaign. On October 18, 2013, she held a premiere for the album aboard the "Great River Queen" cruise ship at Tamsui Ferry Pier in New Taipei City. On November 6, 2013, Tsai opened the Myself World Tour Special Exhibition at the Huashan 1914 Creative Park in Taipei, showcasing 16 tour costumes and various stage props. The exhibition concluded on November 10, 2013.

== Commercial performance ==
The album topped the weekly video album sales charts at major retailers in Taiwan, including Pok'elai, Eslite, Chia Chia, G-Music, and Five Music. It also ranked number three on Kuang Nan's annual video album sales chart and claimed the number one spot on Five Music's annual video album sales chart.

== Accolades ==
On March 27, 2014, the album received the award for Best Concert Video at the inaugural QQ Music Awards.

== Track listing ==
Myself World Tour – Standard edition (DVD 1)
No.	Title	Lyrics	Music	Length
1.	"Opening VCR"			2:31
2.	"Honey Trap"	Luke Tsui; Gino Chen	Danielle Senior; Scott Wild	2:48
3.	"Pulchritude"	Luke Tsui	Lars Quang; Thea Winkelmann	3:49
4.	"Black-Haired Beautiful Girl"	Matthew Yen	Jonas Saeed; Pia Sjöberg	2:34
5.	"Butterfly"	Matthew Yen	Anders Kjer; David Clewett; Alice Gernandt	3:34
6.	"The Great Artist"	Matthew Yen	Robin Jessen; Anne Judith Wik; Nermin Harambasic; Ronny Svendsen; Charite Viken Reinas; Eirik Johansen; Alexander Puntervold	3:21
7.	"Mosaic"	Tom Wang	JJ Lin	4:07
8.	"36 Tricks of Love"	Kiki Hu	Savan Kotecha; Andrew Frampton; Wayne Wilkins	3:11
9.	"Tacit Violence"	Issac Chen; Howard Chiang; Sunny Lee	Nik Quang; Thea Hall; Lars Quang; RnG	3:02
10.	"Sky"	Wesley Chia	Wesley Chia; Kiki Hu	1:52
11.	"Wandering Poet"	Peggy Hsu	Peggy Hsu	4:50
12.	"Agent J"	Sunny Lee; Matthew Yen; Neoh Kim Hin	Ooi Teng Fong	2:50
13.	"Beast"	Jolin Tsai	Tarmo Keranen; Karin Fransson	2:41
14.	"Love Player"	Gino Chen	Gabriel Ssezibwa; Rene Prang; Lars Quang; Nik Quang	3:27
15.	"Signature Gesture"	Issac Chen	Edward Chan; Charles Lee	1:57
16.	"Real Man"	Issac Chen	Jonas Jeberg; Mikkel Sigvardt; Mich Hansen; Nina Woodford	1:21
17.	"Overlooking Purposely"	Sunny Lee; Francis Lee	Mads Hauge; Vincent DeGiorgio	3:06
18.	"I Know You're Feeling Blue"	Kiki Hu	Jimmy Ye	1:25
19.	"Heart Breaking Day"	Matthew Yen	Alex Fung	0:52
20.	"The Prologue"	Jolin Tsai	Xiao Yu	0:55
21.	"Fall in Love with a Street"	Hsieh Meng-chuan	Nobuhiro Makino	0:54
22.	"Can't Speak Clearly"	Mao Mao	Jay Chou	1:32
23.	"The Smell of Lemon Grass"	Francis Lee	Peter Lee	1:34
24.	"Compromise"	Howard Chiang	Real Huang; Real Band	1:13
25.	"Pretence"	Howard Chiang	Howard Ku	2:05
26.	"Rewind"	Vincent Fang	Jay Chou	2:37
Total length:				64:08

Myself World Tour – Standard edition (DVD 2)
No.	Title	Lyrics	Music	Length
1.	"Don't Stop"	Mao Mao	Rachel Stevens; Hannah Spearritt; Bradley McIntosh; Jon Lee; Paul Cattermole; Jo O'Meara; Tina Barrett; Eliot Kennedy; Mike Percy; Tim Lever	1:22
2.	"A Wonder in Madrid"	Alang Huang	Hagen Troy	1:35
3.	"Friday the 13th"	Jimmy Chou	Pasi Siitonen; Adam Powers; Nalle Ahlstedt	1:57
4.	"Sun Will Never Set"	Luke Tsui	Alexander Bard; Anders Hansson	3:41
5.	"Mr. Q"	Issac Chen	Miriam Nervo; Olivia Nervo; Ben Thomas; Dele Ladimeji	3:14
6.	"Butterflies in My Stomach"	Andrew Chen; Gino Chen	Andrew Chen	1:19
7.	"Dancing Diva"	Issac Chen	Miriam Nervo; Olivia Nervo; Greg Kurstin	1:47
8.	"Fantasy"	Greeny Wu	Mikko Tamminen; Udo Mechels; Rike Boomgaarden	2:22
9.	"Dr. Jolin"	Peggy Hsu	Iggy Strange Dahl; Johan Moraeus; Christoffer Vikberg	2:54
10.	"Dancing Forever"	Issac Chen	Roger Olsson; Klas Johan Wahl; Nick Whitecross	4:03
11.	"I"	Xiao Han	Tanya Chua	4:15
12.	"J-Game"	Issac Chen	Jonas Nordelius; Andreas Levander; Awa Manneh	2:57
13.	"Magic"	Issac Chen	Edward Chan; Charles Lee	2:35
14.	"Bravo Lover"	Issac Chen	Lina Rafn; Adam Powers; Paw Lagermann	6:43
15.	"Journey" (music video)	Matthew Yen	Jaakko Salovaara; Park Geun-tae; Nalle Ahlstedt	3:36
Total length:				44:20

Myself World Tour – Limited edition (DVD 3)
No.	Title	Length
1.	"Myself, Yourself Behind the Scenes" / "Bonus Multi-View Pole Dance""	27:16
Total length:		27:16

== Release history ==
Region	Date	Format(s)	Edition	Distributor
Various	October 19, 2013	Streaming; digital download	Standard	Mars
China	October 19, 2013	2DVD	Standard	GSM
Taiwan	October 19, 2013	2DVD	Standard	Warner
Taiwan	October 19, 2013	3DVD	Limited	Warner
