= Myself World Tour =

2010–2013 concert tour by Jolin Tsai

- World tour by Jolin Tsai
- Location: Asia; Europe; Oceania
- Associated album: Myself
- Start date: December 24, 2010
- End date: April 13, 2013
- Legs: 2
- No. of shows: 35
- Attendance: 600,000
- Box office: NT$1.5 billion

Jolin Tsai concert chronology
- Dancing Forever World Tour (2006–2009); Myself World Tour (2010–2013); Play World Tour (2015–2016)

The Myself World Tour (Chinese: Myself世界巡迴演唱會) was the third concert tour by Taiwanese singer Jolin Tsai. It began on December 24, 2010, at the Taipei Arena in Taipei, Taiwan, and concluded on April 13, 2013, at the Kaohsiung Arena in Kaohsiung, Taiwan. Spanning two years and four months, the tour covered 31 cities across Asia, Europe, and Oceania, with a total of 35 shows. It attracted approximately 600,000 attendees and grossed NT$1.5 billion in ticket sales.

== Background ==
On August 13, 2010, Tsai released her eleventh studio album, Myself. Later that month, on August 26, she revealed plans to launch a new concert tour around Christmas. On November 6, 210, Tsai officially announced that her third concert tour, the Myself World Tour, would begin on December 24 at the Taipei Arena in Taipei, Taiwan, with the theme of a "nationwide party".

== Commercial reception ==
Tickets for the Taipei dates of the tour went on sale at noon on November 6, 2010, and sold out within two days. As a result, an additional show was announced for December 26 in Taipei. On April 2, 2011, media reports revealed that all tickets for the June 24 Hong Kong show sold out on the day they became available, prompting the announcement of an extra performance on June 25, 2011. For the Kaohsiung dates, tickets went on sale at 1:00 PM on March 16, 2013, and sold out in just 18 minutes.

== Recording ==
On October 19, 2013, Tsai released the live video album Myself World Tour documenting performances from December 22 to 23, 2012, at the Taipei Arena in Taipei, Taiwan. The album was issued in two editions: the standard edition and the limited edition. The former includes 39 live performance tracks and the music video for the song "Journey". The latter features all content from the documentary edition, plus exclusive behind-the-scenes footage, a duo pole dance performance from the Kaohsiung show, and a specially re-filmed solo pole dance performance.

== Set list ==
December 24, 2010—August 25, 2012
1. "Butterfly"
2. "Pulchritude"
3. "Black-Haired Beautiful Girl"
4. "Vogue"
5. "Honey Trap"
6. "Parachute"
7. "Love Love Love"
8. "Love Player"
9. "36 Tricks of Love"
10. "Tacit Violence"
11. "Sky"
12. "Real Hurt"
13. "Agent J"
14. "Signature Gesture"
15. "Real Man"
16. "Overlooking Purposely"
17. "Rewind"
18. "Nothing Left to Say"
19. "I Know You're Feeling Blue"
20. "Do You Still Love Me"
21. "What Kind of Love"
22. "A Wonder in Madrid"
23. "Take Immediate Action"
24. "Party Star"
25. "Sun Will Never Set"
26. "Mr. Q"
27. "Dancing Diva"
28. "Butterflies in My Stomach"
29. "Music"
30. "Can't Get You Out of My Head"
31. "Just Dance"
32. "Dancing Forever"
33. "J-Game"
34. "Magic"
35. "Bravo Lover"
September 15, 2012—December 16, 2012
1. "The Great Artist"
2. "Pulchritude"
3. "Black-Haired Beautiful Girl"
4. "Dr. Jolin"
5. "Honey Trap"
6. "Wandering Poet"
7. "Love Love Love"
8. "Love Player"
9. "36 Tricks of Love"
10. "Tacit Violence"
11. "Sky"
12. "Real Hurt"
13. "Agent J"
14. "Signature Gesture"
15. "Real Man"
16. "Overlooking Purposely"
17. "Rewind"
18. "Nothing Left to Say"
19. "I Know You're Feeling Blue"
20. "Do You Still Love Me"
21. "What Kind of Love"
22. "I"
23. "A Wonder in Madrid"
24. "Say Love You"
25. "Sun Will Never Set"
26. "Mr. Q"
27. "Dancing Diva"
28. "Butterflies in My Stomach"
29. "Music"
30. "Can't Get You Out of My Head"
31. "Just Dance"
32. "Dancing Forever"
33. "J-Game"
34. "Magic"
35. "Bravo Lover"
December 22, 2012—April 13, 2013
1. "Honey Trap"
2. "Pulchritude"
3. "Black-Haired Beautiful Girl"
4. "Butterfly"
5. "The Great Artist"
6. "Mosaic"
7. "Love Love Love"
8. "36 Tricks of Love"
9. "Tacit Violence"
10. "Sky"
11. "Wandering Poet"
12. "Agent J"
13. "Beast"
14. "Love Player"
15. "Signature Gesture"
16. "Real Man"
17. "Overlooking Purposely"
18. "I Know You're Feeling Blue"
19. "Heart Breaking Day"
20. "The Prologue"
21. "Fall in Love with a Street"
22. "Can't Speak Clearly"
23. "The Smell of Lemon Grass"
24. "Compromise"
25. "Pretence"
26. "Rewind"
27. "Don't Stop"
28. "A Wonder in Madrid"
29. "Friday the 13th"
30. "Sun Will Never Set"
31. "Mr. Q"
32. "Butterflies in My Stomach"
33. "Dancing Diva"
34. "Fantasy"
35. "Dr. Jolin"
36. "Dancing Forever"
37. "I"
38. "J-Game"
39. "Magic"
40. "Bravo Lover"
Notes
- During the concerts from Shanghai to Macau, Tsai didn't perform "Party Star".
- During the first concert in Shanghai, Tsai performed "Nothing Left to Say" with Jay Chou, and Jay Chou performed "Common Jasmin Orange".
- During the first concert in Beijing, Tsai performed "Starry Mood", "Say Love You", and "Marry Me Today" with Jay Chou.
- During the first concert in Hong Kong, Tsai performed "Ambiguous" and the Cantonese version of "Pretence".
- During the second concert in Hong Kong, Tsai performed "Brink of Love and Pain" and the Cantonese version of "Pretence".
- During the second concert in Guangzhou, Tsai performed "Love Letter to Myself".
- During the fifth concert in Taipei, Tsai performed "Peter & Mary" and "Dare to Go to the Cemetery" with Ashin.
- During the concert in Kaohsiung, Tsai performed "Love Liar I Ask You", "Love Cha Cha", and "Dancing Girl".

== Shows ==
List of concert dates
| Date | City | Country | Venue | Attendance | Revenue |
Asia
| December 24, 2010 | Taipei | Taiwan | Taipei Arena | 30,000 | NT$75 million |
| December 25, 2010 | Taipei | Taiwan | Taipei Arena | 30,000 | NT$75 million |
| December 26, 2010 | Taipei | Taiwan | Taipei Arena | 30,000 | NT$75 million |
| May 7, 2011 | Singapore | | Singapore Indoor Stadium | 8,000 | Unknown |
| May 21, 2011 | Shanghai | China | Hongkou Football Stadium | 28,000 | Unknown |
| May 28, 2011 | Beijing | China | Workers' Stadium | 40,000 | Unknown |
| June 11, 2011 | Kuala Lumpur | Malaysia | Stadium Merdeka | 13,000 | Unknown |
| June 24, 2011 | Hong Kong | China | Hong Kong Coliseum | Unknown | Unknown |
| June 25, 2011 | Hong Kong | China | Hong Kong Coliseum | Unknown | Unknown |
| July 2, 2011 | Guangzhou | China | Guangzhou Gymnasium | Unknown | Unknown |
| July 16, 2011 | Changzhou | China | Changzhou Olympic Sports Center Stadium | 30,000 | Unknown |
| August 26, 2011 | Jiangyin | China | Jiangyin Sports Center Stadium | Unknown | Unknown |
| September 9, 2011 | Tianjin | China | Tianjin Olympic Center Stadium | Unknown | Unknown |
| September 17, 2011 | Nanjing | China | Nanjing Olympic Sports Centre Stadium | Unknown | Unknown |
| April 20, 2012 | Wenzhou | China | Wenzhou Sports Centre Stadium | 20,000 | Unknown |
| July 14, 2012 | Shanghai | China | Mercedes-Benz Arena | Unknown | Unknown |
| August 25, 2012 | Macau | China | Cotai Arena | Unknown | Unknown |
| September 15, 2012 | Beijing | China | Workers Indoor Arena | Unknown | Unknown |
| September 22, 2012 | Foshan | China | Foshan Lingnan Mingzhu Gymnasium | Unknown | Unknown |
Europe
| October 21, 2012 | London | United Kingdom | Wembley Arena | 7,000 | Unknown |
Asia
| October 27, 2012 | Quanzhou | China | Straits Sports Centre Arena | Unknown | Unknown |
| November 3, 2012 | Shenzhen | China | Shenzhen Bay Sports Centre Arena | Unknown | Unknown |
| November 16, 2012 | Pahang | Malaysia | Arena of Stars | Unknown | Unknown |
| November 24, 2012 | Fuzhou | China | Fujian Provincial Sports Centre Stadium | Unknown | Unknown |
| December 8, 2012 | Chengdu | China | Sichuan Gymnasium | Unknown | Unknown |
| December 16, 2012 | Guangzhou | China | Guangzhou International Sports Arena | 18,000 | Unknown |
| December 22, 2012 | Taipei | Taiwan | Taipei Arena | 30,000 | NT$60 million |
| December 23, 2012 | Taipei | Taiwan | Taipei Arena | 30,000 | NT$60 million |
| December 29, 2012 | Kunming | China | Xinyazhou Sports Center Arena | Unknown | Unknown |
| January 5, 2013 | Yangzhou | China | Yangzhou Sports Center Arena | Unknown | Unknown |
Oceania
| February 19, 2013 | Sydney | Australia | The Star Event Centre | Unknown | Unknown |
Asia
| March 9, 2013 | Chengdu | China | Sichuan Gymnasium | Unknown | Unknown |
| March 23, 2013 | Nanning | China | Guangxi Sports Center Arena | Unknown | Unknown |
| March 30, 2013 | Yibin | China | Yibin Sports Center Stadium | 15,000 | Unknown |
| April 13, 2013 | Kaohsiung | Taiwan | Kaohsiung Arena | 12,000 | Unknown |
| Total | | | | 600,000 | NT$1.5 billion |

=== Cancelled dates ===
List of cancelled dates
| Date | City | Country | Venue | Reason |
|---|---|---|---|---|
| December 1, 2012 | Tianjin | China | Tianjin Sports Center | Unknown |
| March 23, 2013 (Note: It was originally scheduled to be held on November 10, 2012, but was postponed for unknown reason, and then canceled for unknown reason.) | Wuhan | China | Hongshan Gymnasium | Unknown |
