= Play World Tour =

2015–2016 concert tour by Jolin Tsai

- World tour by Jolin Tsai
- Location: Asia; North America
- Associated album: Play
- Start date: May 22, 2015
- End date: July 16, 2016
- No. of shows: 34
- Attendance: 600,000
- Box office: NT$1.5 billion

Jolin Tsai concert chronology
- Myself World Tour (2010–2013); Play World Tour (2015–2016); Ugly Beauty World Tour (2019–2024)

The Play World Tour (Chinese: Play世界巡迴演唱會) was the fourth concert tour by Taiwanese singer Jolin Tsai. It began on May 22, 2015, at the Taipei Arena in Taipei, Taiwan, and concluded on July 16, 2016, at the Stadium Merdeka in Kuala Lumpur, Malaysia. Spanning one year and two months, the tour covered 23 cities across Asia and North America, with a total of 34 shows. It attracted approximately 600,000 attendees and grossed NT$1.5 billion in ticket sales.

== Background and development ==
On October 29, 2014, Tsai revealed that she would begin planning a new tour following the release of her album Play, emphasizing that the upcoming tour would place a stronger focus on music. On February 15, 2015, she officially announced that the Play World Tour would kick off on May 22 at the Taipei Arena in Taipei, Taiwan. On February 29, 2015, Tsai traveled to Los Angeles for two weeks of dance rehearsals and joined her full production team in early preparations for the tour. Media sources reported that she and her dancers would conduct final rehearsals on a temporary stage in Taiwan during the two weeks leading up to the tour's launch.

On February 31, 2015, Tsai released the official tour poster, photographed by Chen Man, with acclaimed stylist Wyman Wong serving as style consultant. She also revealed that the tour would be produced in collaboration with global entertainment company Live Nation and co-directed by renowned choreographers Travis Payne and Stacy Walker.

According to media reports, the production budget for the tour exceeded NT$100 million. The stage hardware team was sourced globally, and Tsai collaborated with Jet Tone Films to produce five interlude videos. Additionally, Live Nation held three rounds of dancer auditions in Los Angeles, ultimately selecting 12 dancers for the tour. A total of 14 choreographers were invited to create choreography for the tour's musical performances. On June 1, 2015, Tsai held a press conference in Beijing to announce that the tour would also include dates in Mainland China.

== Commercial reception ==
Tickets for the Taipei dates of the tour went on sale at 12:00 PM on April 12, 2015. All 33,000 tickets sold out within just 18 minutes. In response to overwhelming demand, an additional show on May 25 was announced. Tickets for that show went on sale at noon on April 15 and the 11,000 available seats were snapped up in just 6 minutes. On May 24, 2015, Tsai announced two more shows to be held on November 7 and 8 in Taipei. Tickets for these dates were released at 1:30 PM on June 13, and all 22,000 tickets sold out in 17 minutes. Due to continued demand, another show was added for November 6, announced on August 15. Then, on August 28, 2015, yet another show for November 5 was announced. Tickets for both the November 5 and 6 performances went on sale at 11:00 AM on September 5, with all 22,000 tickets selling out in just 13 minutes.

== Critical reception ==
Media personality Kevin Lee praised the concert as exceeding all expectations. From the program content, costumes and styling, to vocal performance, dance skills, and stage design, everything met—and even surpassed—international standards. He noted that Tsai's performance shattered the conventional belief that "a performer who dances well can't sing", showcasing her as a truly versatile artist. Her ability to both sing and dance impressively stood out, particularly during the operatic segment, which left him in awe.

Shau, a columnist for PlayMusic, remarked that Tsai not only demonstrated outstanding vocal abilities but also exuded a more relaxed and magnetic stage presence. On stage, she appeared fearless—at times playful, at times bold. Tsai has become a defining figure in many people's youth, and her allure continues to captivate an ever-growing audience.

Lin Cheng-ping, a reporter for ETtoday, observed that Tsai deliberately moved away from the high-risk stunts featured in her past concert tours, instead focusing on refined dance training and a complete rearrangement of all her songs. He emphasized that Tsai clearly understands that even without acrobatic feats, she can still radiate artistic brilliance on stage.

According to BeautiMode, compared to her previous Myself World Tour and Dancing Forever World Tour, Tsai's performance this time felt more natural and carried an undeniable superstar aura. As the white curtain fell and she appeared in a Medusa-inspired look, her voice and movements immediately captivated the entire audience.

== Recording ==
On January 30, 2018, Tsai released the live video album Play World Tour, which features performances from her concerts held at the Taipei Arena in Taiwan from May 22 to 25, 2015. The release also includes four short documentary films from the We're All Different, Yet the Same series, directed by Hou Chi-jan and Gavin Lin, along with a behind-the-scenes video of the tour. The album was directed by Leo Hsu and post-produced by 3 Aqua Entertainment. According to Warner, the production utilized 26 ground and aerial cameras, and the final edit was crafted from over 400 hours of footage. Tsai personally oversaw the post-production process on three separate occasions.

== Set list ==
1. "Medusa"
2. "Real Man"
3. "Honey Trap"
4. "Bravo Lover"
5. "I'm Not Yours"
6. "Agent J"
7. "Butterfly"
8. "Love Love Love"
9. "Prague Square"
10. "I Love, I Embrace"
11. "Exclusive Myth"
12. "The Great Artist"
13. "Mr. Q"
14. "Rewind"
15. "The Smell of Lemon Grass"
16. "I Know You're Feeling Blue"
17. "Sky"
18. "Butterflies in My Stomach"
19. "Miss Trouble"
20. "Queen of the Night Aria"
21. "Sun Will Never Set"
22. "Nothing Left to Say"
23. "You Gotta Know"
24. "J-Game"
25. "Fantasy"
26. "36 Tricks of Love"
27. "Phony Queen"
28. "Dr. Jolin"
29. "Dancing Diva"
30. "Magic"
31. "We're All Different, Yet the Same"
32. "Out on the Street"
33. "The Spirit of Knight"
34. "Play"
Notes
- Since the second concert in Taipei, Tsai performed "The Third Person and I", but didn't perform "I Love, I Embrace".
- During the second concert in Taipei, Tsai performed "The Smell of Lemon Grass", "Lucky Number", and "Don't Stop", but didn't perform "Rewind".
- During the third concert in Taipei, Tsai performed "Mosaic", "Blame It on the Age", "Alone", "Pretence", and "Marry Me Today".
- During the fourth concert in Taipei, Tsai performed "I'm Not Yours" with Namie Amuro, Tsai performed "The Smell of Lemon Grass", "Mosaic", "Blame It on the Age", "Alone", "Good-Bye", "Overlooking Purposely", "Say Love You", and "Don't Stop".
- During the concert in Guangzhou, Tsai performed "The Smell of Lemon Grass", "Missing You", "Accompany with Me", and the Cantonese version of "Pretence", but didn't perform "Out on the Street".
- During the first concert in Beijing, Tsai performed "The Smell of Lemon Grass", "Love in the Shape of Heart", "Priceless", "Good-Bye", "Because of You", and "A Wonder in Madrid".
- During the first concert in Shanghai, Tsai performed "The Smell of Lemon Grass", "Greek Girl by the Wishing Pond", "Fall in Love with a Street", "Can't Speak Clearly", and "Say Love You", but didn't perform "The Spirit of Knight".
- During the concert in Singapore, Tsai performed "The Smell of Lemon Grass", "Encounter", "Living with the World", "Can't Speak Clearly", "The Prologue", "The Finale", and "Take Immediate Action", but didn't perform "Lip Reading", "Out on the Street", or "The Spirit of Knight".
- During the concert in Changsha, Tsai performed "The Smell of Lemon Grass", "Color Photos", "Because of You", and "Say Love You", but didn't perform "Lip Reading" or "Out on the Street".
- During the concert in Tianjin, Tsai performed "The Smell of Lemon Grass", "I Am What I Am", "Living with the World", "Heard That Love's Ever Been Back", "Be You for a Day", and "Say Love You", but didn't perform "Lip Reading" or "Out on the Street".
- During the concert in Chongqing, Tsai performed "The Smell of Lemon Grass", "Moonlight in the City", "The Moon Represents My Heart", "Single Harm", and "Say Love You", but didn't perform "Lip Reading", "Out on the Street", or "The Spirit of Knight".
- During the concert in Hohhot, Tsai performed "Are You Happy", "Say Love You", "Don't Stop", and "Pretence", but didn't perform "Lip Reading" or "Out on the Street".
- During the concert in Dalian, Tsai performed "The Smell of Lemon Grass", "Color Photos", "Kaleidoscope", and "Say Love You", but didn't perform "Lip Reading", "You Gotta Know", or "Out on the Street".
- During the fifth concert in Taipei, Tsai performed "Devotion", "Fragrance of Roses", "Evening Primrose", "Heard That Love's Ever Been Back", "Good Thing", "Hot Winter", and "Say Love You", and Tsai performed "We're all Different, Yet the Same" with Sandy Lam, but didn't perform "Lip Reading", "Out on the Street", or "The Spirit of Knight".
- During the sixth concert in Taipei, Tsai performed "The Smell of Lemon Grass", "The Phantom of the Opera", "Priceless", "Feel You Presence", "Pretence", "Black-Haired Beautiful Girl", and "Say Love You", but didn't perform "Rewind", "Lip Reading", "Queen of the Night Aria", "Out on the Street", or "The Spirit of Knight".
- During the seventh concert in Taipei, Tsai performed "The Phantom of the Opera", "Overlooking Purposely", "Fake Confess", "Marry Me Today", "Pretty Pretty Day", and "Say Love You", but didn't perform "Lip Reading", "Queen of the Night Aria", "Out on the Street", or "The Spirit of Knight".
- During the eighth concert in Taipei, Tsai performed "Viva Love" and "The Great Artist" with Mayday, Tsai performed "The Smell of Lemon Grass", "The Phantom of the Opera", "Disappearing Castle", "Under the Sea", "Attraction of Sexy Lips", and "Say Love You", but didn't perform "Rewind", "Out on the Street", or "The Spirit of Knight".
- During the concert in Hangzhou, Tsai performed "The Smell of Lemon Grass", "Habitual Betrayal", "Marry Me Today", "Can't Speak Clearly", "Do You Still Love Me", and "Say Love You", but didn't perform "Lip Reading", "Queen of the Night Aria", "Out on the Street", or "The Spirit of Knight".
- During the concert in Nanjing, Tsai performed "The Smell of Lemon Grass", "The Phantom of the Opera", "Greek Girl by the Wishing Pond", "Reluctant", "Fake Confess", and "Say Love You", but didn't perform "Lip Reading", "Queen of the Night Aria", "Out on the Street", or "The Spirit of Knight".
- During the concert in Fuzhou, Tsai performed "The Smell of Lemon Grass", "Disappearing Castle", "Love in the Shape of Heart", "Love Is Near", and "Say Love You", but didn't perform "Lip Reading", "Queen of the Night Aria", "Out on the Street", or "The Spirit of Knight".
- During the first concert in Hong Kong, Tsai performed "Wedding Invitation Street", "The Phantom of the Opera", "Accompany with Me", the Cantonese version of "Pretence", and "Say Love You", but didn't perform "Lip Reading", "Queen of the Night Aria", or "The Spirit of Knight".
- During the second concert in Hong Kong, Tsai performed "Wedding Invitation Street", "Do You Still Love Me", "Singlehood Plague", "Priceless", and "Say Love You", but didn't perform "Lip Reading" or "Out on the Street".
- During the first concert in Atlantic City, Tsai performed "Heard That Love's Ever Been Back".
- During the second concert in Atlantic City, Tsai performed "Wedding Invitation Street".
- During the concert in Hefei, Tsai performed "The Phantom of the Opera", "Love in the Shape of Heart", "Kaleidoscope", "Alone", and "Say Love You", but didn't perform "Lip Reading", "Queen of the Night Aria", "Out on the Street", or "The Spirit of Knight".
- During the concert in Shenzhen, Tsai performed "The Smell of Lemon Grass", "Mosaic", "Missing You", "Heard That Love's Ever Been Back", and "Black-Haired Beautiful Girl", but didn't perform "Lip Reading", "Out on the Street", or "The Spirit of Knight".
- During the concert in Wuhan, Tsai performed "The Prologue", "Fall in Love with a Street", "My Choice", "The Finale", and "Say Love You", but didn't perform "Lip Reading", "Out on the Street", or "The Spirit of Knight".
- During the concert in Macau, Tsai performed "Brink of Love and Pain", "Marry Me Today", "The Smell of Lemon Grass", "Be You for a Day", and "Say Love You", but didn't perform "Lip Reading", "Out on the Street", or "The Spirit of Knight".
- During the second concert in Beijing, Tsai performed "Disappearing Castle", "Love in the Shape of Heart", and "Say Love You", but didn't perform "Lip Reading", "Out on the Street", or "The Spirit of Knight".
- During the second concert in Shanghai, Tsai performed "Agent J" with Chris Lee, Tsai performed "The Smell of Lemon Grass", "Priceless", "A Wonder in Madrid", and "Say Love You", but didn't perform "Lip Reading", "Out on the Street", or "The Spirit of Knight".
- During the concert in Zhengzhou, Tsai performed "Little Child", "The Phantom of the Opera", "Manual of Youth", "I Am What I Am", "Take Immediate Action", "Marry Me Today", "Feel Your Presence", and "Say Love You", but didn't perform "Lip Reading", "Queen of the Night Aria", "Out on the Street", or "The Spirit of Knight".
- During the concert in Chengdu, Tsai performed "Little Child", "Are You Happy", "I Am What I Am", "Can't Speak Clearly", "Disappearing Castle", and "Say Love You", but didn't perform "Lip Reading", "Out on the Street", or "The Spirit of Knight".
- During the concert in Taiyuan, Tsai performed "A Little Happiness", "Under the Sea", "Wandering Poet", "Living with the World", "Are You Happy", and "Say Love You", but didn't perform "Lip Reading", "Out on the Street", or "The Spirit of Knight".
- During the concert in Kuala Lumpur, Tsai performed "Little Love Song", "Journey", "Pretty Pretty Day", "Don't Stop", "Fake Confess", and "A Wonder in Madrid", but didn't perform "Lip Reading", "Out on the Street", or "The Spirit of Knight".

== Shows ==
List of concert dates
| Date | City | Country | Venue | Attendance | Revenue |
Asia
| May 22, 2015 | Taipei | Taiwan | Taipei Arena | 44,000 | NT$120 million |
| May 23, 2015 | Taipei | Taiwan | Taipei Arena | 44,000 | NT$120 million |
| May 24, 2015 | Taipei | Taiwan | Taipei Arena | 44,000 | NT$120 million |
| May 25, 2015 | Taipei | Taiwan | Taipei Arena | 44,000 | NT$120 million |
| July 4, 2015 | Guangzhou | China | Guangzhou International Sports Arena | Unknown | Unknown |
| July 11, 2015 | Beijing | China | Capital Indoor Stadium | Unknown | Unknown |
| July 18, 2015 | Shanghai | China | Mercedes-Benz Arena | Unknown | Unknown |
| July 25, 2015 | Singapore | | Singapore Indoor Stadium | Unknown | Unknown |
| September 4, 2015 | Changsha | China | Hunan International Convention & Exhibition Centre | Unknown | Unknown |
| September 19, 2015 | Tianjin | China | Tianjin Arena | Unknown | Unknown |
| September 26, 2015 | Chongqing | China | Chongqing International Convention & Exhibition Center | Unknown | Unknown |
| October 10, 2015 | Hohhot | China | Inner Mongolia Arena | Unknown | Unknown |
| October 24, 2015 | Dalian | China | Zhongsheng Center | Unknown | Unknown |
| November 5, 2015 | Taipei | Taiwan | Taipei Arena | 44,000 | NT$120 million |
| November 6, 2015 | Taipei | Taiwan | Taipei Arena | 44,000 | NT$120 million |
| November 7, 2015 | Taipei | Taiwan | Taipei Arena | 44,000 | NT$120 million |
| November 8, 2015 | Taipei | Taiwan | Taipei Arena | 44,000 | NT$120 million |
| November 11, 2015 | Hangzhou | China | Yellow Dragon Sports Center | Unknown | Unknown |
| November 28, 2015 | Nanjing | China | Nanjing Olympic Sports Center Gymnasium | Unknown | Unknown |
| December 5, 2015 | Fuzhou | China | Straits Sports Centre Arena | Unknown | Unknown |
| December 11, 2015 | Hong Kong | China | Hong Kong Coliseum | Unknown | Unknown |
| December 12, 2015 | Hong Kong | China | Hong Kong Coliseum | Unknown | Unknown |
North America
| March 26, 2016 | Atlantic City | United States | Borgata Casino Event Center | Unknown | Unknown |
| March 27, 2016 | Atlantic City | United States | Borgata Casino Event Center | Unknown | Unknown |
Asia
| April 2, 2016 | Hefei | China | Binhu International Convention and Exhibition Center | Unknown | Unknown |
| April 16, 2016 | Shenzhen | China | Shenzhen Bay Sports Centre Arena | Unknown | Unknown |
| April 23, 2016 | Wuhan | China | Hongshan Arena | Unknown | Unknown |
| April 30, 2016 | Macau | China | Cotai Arena | Unknown | Unknown |
| May 14, 2016 | Beijing | China | LeSports Center | Unknown | Unknown |
| May 21, 2016 | Shanghai | China | Mercedes-Benz Arena | Unknown | Unknown |
| June 11, 2016 (Note: It was originally scheduled to be held on December 19, 2015, but was postponed due to venue requisition.) | Zhengzhou | China | Zhengzhou International Convention and Exhibition Centre | Unknown | Unknown |
| June 18, 2016 | Chengdu | China | Sichuan Gymnasium | Unknown | Unknown |
| July 2, 2016 (Note: It was originally scheduled to be held on June 25, 2016, but was postponed due to schedule conflict.) | Taiyuan | China | Shanxi Gymnasium | Unknown | Unknown |
| July 16, 2016 | Kuala Lumpur | Malaysia | Stadium Merdeka | Unknown | Unknown |
| Total | | | | 600,000 | NT$1.5 billion |

=== Cancelled dates ===
List of cancelled dates
| Date | City | Country | Venue | Reason |
|---|---|---|---|---|
| October 31, 2015 | Nanning | China | Guangxi Sports Center Arena | Stage collapse |
