= If You Think You Can, You Can! =

2007 live video album by Jolin Tsai

Live album by Jolin Tsai
- Released: June 8, 2007
- Recorded: November 17–19, 2006
- Venue: Taipei Arena (Taipei, Taiwan)
- Genre: Pop
- Length: 1:51:19
- Label: EMI

Jolin Tsai chronology
Favorite (2006)	If You Think You Can, You Can! (2007)	Final Wonderland (2007)

If You Think You Can, You Can! (Chinese: 地才) is a live video album by Taiwanese singer Jolin Tsai, released by EMI on June 8, 2007. The album features selected live performances from her Dancing Forever World Tour held at the Taipei Arena from November 17 to 19, 2006, along with a tour documentary and four music videos. The album sold over 120,000 copies in Taiwan and was the best-selling video album of 2007 on Five Music's annual sales chart.

== Background and release ==
On September 15, 2006, Tsai kicked off the second leg of her Dancing Forever World Tour at the Hong Kong Coliseum. On May 14, 2007, EMI announced that the live video album of the tour would be available for pre-order starting May 25, with an official release date set for June 8. On June 11, 2007, Tsai held a promotional event for the album at the Taipei Arena.

== Title ==
The album title was inspired by a review from the China Times following Tsai's concert at the Hong Kong Coliseum. The newspaper stated, "Jolin Tsai is a self-made talent, unlike geniuses such as Faye Wong or Jay Chou. Everything she has achieved has been earned step by step through hard work. Like many of us, she simply hopes that diligent effort will yield results. What sets her apart is that she works many times harder than the rest of us." Tsai explained, "Some geniuses lose their brilliance midway due to pride and complacency, while self-made talents are willing to exhaust all their energy and work tirelessly to stand out and become legendary. It turns out that with perseverance, there is no difference between a genius and a self-made talent."

== Commercial performance ==
On June 13, 2007, EMI announced that the album had sold over 100,000 copies in Taiwan during its first week of release. It topped the weekly sales charts for video albums on both G-Music and Five Music in Taiwan. Furthermore, the album ranked second and first, respectively, on the 2007 annual video album sales charts of G-Music and Five Music.

== Track listing ==
DVD
No.	Title	Lyrics	Music	Length
1.	"Pulchritude"	Luke Tsui	Lars Quang; Thea Winkelmann	3:27
2.	"Mr. Q"	Issac Chen	Miriam Nervo; Olivia Nervo; Ben Thomas; Dele Ladimeji	4:13
3.	"The Prologue"	Jolin Tsai	Xiao Yu	4:20
4.	"Pretence"	Howard Chiang	Howard Ku	4:54
5.	"Dancing Forever"	Issac Chen	Roger Olsson; Klas Johan Wahl; Nick Whitecross	4:00
6.	"Attraction of Sexy Lips"	Sunny Lee	Terry Lee	3:17
7.	"A Wonder in Madrid"	Alang Huang	Hagen Troy	5:26
8.	"Missing"	Wyman Wong	Simon Raymonde; Elizabeth Fraser; Robin Guthrie	3:36
9.	"Dancing Diva"	Issac Chen	Miriam Nervo; Olivia Nervo; Greg Kurstin	3:56
Total length:				37:09

DVD: Chapters
No.	Title	Length
1.	"Just Need More Time"	19:32
2.	"One and Lonely"	19:53
3.	"Let's Dance"	17:26
4.	"Impossible Is Possible"	18:55
5.	"Never Give Up"	18:22
Total length:		94:08

DVD: Special Features
No.	Title	Length
1.	"Dancing Forever" (music video)	4:12
2.	"Heard That Love's Ever Been Back" (music video)	5:07
3.	"Dare to Go to the Cemetery" (music video)	4:14
4.	"Missing" (music video)	3:38
Total length:		17:11

== Release history ==
Region	Date	Format(s)	Distributor
Various	June 8, 2007	Streaming	EMI
Taiwan	June 8, 2007	DVD	EMI
China	February 17, 2008	DVD	Push Typhoon
