= List of Jolin Tsai concerts =

Jolin Tsai concerts
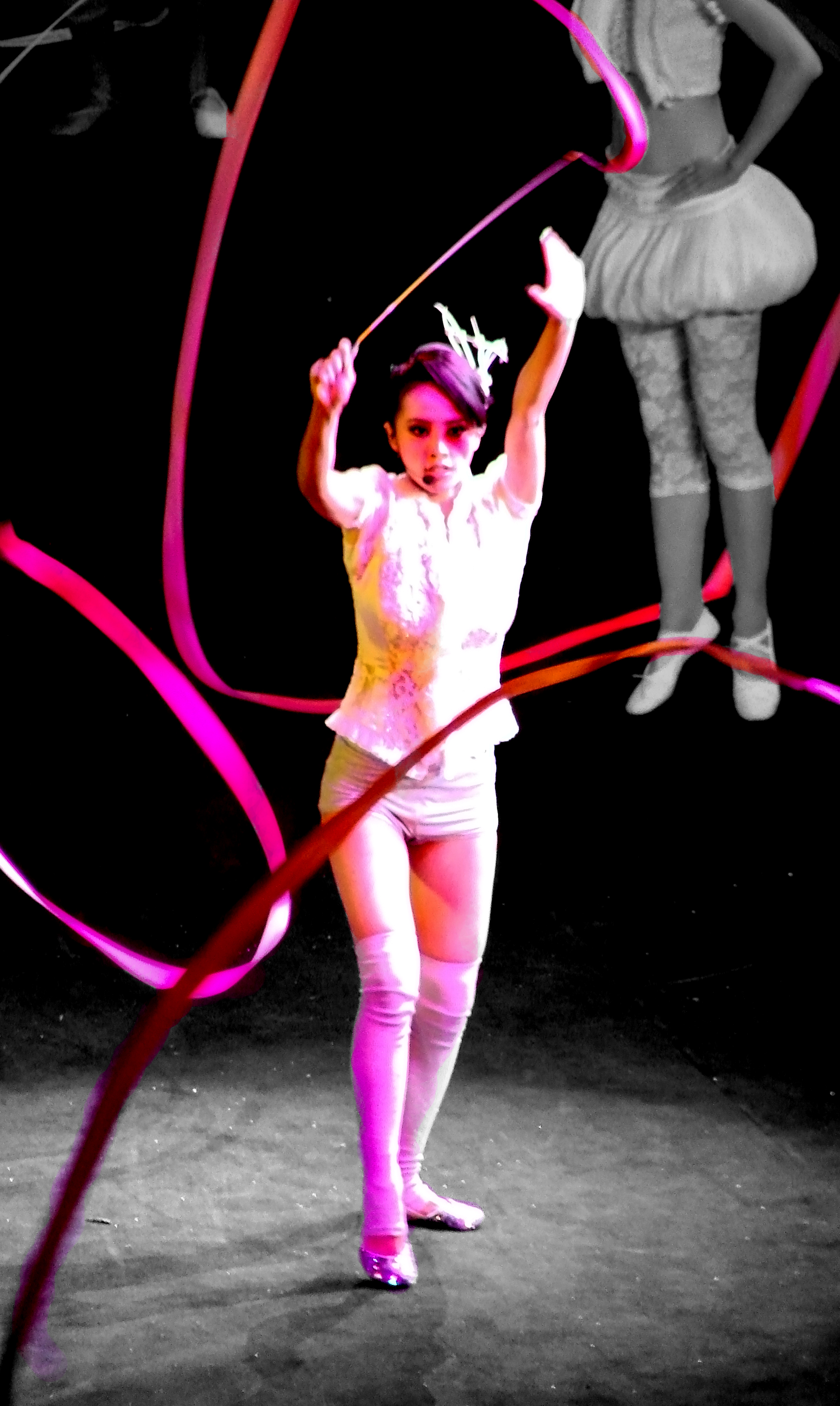
- Tsai performing during the Dancing Forever World Tour in Singapore, April 2007
- Concert tours: 6
- One-off concerts: 21

Taiwanese singer Jolin Tsai has held a total of five major concert tours (comprising 168 concerts) and 21 one-off concerts to date. In 1999, she held her first one-off concert, the 1019 I Can Concert, in Taipei, Taiwan. In 2004, she launched her first concert tour, the J1 World Tour, which spanned one year and nine months, with eight performances in seven cities in Asia and North America. In 2006, Tsai embarked on her second concert tour, the Dancing Forever World Tour, which lasted two and a half years and included 28 shows across 20 cities in Asia, Oceania, and North America, attracting approximately 500,000 attendees and generating a box office revenue of around NT$1 billion.

Her third world tour, the Myself World Tour, began in 2010 and lasted two years and four months. It covered 31 cities in Asia, Europe, and Oceania, with 35 performances, drawing around 600,000 fans and grossing approximately NT$1.5 billion in ticket sales. In 2015, Tsai kicked off her fourth world tour, the Play World Tour, which lasted one year and two months. The tour included 34 performances across 23 cities in Asia and North America, attracting around 600,000 attendees and earning NT$1.5 billion in box office revenue. Her fifth world tour, the Ugly Beauty World Tour, began in 2019 and ran for four years and seven months, with 63 performances across 27 cities in Asia. In 2025, she embarked her sixth world tour, Pleasure World Tour.

== Concert tours ==
Title	Date	Associated album(s)	Continent(s)	Shows	Gross	Attendance	Ref.
J1 World Tour	August 7, 2004 – April 22, 2006	Magic; Castle	Asia; North America	8	Unknown	Unknown	
Dancing Forever World Tour	September 15, 2006 – February 8, 2009	Dancing Diva	Asia; Oceania; North America	28	NT$1 billion	500,000	
Myself World Tour	December 24, 2010 – April 13, 2013	Myself	Asia; Europe; Oceania	35	NT$1.5 billion	600,000	
Play World Tour	May 22, 2015 – July 16, 2016	Play	Asia; North America	34	NT$1.5 billion	600,000	
Ugly Beauty World Tour	December 30, 2019 – August 18, 2024	Ugly Beauty	Asia	63	Unknown	Unknown	
Pleasure World Tour	December 30, 2025 –	Pleasure	Asia	—N/a	Unknown	Unknown	

== One-off concerts ==
Date	Title	City	Country	Venue	Ref.
December 4, 1999	1019 I Can Concert	Taipei	Taiwan	Nankang 101	
April 16, 2000	Don't Stop Concert	Taichung	Taiwan	Fulfillment Amphitheater Planned Site	
July 10, 2000	Examinee Night Concert	Taipei	Taiwan	Chiang Kai-shek Memorial Hall	
February 25, 2001	Show Your Love Concert	Panchiao	Taiwan	Panchiao First Stadium	
March 4, 2001	Show Your Love Concert	Taichung	Taiwan	Fulfillment Amphitheater Planned Site	
July 21, 2001	Lucky Number Concert	Taipei	Taiwan	Nankang 101	
May 18, 2002	Brand New Jolin Concert	Hsinchuang	Taiwan	Hsinchuang Gymnasium	
April 12, 2003	Say Love You Concert	Tainan	Taiwan	Tainan City Government West Square	
August 29, 2003	Magic Concert	Las Vegas	United States	Mandalay Bay Events Center	
April 17, 2004	It's Love Concert	Taipei	Taiwan	Shin Kong Mitsukoshi's Taipei Hsinyi Place Square	
June 18, 2005	Exclusive Asia Concert	Taichung	Taiwan	Taichung Metropolitan Opera House Planned Site	
July 1, 2006	Pulchritude Concert	Kaohsiung	Taiwan	Kaohsiung Cultural Center	
October 21, 2007	Agent J Concert	Tamsui	Taiwan	Tamsui Fisherman's Wharf	
March 28, 2009	Butterfly Campus Tour	Hsinchu	Taiwan	Chung Hua University Playground	
April 11, 2009	Butterfly Campus Tour	Taichung	Taiwan	National Taichung Second Senior High School Playground	
April 19, 2009	Butterfly Campus Tour	Taichung	Taiwan	National Taichung University of Science and Technology Playground	
May 9, 2009	Butterfly Concert	Taichung	Taiwan	Taichung Citizen Square	
May 10, 2009	Butterfly Campus Tour	Tainan	Taiwan	Southern Taiwan University of Science and Technology Playground	
May 24, 2009	Slow Life Concert	Taipei	Taiwan	Riverside Music Cafe	
October 6, 2012	Muse Concert	Tainan	Taiwan	Anyi Parking Lot	
December 7, 2014	Play Concert	Taipei	Taiwan	Songshan Cultural and Creative Park	
