= Dancing Forever World Tour =

2006–2009 concert tour by Jolin Tsai

- World tour by Jolin Tsai
- Location: Asia; Oceania; North America
- Associated album: Dancing Diva
- Start date: September 15, 2006
- End date: February 8, 2009
- Legs: 2
- No. of shows: 28
- Attendance: 500,000
- Box office: NT$1 billion

Jolin Tsai concert chronology
- J1 World Tour (2004–2006); Dancing Forever World Tour (2006–2009); Myself World Tour (2010–2013)

The Dancing Forever World Tour (Chinese: 唯舞獨尊世界巡迴演唱會) was the second concert tour by Taiwanese singer Jolin Tsai. It began on September 15, 2006, at the Hong Kong Coliseum and concluded on February 8, 2009, at the Mohegan Sun Arena in Uncasville, United States. Spanning two and a half years, the tour covered 20 cities across Asia, Oceania, and North America, with a total of 28 shows. It attracted approximately 500,000 attendees and grossed NT$1 billion in ticket sales.

== Background ==
On May 12, 2006, Tsai released her eighth studio album, Dancing Diva. Later that month, on May 31, her manager, Howard Chiang, revealed that she was planning to launch a new concert tour in the second half of the year. On July 17, 2006, Tsai officially announced that her second concert tour, the Dancing Forever World Tour, would kick off on September 15 at the Hong Kong Coliseum.

== Commercial reception ==
Tickets for the Shanghai date of the tour went on sale at 9:00 AM on August 1, 2006, breaking the venue's first-day sales record at Hongkou Football Stadium. Within the first week, ticket sales surpassed RMB 1.5 million. The Taipei dates opened for ticket sales at 12:30 AM on September 18, selling out all 22,000 tickets within six days. Following this success, an additional show was announced for November 17, 2006, making Tsai the first pop artist to hold three consecutive concerts at the Taipei Arena. Tickets for the November 17 Taipei show, totaling 11,000, were sold out by October 21, 2006.

== Controversies ==
The choreography during the tour featured moves that were both more challenging and riskier than those of most artists, incorporating gymnastic elements such as rings and pommel horse techniques. However, some audience members voiced concerns, arguing that Tsai's concerts resembled "circus performances" and had lost the true essence of a concert. In response, Tsai stated, "Many of my songs are originally dance tracks, and pairing them with choreography allows for a more complete expression. These advanced gymnastic moves only enhance the show—I do not believe they compromise the integrity of the concert. After all, every artist has their own unique performance style."

== Recording ==
On June 8, 2007, Tsai released the live video album and documentary titled If You Think You Can, You Can!. The album features selected live performances from the tour's November 17–19, 2006 shows at the Taipei Arena in Taipei, Taiwan, along with a documentary and four music videos from her album Dancing Forever (2006).

== Set list ==
September 15, 2006—October 13, 2006
1. "Pulchritude"
2. "Attraction of Sexy Lips"
3. "Signature Gesture"
4. "Paradise"
5. "Prague Square"
6. "Greek Girl by the Wishing Pond"
7. "Fake Confess"
8. "Sky"
9. "The Smell of Lemon Grass"
10. "Pretence"
11. "A Wonder in Madrid"
12. "It's Love"
13. "Say Love You"
14. "Prove It"
15. "Mr. Q"
16. "Overlooking Purposely"
17. "Rope on Vest"
18. "The Starter"
19. "Repeated Note"
20. "The Prologue"
21. "Heard That Love's Ever Been Back"
22. "Dancing Forever"
23. "J-Game"
24. "36 Tricks of Love"
25. "Magic"
26. "Dancing Diva"
27. "Rewind"
November 17, 2006—April 7, 2007
1. "Pulchritude"
2. "Signature Gesture"
3. "Mr. Q"
4. "Paradise"
5. "Exclusive Myth"
6. "Greek Girl by the Wishing Pond"
7. "Missing"
8. "Fake Confess"
9. "The Smell of Lemon Grass"
10. "A Wonder in Madrid"
11. "It's Love"
12. "Say Love You"
13. "Prove It"
14. "Attraction of Sexy Lips"
15. "Overlooking Purposely"
16. "The Prologue"
17. "Pretence"
18. "Sky"
19. "Dancing Forever"
20. "J-Game"
21. "36 Tricks of Love"
22. "Magic"
23. "Dancing Diva"
24. "Rewind"
December 14, 2007—February 8, 2009
1. "Pulchritude"
2. "Signature Gesture"
3. "Mr. Q"
4. "Paradise"
5. "Greek Girl by the Wishing Pond"
6. "Prove It"
7. "Alone"
8. "The Smell of Lemon Grass"
9. "Missing"
10. "A Wonder in Madrid"
11. "Sun Will Never Set"
12. "Agent J"
13. "Attraction of Sexy Lips"
14. "Overlooking Purposely"
15. "Fake Confess"
16. "Pretence"
17. "Sky"
18. "Dancing Forever"
19. "J-Game"
20. "36 Tricks of Love"
21. "Bravo Lover"
22. "Magic"
23. "Dancing Diva"
24. "Rewind"
Notes
- During the first concert in Hong Kong, Eason Chan performed "Lonely Christmas" and "Brother and Sister", Rainie Yang performed "Song of Birthday Greeting", "Ambiguous", and "Meeting Love", and Tsai performed "Nice Guy" with Stanley Huang.
- During the second concert in Hong Kong, Show Lo performed "Love Expert" and "Chance Chance", Tsai performed the Cantonese version of "Pretence", Tsai performed "Cloudy Day" with Stefanie Sun, and Stefanie Sun performed "I Am Fine".
- During the concert in Shanghai, Show Lo performed "Love Expert", Tsai performed "Marry Me Today" with David Tao, and David Tao performed "Beautiful".
- During the concert in Hangzhou, Show Lo performed "Love Expert", Tsai performed "Remember" with JJ Lin, and JJ Lin performed "Sarang Heyo".
- During the concert in Sydney, Jerry Yan performed "One Meter" and "I Love You with All My Heart".
- During the first concert in Taipei, Tsai performed "Dare to Go to the Cemetery" with Wu Bai, Wu Bai performed "You Are My Flower", Tsai performed "Let Love Come Closer", and Show Lo performed "Dance Gate".
- During the second concert in Taipei, Tsai performed "Hot Desert" with Harlem Yu, Harlem Yu performed "Can't Quit", Tsai performed "Heard That Love's Ever Been Back" and "Let Love Come Closer", and Stanley Huang performed "Sound Wave", but Tsai didn't perform "Exclusive Myth" and "Missing".
- During the third concert in Taipei, Tsai performed with "Marry Me Today" with Jacky Wu, Jacky Wu performed "Play Trick", Tsai performed "Let Love Come Closer", and Elva Hsiao performed "Spokesperson", but Tsai did't perform "Exclusive Myth".
- During the concerts in Petaling Jaya and Singapore, Energy performed "Humanzee", "Unassailable", "Come On", and "Lost Control of Love".
- During the concerts in Beijing, Tsai performed "My Future Is Not a Dream", and Stanley Huang performed "Atheist Like Me".
- During the concert in Fuzhou, Tsai performed "Moonlight in the City".
- During the concerts from Xiamen to Shenzhen, Energy performed "Come On", "Let Go", and "Born to Be Bad".
- During the concert in Guangzhou, Tsai performed "Pretence" half in Mandarin and half in Cantonese.
- During the concerts in Uncasville, Tsai performed "I Won't Last a Day Without You" and "Kiss Me", and Energy performed "Come On" and "Let Go".

== Shows ==
List of concert dates
Date	City	Country	Venue	Attendance	Revenue
September 15, 2006	Hong Kong	China	Hong Kong Coliseum	25,000	—
September 16, 2006	Hong Kong	China	Hong Kong Coliseum	25,000	—
September 23, 2006	Shanghai	China	Hongkou Football Stadium	30,000	—
September 27, 2006	Hangzhou	China	Yellow Dragon Stadium	50,000	—
October 13, 2006	Sydney	Australia	Sydney Entertainment Centre	8,000	—
November 17, 2006	Taipei	Taiwan	Taipei Arena	36,000	NT$95 million
November 18, 2006	Taipei	Taiwan	Taipei Arena	36,000	NT$95 million
November 19, 2006	Taipei	Taiwan	Taipei Arena	36,000	NT$95 million
November 23, 2006 (2 shows)	Uncasville	United States	Mohegan Sun Arena	12,000	—
December 9, 2006	Petaling Jaya	Malaysia	MBPJ Stadium	—	—
April 7, 2007	Singapore		Singapore Indoor Stadium	9,000	—
December 14, 2007	Pahang	Malaysia	Arena of Stars	14,000	—
December 15, 2007	Pahang	Malaysia	Arena of Stars	14,000	—
April 4, 2008	Beijing	China	Workers Indoor Arena	—	—
April 5, 2008	Beijing	China	Workers Indoor Arena	—	—
September 13, 2008	Fuzhou	China	Fuzhou Stadium	—	—
September 20, 2008	Xiamen	China	Xiamen Stadium	—	—
October 6, 2008	Jinan	China	Shandong Provincial Stadium	—	—
November 1, 2008	Macau	China	Venetian Arena	20,000	—
November 8, 2008	Wuhan	China	Xinhua Road Sports Center	—	—
November 29, 2008	Las Vegas	United States	Mirage Event Center	—	—
November 30, 2008	San Jose	United States	Event Center Arena	—	—
December 13, 2008	Guangzhou	China	Guangzhou Gymnasium	—	—
December 20, 2008	Chengdu	China	Sichuan Gymnasium	—	—
December 26, 2008	Shenzhen	China	Shenzhen Stadium	10,000	—
February 8, 2009 (2 shows)	Uncasville	United States	Mohegan Sun Arena	—	—
Total				500,000	NT$1 billion
