= 最愛 =

最愛 or 最爱 may refer to:

- Dearest (最愛), 2021 Japanese television series starring Yuriko Yoshitaka
- Favorite (最愛), album by Taiwanese singer Jolin Tsai
- Love for Life (最爱), 2011 Chinese film
- Moa Kikuchi (菊地 最愛, born 1999), Japanese musician, singer, dancer
- "Most Beloved" (最爱), song by Leslie Cheung in the Cantopop album Virgin Snow
- Passion (最愛), 1986 Hong Kong film starring, directed and written by Sylvia Chang
- "Saiai" (最愛), 2008 single by Ko Shibasaki and Masaharu Fukuyama as Japanese union Koh+
- 最愛, Hong Kong album by George Lam released in June 1986
- 最愛, Hong Kong album by Vivian Chow released in September 1993
