= Favorite (Jolin Tsai album) =

2006 compilation album by Jolin Tsai

Compilation album by Jolin Tsai
- Released: November 3, 2006
- Genre: Dance; pop
- Length: 1:34:31
- Label: Sony BMG
- Producer: Jamie Hsueh

Jolin Tsai chronology
Dancing Forever (2006)	Favorite (2006)	If You Think You Can, You Can! (2007)

Favorite (Chinese: 最愛) is a compilation album by Taiwanese singer Jolin Tsai, released on November 3, 2006, by Sony BMG. The album includes 15 remixed tracks, three soundtrack songs from the film Why Me, Sweetie?! (2003), and one live performance medley.

== Commercial performance ==
In its first week of release, the album ranked number 12 on G-Music's weekly sales chart and number 5 on Five Music's weekly sales chart in Taiwan.

== Critical reception ==
Tencent Entertainment commented that following the release of Dancing Diva (2006), Tsai became a central figure in the music market. Capitalizing on this momentum, Sony released the compilation album J-Top (2006) in May of the same year and later launched Favorite to ride the wave of her second world tour's popularity. However, the review noted that the album felt like a patchwork of songs and criticized the label's marketing strategy, suggesting it failed to resonate with the market.

== Track listing ==
Favorite – Disc 1
No.	Title	Lyrics	Music	Remixer(s)	Length
1.	"J-Game" (remix)	Issac Chen	Jonas Nordelius; Andreas Levander; Awa Manneh	DJ Johnny	4:39
2.	"Greek Girl by the Wishing Pond" (remix)	Alang Huang	Ivana Wong	Oscar	4:05
3.	"Overlooking Purposely" (remix)	Sunny Lee; Francis Lee	Mads Hauge; Vincent DeGiorgio	DJ Johnny	3:51
4.	"Paradise" (remix)	Issac Chen	Jemma Griffiths; Gerard B. Young Jr.; Johann Sebastian Bach; Ward Swingle	A-Tai	3:19
5.	"Prove It" (remix)	Kevin Yi	George Samuelson; Michael Lundh; Quint Starkie; Allan Rich	Oscar	4:06
6.	"Magic" / "36 Tricks of Love" / "Signature Gesture" (remix)	Issac Chen; Kiki Hu	Edward Chan; Charles Lee; Savan Kotecha; Andrew Frampton; Wayne Wilkins	G-Wave	7:33
7.	"The Starter" / "Repeated Note" (remix)	Jolin Tsai	Jamie Hsueh	A-Tai	5:43
8.	"Rope on Vest" / "Be You for a Day" / "Missing You" (remix)	Jolin Tsai; Francis Lee	Clayton Cheung; Jamie Hsueh; Lin Song-chin	Again Tsai	6:29
9.	"Say Love You" / "It's Love" / "Prague Square" (remix)	Simon Liang; Vincent Fang	Jay Chou	G-Wave	6:53
10.	"I'm Still Your Lover" / "Cut Love"	Dian Chen; Eric Lin	Dian Chen; Michael Tu	A-Tai	4:22
11.	"Sky" / "Rewind" (remix)	Wesley Chia; Kiki Hu; Vincent Fang	Wesley Chia; Jay Chou	A-Tai	5:19
12.	"Fake Confess" / "The Smell of Lemon Grass" (remix)	Francis Lee	Paul Lee; Peter Lee	G-Wave	5:58
Total length:					62:17

Favorite – Disc 2
No.	Title	Lyrics	Music	Remixer(s)/Producer(s)	Length
1.	"Oh Oh" (remix)	Issac Chen	Jonas Nordelius; Andreas Levander; Jeanette Olsson		3:23
2.	"Hunting Cupid" (remix)	Jack Chou	Edward Chan; Charles Lee	Oscar	4:33
3.	"Clothing Astrology" (remix)	Francis Lee	Jonas Nordelius; Andreas Levander; Marcus Dernulf	G-Wave	5:26
4.	"Angel of Love" (feat. Andy On)	Andrew Ling	Peter Kam	Jamie Hsueh	4:00
5.	"Darkness"	Andrew Ling	Peter Kam	Jamie Hsueh	4:41
6.	"Sweetie"	Andrew Ling	Peter Kam	Jamie Hsueh	3:35
7.	"Jolin Dance Remix" (Overlooking Purposely / J-Game / Greek Girl by the Wishing Pond / Oh Oh)	Sunny Lee; Francis Lee; Issac Chen; Alang Huang	Mads Hauge; Vincent DeGiorgio; Jonas Nordelius; Andreas Levander; Awa Manneh; Ivana Wong; Jeanette Olsson		6:36
Total length:					32:14

== Release history ==
Region	Date	Format	Distributor
Various	November 3, 2006	Streaming	Sony BMG
China	November 3, 2006	2CD	Epic
Hong Kong	November 3, 2006	2CD	Sony BMG
Malaysia	November 3, 2006	2CD	Sony BMG
Taiwan	November 3, 2006	2CD	Sony BMG
