= Dancing Diva =

2006 studio album by Jolin Tsai

- Standard edition cover

Studio album by Jolin Tsai
- Released: May 12, 2006
- Genre: Pop
- Length: 42:48
- Label: EMI; Mars
- Producer: Adia; Paul Lee; Peter Lee; Paula Ma; Yuri Chan; Stanley Huang

Jolin Tsai chronology
J-Top (2006)	Dancing Diva (2006)	Dancing Forever (2006)

Singles from Dancing Diva
- 1. "Dancing Diva" Released: April 26, 2006

Dancing Diva (Chinese: 舞孃) is the eighth studio album by Taiwanese singer Jolin Tsai, released on May 12, 2006, by EMI. The album was produced by Adia, Paul Lee, Peter Lee, Paula Ma, Yuri Chan, and Stanley Huang. Musically, it is rooted in pop and electronic music, incorporating a wide range of musical styles.

The album sold over 300,000 copies in Taiwan and surpassed 2.5 million copies worldwide, becoming the best-selling album of the year in Taiwan in 2006. It was nominated for Best Mandarin Album at the 18th Golden Melody Awards. Tsai also received a nomination for Best Mandarin Female Singer, while Adia was nominated for Best Single Producer for the track "Dancing Diva". Ultimately, Tsai won both the Best Mandarin Female Singer and the Most Popular Female Singer awards.

== Background and development ==
On December 21, 2005, media reports revealed that Tsai had begun collecting songs for her upcoming album, which was scheduled for release in March or April of the following year. On February 14, 2006, she signed with EMI and announced that recording for the new album was already underway, with a planned release date of May 12. Tsai expressed that record label provided her with abundant musical resources and greater creative freedom.

On February 22, 2006, Ashin revealed that he would be contributing a song to Tsai's new album. By March 15, 2006, media reports confirmed that 80% of the album had been recorded and that the lead single had been finalized.

On March 25, 2006, it was reported that Tsai had completed the album's recording and was planning to travel to Budapest, Hungary, to film music video. On April 11, 2006, media revealed that Tsai had written the song "The Prologue" for the album. Her manager, Howard Chiang, stated that she had penned the lyrics in September of the previous year and had spent a long time searching for the right melody. On April 24, 2006, Tsai traveled to Los Angeles to train in dance for the songs "Pulchritude" and "Mr. Q". On April 28, 2006, it was reported that Stanley Huang had written the track "Nice Guy" for the album.

== Writing and recording ==
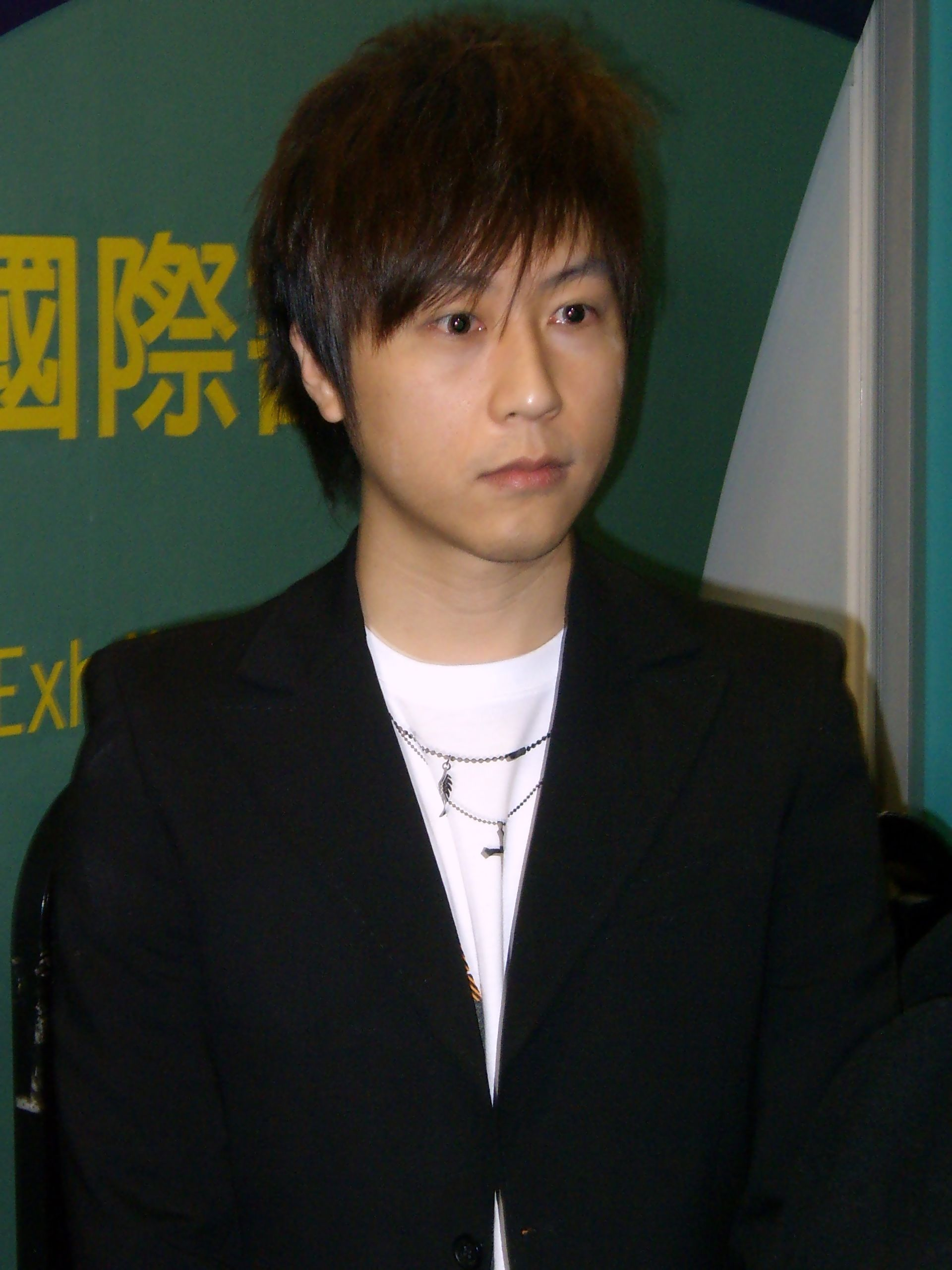
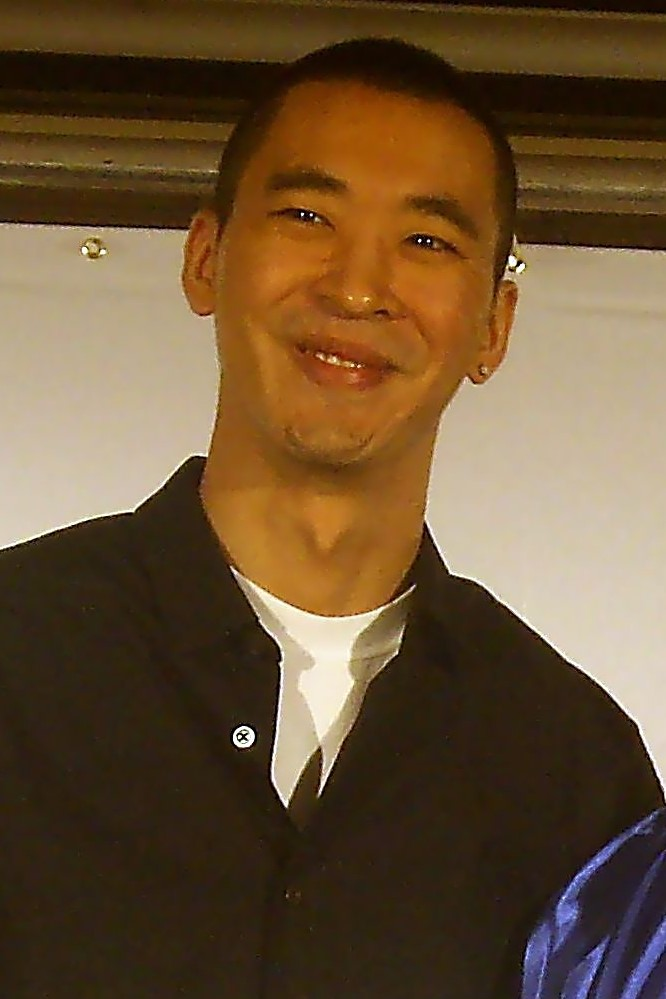
Ashin (left) and Stanley Huang (right), two collaborators on the album

The lead single, "Dancing Diva", blends smooth rhythms with exotic flair, featuring a strong beat paired with catchy lyrics. "Pretence" portrays the emotional struggle of a woman who, despite feeling wronged in a relationship, continues to feign strength. "A Wonder in Madrid" transforms pure emotion into vivid imagery through elements like "arched rooftops" and "flaming red dresses", with the sound of a xylophone evoking a youthful and dreamy atmosphere. "Mr. Q", is an American-style dance track, with Tsai herself contributing lyrics to the English rap segment. "The Prologue" is a melancholic ballad that expresses a liberated perspective on love, where ex-lovers can still remain friends after parting ways.

"Pulchritude" conveys the modern woman's autonomy in both fashion and emotions, emphasizing that women should neither rely on love nor blindly follow trends. "Nice Guy" is a heavy-beat rock duet performed by Tsai and Stanley Huang. "Love in the Shape of a Heart" is a beautifully melodic ballad. "Heart Breaking Day" explores longing after separation and offers a reversed reflection on Valentine's Day. "The Finale" is a heartfelt ballad with sincere and introspective lyrics, delivered by Tsai with a subdued and soulful vocal style. Lastly, "Attraction of Sexy Lips", a commercial song for Max Factor's lip gloss, features a bold rhythm that complements Tsai's sensual image.

== Title and artwork ==
The album title Dancing Diva not only refers to a woman who dances but also conveys the idea of a girl who transforms her inner energy and dances through life. Tsai expressed her desire to showcase her unique style through the album's music and performances, which include both emotionally stirring ballads and energetic dance tracks paired with choreographed routines. Tsai described the album as autobiographical, stating that the term "Dancing Diva" perfectly aligns with her identity as a performer. She emphasized that dance plays a vital role in her performances and is the aspect in which she feels most confident, promising to deliver entirely new choreography. On the official edition of the album cover, Tsai appears in a sheer blouse, white bikini, hot pants, and over-the-knee stockings, holding a three-foot ribbon—striking a pose that radiates both strength and elegance.

== Release and promotion ==
On April 12, 2006, Tsai held a countdown event in Taipei, Taiwan, to mark the upcoming release of her new album. On April 26, 2006, EMI officially announced the start of pre-orders for the album. On May 12, 2006, Tsai hosted a press conference in Taipei to celebrate the album's release. She shared that the album features a wide variety of musical styles, making it difficult to categorize under a single genre, but promised it would bring a fresh experience to listeners. She also revealed that the dance tracks in this album are more diverse than ever, incorporating elements of rock and strong rhythmic beats. Her hope was that the album would inspire greater interest in both music and dance. On July 1, 2006, Tsai held the Pulchritude Concert in Kaohsiung. On July 7, 2006, she released a deluxe edition of the album, which included 11 additional music videos.

=== Single ===
On April 26, 2006, Tsai released the single "Dancing Diva". The following day, she unveiled the music video for the song, co-directed by Marlboro Lai and Bill Chia. The choreography in the video blends elements of reggae, hip-hop, and Middle Eastern dance, resulting in a unique style called the "light wave dance"—a form characterized by explosive power expressed through fluid, undulating movements of the hips and chest. To achieve a distinct visual effect in the choreography, Tsai incorporated rhythmic gymnastics ribbon elements into the performance. She explained that the inspiration struck during a promotional event when she saw the use of ribbons in gymnastics and felt it was the perfect addition for the song. She added that ribbon dancing requires significant strength and demands the legs to be extended to a full 180 degrees, noting that the training left her physically exhausted.

=== Music videos ===
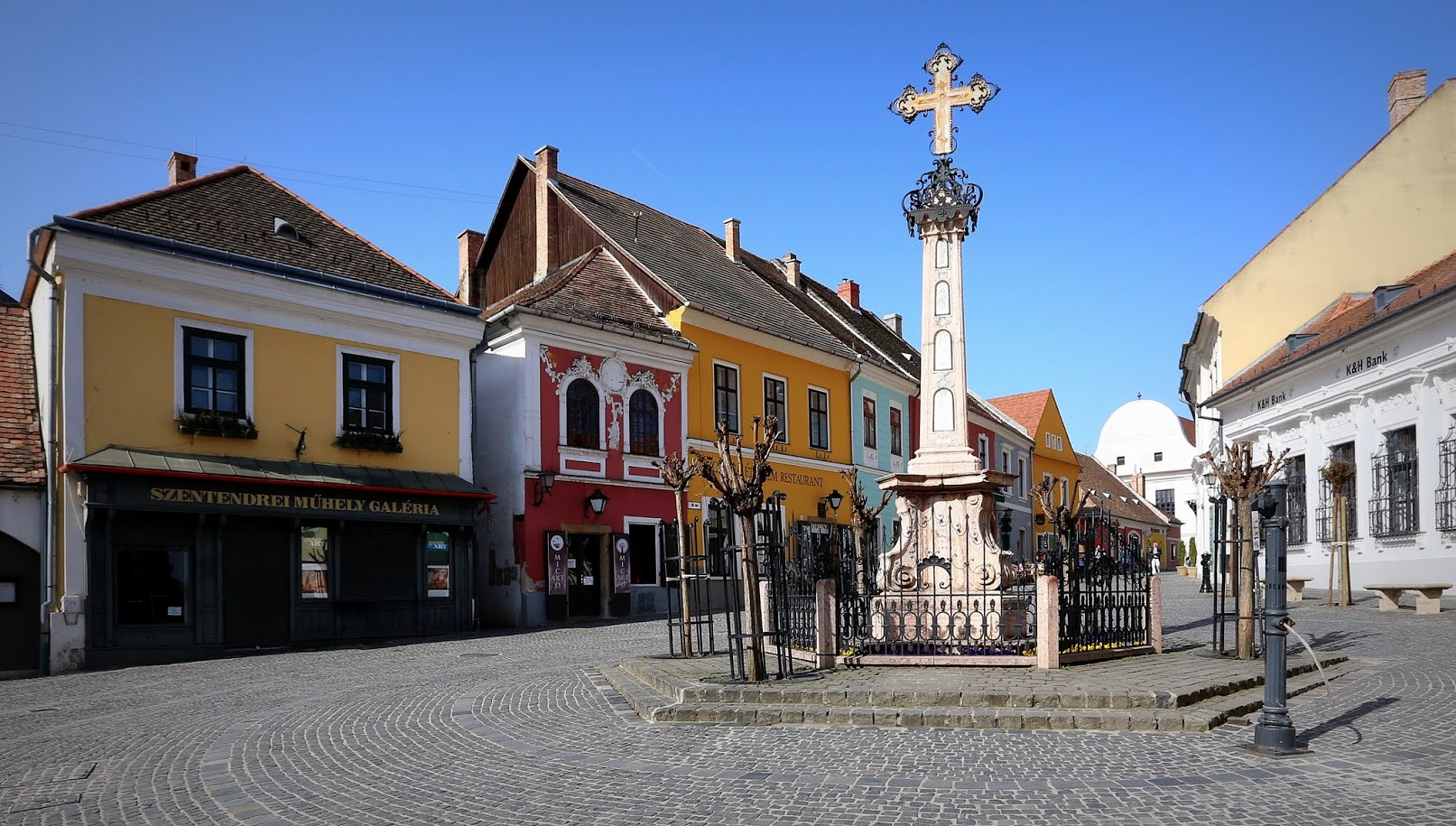
Szentendre's Main Square, one of the filming locations for the music video of "A Wonder in Madrid"

On May 9, 2006, Tsai released the music video for "Pretence", directed by Leste Chen. This marked Tsai's first foray into narrative-style music videos, featuring a storyline closely rooted in real life. Inspired by the visual style of filmmaker Shunji Iwai, the video tells the story of a woman who unexpectedly encounters her ex-boyfriend and his current girlfriend on a bus, triggering memories of her passionate past relationship. On May 15, 2006, Tsai released the music video for "A Wonder in Madrid", directed by Terry & Friends, which was filmed in Szentendre, Hungary. On May 30, 2006, she unveiled the music video for "Mr. Q", directed by Kuang Sheng, featuring a guest appearance by Edison Chen.

On June 12, 2006, the music video for "The Prologue" premiered, directed by May Wen and starring Waser Chou. On June 20, 2006, Tsai released the video for "Pulchritude", directed by Marlboro Lai, characterized by a red-dominant backdrop and dazzling lighting effects that create a shimmering atmosphere. The music video for "Nice Guy" was directed by Chen Hung-i. Both "Love in the Shape of a Heart" and "Heart Breaking Day" had their videos directed by May Wen. The music video for "The Finale" was directed by JP Huang. The music video for "Attraction of Sexy Lips" was directed by Marlboro Lai.

=== Live performances ===
On April 24, 2006, Tsai attended the 2005 Music Radio China Top Charts Awards, where she performed "Attraction of Sexy Lips". On May 6, 2006, she participated in the MTV Asia Awards 2006, performing "Dancing Diva". On May 26, 2006, Tsai took part in the Golden Melody Orz Concert, where she performed "Dancing Diva", "Pretence", and "A Wonder in Madrid". The following day, May 27, she performed "Pretence", "A Wonder in Madrid", and "Dancing Diva" at the Le Party. On May 30, 2006, Tsai appeared on the Taiwanese variety show Variety Big Brother, where she performed "Dancing Diva" and "Mr. Q".

On June 4, 2006, she participated in the Shandong-based variety show Fans Party, performing "Dancing Diva". On July 13, 2006, Tsai performed "Dancing Diva", "Mr. Q", and "A Wonder in Madrid" at the 2006 Volunteer Beijing Concert. On July 21, 2006, she joined the ZPop Charity Concert, where she performed "Pulchritude", "Love in the Shape of a Heart", "Dancing Diva", and "Mr. Q". On July 24, 2006, Tsai recorded a segment for the Chinese variety show Heaven and Earth Heroes Campus Tour, where she performed "Pulchritude", "A Wonder in Madrid", "Pretence", "Love in the Shape of a Heart", "Dancing Diva", and "Mr. Q".

On July 25, 2006, Tsai performed "Dancing Diva", "Pretence", and "Mr. Q" at the Summer Music Festival. On July 26, 2006, she held a special online concert for Sohu Music in Beijing, where she performed "Pulchritude", "A Wonder in Madrid", "Pretence", "Dancing Diva", and "Mr. Q". On August 5, 2006, Tsai participated in the Nine Planets Concert, where she performed "Mr. Q" and "A Wonder in Madrid".

On August 6, 2006, she attended the Metro Radio Mandarin Hits Music Awards 2006, where she performed "Dancing Diva". On August 9, 2006, Tsai appeared on the Hong Kong variety show Jade Solid Gold, performing "Dancing Diva" and "Mr. Q". On August 14, 2006, she performed "Pulchritude", "A Wonder in Madrid", "Dancing Diva", and "Mr. Q" at My FM 8th Anniversary Music Magic Tour. On September 1, 2006, Tsai performed "Dancing Diva", "Kiss Me", "Mr. Q", and "Pretence" at the MTV Mandarin Awards.

=== Touring ===
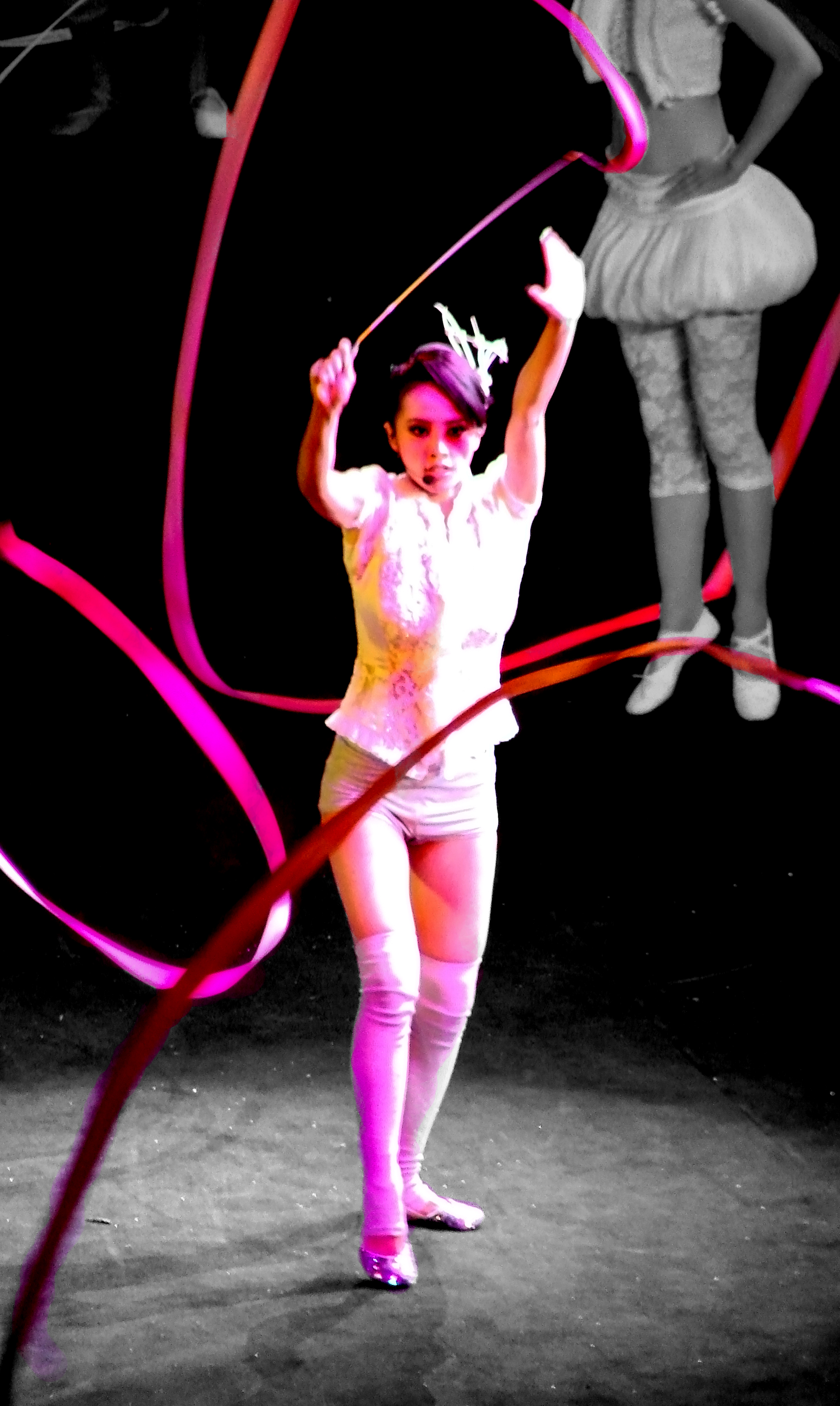
Tsai performing "Dancing Diva" during the Dancing Forever World Tour in Singapore, April 2007

On May 31, 2006, Tsai's manager, Howard Chiang, revealed that she planned to embark on a new concert tour in the second half of the year. On July 17, 2006, Tsai announced that her second world tour, the Dancing Forever World Tour, would kick off on September 15 at the Hong Kong Coliseum. The tour concluded on February 8, 2009, at the Mohegan Sun Arena in Uncasville, United States. Spanning two and a half years, the tour visited 20 cities across Asia, North America, and Oceania, staging a total of 28 shows. It attracted over 500,000 attendees and grossed more than NT$1 billion in ticket sales.

== Commercial performance ==
On April 29, 2006, EMI announced that the album had sold over 100,000 copies within the first three days of pre-order. In its debut week, the album topped weekly sales charts in Taiwan, including those of G-Music and Five Music. By May 28, 2006, media reports confirmed that total sales across Asia had surpassed one million copies. On June 20, 2006, Tsai announced that the album's sales across Asia had exceeded two million copies.

By November 23, 2006, media outlets reported that the album had sold over 230,000 copies in Taiwan alone, with total sales across Asia reaching 2.5 million copies, securing its position as the best-selling album in Taiwan for 2006. On January 12, 2007, the album ranked second on Five Music's annual sales chart, and ten days later, on January 22, it claimed first place on G-Music' annual sales chart. On February 12, 2007, media revealed that the album ranked number six among the best-selling Mandarin albums in Singapore for 2006.

Additionally, the single "Dancing Diva" ranked number 33 on Taiwan's Hit FM Top 100 singles chart in 2006, while "Pretence" and "A Wonder in Madrid" placed number 3 and number 14, respectively.

== Critical reception ==
Taiwan's Marie Claire praised the album, stating, "Dancing Diva marks Jolin Tsai's evolution—from music to music videos, she solidifies her image as a talented singer and dancer. By integrating dance and gymnastics, she delivers stunning performances that captivate fans. Riding this momentum, she won the Best Mandarin Female Singer award and was praised by judges for ‘breaking free from constraints to become a true artist'." Qianjiang Evening News regarded the album as a significant milestone for Tsai, noting that it was from this release onward that she firmly established her status as the "Queen of Dance-Pop". Tencent Music's Yo! Bang Chart commented, "With its exotic musical styles and smooth rhythms, combined with Jolin Tsai's breathtaking dance performances, the album cemented her position as a leading dance-pop artist in the industry." Tencent Entertainment remarked, "Dancing Diva's defining feature is its grandeur—not only evident in the styling and choreography but also prominently expressed in the arrangements, especially the dynamic production of the upbeat tracks, while the ballads reveal a more mature side." Sina Music observed that compared to her previous album J-Game (2005), Dancing Diva shows marked improvements in song quality, overall cohesion, and vocal delivery, offering freshness and surprise.

Voice of Taipei praised the album for its well-curated song selection and concept, enhancing Tsai's feminine charm with exquisite and stylish production. 3C Music website attributed the album's commercial success to Tsai's sexy image, catchy and danceable songs, consistent quality, and elegant packaging. Csheila noted the album's innovation, blending not only R&B dance tracks but also psychedelic electronic and exotic elements, creating a fresh auditory experience. Music Copyright Society of Chinese Taipei recognized Dancing Diva for crafting a brand-new dance style for Tsai, propelling her to the crown of the Golden Melody Awards. Liu Ya-wen, head of the judging panel at the 18th Golden Melody Awards, praised Tsai's outstanding performance and the album's rich content, saying it freed her from the constraints of being just an entertainer and established her as a genuine singer. Taiwan's Apple Music highlighted the album's infusion of exotic elements into its dance music style and noted that it earned Tsai the Best Mandarin Female Singer award at the 18th Golden Melody Awards. The title track "Dancing Diva", along with "A Wonder in Madrid" and "Pretence", became major hits in the music scene. Tencent Music's Wave Committee ranked Dancing Diva number 42 among the 200 Best Mandarin Albums from 2001 to 2020 for the decade 2001–2010.

== Accolades ==
On August 6, 2006, Tsai won the Best Asian Singer and Best Stage Performance awards at the 2006 Metro Radio Mandarin Hits Music Awards. Her song "Dancing Diva" received both the Song of the Year and Top Songs awards. Additionally, her track "Pretence" was awarded Top Songs. On August 31, 2006, Tsai also earned the MTV Mandarin Award for Top 20 Most Popular Singer award. On October 28, 2006, she was recognized as one of the Top 5 Most Outstanding Taiwanese Singers at the 6th Global Chinese Music Awards in Taiwan, with "Dancing Diva" being named one of the Top 20 Most Popular Songs. On November 10, 2006, Tsai received the China Fashion Awards for Hong Kong/Taiwan Fashion Female Singer and Asian Breakthrough Singer.

On December 15, 2006, Tsai was awarded Most Popular Singer at the Music Pioneer Awards, with "Dancing Diva" also being honored as one of the Top 10 Hong Kong/Taiwan Songs. On January 18, 2007, Tsai won Most Admired Mandarin Female Singer at the Canadian Chinese Pop Music Awards, while "Pretence" was named one of the Top 10 Most Admired Mandarin Songs. On January 25, 2007, "Dancing Diva" was awarded Best Taiwan Song of the Year at the 13th China Music Awards. On February 2, 2007, Tsai received multiple honors at the KKBox Music Awards, including Best Female Artist of the Year, with the album also taking home Album of the Year honors. Songs "Dancing Diva" and "Pretence" were recognized among the Top 20 Songs of the Year, while "A Wonder in Madrid" earned Top 20 Songs of the Year and Most Consecutive Chart-Topping Song accolades.

On February 3, 2007, she won Best Female Singer, Most Popular Female Singer, and Internet Premier Song Popularity Award at the Hito Music Awards. The album was recognized as Most Long-Lasting Album of the Year, and "Dancing Diva" was named one of the Top 10 Chinese Songs of the Year. On February 24, 2007, she won Most Popular Taiwanese Singer and Top 10 Singers at the 1st Family Music Awards, with the album also recognized as one of the Top 10 Albums. "Pretence" earned a Top 10 Songs award, and "A Wonder in Madrid" received the Most Popular Karaoke Song award. On March 22, 2007, the album was named one of the Top 10 Best Selling Mandarin Albums of 2006 at the IFPI Hong Kong Top Sales Awards. On March 25, 2007, Tsai won Top 5 Chinese Singer of the Year at the 14th Chinese Top Ten Music Awards.

On May 4, 2007, the 18th Golden Melody Awards announced Tsai's nominations, including Best Mandarin Female Singer and Best Mandarin Album. Additionally, producer Adia was nominated for Best Single Producer for "Dancing Diva". On May 20, 2007, Tsai received the Most Popular Taiwanese Female Singer and Best Stage Performance Award at the 4th Music King Awards, with "Dancing Diva" winning Top Mandarin Songs. On June 16, 2007, Tsai won Best Mandarin Female Singer and Most Popular Female Singer at the 18th Golden Melody Awards. On June 29, 2007, she also received the Music Radio China Top Chart Awards, including Best Album Sales Female Singer and Best Hong Kong/Taiwan Album of the Year, with "Dancing Diva" named Best Song of the Year.

== Track listing ==
Dancing Diva – Standard / Perfect Celebration edition
No.	Title	Lyrics	Music	Producer(s)	Length
1.	"Pulchritude" (玩美)	Luke Tsui	Lars Quang; Thea Winkelmann	Adia	3:33
2.	"Dancing Diva" (舞孃)	Issac Chen	Miriam Nervo; Olivia Nervo; Greg Kurstin	Adia	3:04
3.	"A Wonder in Madrid" (馬德里不思議)	Alang Huang	Hagen Troy	Paul Lee	3:35
4.	"Pretence" (假裝)	Howard Chiang	Howard Ku	Paula Ma	5:15
5.	"Attraction of Sexy Lips" (唇唇欲動)	Sunny Lee	Terry Lee	Adia	3:11
6.	"Love in the Shape of a Heart" (心型圈)	Vincent Fang	Yuri Chan	Yuri Chan	4:10
7.	"Heart Breaking Day" (離人節)	Matthew Yen	Alex Fung	Peter Lee	4:11
8.	"Mr. Q"	Issac Chen	Miriam Nervo; Olivia Nervo; Ben Thomas; Dele Ladimeji	Adia	3:21
9.	"Nice Guy" (乖乖牌)	Luke Tsui	Stanley Huang	Stanley Huang	3:19
10.	"The Finale" (最終話)	Ashin	Peter Lee	Peter Lee	4:38
11.	"The Prologue" (開場白)	Jolin Tsai	Xiao Yu	Peter Lee	4:31
Total length:					42:48

Dancing Diva – Perfect Celebration edition (DVD)
No.	Title	Length
1.	"Pulchritude" (music video)	3:44
2.	"Dancing Diva" (music video)	3:42
3.	"A Wonder in Madrid" (music video)	3:33
4.	"Pretence" (music video)	5:25
5.	"Attraction of Sexy Lips" (music video)	3:13
6.	"Love in the Shape of a Heart" (music video)	4:08
7.	"Heart Breaking Day" (music video)	4:05
8.	"Mr. Q" (music video)	3:18
9.	"Nice Guy" (music video)	3:25
10.	"The Finale" (music video)	4:41
11.	"The Prologue" (music video)	4:32
Total length:		43:46

== Release history ==
Region	Date	Format(s)	Edition	Distributor
Various	May 12, 2006	Streaming	Standard	Mars
China	May 12, 2006	CD; cassette	Standard	Push Typhoon
China	June 1, 2006	CD	Limited	Push Typhoon
China	August 29, 2006	DVD; VCD	Video compilation	Push Typhoon
Hong Kong	May 12, 2006	CD	Standard	EMI
Hong Kong	July 7, 2006	CD+DVD	Perfect Celebration	EMI
Malaysia	May 12, 2006	CD	Standard	EMI
Malaysia	July 7, 2006	CD+DVD	Perfect Celebration	EMI
Malaysia	August 29, 2006	VCD	Video compilation	EMI
Taiwan	May 12, 2006	CD	Standard	EMI
Taiwan	July 7, 2006	CD+DVD	Perfect Celebration	EMI
