= Skank (dance) =

Dancing style from Jamaica since 1950s/1960s

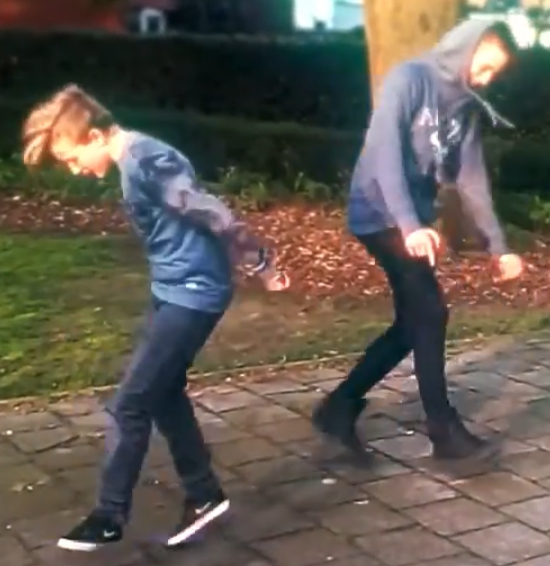
Two boys skanking

Skanking is a form of dancing practiced in the ska, ska punk, hardcore punk, reggae, drum and bass and other music scenes.

The dance style originated in the 1950s or 1960s at Jamaican dance halls, where ska music was played. Ska music has a prominent backbeat played by the electric guitar on beats two and four of a 4/4 bar of music. When ska became popular amongst British mods and skinheads of the 1960s, these UK youth adopted these types of dances and altered them. The dancing style was revived during the 1970s and 1980s 2 Tone era, and has been adopted by some in the hardcore punk subculture.

== Types ==
Originally, skanking consisted of a "running man" motion of the legs to the beat while alternating bent-elbow fist-punches, left and right. Over time, variations emerged. The punk version, commonly known as two-stepping, features a sharp striking out look with the arms, and is sometimes used in moshing to knock around others doing the same. However, this is rarely seen as an act of true aggression but rather a consensual release of emotion.

This rough appearance tends to lead to negative stereotypes of violence, though they are rare at best and almost never tolerated by venue operators, bands, or other audience members. While the flailing, swinging, and pushing may appear dangerous, there is almost always a conscious effort by each dancer in the 'pit' to refrain from actually striking or hurting each other. Additionally, should any one person trip and fall, others in the group tend to avoid trampling them and even help them to get back up.

The style, speed, and moves used when skanking are as diverse as the music it is performed to, usually dictated by its rhythm and genre. For example, the skanking done at a reggae concert would typically be slower and more restrained than the skanking done at a hardcore punk show. An example of this is the lighter style known as 'stroll' which has become popularized by American ska-punk bands, mainly Big D and the Kids Table. In this style, dancers tend to 'stroll' in a circle around the center 'pit' while rhythmically swaying from side to side with arms bent and marching in sync to the music.

In drum and bass music, skanking is very different from ska, punk or reggae skanking. Also referred to as x-outing, x-stepping or dnb stepping, it is characterised by its fast, technical movements. It is often seen at raves and other drum and bass events to show enjoyment for the song, especially at the heavier, more danceable parts of the song after the 'beat drop'.
