= Dance hall (Jamaican) =

The dance halls of Jamaica in the 1950s and 1960s were home to public dances usually targeted at younger patrons. Sound system operators had big home-made audio systems (often housed in the flat bed of a pickup truck), spinning records from popular American rhythm and blues musicians and Jamaican ska and rocksteady performers. The term dancehall has also come to refer to a subgenre of reggae that originated around 1980.

== History ==
Dance hall owners and sound system operators often competed fiercely with other owners/operators to capture the attention of their young clientele. The competition often led to the hiring of Rude boys to break up a competitor's dance, which fostered the growth and violent tendencies of this subculture. Dance halls contributed to the rise of ska as the predominant form of popular music at the time, and gave rise to a new social power in the form of major sound system operators like Duke Reid, and Coxsone Dodd. It was in the dance halls that ska dancing originated.

Jamaican dance halls of today still bear strong resemblance to the days when Dodd was spinning the latest release out of Studio One. Dance halls of today often serve as competition grounds for DJs, just like they did in the early days, though today's competitions end less often in the dance being broken up by rude boys.

== Notable early DJs ==
Coxsone Dodd was born on January 26 1932 in Kingston, Jamaica. He began at a young age playing bebop and jazz records in his parents' liquor store for their customers in the late 1940s. He then moved to United States to work as a cane cutter, and it was there that he began to listen to rhythm and blues. After a short period of time he moved back to Jamaica with his own PA system, turntable, and box of records. Dodd set up his first sound system, the DownBeat, in 1954 playing boogie-woogie, jazz, and R&B. Prince Buster was born Cecil Campbell in 1938 in Kingston, Jamaica. After working for the Coxson Sound System, he created his own sound system in 1962 called The Voice of the People. Campbell dedicated himself to providing a voice for the African diaspora.
