= Fuzhou Stadium =

Sports venue in Fuzhou, Fujian, China

Fujian Olympic Sports Center Stadium
- Interactive map of Fujian Olympic Sports Center Stadium
- Full name: 福建省奥林匹克体育中心
- Location: Fuzhou, China
- Coordinates: 26.114°N 119.299°E
- Owner: Fujian Province
- Capacity: 23,000

Construction
- Groundbreaking: 1986
- Opened: 1989

Fuzhou Stadium (Chinese: 福建省奥林匹克体育中心), is a multi-purpose stadium in Fuzhou, China. It is currently used mostly for football matches. Fujian Olympic Sports Center has a capacity of 30,000 people, and the main stadium holds 23,000 spectators.
