= Attraction of Sexy Lips =

Promotional single by Jolin Tsai
- Language: Mandarin
- Released: December 30, 2005
- Genre: Pop
- Length: 3:11
- Label: Mars
- Composer: Terry Lee
- Lyricist: Sunny Lee
- Producer: Adia

Music video
- "Attraction of Sexy Lips" on YouTube

"Attraction of Sexy Lips" (Chinese: 唇唇欲動; pinyin: Chún chún yù dòng) is a song by Taiwanese singer Jolin Tsai, featured on her eighth studio album Dancing Diva (2006). Written by Sunny Lee and Terry Lee, and produced by Adia, the track was used as the commercial song for Max Factor's lipstick product and was released as a promotional single on December 30, 2005, by Max Factor.

== Background and release ==
On July 12, 2005, Tsai was announced as the ambassador for Max Factor in the Greater China region. By December 12, 2005, it was reported that she had recorded a new song specifically for promoting the brand's lipstick, with the music video incorporating clips from the commercial. This marked a bold departure from Tsai's previous work.

The song was included in Tsai's book Jolin's Party, released on December 30, 2005, and features a strong beat designed to align with Tsai's sensual image. The accompanying music video was directed by Marlboro Lai,.

== Critical reception ==
The Chinese review site 3C Music described the track as a refreshing drum and bass song, praising its catchy chorus. The lyrics, including the line "the perfect smile of lips that make you distracted and mesmerized", were noted for being simple and easy to sing along to.

== Live performances ==
Tsai performed "Attraction of Sexy Lips" at the 2005 Music Radio China Top Chart Awards on April 24, 2006. She also performed the track at the MTV Concert in Taipei on September 1, 2006.

== Track listing ==
- Promotional CD
1. "Attraction of Sexy Lips" — 3:11
2. "Attraction of Sexy Lips" (music video) — 3:13
3. Max Factor TV commercial
4. Max Factor TV commercial (behind-the-scenes)

== Credits and personnel ==
- Adia – backing vocals, backing vocal arrangement
- Jolin Tsai – backing vocals
- AJ Chen – recording engineering
- Keller Wang – mixing engineering

== Release history ==
Release dates and formats for "Attraction of Sexy Lips"
Region	Date	Format(s)	Distributor
Taiwan	December 30, 2005	CD	Max Factor
