= Junda Chen =

Singaporean musician and composer

- Birth name: HAGEN JUNDA CHEN
- Born: 30 August; Singapore
- Genres: Mandarin pop
- Occupations: Singer-Songwriter, producer, Creative Director
- Years active: 2005–present
- Website: www.JUNDAOFFICIAL.COM

Junda Chen, also known as Hagen Troy, is a Singaporean musician and composer. He has written songs for famous singers in the Asia music industry such as Ocean Ou, Harlem Yu, Wilbur Pan, Jocie Guo, Rachel Liang and Jolin Tsai.

His album Answer was recommended by Straits Time's Life. It was also the soundtrack of drama "Bountiful Blessings", starring popular Hong Kong actress, Jessica Hsuan during the year.

HagenTroy was mentioned by MyPaper as an "artist to note" in May 2013.

== Work ==
In 2011, Troy made a crossover into the mainstream Chinese Pop market, a releasing his debut Album “Answer”.

He was a Health Promotion Board's Breathe Ambassador in April 2011. He also composed and sang their theme song, "The Choice is mine".
