= Fantasy (Jolin Tsai song) =

Song by Jolin Tsai

from the album Muse
- Released: September 14, 2012
- Recorded: 2012
- Studio: Impact (Taipei); VIP (Taipei)
- Genre: Dance-pop
- Length: 3:29
- Label: Warner; Mars
- Composers: Mikko Tamminen; Udo Mechels; Rike Boomgaarden
- Lyricist: Greeny Wu
- Producer: Michael Lin

Music video
- "Fantasy" on YouTube

"Fantasy" (Chinese: 迷幻; pinyin: Mí huàn) is a song by Taiwanese singer Jolin Tsai. It appears on her twelfth studio album, Muse (2012), which was released on September 14, 2012. The song was written by Mikko Tamminen, Udo Mechels, Rike Boomgaarden, and Greeny Wu, with production by Michael Lin.

== Background and development ==
The inspiration for "Fantasy" stemmed from Tsai's close observation of the emotional lives of her LGBTQ+ friends. In discussions with songwriter Greeny Wu, she expressed her desire to create a piece that celebrates true love—emphasizing that love transcends gender and that everyone deserves the right to pursue sincere and meaningful relationships. Wu captured this vision through emotionally rich lyrics and abstract imagery, giving the song a layered and poignant musical expression. Tsai has stated that she hopes the song will serve as a symbol of authentic love in the hearts of listeners.

== Music video ==
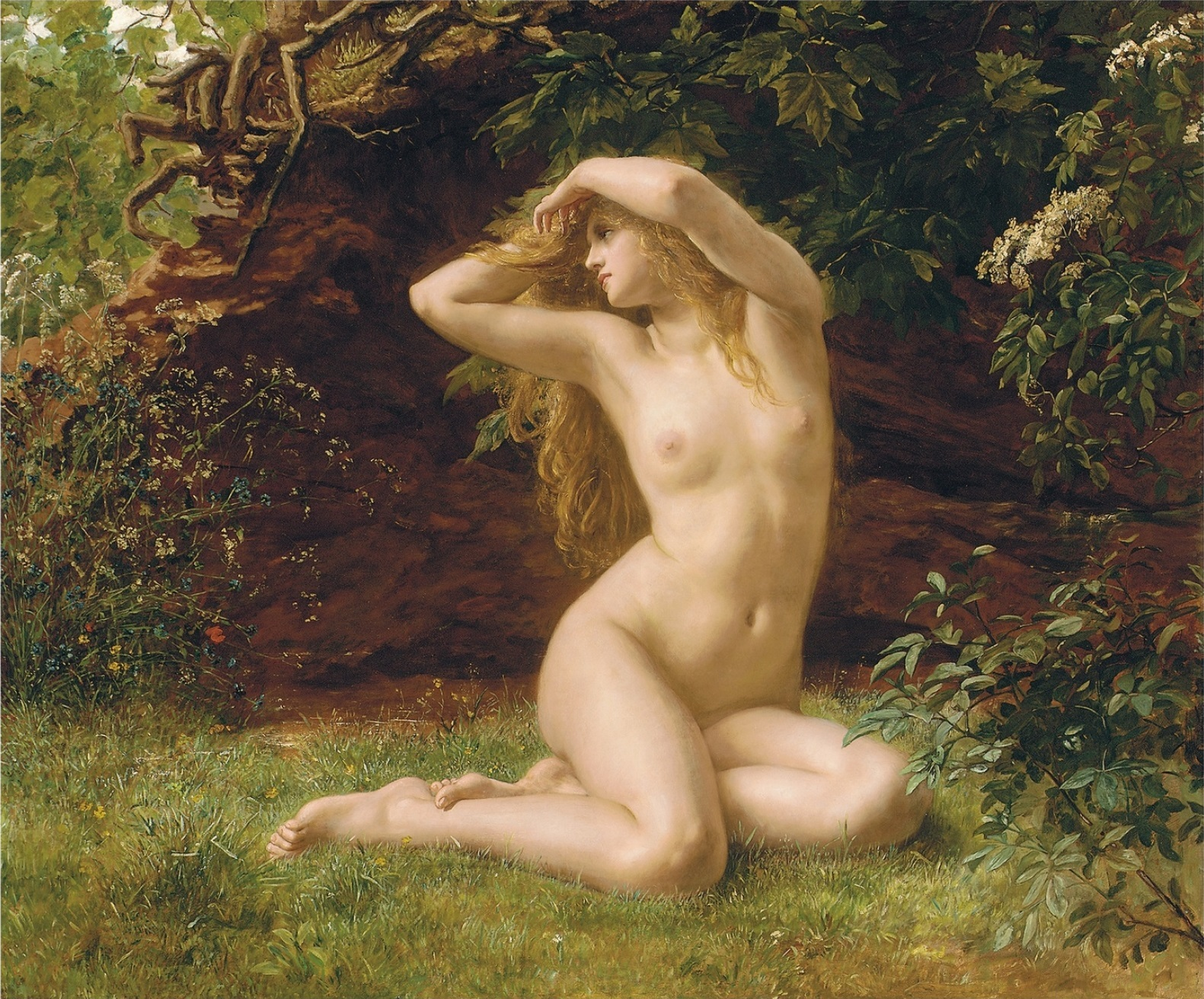
Tsai portrays a "modern Eve" in the music video.

The music video for "Fantasy" premiered on October 25, 2012 at 12:00 PM. Directed by Bill Chia, the music video presents the concept of a "Modern Garden of Eden"—a utopia where love exists free of gender, race, or identity boundaries. It was filmed primarily at the Future Pavilion in the Taipei Expo Park. To align with the video's conceptual theme, Tsai transformed into a "modern Eve", adopting what has been described as the boldest look of her career. Her outfit consisted of nothing but a Nubra and nude shorts, with 120-centimeter-long pastel pink hair extensions flowing to her knees, serving as a symbolic garment. American choreographer Derek Mitchell, known for his work with Rihanna, crafted the video's choreography, which emphasized fluidity and sensuality. Tsai expressed that in contemporary life, various forms of romantic relationships are widely present, and same-sex couples—whether male or female—are common in her circle. She believes that love is equal, and that bringing the imagery of the "Garden of Eden" into a modern context aligns perfectly with the lyrical theme of "Fantasy".

== Live performances ==
On November 5, 2012, she participated in the recording of Hunan TV's Your Face Sounds Familiar, performing "Fantasy". On January 19, 2013, Tsai performed "Fantasy" at the 8th KKBox Music Awards. On January 30, 2013, she performed "Fantasy" at the Taiwan Music Night held in Paris.

== Credits and personnel ==
=== Recording ===
- Recorded at Impact Studio, Taipei
- Recorded at VIP Studio, Taipei
- Mixed at Pro Tool Mixing Studio

=== Personnel ===
- Fang Po-chieh – production assistance, recording engineering
- Michael Lin – backing vocal arrangement, recording engineering
- Jolin Tsai – backing vocals
- Ken Lewis – mixing engineering
