= Journey (Jolin Tsai song) =

Single by Jolin Tsai
- Language: Mandarin
- Released: September 17, 2013
- Recorded: July 2013
- Genre: Pop
- Length: 3:59
- Label: Warner; Mars
- Composers: Jaakko Salovaara; Park Geun-tae; Nalle Ahlstedt
- Lyricist: Matthew Yen
- Producer: Michael Lin

Jolin Tsai singles chronology
| "The Great Artist" (2012) | "Journey" (2013) | "Kaleidoscope" (2014) |

Music video
- "Journey" on YouTube

"Journey" (Chinese: 旅程; pinyin: Lǚchéng) is a song by Taiwanese singer Jolin Tsai. The lyrics were written by Matthew Yen, with music composed by Jaakko Salovaara, Park Geun-tae, and Nalle Ahlstedt, and production by Michael Lin. Serving as the theme song for Swarovski's "Music Journey" campaign, it was released as a single on September 11, 2013, by Warner.

== Background and release ==
On September 11, 2013, Tsai was appointed as the ambassador for Swarovski's "Music Journey" campaign. On the same day, she released the single "Journey" as the theme song for the event.

Francis Belin, senior vice president for Swarovski Consumer Goods Business in Greater China, stated that the brand aimed to leverage music and Tsai's influence in fashion styling and pop music to effectively convey trends and product information.

== Composition and recording ==
The song was recorded in July 2013 in London, England. Tsai explained that the lyrics resonate with the mindset of contemporary youth, describing the track as a journey of self-discovery. She emphasized that the song reflects the process of searching, both externally and internally, highlighting the importance of both forms of exploration.

== Music video ==
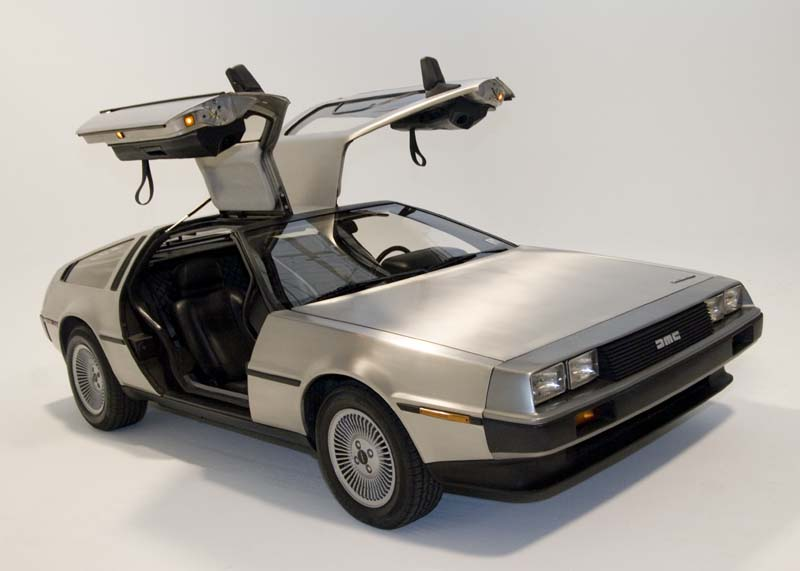
The DeLorean DMC-12 sports car was featured as one of the key props in the music video.

On September 17, 2013, Tsai released the music video for the song, directed by Bill Chia. In the video, Tsai dons nine different outfits, complemented by over a hundred crystal accessories provided by Swarovski. The production also featured the iconic DeLorean DMC-12 sports car from the film Back to the Future (1985) to enhance the visual storytelling.

Natalie Gohlen, creative director of Swarovski Consumer Goods Business, remarked that Tsai's versatile fashion image perfectly aligns with the brand's innovative jewelry style. The video showcases this season's statement pieces–including large jewelry, bangles, and brooches–brought to life through Tsai's dynamic looks.

== Commercial performance ==
The song ranked 15th on Taiwan's Hit FM Top 100 Singles chart in 2013.

== Track listing ==
- Digital download and streaming

1. "Journey" – 3:34

- Promotional CD+DVD

1. "Journey" – 3:34
2. "Journey" (music video) – 3:36

== Release history ==
Release dates and formats for "Journey"
| Region | Date | Format(s) | Distributor |
|---|---|---|---|
| Various | September 17, 2013 | Digital download; streaming; radio airplay | Warner |
