= Dancing Diva (song) =

- Promotional CD cover

Single by Jolin Tsai

from the album Dancing Diva
- Language: Mandarin
- Released: April 26, 2006
- Recorded: 2006
- Studio: Mega Force (New Taipei)
- Genre: Pop
- Length: 3:04
- Label: EMI; Mars
- Composers: Miriam Nervo; Olivia Nervo; Greg Kurstin
- Lyricist: Isaac Chen
- Producer: Adia

Jolin Tsai singles chronology
"My Choice" (2006)	"Dancing Diva" (2006)	"Marry Me Today" (2006)

Music video
- "Dancing Diva" on YouTube

"Dancing Diva" (Chinese: 舞孃; pinyin: Wǔ niáng) is a song by Taiwanese singer Jolin Tsai, released as the lead single from her eighth studio album of the same name, Dancing Diva (2006). The song was written by Miriam Nervo, Olivia Nervo, Greg Kurstin, and Issac Chen, and produced by Adia. It was released on April 26, 2006, by EMI as the album's first single.

== Background ==
In December 2005, Taiwanese media reported that Tsai had begun collecting songs for her next studio album, initially scheduled for release in March or April 2006. On February 14, 2006, she officially signed with EMI and announced that recording was underway. Tsai expressed enthusiasm for her new creative environment, stating that EMI's abundant musical resources offered her greater freedom to explore her artistic direction. By mid-March 2006, about 80% of the album had been completed, and the lead single had been chosen. On March 25, 2006, reports confirmed that Tsai had finished recording the entire album.

== Composition ==
"Dancing Diva" features a sleek and smooth rhythm infused with exotic musical elements and a strong percussive beat. The song's catchy melody and easy-to-sing lyrics contributed to its wide appeal.

== Music video ==
The music video for "Dancing Diva" premiered on April 27, 2006, and was co-directed by Marlboro Lai and Bill Chia. The choreography combines elements of reggae, hip-hop, and Middle Eastern dance, forming a distinctive hybrid style referred to as "light wave dance", characterized by fluid yet powerful movements of the hips and chest.

To enhance the visual dynamic, Tsai incorporated rhythmic gymnastics ribbon techniques into the performance after being inspired by television footage. She undertook specialized gymnastics training, which included demanding conditioning exercises and 180-degree leg stretches, to master the ribbon choreography. Tsai later described the training as physically challenging but rewarding, marking a key stage in her evolution as a performer.

== Commercial performance ==
"Dancing Diva" ranked number 33 on Hit FM Top 100 Singles of the Year in Taiwan for 2006.

== Critical reception ==
Voice of Taipei praised its distinctive exotic tone and driving rhythm, highlighting Tsai's bold foray into Middle Eastern-inspired dance music and her successful reinvention as a versatile performer. The review also noted the innovative use of ribbon dance and yoga-inspired poses in the video, emphasizing Tsai's artistic transformation. Similarly, music platform 3C Music commended the song's smooth melody and the addition of reggae offbeat rhythms, describing the track as mature and rhythmically compelling compared to Tsai's earlier pop work.

== Accolades ==
"Dancing Diva" received the Song of the Year and Top Songs awards at the Metro Radio Mandarin Hits Music Awards in 2006. It was also recognized among the Top 20 Most Popular Songs at the 6th Global Chinese Music Awards, and earned the Music Pioneer Award for Top 10 Hong Kong/Taiwan Songs later that year. In 2007, it was honored as the Best Taiwan Song of the Year at the 13th China Music Awards, and was ranked among the Top 20 Songs of the Year at the KKBox Music Awards. The Hito Music Awards named it one of the Top 10 Chinese Songs of the Year, while Adia was nominated for Best Single Producer at the 18th Golden Melody Awards for his production work on the track. The song also received recognition from the Music King Awards and the Music Radio China Top Chart Awards as one of the top Mandarin songs of the year.

== Live performances ==
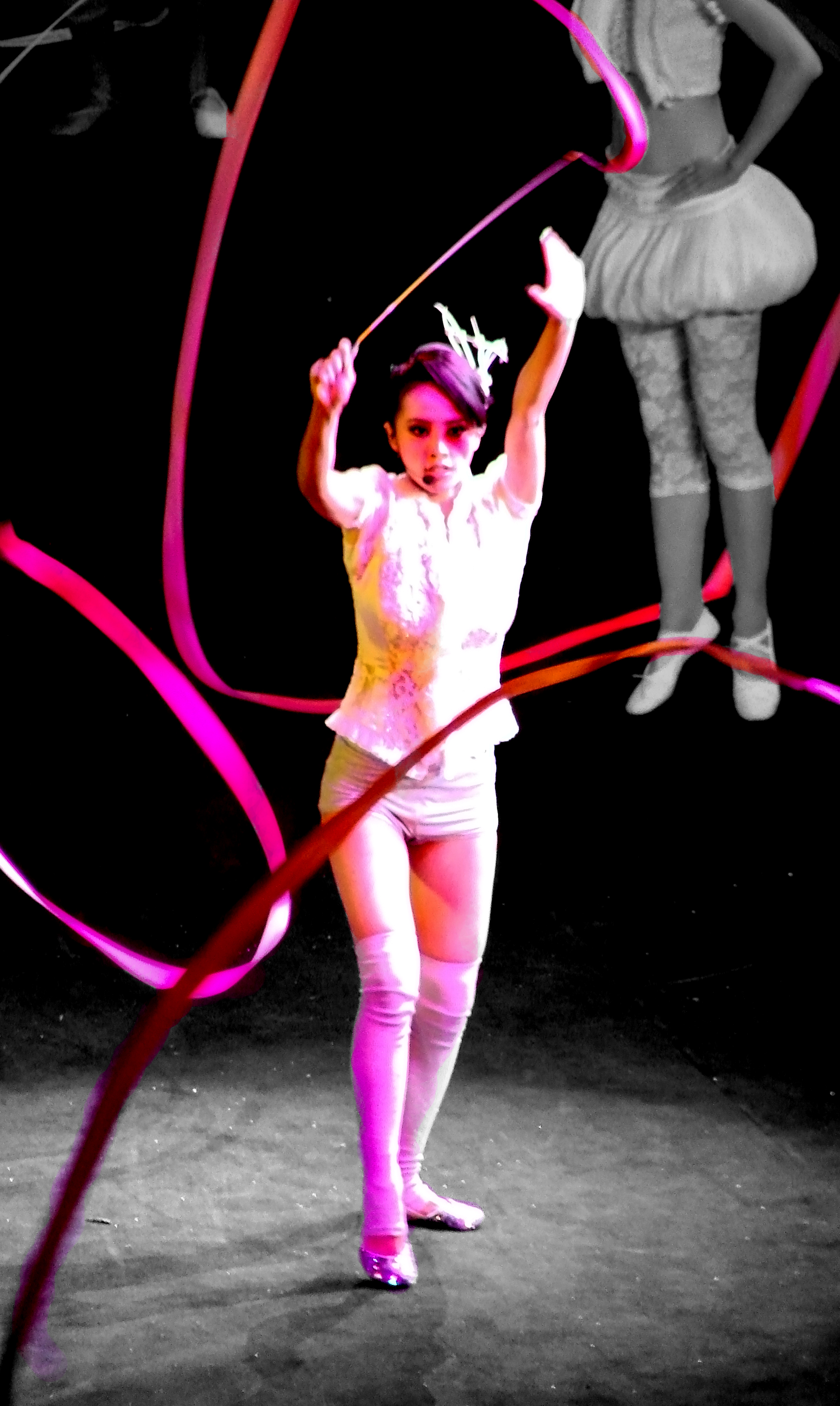
Tsai performing "Dancing Diva" during the Dancing Forever World Tour in Singapore, April 2007

Tsai first performed "Dancing Diva" live at the MTV Asia Awards 2006 on May 6, 2006. Later that month, she appeared at the Golden Melody Orz Concert on May 26, 2006, where she also performed the song, followed by another live performance at Le Party on May 27, 2006. On May 30, 2006, she recorded a special performance of the track for the Taiwanese variety show Variety Big Brother.

On June 4, 2006, Tsai brought the song to audiences on Fans Party, a variety program aired by Shandong TV. She continued to promote "Dancing Diva" throughout the summer, performing it at the Volunteer Beijing Concert on July 13, 2006, and the ZPop Charity Concert on July 21, 2006.

Tsai recorded an additional televised performance for Dragon TV's Heaven and Earth Heroes Campus Tour on July 24, 2006, followed by live renditions at the Summer Music Festival on July 25, 2006, and a special online concert hosted by Sohu Music in Beijing on July 26, 2006.

She also performed the song at the Metro Radio Mandarin Hits Music Awards 2006 on August 6, 2006, and later appeared on Hong Kong's popular variety show Jade Solid Gold on August 9, 2006. On August 14, 2006, she took part in the My FM 8th Anniversary Music Magic Tour, where "Dancing Diva" was featured as part of her setlist. Tsai concluded the promotional cycle for the single with a performance at the MTV Mandarin Awards on September 1, 2006.

== Track listings ==
- Taiwanese CD single
1. "Dancing Diva" – 3:04
- Mainland Chinese CD single
1. "Dancing Diva" – 3:04
2. "Pretence" – 5:15

== Release history ==
Release dates and formats for "Dancing Diva"
Region	Date	Format(s)	Distributor
China	April 26, 2006	Radio airplay	Push Typhoon
Taiwan	April 26, 2006	Radio airplay	EMI
