= Pulchritude (song) =

Promotional single by Jolin Tsai
- Language: Mandarin
- Released: June 20, 2006
- Studio: Mega Force (New Taipei)
- Genre: Pop
- Length: 3:33
- Label: EMI; Mars
- Composers: Lars Quang; Thea Winkelmann
- Lyricist: Luke Tsui
- Producer: Adia

Music video
- "Pulchritude" on YouTube

"Pulchritude" (Chinese: 玩美; pinyin: Wán měi) is a song by Taiwanese singer Jolin Tsai, featured on her eighth studio album Dancing Diva (2006). The track was written by Luke Tsui, Lars Quang, and Thea Winkelmann, and produced by Adia. It was also used as a commercial song for the personal care brand Lux and was released as a promotional single on June 20, 2006.

== Background ==
On February 14, 2006, Tsai signed with EMI and began recording her new album, which was later announced for release on May 12, 2006. By March 25, 2006, media outlets reported that the album's recording had been completed. On April 24, 2006, Tsai traveled to Los Angeles to learn the choreography for "Pulchritude". On June 8, 2006, Lux announced Tsai as its regional ambassador for Asia.

== Composition ==
The lyrics of "Pulchritude" depict the 21st-century woman's autonomy in expressing fashion and emotions, focusing on independence from relationships and resistance to blindly following trends.

== Release ==
A promotional VCD single for "Pulchritude" was released on June 20, 2006. The VCD included the music video, behind-the-scenes footage, Lux television commercials, and related making-of clips. On September 28, 2006, Tsai attended the Lux Silk Nourishment Body Wash Launch and the "Pulchritude" MV Imitation Contest Award Ceremony in Shanghai, where the promotional CD single was also issued.

== Music video ==
The music video for "Pulchritude", directed by Marlboro Lai, was released on June 20, 2006. Set against a dominant red backdrop with radiant lighting, the video features Tsai in a white wig and a silver sequin chiffon dress, exuding a glamorous and regal aura. She also appears in aristocratic-inspired attire, performing alongside eight dancers to highlight a sense of noble elegance. Lux specially commissioned a jeweler to design a "Lux" diamond necklace for the video, encrusted with a 10-carat diamond and valued at over NT$1 million. Tsai paired the necklace with a low-cut evening gown to accentuate its brilliance.

== Live performances ==
On July 21, 2006, Tsai performed "Pulchritude" at the ZPop Charity Concert. Three days later, on July 24, she sang the track on Dragon TV's variety program Heroes Campus Tour. On July 26, 2006, she showcased the song at her Dancing Diva Sohu Online Concert in Beijing. Later, on August 14, 2006, Tsai performed the song at My FM's 8th Anniversary Magical Music Journey event.

== Track listing ==
- Taiwanese VCD single
1. "Pulchritude" (music video) – 3:44
2. "Pulchritude" (behind-the-scenes)
3. Lux Body Wash TV commercial
4. Lux Body Wash TV commercial (behind-the-scenes)
- Mainland Chinese CD single
1. "Pulchritude" – 3:33

== Credits and personnel ==
- Jolin Tsai – backing vocals
- Adia – backing vocals, backing vocal arrangement
- AJ Chen – recording engineering
- Mega Force Studio – recording and mixing studio
- Keller Wang – mixing engineering

== Release history ==
Release dates and formats for "Pulchritude"
Region	Date	Format(s)	Distributor
Taiwan	June 20, 2006	VCD	Lux
China	September 28, 2006	CD	Lux
