= Magic (Jolin Tsai song) =

Single by Jolin Tsai

from the album Magic
- Language: Mandarin
- Released: February 19, 2003
- Studio: M.E (New Taipei); Morgan (Taipei)
- Genre: Pop
- Length: 3:46
- Label: Sony
- Composers: Edward Chan; Charles Lee
- Lyricist: Issac Chen
- Producer: Bing Wang

Jolin Tsai singles chronology
"The Spirit of Knight" (2002)	"Magic" (2003)	"Warriors in Peace" (2003)

Music video
- "Magic" on YouTube

"Magic" (Chinese: 看我72變; pinyin: Kàn wǒ qī shí èr biàn) is a song by Taiwanese singer Jolin Tsai, featured on her fifth studio album Magic (2003). The track was written by Issac Chen, Edward Chan, and Charles Lee, and produced by Bing Wang. It also served as the theme song for the online game Asgard and was released as a single on February 19, 2003, by Sony.

== Background ==
On September 16, 2002, Tsai revealed that she had completed recording five songs for her upcoming album and would soon continue working on additional material. On December 7, 2002, media outlets reported that the album was expected to be released in January 2003. A listening session organized by Sony on February 12, 2003, invited music professionals like Jamie Hsueh, Paula Ma, and John Yuan to review the new material and discuss the promotional sequence of the songs. The following day, reports confirmed that the album's release date was set for March 7, 2003.

== Composition ==
"Magic" opens with a mysterious and playful prelude, featuring synthesized sounds designed to mimic the traditional Chinese sanxian. Combining elements of disco and hip-hop, the track presents a dynamic rhythm and a strong dance appeal.

== Music video ==
The music video for "Magic" was directed by Kuang Sheng and had a production budget of NT$2 million. It featured detailed computer-generated imagery, with characters from the online game Asgard replacing traditional background dancers and appearing alongside Tsai. The choreography, created by Rambo Lan, focused on intricate hand movements to create a magical and illusion-like visual effect. Tsai appears in four distinct looks in the video: a printed jumpsuit, a cowboy-inspired outfit, a casual equestrian ensemble, and a punk-style costume.

== Commercial performance ==
"Magic" ranked first on UFO Radio's Top 100 Hits of the Year chart on December 26, 2003. On January 12, 2004, it was listed at number 24 on Hit FM Top 100 Singles of 2003.

== Critical reception ==
Tencent News described "Magic" as the defining track of Tsai's early 2000s career, noting that it helped establish her signature dance-pop sound and played a significant role in shaping the contemporary C-pop music scene.

== Live performances ==
Tsai performed "Magic" on March 8, 2003, on TTV's variety show Variety Flagship. She later performed the song at the 14th Golden Melody Awards on August 2, 2003, and on Hunan TV's Music Continued on August 13, 2003. On October 10, 2003, she performed it at the Believe in Taiwan Party, followed by an appearance at the China Anji Huangpu River Source Ecological Culture Festival on November 2, 2003. Tsai also included "Magic" in her performances at the 2003 Asia Super Stars Anti Piracy Concert on November 15, 2003, and the Star Storm Concert on November 30, 2003.

== Credits and personnel ==
- Rashid Lo – guitar
- Paula Ma – backing vocals
- Bing Wang – rapping
- Sean Chen – recording engineering
- Johnny – recording engineering
- M.E Studio – recording studio
- Morgan Studio – recording studio
- Dave Yang – mixing engineering
- Life Studio – mixing studio

== Release history ==
Release dates and formats for "Magic"
Region	Date	Format(s)	Distributor
Taiwan	February 19, 2003	Radio airplay	Sony
