= Taipei Arena =

Sports arena in Songshan, Taipei, Taiwan

- 臺北小巨蛋
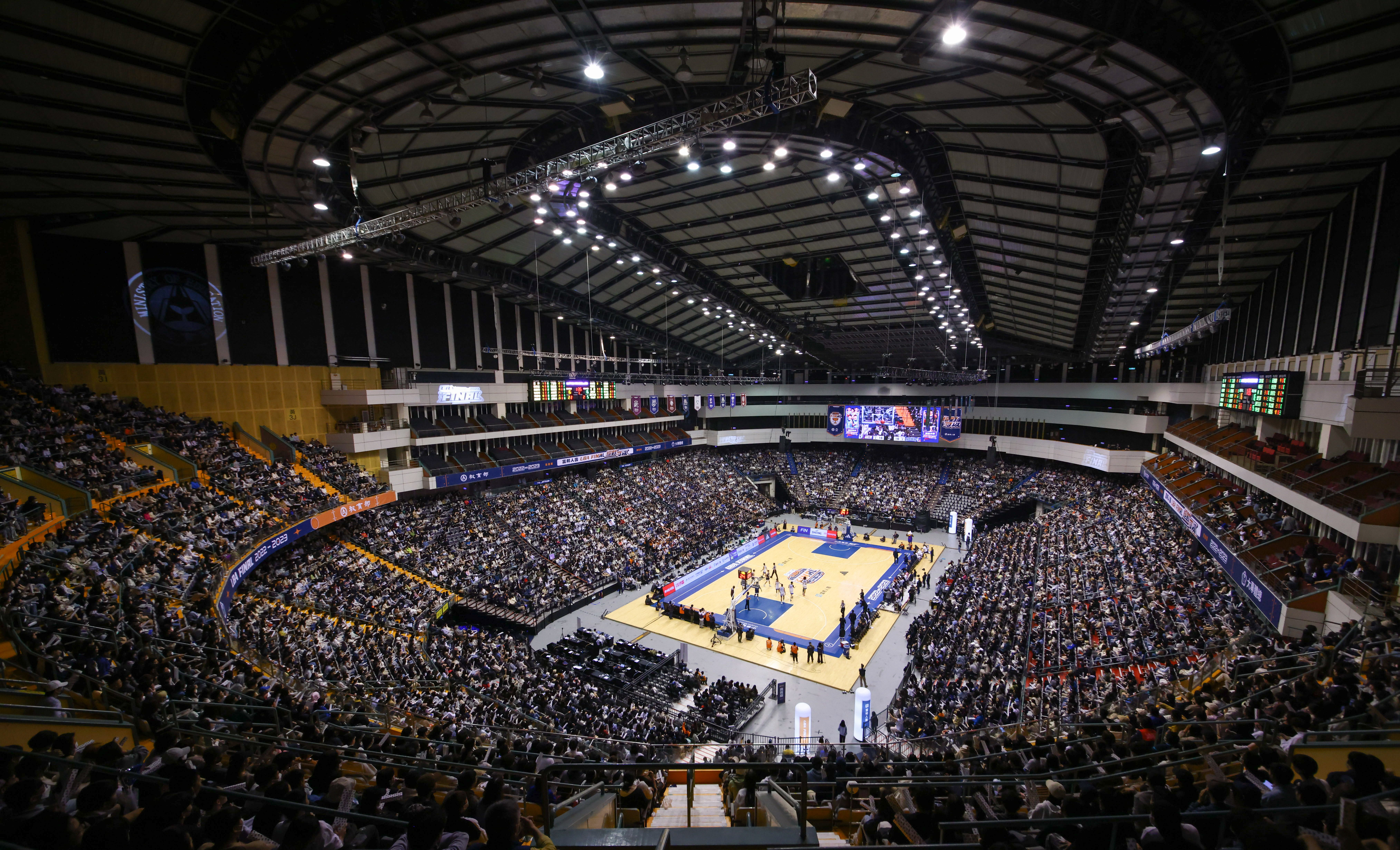
- Taipei Arena in 2023
- Interactive map of Taipei Arena
- Full name: Taipei Multi-purpose Stadium
- Location: Songshan, Taipei, Taiwan
- Coordinates: 25°03′02.55″N 121°33′0″E
- Elevation: 4.06 ft (1.24 m)
- Owner: Taipei City Government
- Operator: Taipei Rapid Transit Corporation (TRTC)
- Capacity: 15,000 (sporting events); 7,000–13,000 (concerts)
- Type: Stadium
- Events: Sporting events, concerts
- Scoreboard: Yes
- Field size: 76 × 41.5 m
- Field shape: Rectangular
- Public transit: Taipei Metro: Taipei Arena

Construction
- Built: December 2001–July 2005
- Opened: 1 December 2005; 20 years ago
- Cost: $4.7 billion TWD
- Architect: Populous
- Builder: BES Engineering Corporation

Website
- english.arena.taipei

Taipei Arena
- Traditional Chinese: 臺北小巨蛋
- Literal meaning: Taipei little big egg
Transcriptions
Standard Mandarin
- Hanyu Pinyin: Táiběi xiǎojùdàn
- Bopomofo: ㄊㄞˊ ㄅㄟˇ ㄒㄧㄠˇ ㄐㄩˋ ㄉㄢˋ
Hakka
- Pha̍k-fa-sṳ: Thòi-pet Séu-khî-than
Southern Min
- Hokkien POJ: Tâi-pak Sió-kū-tàn
- Tâi-lô: Tâi-pak Sió-kū-tàn

The Taipei Arena (Chinese: 臺北小巨蛋) is a multi-purpose stadium in Songshan District, Taipei, Taiwan, and it is operated by the Taipei Rapid Transit Corporation (TRTC). Built in 2005, the large multi-purpose stadium can accommodate major international sport events such as ice skating, ice hockey, gymnastics, handball, basketball, tennis, badminton, table tennis, indoor soccer, boxing, judo, karate, taekwondo and wrestling.

== Building ==
It was designed by Archasia, an architectural firm based in Taipei, and Populous, a Kansas City, Missouri, design and architectural firm specializing in sports venues. It is located at the site of the former Taipei Municipal Baseball Stadium (built in 1958, opened 1959, demolished 2000). The arena was opened on 1 December 2005. The main arena has an adjustable floor space: its minimum floor space is 60m × 30m, and can be extended to 80m × 40m.

The Chinese Taipei Ice Hockey League (CTIHL) plays out of the auxiliary arena, which is a 60m × 30m ice skating rink. The basement now houses two large gas turbine power generators to be used for the surrounding district during emergencies.

== Taipei Arena Sky Screen ==
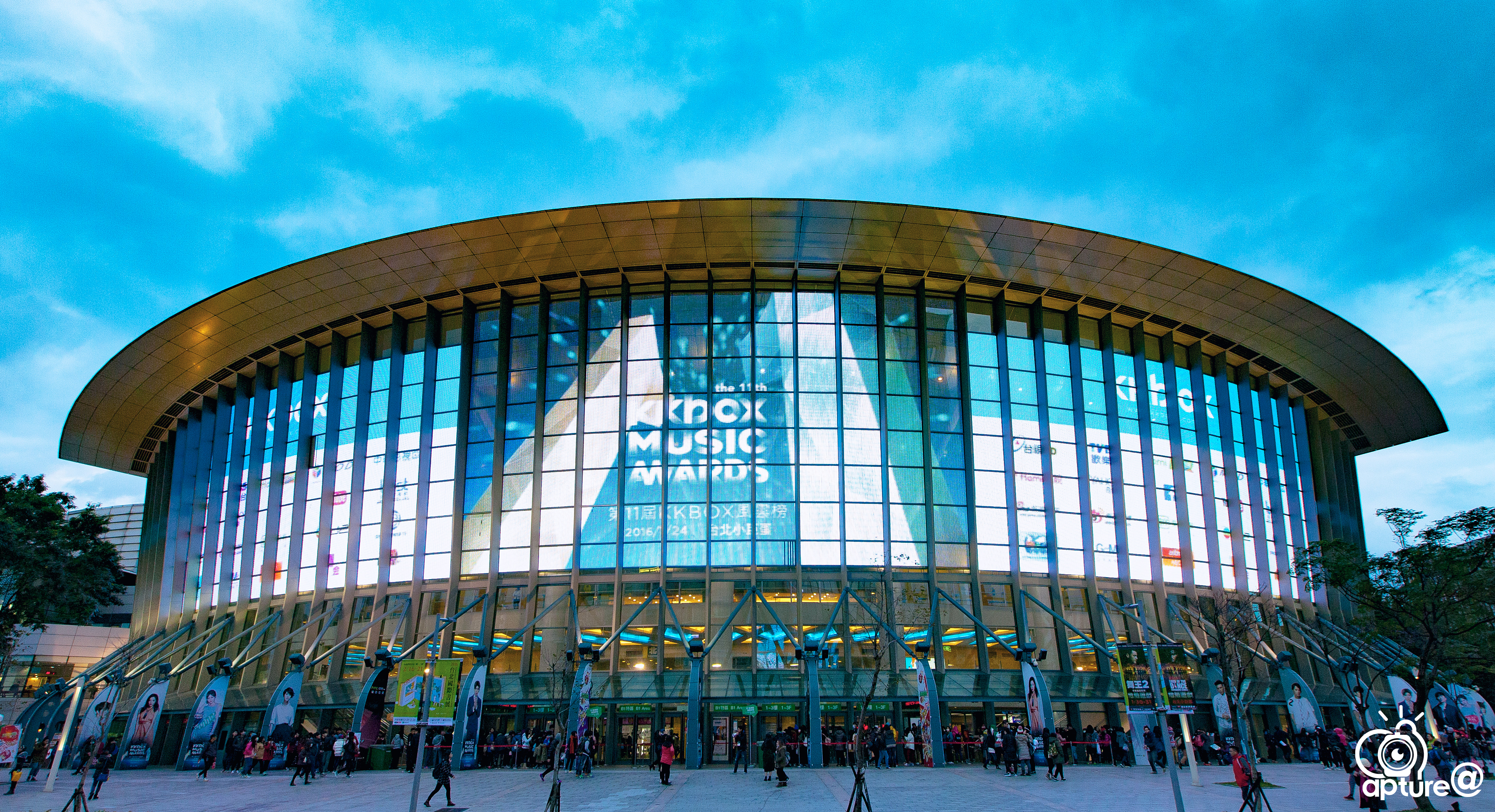
Taipei Arena Sky Screen

Taipei Arena Sky Screen was constructed in December 2006, on the outer glass wall of Taipei Arena. It was the world's largest LED display at that time.

== Transport ==
Taipei Arena is accessible from Taipei Arena Station of the Taipei Metro.

== See also ==
- Taipei Dome
- Taipei Municipal Stadium
- National Taiwan University of Sport
- Sports in Taiwan
