= David Tao discography =

- Tao in 2013
- Studio albums: 8
- Compilation albums: 1
- Live albums: 6
- Soundtrack albums: 1

Taiwanese recording artist David Tao (陶喆) has released seven studio albums, one compilation album, one soundtrack album, and five live albums.

== Studio albums ==
Title	Album details	Peak chart positions			Sales
Title	Album details	TWN	MLY	SGP	Sales
David Tao (陶喆 同名專輯)	Released: December 6, 1997; Label: Shok Records; Formats: CD, cassette, LP	13	—	—	
I'm OK	Released: December 10, 1999; Label: Shok Records; Formats: CD, cassette, digital download	—	8	—	TWN: 500,000
Black Tangerine (黑色柳丁)	Released: August 9, 2002; Label: Shok Records; Formats: CD, cassette, digital download	—	—	1	TWN: 250,000
The Great Leap (太平盛世)	Released: January 21, 2005; Label: EMI Music Taiwan; Formats: CD, cassette, digital download	—	14	2	Asia: 1,200,000; TWN: 120,000
Beautiful (太美麗)	Released: August 4, 2006; Label: EMI Music Taiwan; Formats: CD, cassette, digital download	1	3	—	
Opus 69 (69樂章)	Released: August 21, 2009; Label: Gold Typhoon; Formats: CD, digital download	3	—	—	
Hello Goodbye (再見你好嗎)	Released: June 11, 2013; Label: Seed Music; Formats: CD, digital download	2	—	—	
Stupid Pop Songs (普普愚樂)	Released: April 15, 2025; Label: Great Entertainment; Formats: CD, digital download	1	—	—	

== Compilation albums ==
Title	Album details	Peak chart positions
Title	Album details	MLY
Ultrasound 1997–2003	Released: August 8, 2003; Label: Ecentury; Formats: CD, cassette, digital download	3

== Soundtrack albums ==
name	Album details
Adoration	Released: October 30, 2009; Label: Gold Typhoon; Formats: CD, cassette, digital download

== Live albums ==
name	Album details
Soul Power Live	Released: December 20, 2003; Label: Ecentury; Formats: CD, digital download
Soul Power Live @ Hong Kong	Released: February 17, 2004; Label: Ecentury; Formats: VCD, DVD, digital download
David Tao Love Can World Tour 2006	Released: November 15, 2006; Label: EMI Music Taiwan; Formats: DVD, digital download
Power Of Live	Released: October 26, 2007; Label: EMI Music Taiwan; Formats: CD+DVD, digital download
123 We Are All Wooden Men World Tour Live DVD	Released: March 27, 2009; Label: Gold Typhoon; Formats: DVD, digital download
Live Again The Glamorous Life	Released: June 8, 2017; Label: Seed Music; Formats: Digital download

== Singles ==
Title	Year
"I Believe"	2001
"Two Worlds"	2006
"Live Well"	2008
"Love is Looking at and Leaving"	2014
"Farewell Flight"	2014
"May All Go Well with You"	2015
"Black Tuesday"	2017
"Love is Very Simple" (20th Anniversary Heartfelt Edition)	2017
"Mars Baby"	2017
"Christmas Kiss"	2020
"Everything's Gone (Reimagined)"	2023
"Song For the World"	2023
"Serves You Right"	2023
"I'm Ok (Reimagined)"	2023
"Shining Star"	2024
"Kids"	2024
