= Abe Laboriel Jr. discography =

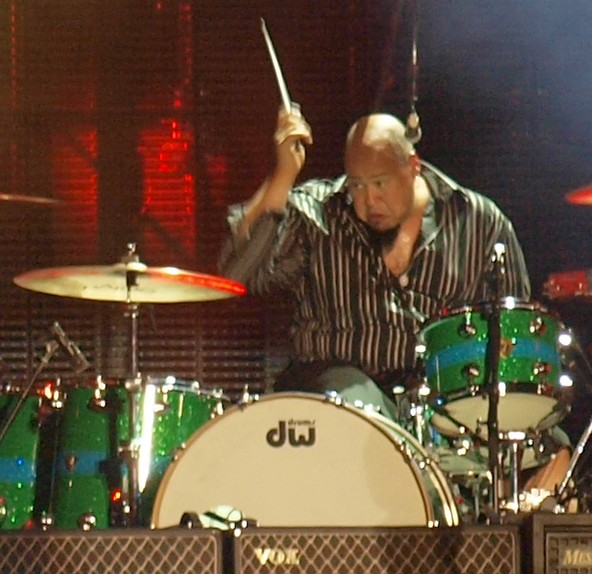
Laboriel performing in 2008

This is the discography of American drummer Abe Laboriel Jr.

== Discography ==
Year	Artist	Album/Track	Instrument(s)
1992	Justo Almario	Heritage	Drums
1993	Abraham Laboriel	Dear Friends	Drums
1993	Dianne Reeves	Art & Survival	Drums
1994	Justo Almario	Justo Almario & Abraham Laboriel	Drums
1994	Big Mountain	Unity	Drums
1995	Jonatha Brooke & the Story	Plumb	Drums, percussion, dumbek, tambourine, shaker, arranger
1995	Abraham Laboriel	Guidim	Drums
1995	Duran Duran	Thank You	Drums
1996	Doyle Bramhall II	Doyle Bramhall II	Drums
1996	For Real	Free	Percussion
1996	Original Motion Picture Soundtrack	The Craft	Drums, percussion
1996	Ednita Nazario	Espíritu Libre	Drums
1997	Jonatha Brooke	10 Cent Wings	Drums, tambourine, shaker, vocals
1997	Mylène Farmer	Live à Bercy	Drums
1997	Victor Feldman	Audiophile	Percussion
1997	David Garfield & Friends	Tribute to Jeff	Drums, tom-tom
1997	Hanson	Middle of Nowhere	Drums
1997	k.d. lang	Drag	Drums
1997	Ringo Starr	Got the Feeling	Drum samples
1997	John Sykes	Loveland	Drums, percussion
1997	The Wilsons	The Wilsons	Drums
1998	Gabriela Anders	Wanting	Drums
1998	Adam Cohen	Adam Cohen	Drums
1998	Dolls Head	Frozen Charlotte	Drum programming, drum loops
1998	Crystal Lewis	Gold	Drums
1998	Rebekah	Remember to Breathe	Drums
1998	Imogen Heap	I Megaphone	Drums
1998	Murmurs	Blender	Drums
1999	Richard Anstey	Aromatic Journey	Drums, percussion
1999	Natalie Cole	Snowfall on the Sahara	Drum loops
1999	Mylène Farmer	Innamoramento	Drums
1999	Meshell Ndegeocello	Bitter	(not stated)
1999	Scritti Politti	Anomie & Bonhomie	Drums
1999	Shelby Starner	From in the Shadows	Drums, percussion
1999	Dave Stewart	Sly Fi	Drums
1999	Jeremy Toback	Another True Fiction	Drums, background vocals
1999	Sylvie Vartan	Irrésistiblement	Drums
1999	Paul Westerberg	Suicane Gratifaction	Drums
1999	Television Movie Soundtrack	Batman Beyond	Drum programming
2000	Fishbone	The Psychotic Friends Nuttwerx	Drums, lo-tech loop
2000	Johnny Hallyday	Sang pour sang	Drums
2000	Gregory James	Traveler	Drum loops
2000	k.d. lang	Invincible Summer	Drums, vocals
2000	Manhattan Transfer	Spirit of St. Louis	Drums, loops, orchestration
2000	Ricky Martin	Sound Loaded	Drums
2000	John McVey	Jigsaw	Drums
2000	Splattercell	Oah	Drums, vocals
2000	Original Motion Picture Soundtrack	Batman Beyond: Return of the Joker	Drum loop
2000	Mylène Farmer	Mylenium Tour	Drums
2001	Chris Botti	Night Sessions	Drums
2001	Chocolate Genius	GodMusic	Producer
2001	Krystal	Me & My Piano	Drums
2001	k.d. lang	Live by Request	Drums
2001	Paul McCartney	Driving Rain	Drums, percussion, electronic percussion, African drums, tambourine, accordion, Roland synthesizer, background vocals
2001	Shakira	Laundry Service	Drums
2001	Various Artists; with Paul McCartney	Concert for New York City	Drums
2002	Meredith Brooks	Bad Bad One	Drums
2002	Vanessa Carlton	Be Not Nobody	Drums
2002	Citizen Cope	Citizen Cope	Drums
2002	David Tao	Black Tangerine	Drums
2002	Dakota Moon	Place to Land	Drums
2002	John Doe	Dim Stars, Bright Sky	Drums
2002	Mylène Farmer	Best of Les Mots	Drums
2002	Jennifer Love Hewitt	BareNaked	Drums
2002	Lamya	Learning from Falling	Drums
2002	Paul McCartney	Back in the U.S.	Drums, percussion, background vocals
2002	Taylor Mesple	Victory Land	Drums, loops
2002	O-Town	O2	Drums
2002	LeAnn Rimes	Twisted Angel	Drums
2002	Will Smith	Born to Reign	Drums
2002	John Rzeznik feat. BBMak	"Always Know Where You Are" on Treasure Planet OST	Drums
2002	Various Artists; with Paul McCartney	Party at the Palace: The Queen's Jubilee Concert (DVD)	Drums
2003	Kelly Clarkson	Thankful	Drums
2003	Fiction Plane	Everything Will Never Be OK	Drums
2003	Jewel	0304	Drums, percussion
2003	Paul McCartney	Back in the World	Drums, percussion, background vocals
2003	Lisa Marie Presley	To Whom It May Concern	Drums, electric drums, guitar
2003	Lucy Woodward	While You Can	Drums
2004	Ashlee Simpson	Autobiography	Drums
2005	David Tao	The Great Leap	Drums
2005	Fiona Apple	Extraordinary Machine	Drums, drum programming
2005	Sheryl Crow	Wildflower	Drums
2005	Paul McCartney	Chaos and Creation in the Backyard	Drums, percussion, vocals
2006	David Tao	Beautiful	Drums
2006	Eric Clapton & JJ Cale	The Road to Escondido	Drums
2007	Avril Lavigne	"Innocence" on The Best Damn Thing	Drums
2007	Emmy Rossum	Inside Out	Drums
2007	Paul McCartney	Memory Almost Full	Drums, vocals
2008	Steve Lukather	Ever Changing Times	Drums
2009	Kate Voegele	A Fine Mess	Drums
2009	Lady Gaga	"Speechless" on The Fame Monster	Drums
2009	Paul McCartney	Amoeba's Secret	Drums, vocals
2009	Paul McCartney	Good Evening New York City	Drums, vocals
2010	Paul McCartney	Live in Los Angeles	Drums, vocals
2013	Paul McCartney	New	Drums, vocals, djembe
2018	RSO	Radio Free America	Drums, percussion
2018	Paul McCartney	Egypt Station	Drums, vocals
2020	Paul McCartney	McCartney III	Drums on one track
2021	Jerry Cantrell	Brighten	Drums
2025	David Tao	Stupid Pop Songs	Drums
