= Marry Me Today =

Single by David Tao and Jolin Tsai

from the album Beautiful
- Language: Mandarin
- Released: August 17, 2006
- Genre: pop
- Length: 4:32
- Label: ECentury
- Composer: David Tao
- Lyricists: David Tao; Wawa Chen
- Producer: David Tao

David Tao singles chronology
"Beautiful" (2006)	"Marry Me Today" (2006)	"Free" (2007)

Jolin Tsai singles chronology
"Dancing Diva" (2006)	"Marry Me Today" (2006)	"Dancing Forever" (2006)

Music video
- "Marry Me Today" on YouTube

"Marry Me Today" (Chinese: 今天妳要嫁給我; pinyin: Jīntiān nǐ yào jià gěi wǒ) is a song by Taiwanese singers David Tao and Jolin Tsai, featured on David Tao's fifth studio album Beautiful (2006). It was written by David Tao and Wawa Chen, with production handled by David Tao. It was issued on August 17, 2006, by ECentury as the second single from Beautiful. The song received the Song of the Year award at the 18th Golden Melody Awards.

== Background and release ==
On July 16, 2006, Tao announced that his new album was nearing release and revealed that its main theme would focus on romance. Five days later, on July 21, EMI staff confirmed that the album Beautiful would include a duet with Tsai. The album was officially released on August 4, 2006, featuring the track "Marry Me Today".

== Composition ==
The song combines a catchy folk melody with lively harmonica accompaniment, cleverly incorporating the "Wedding March" and sounds of joyful laughter symbolizing a happy family. The lyrics skillfully use the imagery of changing seasons to depict the journey of a couple from romance to marriage, while adapting the priest's wedding vows into a rap segment.

On August 20, 2006, during an interview with Southern Metropolis Daily, Tao revealed that the song was originally written as a solo piece. However, during the lyric-writing process, he decided to turn it into a duet, featuring alternating verses sung by a female vocalist and himself, with harmonized choruses and a rap section simulating the officiating priest. This arrangement made the song more dynamic and engaging. He also explained that collaborating with Tsai was not a marketing ploy by the record company; rather, the decision was based on their age difference and differing perspectives on marriage, which added depth and resonance to the song.

== Music video ==
On August 4, 2006, Tao and Tsai filmed the music video for "Marry Me Today" at Grace Hill in Taipei's Neihu District and the Maze Garden in Xinsheng Park, Zhongshan District. Directed by Tony Lin, the video was released on August 17, 2006.

== Commercial performance ==
The song was ranked number one on Taiwan's Hit FM Top 100 Singles of the Year in 2006.

== Critical reception ==
China News Service praised "Marry Me Today" for showcasing Tao's strengths as a composer, calling it a polished pop masterpiece. The news agency also noted that the duet between Tao and Tsai blends Jiangnan folk melodies with American-style rhythms, creating a perfectly balanced romantic atmosphere. Huashang Morning Post highlighted the collaboration as a fusion between a singer-songwriter and a pop idol, with the upbeat R&B vibe conveying joyful notes. The rap segment during the interlude symbolizes happiness, and the song concludes cleverly by incorporating the "Wedding March", bringing the romantic journey to a graceful close. 3C Music's review commented that Tsai's vocal performance is steady and well-executed, with a thoughtful arrangement. The conversion of the priest's dialogue into rap in the latter part is well matched and effective. Sohu Entertainment regarded the song as the album's commercial weapon, suggesting that the collaboration between Tao and Tsai was largely a marketing strategy designed to generate buzz, characterizing it as a form of star-studded formalism.

== Accolades ==
The song received several accolades, including Top 10 Mandarin Songs of the Year at the 2006 Canadian Chinese Pop Music Awards, Top 10 Mandarin Songs and Most Loved Song by Listeners at the 2007 Hito Music Awards, Most Popular Duet Song at the 1st Family Music Awards, Best Song of the Year at the 2006 Music Radio China Top Chart Awards, Top 10 Singles of 2006 honored by Chinese Musicians Exchange Association, Song of the Year at the 18th Golden Melody Awards, Most Popular Duet Song at the 7th Global Chinese Music Awards, and Best Selling Duet Song of the Year at the 2007 Migu Music Awards.

== Live performances ==
On February 3, 2007, Tao and Tsai performed the song "Marry Me Today" together at the 2007 Hito Music Awards. The following day, on February 4, 2007, they also performed the song at the Windows Vista Wow Concert. On February 17, the duo appeared on CCTV New Year's Gala, where they once again performed "Marry Me Today". On April 26, 2007, they performed the song at the 2nd Expo Central China Concert. On June 29, 2007, they performed the song at the 2006 Music Radio China Top Chart Awards. On January 11, 2008, Tao and Tsai performed the song at the M Conference. On April 28, 2008, they appeared at the 4th China International Cartoon & Animation Festival Opening Ceremony and performed "Marry Me Today".

== Anecdote ==
In the 2016 U.S. presidential election, Donald Trump was elected president. Some netizens humorously interpreted the lyrics "DT in the house" from the song "Marry Me Today"—where "DT" refers to David Tao—as a prediction of Donald Trump's victory. They playfully dubbed Jolin Tsai a prophet, commenting, "We always suspected Trump would win the U.S. election, after all, the mysterious power from the East—Jolin Tsai had already predicted: DT (Donald Trump) in the house (White House)."

== Personnel ==
- David Tao – instrumental performance and arrangement
- Dino Soldo – harmonica
- Andrew Chu – recording engineer
- Firehouse Recording Studios – recording studio
- Platinum Recording Studios – recording studio
- Milton Gufierrez Ruezga – recording assistant
- Jen Fei-hsiang – recording assistant
- Roberts Lo – recording assistant
- Edward Yee – recording assistant
- Mick Guzaski – mixing engineer
- Barking Doctor Recording – mixing studio
- Tom Bender – mixing assistant

== Release history ==
Release dates and formats for "Marry Me Today"
Region	Date	Format	Distributor
China	August 17, 2006	Radio airplay	ECentury

== See also ==
- "Marry Me Today" (Live at the 2007 CCTV New Year's Gala) on YouTube
