= Dancing Forever =

2006 compilation album by Jolin Tsai

Compilation album by Jolin Tsai
- Released: September 29, 2006
- Genres: Pop; dance
- Length: 1:42:06
- Labels: EMI; Mars
- Producers: Adia; Peter Lee; David Tao; Wu Bai; Paul Lee

Jolin Tsai chronology
Dancing Diva (2006)	Dancing Forever (2006)	Favorite (2006)

Singles from Dancing Forever
- 1. "Dancing Forever" Released: September 13, 2006

Dancing Forever (Chinese: 唯舞獨尊) is a compilation album by Taiwanese singer Jolin Tsai, released on September 29, 2006, by EMI. The album features seven new songs, six remixed tracks, and live performances from the Pulchritude Concert held on July 1, 2006, at the Kaohsiung Cultural Center. The track "Marry Me Today" won the Song of the Year award at the 18th Golden Melody Awards.

== Background and development ==
On May 31, 2006, Tsai's manager, Howard Chiang, revealed plans for a new concert tour scheduled for the second half of the year. On July 17, 2006, Tsai announced that her second world tour, the Dancing Forever World Tour, would commence on September 15 at the Hong Kong Coliseum. On August 20, 2006, media reports revealed that Tsai had recorded the tour's theme song, "Dancing Forever", and had already filmed its music video.

On August 25, 2006, it was reported that Tsai would release a compilation album titled Dancing Forever in September, featuring covers of Faye Wong's "Missing" and Sandy Lam's "Heard That Love's Ever Been Back", both artists whom Tsai regards as her musical idols. On August 30, 2006, media also reported that the album would include a cover of Yeh Chi-tien's "Dare to Go to the Cemetery", produced by Wu Bai. On September 7, 2006, Tsai confirmed the album's release date as September 29.

== Writing and recording ==
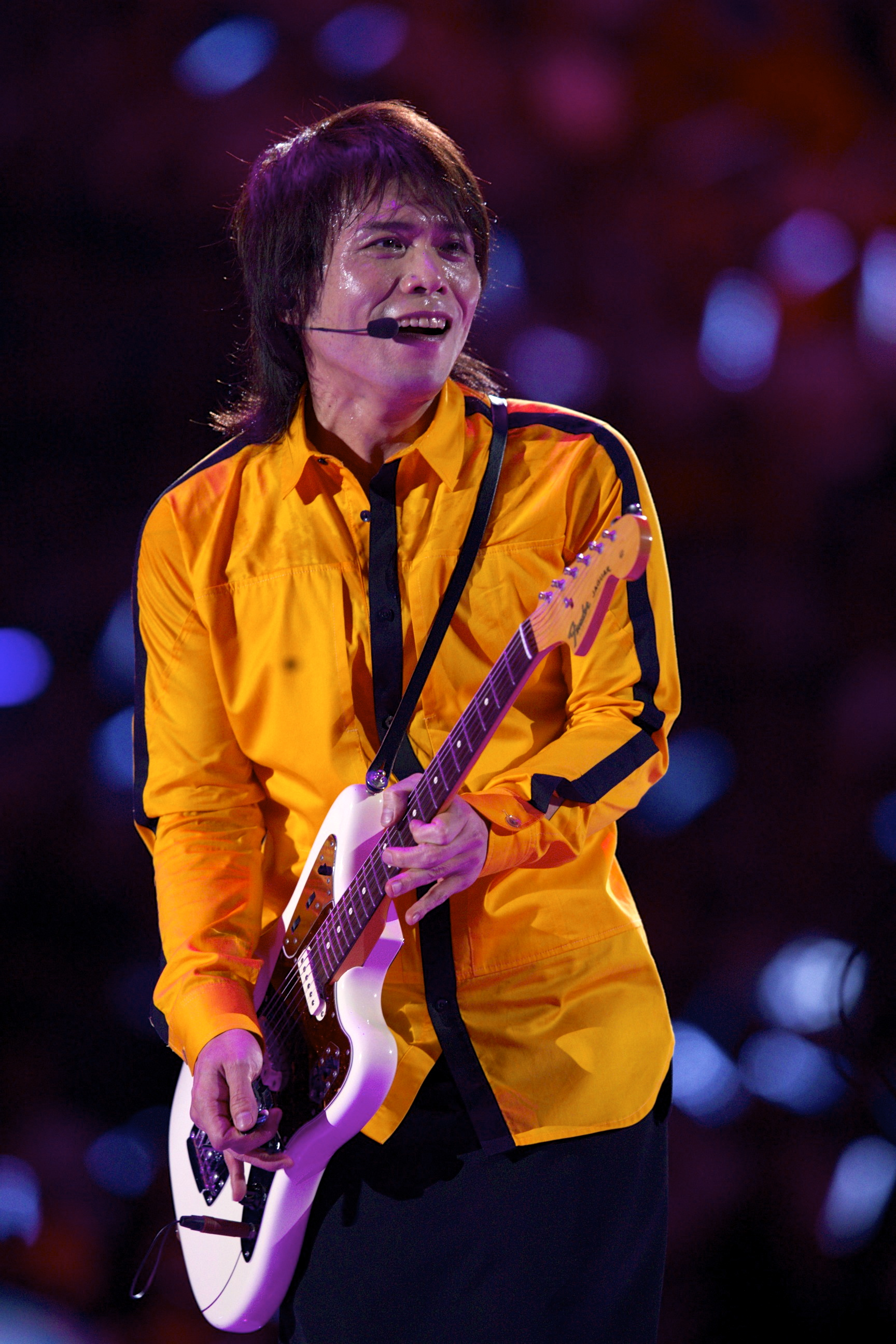
David Tao (left) and Wu Bai (right), two collaborators on the album

The lead single, "Dancing Forever", opens with an intense, heavy-beat intro that creates a mysterious and grounded atmosphere. Its catchy lyrics are designed to appeal to a younger audience's love for vibrant, high-energy sounds. "Missing", originally by Faye Wong, is reinterpreted by Tsai with a subtly melancholic tone, capturing memories she holds dear. "Dare to Go to the Cemetery"—a cover of Yeh Chi-tien's classic—features a reimagined arrangement in a distinctly Taiwanese electronic dance style. Tsai delivers the song with a playful vocal approach, while the fast tempo adds a layer of challenge to the articulation of Taiwanese Hokkien lyrics.

"Heard That Love's Ever Been Back", originally performed by Sandy Lam, is introduced with a heartfelt spoken passage by Lam herself. Tsai's vocals intertwine with this emotional prelude, guiding listeners through the bittersweet and multifaceted nature of love. The track "Rival in Love" is a fast-paced and alluring dance number. "Marry Me Today", a lighthearted and romantic duet between Tsai and David Tao, exudes charm and warmth. The Cantonese version of Pretence conveys the song's emotional helplessness with even greater depth and resonance.

== Artwork ==
On the album cover, Tsai strikes an almost physically impossible yoga pose atop a large, custom-made steel ring shaped like the letter "J". Tsai remarked, "I had to hold a yoga-like pose on this oversized J-shaped steel ring, which was a complete challenge to the limits of the human body. My legs had to stay hooked onto the ring for four hours, and after the shoot, I found them covered in bruises."

== Release and promotion ==
On September 18, 2006, Tsai held a press conference in Taipei, Taiwan, to promote the release of her album. Later that month, on September 29, she hosted a promotional event in Taipei to further support the album’s launch.

=== Single and music videos ===
On August 17, 2006, David Tao and Tsai released the music video for their duet "Marry Me Today", directed by Tony Lin. On September 13, 2006, Tsai released the single "Dancing Forever". The following day, on September 16, she premiered the music video for "Dancing Forever", directed by Jeff Chang. In the video, Tsai portrays a museum mannequin who breaks out of a glass display case, transforming into a seductive socialite, and later appears in a red hip-hop tracksuit, dancing alongside a group of dancers.

On October 2, Tsai released the music video for "Missing", directed by Marlboro Lai. On October 16, 2006, she released the video for "Dare to Go to the Cemetery", also directed by Marlboro Lai. The music video for "Heard That Love's Ever Been Back" was likewise directed by Marlboro Lai.

=== Live performances ===
On November 17, 2006, Tsai appeared on the variety show Let's Shake It on Dragon TV, where she performed "Dancing Forever". On February 3, 2007, she attended the 2007 Hito Music Awards, where she performed "Marry Me Today" with David Tao. The following day, on February 4, Tsai participated in the Windows Vista Wow Concert, performing "Heard That Love's Ever Been Back" and "Dancing Forever", and also joined David Tao for a duet of "Marry Me Today".

On February 17, 2007, Tsai performed "Marry Me Today" with David Tao again on the CCTV New Year's Gala. On April 26, 2007, she appeared at the 2nd Expo Central China Concert, where she performed "Marry Me Today" with Tao. On June 29, 2007, Tsai attended the 2006 Music Radio China Top Chart Awards, where she once again performed "Marry Me Today" with David Tao. On November 1, 2007, she participated in the Our Chinese Heart, where she performed "Dancing Forever".

On January 11, 2008, Tsai performed "Dancing Forever" and "Marry Me Today" with David Tao at the M Conference. On April 28, 2008, she took part in the 4th China International Cartoon & Animation Festival Opening Ceremony, where she performed "Dancing Forever" and "Marry Me Today" alongside Tao.

== Commercial performance ==
On October 28, 2006, Sam Chen of EMI revealed that the album had sold over 50,000 copies in Taiwan. In its debut week, the album topped the weekly sales charts of major Taiwanese retailers, including G-Music and Five Music. It later ranked 15th on G-Music's annual sales chart for 2006.

Additionally, the song "Dancing Forever" placed number 46 on Taiwan's Hit FM Top 100 Singles of 2006, while "Marry Me Today" claimed the number one spot on the same chart.

== Critical reception ==
Tencent Entertainment commented that, compared to J9 (2004) released during Tsai's time with Sony, this album featured seven brand-new tracks along with a striking visual presentation. The high promotional budget made it the most costly remix album in her discography. Released shortly after the success of Dancing Diva (2006), the album debuted at number one on Taiwan’s two major sales charts in its first week, making it the first remix album in Taiwanese music history to achieve such commercial success.

== Accolades ==
On January 18, 2007, the song "Marry Me Today" was awarded one of the Top 10 Most Popular Mandarin Songs of the Year in the 2006 Canadian Chinese Pop Music Awards. On February 3, 2007, "Marry Me Today" won two awards at the Hito Music Awards: Top 10 Mandarin Songs of the Year and Listener's Favorite Song. On February 25, 2007, "Marry Me Today" received the Most Popular Duet Song award at the inaugural Family Music Awards. On May 3, 2007, "Marry Me Today" was recognized as one of the Top 10 Singles of the Year by the Chinese Musicians Exchange Association.

On June 16, 2007, "Marry Me Today" won the Song of the Year award at the 18th Golden Melody Awards. On June 29, 2007, "Marry Me Today" was named the Top Songs of the Year at the 2006 Music Radio China Top Chart Awards. On October 7, 2007, "Marry Me Today" received the Most Popular Duet Song award at the 7th Global Chinese Music Awards. On January 13, 2008, "Marry Me Today" won the Best Selling Duet Song award at the 2nd Migu Music Awards.

== Track listing ==
Dancing Forever – CD 1
No.	Title	Lyrics	Music	Producer(s)	Length
1.	"Dancing Forever" (唯舞獨尊)	Issac Chen	Roger Olsson; Klas Johan Wahl; Nick Whitecross	Adia	4:06
2.	"Rival in Love" (情逢敵手)	Gino Chen	Toby Baker; Paul Borg; Debbie French; Gary Poole	Adia	3:01
3.	"Missing" (懷念)	Wyman Wong	Simon Raymonde; Elizabeth Fraser; Robin Guthrie	Peter Lee	3:38
4.	"Heard That Love's Ever Been Back" (聽說愛情回來過)	Peter Lee	Peter Lee	Peter Lee	5:08
5.	"Marry Me Today" (今天妳要嫁給我)	David Tao; Wawa Chen	David Tao	David Tao	4:32
6.	"Dare to Go to the Cemetery" (墓仔埔也敢去)	Kuo Ta-cheng	Tadashi Yoshida	Wu Bai	4:14
7.	"Pretence" (Cantonese version)	Keith Chan	Howard Ku	Paul Lee	5:18
Total length:					29:57

Dancing Forever – CD 2
No.	Title	Lyrics	Music	Remixer(s)	Length
1.	"Dancing Diva" (765 Spinning Acid House mix)	Issac Chen	Miriam Nervo; Olivia Nervo; Greg Kurstin	DJ M@rio; Zain Jen	7:34
2.	"Mr. Q" (All Night Party remixed by DJ Submarine)	Issac Chen	Miriam Nervo; Olivia Nervo; Ben Thomas; Dele Ladimeji	DJ Submarine	5:27
3.	"Dancing Diva" (Breakdown Stomp mix)	Issac Chen	Miriam Nervo; Olivia Nervo; Greg Kurstin	DJ Code	5:26
4.	"Attraction of Sexy Lips" (Hit Hot Vibration mix)	Sunny Lee	Terry Lee	DJ C	7:21
5.	"Mr. Q" (Quicy Drum N Bass remix)	Issac Chen	Miriam Nervo; Olivia Nervo; Ben Thomas; Dele Ladimeji	Oscar	5:14
6.	"Dancing Diva" (Orientalism mix)	Issac Chen	Miriam Nervo; Olivia Nervo; Greg Kurstin	DJ Point; DJ Phil	6:38
Total length:					37:40

Dancing Forever – DVD
No.	Title	Lyrics	Music	Length
1.	"Pulchritude" (live video)	Luke Tsui	Lars Quang; Thea Winkelmann	3:29
2.	"Attraction of Sexy Lips" (live video)	Sunny Lee	Terry Lee	3:09
3.	"Nice Guy" (live video)	Luke Tsui	Stanley Huang	3:18
4.	"Sound Wave" (live video)	Stanley Huang	Stanley Huang	3:28
5.	"Pretence" (live video)	Howard Chiang	Howard Ku	5:07
6.	"The Finale" (live video)	Ashin	Peter Lee	4:32
7.	"Mr. Q" (live video)	Issac Chen	Miriam Nervo; Olivia Nervo; Ben Thomas; Dele Ladimeji	4:03
8.	"Dancing Diva" (live video)	Issac Chen	Miriam Nervo; Olivia Nervo; Greg Kurstin	3:04
9.	"A Wonder in Madrid" (live video)	Alang Huang	Hagen Troy	4:19
Total length:				34:29

== Charts ==
=== Weekly charts ===
Chart (2006)	Peak position
Malaysian Chinese Albums (RIM)	1

== Release history ==
Region	Date	Format(s)	Distributor
Various	September 29, 2006	Streaming	Mars
China	September 29, 2006	2CD; cassette	Push Typhoon
Malaysia	September 29, 2006	2CD+VCD	EMI
Taiwan	September 29, 2006	2CD+DVD	EMI
