= John McVeigh =

John McVeigh may refer to:

- John McVeigh (Canadian football) (1925–2008), played for the Edmonton Eskimos
- John McVeigh (footballer) (born 1957), Scottish footballer
- John McVeigh (linebacker) (born 1962), American football player
- John McVeigh (politician), Australian politician
- John J. McVeigh (1920–1944), American soldier and Medal of Honor recipient

== See also ==
- John McVay (disambiguation)
- John McVey (born 1959), American singer-songwriter
