= Ultrasound 1997–2003 =

Compilation album by David Tao
- Released: 8 August 2003
- Genre: Mandopop, R&B
- Length: 47:48
- Language: Mandarin
- Label: EMI Music Taiwan

David Tao chronology
Black Tangerine 黑色柳丁 (2002)	Ultrasound 1997–2003 (2003)	The Great Leap 太平盛世 (2005)

Ultrasound 1997–2003 (Chinese: 樂之路) is the first compilation album by Taiwanese Mandopop singer-songwriter David Tao. It was released on 8 August 2003 by EMI Music Taiwan. It features four new tracks as well as 11 previously released tracks, from his debut album, David Tao in 1997 to his third album Black Tangerine in 2003.

The track "今天没回家" (Shanghaied) is listed at number 6 on Hit Fm Taiwan's Hit Fm Annual Top 100 Singles Chart (Hit-Fm年度百首單曲) for 2003.

== Track listing ==
All music is composed by David Tao.

CD1
No.	Title	Lyrics	Length
1.	"Shanghaied" (今天沒回家)	Wawa
2.	"Bastard" (王八蛋; from I'm OK, 1999)	David Tao, Wawa
3.	"Regular Friends" (普通朋友; from I'm OK, 1999)	David Tao, Wawa
4.	"Small Town Girl" (小鎮姑娘; from I'm OK, 1999)	David Tao
5.	"Blue Moon" (沙灘; from David Tao, 1997)	Wawa
6.	"Airport in 10:30" (飛機場的10:30; from David Tao, 1997)	David Tao, Wawa
7.	"My Anata"	David Tao, Wawa
8.	"I Like It" (我喜歡)	Wawa
9.	"Close to You" (天天from I'm OK, 1999)	David Tao
10.	"Melody" (from Black Tangerine, 2002)	David Tao, Wawa
11.	"Rain" (找自己; from I'm OK, 1999)	陶喆
12.	"Season of Loneliness" (寂寞的季節)	Wawa
13.	"Black Tangerine" (黑色柳丁; from Black Tangerine, 2002)	David Tao
14.	"I Love You" (愛，很簡單; from David Tao, 1997)	Wawa
15.	"Runaway"	David Tao, Wawa

CD2
No.	Title	Lyrics	Length
1.	"Close to You (2003 Version)"	Wawa
2.	"Airport in 10:30 (Original Demo)"	David Tao
3.	"Black Tangerine (Original Voice Recorder Ideas)"	David Tao
4.	"Blue Moon (A Cappella Demo Version)"	David
5.	"I Like It (Ballad Version)"	Wawa
6.	"Blue Moon (Guitar Version)"	Wawa
7.	"Regular Friends (Rehearsal With Bruce Watson)"	David Tao, Wawa
8.	"I Love You (Original 1993 English Demo)"	David Tao
