= Sharon Kwan =

American singer

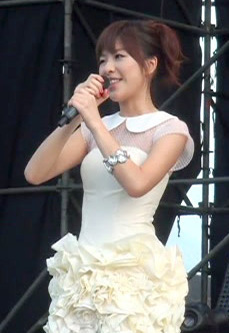
- Sharon Kwan in 2012
- Born: October 12, 1995 (age 30); Los Angeles, California, U.S.
- Occupations: Singer, actor
- Years active: 2011–present

Chinese name
- Traditional Chinese: 關詩敏
- Simplified Chinese: 关诗敏
Transcriptions
- Musical career
- Origin: United States
- Genres: Mandopop, R&B
- Instrument: Vocals
- Label: Seed Music (2011–present)
- Website: Sharon Kwan Official Fanclub

Sharon Kwan (traditional Chinese: 關詩敏; simplified Chinese: 关诗敏, born October 12, 1995) is a Chinese American Mandopop singer. In June 2011, Sharon participated in the first season of Taiwan's China Television (CTV)'s (中視) star search show, Chinese Million Star 1 (華人星光大道), which was the Taiwanese equivalence of American Idol and won the overall champion in January 2012. She released her first album in August of that year, titled Home Girl, and became the first female student of Taiwanese Golden Melody Award-winning singer-songwriter David Tao. In 2015, Sharon took part in the fourth season of the Chinese talent show The Voice of China. She ended up being placed in the top four in team Jay Chou.

== Biography ==
=== Early years ===
Sharon was born in Los Angeles, California to parents of Cantonese origin, and currently stays in Taiwan. Her interest in pursuing Chinese culture and music led her to move to China in 2002 to study, and attended elementary school in the Shanghai Conservatory of Music. She specialized in Erhu because of her love for the Twelve Girls Band who played traditional Chinese instruments. She moved back to America in 2008.

At the age of 14, she developed an interest in Mandopop and Kpop and started recording covers of Mandarin and Korean songs. As her videos gained popularity and garnered numerous views, she decided to pursue vocal lessons with Singer-Songwriter/Producer C.J. Emmons in Los Angeles. Over the course of two years of training, she performed at various restaurants and took part in prominent reality-singing competitions. In April 2010, she participated in the fifth season of Super Idol 5 and advanced to the top 25. Later, in September 2010, she joined the eighth season of ETTV Top Idol and emerged as one of the final 10 contestants.

=== Rise to fame ===
On May 14, 2011, Sharon took part in the audition for Taiwanese reality-singing show Chinese Million Star that was held in Los Angeles, and was invited to Taiwan to take part in the competition. She then moved to Taiwan in June 2011 with her mother and sister, and successfully passed many rounds of the competition. She was the youngest contestant of the top 6, but was able to continually make personal breakthroughs in her performances, and obtained high affirmations from influential singers and songwriters like Liu Chia-chang and Lo Ta-yu. Her popularity rose quickly, and in a short time her competition videos attracted more than 10 million views on the web. Finally, her talents and charisma on stage made her the cream of the crop, and on January 8, 2012, won the overall champion of the first season of the competition. At the age of 16, she was the youngest champion of the Million Star competitions.

One of the judges of the contest, David Tao, a well-known figure in the Mandopop industry, saw her potential as a superstar, and immediately signed her under his company Great Entertainment. She officially became his first female student.

In March and April 2012, Sharon returned to Los Angeles to take her exams, and received invitations from Jason Chen and Gerald Ko, who were famous singers on the internet. They performed covers of various famous hits, and the songs attracted more than 2 million views in half a year. Her vocal skills received widespread acclaim.

=== Debut and career (2012–present) ===
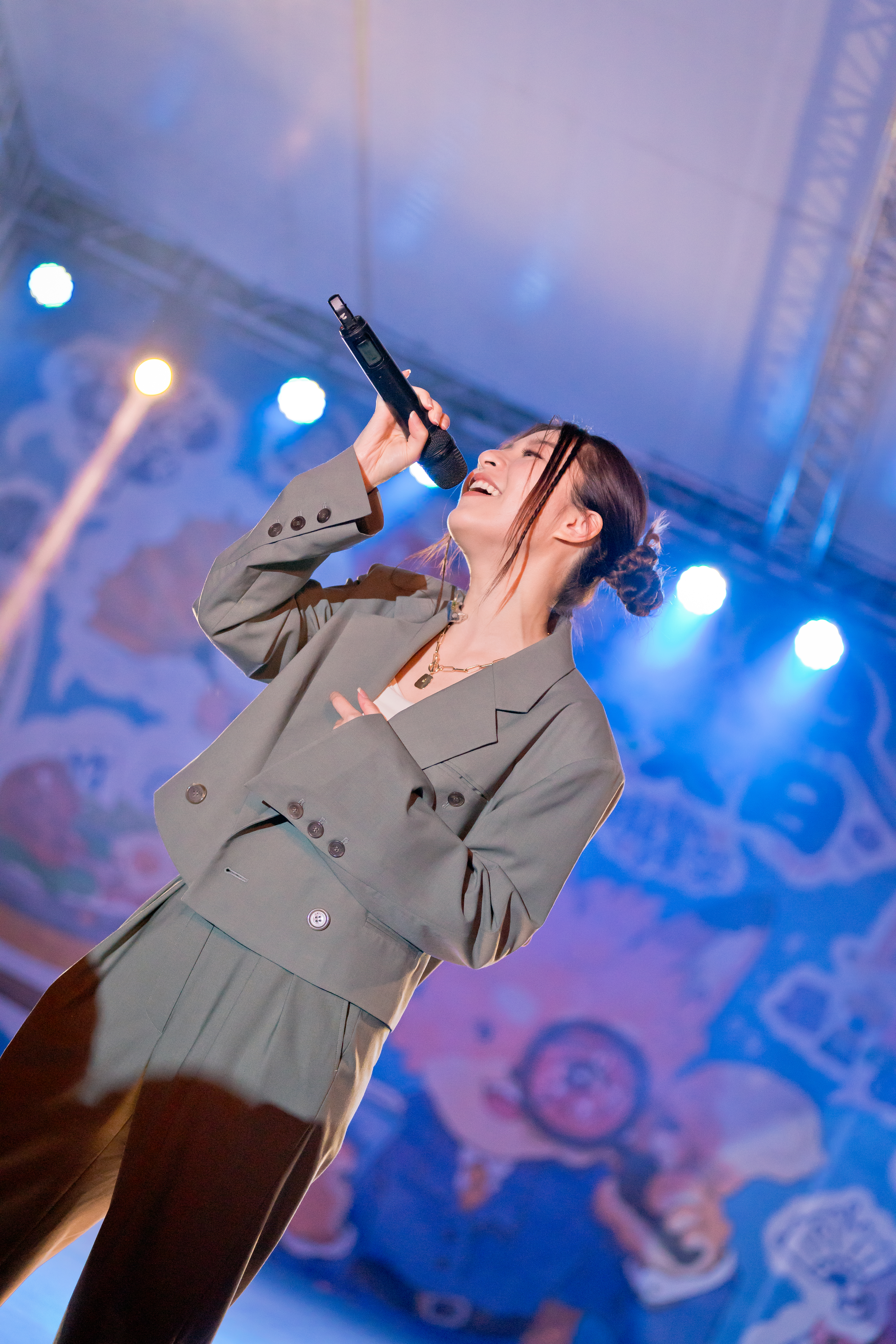
Kwan in 2022

Sharon was signed to Gin Star Entertainment in 2012, and became an artiste under Gin Star Entertainment, Great Entertainment and Seed Music. Preparations for her debut album immediately began, and on August 24, 2012, just 7 months after her competition, she released her first album titled "Home Girl".

"Home Girl" was produced personally by David Tao. He believed that electronic K-pop music or lyrical mandarin songs were not the most suitable for Sharon's age and style. Hence he searched for a special team of Golden Melody Award-winning producers and songwriters, and produced an album that created her own music style.

In 2015, she auditioned in the 4th season of "The Voice of China" with the Song 晴天, originally sung by Jay Chou. She passed the blind audition with a two chair turn and was on Team Jay. Sharon was selected in Team Jay's final four but was later eliminated by Team Na Ying's Gary Sun.

== Discography ==
=== Albums ===
Released	Name	Label	Format	ref
August 24, 2012	Home Girl (關在家)	Seed Music	Studio album	
August 4, 2016	Blossom (綻放2.0)	Seed Music	Studio album	
August 13, 2020	MASTERPIECE	AsiaMuse Entertainment	Studio album	

=== Singles ===
Year	Song / EP	Comments
2011 June	"Fan Hang"	Sharon's first self-recorded single, on sale on iTunes in 2011. Music by Joe Chao, lyrics by Crystal Wawa Xie
2013 January	"Share the Love"	The theme song of a mini movie created by Taiwan's Ministry of Finance for charity
2013 June	"All for Joy"	Theme song for a BMW campaign in the 2012 Olympics, duet with David Tao and recorded in his 2013 album Hello Goodbye
2013 June	"Time to Say Goodbye"	Ending theme of Full House Take 2. Duet with David Tao and recorded in his 2013 album Hello Goodbye
2016 January	"The Wind's Love (风之恋)"	Part of soundtrack for 2016 Chinese drama, Legend of Nine Tails Fox

=== Concerts ===
Her first concert, 'Home Party" was held on November 2, 2012, at Riverside Live House in Taipei. Besides performing songs from her album, she also did covers of classic songs by Teresa Teng, Faye Wong and many more.

=== Live performances ===
2011

- December 31, 2011, Countdown concert held in Yes Plaza in Rowland Heights, CA.

2012

- April 28, 2012 [E-DA Super Asia Music Festival] Sharon participated in this festival held in E-DA World in Kaohsiung, together with other superstars from Taiwan, Japan and Korea.
- November 11, 2012 [Exit Music Festival] Held in Luzhou Station in Luzhou, New Taipei, Taiwan.
- November 24, 2012, Christmas Event held in Gongguan, Taipei.
- December 30, 2012, Year end concert held in Keelung.
- December 31, 2012 Hsinchu County countdown concert.

2013

- February 14, 2013 [2013 New Taipei City Pingxi Sky Lantern Festival].
- April 18, 2013 [17th Channel V Chinese Music Awards]
- May 18, 2013 [David Tao The Glamorous Life World Tour- Shanghai] Performance guest.
- June 1, 2013 [David Tao The Glamorous Life World Tour- Nanjing] Performance guest.
- June 29, 2013 [David Tao The Glamorous Life World Tour- Chengdu] Performance guest.
- July 20, 2013 [David Tao The Glamorous Life World Tour- Macau] Performance guest.
- August 10, 2013 [Daphne Extreme Live Concert].
- September 7, 2013 [David Tao The Glamorous Life World Tour- Beijing] Performance guest.
- October 1, 2013 [David Tao The Glamorous Life World Tour- Shenzhen] Performance guest
- October 25, 2013 [48th Golden Bell Awards]
- November 2, 2013 [David Tao The Glamorous Life World Tour- Nanning] Performance guest.
- November 15, 2013 [David Tao The Glamorous Life World Tour- Fuzhou] Performance guest.
- January 18, 2014 [David Tao The Glamorous Life World Tour- Genting Highlands, Malaysia] Performance guest.

== Filmography ==
=== Short films ===
2012

- June 2012 Samsung Galaxy SIII (preview)
- July 2013 Samsung Galaxy SIII (series of 6 clips)

=== TV drama ===
Year	Channel	Name	Character
2013	China Television	Dragon Gate	Ai Xin

== Awards ==
2012

- December 2012 [20th Chinese Music Chart] Nominated for Most Popular New Artiste, Best New Artiste awards.

2013

- January 2013 [Top Star Awards] Nominated for Taiwan and Hong Kong Most Popular New Artiste.
- March 2013 [2013 HITO Music Awards] Nominated for Most Popular New Artiste.
