= John McVay (disambiguation) =

John McVay (1931–2022) was an American football coach and executive.

John McVay may also refer to:

- John McVay (producer) (born 1960), British film and television producer

== See also ==
- John McVeigh (disambiguation)
- John McVey (born 1959), American singer-songwriter
