= Peggy Hsu =

Peggy Hsu 許哲珮
- Peggy Hsu performing live in 2026

Background information
- Born: 2 February 1981; Taipei, Taiwan
- Genres: Mandopop, independent music
- Occupations: Singer-songwriter, songwriter, record producer
- Years active: 2001–present
- Label: Ice Studio
- Website: www.peggyhsu.com

Peggy Hsu (Chinese: 許哲珮; pinyin: Xǔ Zhépèi; born 2 February 1981) is a Taiwanese singer-songwriter, songwriter and record producer. She made her debut in 2001 with the self-written studio album Balloon and was nominated for Best New Artist at the 13th Golden Melody Awards.

In 2007, Hsu shared the Golden Melody Award for Best Album Producer with Hui-Ting Chen, Hsu Che-Yu, Lin Chien-Yuan and Lin Hui-Bin for their production work on Tizzy Bac's album 我想你會變成這樣都是我害的. She was later nominated again in the category for Magical Shop at the 23rd Golden Melody Awards.

Her 2015 album Swing Inc. received nominations at the 27th Golden Melody Awards for Best Mandarin Album, Best Female Mandarin Singer and Best Album Producer, among other categories. Her 2019 album Hypnocity was subsequently nominated for Best Mandarin Album, Best Female Mandarin Singer, Best Album Producer and Best Vocal Recording Album at the 31st Golden Melody Awards. In 2020, Hsu won Best Singer-Songwriter at the 11th Golden Indie Music Awards for Hypnocity.

In 2025, Hsu released her eleventh studio album, Sorrow's Resting Hollow. She then embarked on the Frozen Star tour, which visited Taipei, Shanghai, Hangzhou, Guangzhou and Beijing and concluded in Beijing in 2026.

== Life and career ==
=== 2001–2006: Debut and behind-the-scenes work ===
Hsu entered the Mandopop industry in 2001 with her debut studio album, Balloon, and was nominated for Best New Artist at the 13th Golden Melody Awards.

Following the release of her debut album, she increasingly worked as a songwriter and producer for other artists. A 2007 profile cited Evonne Hsu, Gigi Leung, Joi Chua, Fish Leong and Sandy Lam among the singers who had recorded her compositions.

=== 2007–2013: Solo recordings and record production ===
In 2007, Hsu shared the Golden Melody Award for Best Album Producer for her work on Tizzy Bac's 我想你會變成這樣都是我害的. The same year she released Peggy's Wish Box, her first solo album in approximately six years.

She released Beautiful and Snowman in 2009. In 2010 she issued the EP Le Cirque, toured with the Beautiful Snowman concert programme and performed at Huayi – Chinese Festival of Arts at Singapore's Esplanade.

Her 2011 album Magical Shop earned her another Golden Melody Award nomination for Best Album Producer.

=== 2014–2020: Swing Inc. and Hypnocity ===
Hsu released the triple-metre concept album La Valse on 6 May 2014.

In 2015 she released Swing Inc., co-produced with Owen Wang. Built around electro swing, the album combined swing, jazz and electronic elements; Wang said in an interview that there had been no comparable release in the Mandopop industry at the time. It was nominated for Best Mandarin Album at the 27th Golden Melody Awards; Hsu was nominated for Best Female Mandarin Singer and, with Wang, for Best Album Producer. The track 〈給提姆波頓先生的一封信〉 was also nominated for Best Arrangement.

In 2016, Hsu performed in the United Kingdom with Suming Rupi and Miss Ko under the Taiwan Beats banner, appearing at London's Village Underground before taking part in the Glastonbury Festival.

Hsu and Wang again co-produced her 2019 album Hypnocity. Centred on the subconscious and reincarnation, it used her experiences of hypnosis as the basis for a narrative moving through past, present and future. At the 31st Golden Melody Awards it was nominated for Best Mandarin Album and Best Vocal Recording Album; Hsu was nominated for Best Female Mandarin Singer and, with Wang, Best Album Producer. KOBUDO won Best Arrangement for the album track 〈戰〉.

Hypnocity also received Golden Indie Music Award nominations for Best Album, Best Singer-Songwriter and Best Alternative Pop Album; Hsu won Best Singer-Songwriter.

=== 2021–present: In My Place and Sorrow's Resting Hollow ===
On 31 December 2021, Hsu released the 20th-anniversary project In My Place, recorded with guitarist Hsu Yen-Pei and comprising newly arranged recordings of eight earlier songs.

On 22 September 2025, Hsu released her eleventh studio album, Sorrow's Resting Hollow, a ten-song collection again co-produced with Owen Wang. Later that year she began the Frozen Star tour, subsequently performing in Shanghai, Hangzhou, Guangzhou and Beijing before concluding the tour in Beijing in 2026.

== Discography ==
=== Studio albums ===
Year	Title	Notes
2001	Balloon	Debut studio album
2007	Peggy's Wish Box	
2009	Beautiful	
2009	Snowman	
2011	Magical Shop	
2014	La Valse	Triple-metre concept album
2015	Swing Inc.	Electro swing concept album
2019	Hypnocity	Concept album centred on the subconscious and reincarnation
2021	In My Place	20th-anniversary re-recording project; eight earlier songs newly arranged and recorded
2025	Sorrow's Resting Hollow	

=== EP ===
Year	Title
2010	Le Cirque
2024	Hypnocity: Selected Instrumental Score

=== Singles ===
Only officially released standalone singles are listed; songs included on Hsu's albums are not repeated here.

Year	Title	Notes
2026	〈微光〉	Theme song for the Disney+ series The Zoo

== Film and television music ==
Hsu has contributed songs and music to films, a short film and a television series.

Year	Production	Director	Contribution
2013	The Stolen Years (《被偷走的那五年》), film	Barbara Wong	Composed the insert song 〈健忘〉, performed by Valen Hsu.
2021	The Soul (《緝魂》), film	Cheng Wei-hao	Composed the theme song 〈不苦〉, written by Cheng and performed by Wu Qing-feng.
2021	《命中註定那頭鵝》, short film	Yang Yu-yu	Wrote, composed and performed the insert song 〈一起搖擺吧〉.
2026	The Zoo (《動物園》), television series	Su Wen-sheng	Music director; composed and produced music for the series and its soundtrack.

== Theatre and interdisciplinary work ==
Alongside her recording career, Hsu has worked in musical theatre and other stage productions as a performer, composer and music designer. She appeared in If Kids Theatre's production of The Secret Garden beginning in 2007 and played the lead role in Lil' Flora beginning in 2008. She also performed in the stage adaptation of Jimmy Liao's The Afternoon of Spring in 2010. A 2014 interview discussed how her experience performing in The Secret Garden influenced her approach to storytelling through music.

In 2022, Hsu performed in Hypnocity: Immersive Theatre, a stage production developed from her 2019 album. Owen Wang served as music director and Chen Yu-ju as writer-director.

Year	Production	Company / collaborator	Hsu's contribution
2007, 2010, 2011, 2024	The Secret Garden (《祕密花園》)	If Kids Theatre	Performer
2008 onward	Lil' Flora (《小花》)	If Kids Theatre	Lead performer
2010	The Afternoon of Spring (《走向春天的下午》)	Molang Theatre	Performer
2012	The Snow Queen (《雪后》)	If Kids Theatre / Wonder Music	Lead performer, music design
2013	《大紅帽與小野狼》	All U People Theatre	Lead performer
2014	MRT – The Junction (《MRT音樂劇－交界》)	Perfect Match Theatre	Music composition
2014	《捕夢的小孩》	If Kids Theatre	Music design
2016, 2018	《月光下的搖擺少女》	Studio M	Performer
2022	Hypnocity: Immersive Theatre (《失物之城》沈浸式音樂劇場)	Ice Studio / Studio M	Original music, performer

== Awards and nominations ==
Year	Award	Work	Category	Result	Source
2002	13th Golden Melody Awards	Balloon	Best New Artist	Nominated	
2002	Singapore Hit Awards	Balloon	Best New Artist	Bronze	
2007	18th Golden Melody Awards	Tizzy Bac《我想你會變成這樣都是我害的》	Best Album Producer	Won	
2010	13th Chinese Musician Exchange Association Annual Top Ten Albums and Singles	Snowman	Top Ten Album of the Year	Selected	
2011	2nd Golden Indie Music Awards	Le Cirque; 〈櫻桃色情人〉	Best Singer-Songwriter; Best R&B Single	Best Singer-Songwriter: nominated; Best R&B Single: won	
2012	23rd Golden Melody Awards	Magical Shop	Best Album Producer	Nominated	
2012	3rd Golden Indie Music Awards	Magical Shop	Best Singer-Songwriter	Nominated	
2012	15th Chinese Musician Exchange Association Annual Top Ten Albums and Singles	Magical Shop	Top Ten Album of the Year	Selected	
2015	16th Chinese Music Media Awards	Swing Inc.	Best Producer of the Year – Peggy Hsu and Owen Wang	Won	
2016	27th Golden Melody Awards	Swing Inc.; 〈給提姆波頓先生的一封信〉	Best Mandarin Album; Best Female Mandarin Singer; Best Album Producer (Peggy Hsu and Owen Wang); Best Arrangement (Yu-Ying Hsu and Lu Lu-Ming)	Nominated	
2016	7th Golden Indie Music Awards	Swing Inc.; 〈給提姆波頓先生的一封信〉; 《我們一起搖擺吧》 Taipei concert	Best Album; Best Singer-Songwriter; Best Genre Album; Best Genre Single; Best Live Performance	Nominated	
2020	31st Golden Melody Awards	Hypnocity; 〈戰〉	Best Mandarin Album; Best Female Mandarin Singer; Best Album Producer (Owen Wang and Peggy Hsu); Best Vocal Recording Album; Best Arrangement (KOBUDO)	Best Arrangement: won; others nominated	
2020	11th Golden Indie Music Awards	Hypnocity; 〈離別曲〉	Best Album; Best Singer-Songwriter; Best Alternative Pop Album; Best Alternative Pop Song	Best Singer-Songwriter: won; others nominated	
2026	11th Lavender Music Awards	Sorrow's Resting Hollow; “The Boy of Ice and the Girl of Flame”	Album of the Year; Best Female Singer; Best Collaboration	Nominated	
2026	19th Freshmusic Awards	Sorrow's Resting Hollow	Top 10 Albums – Top 25 shortlist	Nominated	
2026	17th Golden Indie Music Awards	Lament of the Isolated Beast (〈與世隔絕的怪物〉)	Best Alternative Pop Song	Nominated	

Note: The Golden Melody Award for Best Arrangement is awarded to the credited arranger rather than the recording artist. The 2016 nomination for 〈給提姆波頓先生的一封信〉 was credited to Yu-Ying Hsu and Lu Lu-Ming; the 2020 award for 〈戰〉 was credited to KOBUDO.

== Concerts and major performances ==
This section lists representative solo concerts, tours, international performances and major music festivals. Promotional appearances, record-store events and cancelled performances are excluded.

Year	Title	Location / notes	Source
2001	《白色婚禮》實力見證會	Taipei; first solo concert	
2004, 2006	TaiwanFest	Vancouver in 2004; Vancouver and Toronto in 2006	
2010	Beautiful Snowman concert tour	Taipei, Hong Kong and cities in mainland China	
2010	Huayi – Chinese Festival of Arts, in::music	Esplanade – Theatres on the Bay, Singapore	
2010	Le Cirque tour	Taiwan and mainland China	
2010－2016, 2018、2020、2023、2024	Dear Xmas	Annual Christmas concert series; staged in Taipei, Hualien, Hong Kong and Singapore; the 2020 edition was presented online	
2011	Magical Shop tour	Taiwan	
2012	Liverpool Sound City	Liverpool, United Kingdom; performances on 17 and 19 May 2012	
2013	South by Southwest (SXSW)	Austin, Texas, United States	
2014	La Valse concert	Taipei	
2015	La Valse unplugged tour	Taiwan and mainland China	
2015	《我們一起搖擺吧》	Taipei and Taichung; the Taipei performance was nominated for Best Live Performance at the 7th Golden Indie Music Awards	
2016	Taiwan Beats / Glastonbury Festival	United Kingdom; Village Underground in London followed by Glastonbury Festival	
2017	《Sweet Sixteen》	Taipei and Kaohsiung; 16th-anniversary concerts	
2025–2026	Frozen Star tour	Taipei, Shanghai, Hangzhou, Guangzhou and Beijing	

== Songwriting and production credits ==
In addition to her own recordings, Hsu has written and composed songs and worked in arrangement, backing vocals, vocal production and record production for other artists. The following list is based on publicly available credits for officially released works; tracks on Hsu's solo albums are not repeated individually.

Year	Artist	Work	Release / album	Credits
2001	Snow Hsiao	〈Who's the One〉	《那些別人要的....》	Composition
2002	Evonne Hsu	〈Don't Come Back To Me〉	《快樂為主》	Lyrics, composition
2002	Evonne Hsu	〈口紅指甲油〉	《快樂為主》	Lyrics, composition
2002	Evonne Hsu	〈大手拉小手〉	《孤單芭蕾》	Lyrics, composition
2003	Evonne Hsu	〈感謝〉	《美麗的愛情》	Lyrics, composition; co-arrangement with Chen Chien-Liang
2004	Gigi Leung	〈沉迷〉	《歸屬感》	Lyrics, composition
2004	Evonne Hsu	〈悲傷獨角獸〉	《幸福》	Lyrics, composition
2004	Evonne Hsu	〈愛情微舒打〉	《幸福》	Lyrics, composition
2004	Joi Chua	〈不還你〉	《日出》	Lyrics, composition, production
2004	Joi Chua	〈愛上你的時候〉	《日出》	Lyrics
2004	Joi Chua	〈好女人〉	《日出》	Production
2004	Joi Chua	〈Future〉	《日出》	Composition
2004	Joi Chua	〈你的未來〉	《日出》	Lyrics, composition, production
2004	Joi Chua	〈蝴蝶〉	《日出》	Lyrics, composition, production
2005	魏雪漫	〈妳的眼淚很美麗〉	《妳的眼淚很美麗》	Lyrics, composition
2005	同恩	〈失去〉	《做自己》	Lyrics, composition
2005	Joi Chua	〈平凡就是幸福〉	《有一天我會》	Lyrics, composition
2005	Fish Leong	〈很久以後〉	《絲路》	Lyrics, composition
2006	Tizzy Bac	《我想你會變成這樣都是我害的》	—	Co-production, vocal production, backing-vocal arrangement
2006	蕭瀟	〈月兒彎彎〉	《I'm蕭蕭》	Lyrics, composition
2006	Twins	〈妳最勇敢〉	《八十塊環遊世界》	Lyrics
2006	Sandy Lam	〈放開手〉	《呼吸》	Lyrics, composition
2006	Evonne Hsu	〈轉圈圈〉	《謎》	Lyrics, composition, production
2006	Genie Chuo	〈冬天的橘子〉	《習慣》	Lyrics, composition
2006	賈立怡	〈一個人生活〉	《感恩節》	Lyrics
2006	賈立怡	〈夢不落〉	《感恩節》	Lyrics
2007	無限	〈白鴿〉	《翼之星2007》	Lyrics, composition, production
2007	Tizzy Bac	《維克多的玫瑰》	EP	Vocal production
2007	Rainie Yang	〈學會〉	《任意門》	Lyrics, composition
2007	If Kids Theatre	〈孤零零〉	祕密花園音樂劇原聲帶	Composition
2007	If Kids Theatre	〈花園〉	祕密花園音樂劇原聲帶	Composition
2008	種子音樂群星	〈夢想的翅膀〉	《夢想的翅膀》	Co-composition with Michael Wong
2008	袁泉	〈一個人旅行〉	《Short Stay No.2 沖繩》	Composition
2008	Genie Chuo	〈自己找答案〉	《超級喜歡》	Composition
2008	Annie Yi	〈我對你有多好〉	《夢想的翅膀》; ending theme of the television series 《鎖清秋》	Composition
2009	Evonne Hsu	〈綻花〉	《愛‧極限》	Composition
2009	Weibird Wei	〈慢慢等〉	《慢慢等》EP	Vocal production
2010	Maggie Chiang	〈月光下〉	《月光下》	Co-lyrics with Maggie Chiang
2010	Maggie Chiang	〈愛笑的你〉	《月光下》	Lyrics, vocal production, backing-vocal arrangement and performance, recording
2010	Jing Chang	〈你是唯一〉	《相反的我》	Vocal production
2012	Sharon Kwan	〈第一次失戀〉	《關在家》	Composition
2012	Alan Dawa Dolma	〈孤獨的天份〉	Love Song	Lyrics, composition
2012	Sharon Kwan	〈半個地球的掛念〉	《關在家》	Lyrics, composition, vocal production
2012	Jolin Tsai	〈詩人漫步〉	《MUSE》	Lyrics, composition, production
2012	Jolin Tsai	〈Dr. Jolin〉	《MUSE》	Lyrics
2012	山東	〈少女A〉	《我是山東》	Composition
2012	Aggie Hsieh	〈獨一無二的女孩〉	《What's Mine》	Lyrics, composition, vocal production
2012	Aggie Hsieh	〈一口呼吸的旅行〉	《What's Mine》	Lyrics, vocal production
2013	Evonne Hsu	〈美好的時光〉	《欣·進化》	Lyrics, composition
2013	Evonne Hsu	〈星星〉	《欣·進化》	Lyrics, composition
2013	Evonne Hsu	〈月色〉	《欣·進化》	Lyrics, composition
2013	René Liu	〈遺忘的都回來了〉	《親愛的路人》	Lyrics, composition
2013	Alien Huang	〈村上的貓〉	《超有感》	Lyrics
2013	Annie Yi	〈可愛的寶貝〉	《可愛的寶貝》	Lyrics, composition, production
2014	Valen Hsu	〈健忘〉	《奇蹟》	Composition
2014	Maggie Chiang	〈過去了〉	《面具》	Lyrics, composition
2014	Eva Chen (陳牧耶)	〈魔鬼的禮物〉	《魔鬼的禮物》 EP	Songwriting
2015	周子琰	〈隨之舞蹈〉	《路過青春》	Lyrics, composition
2016	Easy Shen and Peggy Hsu	〈動機〉	如果時間流轉我們依然	Duet vocals
2016	Slowly Talk (慢慢說樂團)	〈喜歡待在家〉	《驕傲地愛著》	Production
2016	Tia Lee	〈是我不夠好〉	—	Vocal production, backing-vocal arrangement and performance, recording
2016	Juno Mak	〈髮落無聲〉	《Evil Is a Point of View》	Composition, arrangement
2016	Juno Mak	〈如來像去〉	《Evil Is a Point of View》	Composition
2017	盧潔雲	〈陪我散步回家〉	—	Lyrics, composition, arrangement, production
2017	Prince Chiu	〈愛上了妳〉	《ATTENTION!》	Vocal production, backing-vocal arrangement and performance, recording
2017	盧潔雲	〈雨季的巴黎〉	—	Lyrics, composition, production, recording
2017	Lulu Huang	〈可以〉	《可以》	Lyrics, composition, production
2017	Lulu Huang	〈星星棉花糖〉	《可以》	Lyrics, composition
2018	Summer Meng	〈只是想太多〉	《#不可愛》	Lyrics, composition, production
2018	Summer Meng	〈走吧走吧〉	《#不可愛》	Lyrics, composition, production
2018	Dewi Chien	〈奇怪女孩〉	《大衛女孩》	Lyrics, composition, production, backing-vocal arrangement and performance, recording
2018	Valen Hsu	〈蜂蜜月亮〉	《綻放的綻放的綻放》	Lyrics、Backing-vocal arrangement and performance
2018	Vera Yen	《告白》	—	Vocal production; co-backing-vocal arrangement and backing vocals on 〈別瞎猜〉
2018	Won Fu	《旺情歌》	—	Album vocal production
2019	Won Fu	〈一人一半〉	—	Vocal production, recording
2019	Evan Yo	〈變心記〉	《變心記》	Production
2019	Evan Yo feat. Eve Ai	〈伎倆〉	《變心記》	Production
2019	Crispy	〈宇宙的角落〉	《有多少光就有多少黑》	Production
2019	Rainie Yang	〈泥土〉	《刪·拾 以後》	Lyrics, composition, production, recording
2020	Freya Lim	〈可是我們呢〉	—	Composition, arrangement, production, recording
2020	Yo Lee feat. 洪安妮	〈想和你一起〉	—	Production, co-arrangement, recording
2020	Kenji Wu	《你說，我聽著呢…》	—	Album production participation; backing-vocal arrangement, backing vocals and vocal production
2020	Rainie Yang	〈都因為你〉	《Like a Star》	Lyrics
2021	Wu Qing-feng	〈不苦〉	—	Composition
2021	Won Fu	《你好我好大家好》	—	Co-production with Yao Hsiao-Min
2022	K6 Liu Chia-Kai, Won Fu	〈泡泡〉	—	Vocal production, co-backing-vocal arrangement, vocal recording
2024	Won Fu	〈夜市 Oh Yes〉	—	Vocal production, vocal recording
2024	Won Fu	〈好孩子〉	—	Vocal production, keyboards
2024	Peggy Hsu	〈眼淚英雄〉	《虎姑婆和他的朋友》	Lyrics, vocals, co-arrangement with Hung Yun-hui
2025	Won Fu	〈呷飽未〉	—	Vocal production, vocal recording
2025	Kenji Wu, Momo Wu	〈喫愛情的苦〉	—	Co-composition, vocal production, performance production, backing-vocal arrangement, vocal recording
2025	Julia Peng	〈總有一首歌會提醒我愛你〉	《完整的大人》	Lyrics, composition, production
2025	Rainie Yang	〈坐上慢車吹自由的風〉	《有且》	Production, backing-vocal arrangement and performance, recording
2025	Mono Yang and Peggy Hsu	〈請編排我〉	墜落前的窺視	Duet vocals
2026	Fu Kai Hsu	〈尪仔物〉	《尪仔物》	Production, recording
