= Dancing Forever (song) =

Single by Jolin Tsai

from the album Dancing Forever
- Language: Mandarin
- Released: September 13, 2006
- Studio: Mega Force (New Taipei)
- Genre: Pop
- Length: 4:06
- Label: EMI; Mars
- Composers: Roger Olsson; Klas Johan Wahl; Nick Whitecross
- Lyricist: Issac Chen
- Producer: Adia

Jolin Tsai singles chronology
"Marry Me Today" (2006)	"Dancing Forever" (2006)	"Agent J" (2007)

Music video
- "Dancing Forever" on YouTube

"Dancing Forever" (Chinese: 唯舞獨尊; pinyin: Wéi wǔ dú zūn) is a song by Taiwanese singer Jolin Tsai, featured on her 2006 compilation album Dancing Forever. Written by Roger Olsson, Klas Johan Wahl, Nick Whitecross, and Issac Chen, the track was produced by Adia. Released as a single on September 13, 2006, by EMI, it served as the theme song for the online game We Dancing Online.

== Background ==
On May 31, 2006, Tsai's manager, Howard Chiang, revealed that she was preparing for a new concert tour later that year. On July 17, 2006, Tsai officially announced that the Dancing Forever World Tour would begin on September 15, 2006, at the Hong Kong Coliseum. Taiwanese media reported on August 20, 2006, that Tsai had recorded the tour's theme song, "Dancing Forever", and filmed its accompanying music video the previous day.

== Composition ==
"Dancing Forever" opens with a rhythmic prelude that creates a suspenseful yet steady atmosphere. The song features a blend of dance-pop with energetic electronic elements, characteristic of Tsai's upbeat style. The lyrics are simple and memorable, promoting themes of confidence, vitality, and perseverance.

== Music video ==
The music video for "Dancing Forever", directed by Jeff Chang, was released on September 16, 2006. In the video, Tsai portrays a statue in a museum who comes to life, breaking free from a glass case. She first transforms into a glamorous socialite before becoming a hip-hop dancer dressed in a red tracksuit, performing energetic choreography with a dance crew.

== Commercial performance ==
"Dancing Forever" peaked at number 46 on Hit FM Top 100 Singles of the Year in Taiwan for 2006.

== Live performances ==
Tsai performed the song on November 17, 2006, during an appearance on Dragon Television's variety show Let's Shake It. On February 4, 2007, she performed the track at the Windows Vista Wow Concert, followed by a performance on CCTV's One Chinese Heart on November 1, 2007. Additional performances of "Dancing Forever" took place at the M Conference on January 11, 2008, and at the opening ceremony of the 4th China International Cartoon and Animation Festival on April 28, 2008.

== Credits and personnel ==
- Andrew Chen – guitar
- Jolin Tsai – backing vocals
- Adia – backing vocals, vocal arrangement
- AJ Chen – recording engineering
- Mega Force Studio – recording and mixing studio
- Keller Wang – mixing engineering

== Release history ==
Release dates and formats for "Dancing Forever"
Region	Date	Format(s)	Distributor
China	September 13, 2006	Radio airplay	Push Typhoon
Taiwan	September 13, 2006	Radio airplay	EMI
