= Live Earth concert, Shanghai =

Concert event

Live Earth
- Shanghai Concert location
Location	Oriental Pearl Tower, Shanghai, China
Founded by	Al Gore and Kevin Wall
Date	July 7, 2007
Genre(s)	Pop and Rock music
Website	Live Earth China Site

The Live Earth concert in China was held at Oriental Pearl Tower, Shanghai on 7 July 2007.

== Running order ==
- Evonne Hsu - "Love on July 7", "Lost in Venice", "I" (SH 11:36)
- Anthony Wong - "The Little Prince", "The Season", "Venus" (SH 12:06)
- Soler - "Not Along", "Fiona's Song", "Lead", "Hey Ma" (SH 12:46)
- Huang Xiao Ming - "Secret Love", "My Girl" (SH 13:16)
- 12 Girls Band - "Jasmin", "The New Classics", "Glory" (SH 13:46)
- Joey Yung - "The Girl Waving Her Wings", "Renaissance of Love", "Little Little" (SH 14:16)
- Winnie Hsin - "Have Been Loved", "The Reply for Love", "The Taste of Love" (SH 14:46)
- Sarah Brightman - "Nessun Dorma", "Time to Say Goodbye", "La Luna" (SH 15:26)
- Wang Xiao Kun (王啸坤) (SH 15:56)
- Eason Chan - "The Floating City", "Squander", "Happy Boy" (SH 16:36)
- Wang Rui (王睿) & Wang Chuan Jun (王传君) - "手牵手" ("Hand in Hand") (SH 17:06)
- Pu Ba Jia (蒲巴甲) (SH 17:36)

== Coverage ==
=== Online ===
MSN was responsible for the online broadcasting of the concert.
