= International General Certificate of Secondary Education =

English language-based academic qualification

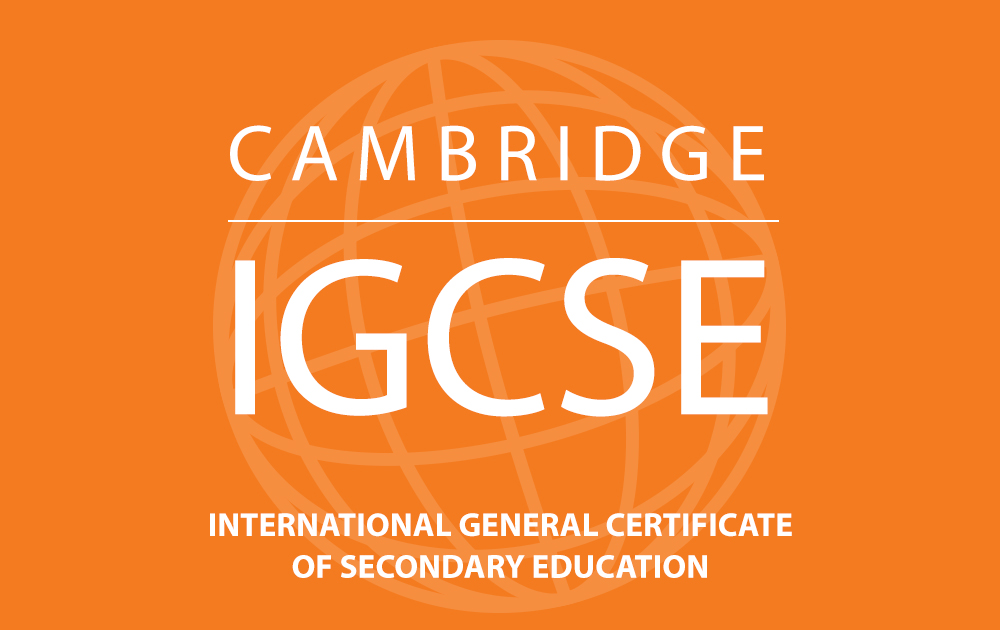
International General Certificate of Secondary Education

The International General Certificate of Secondary Education (IGCSE) is an English language-based secondary qualification similar to the GCSE and is recognised in the United Kingdom as being equivalent to the GCSE for the purposes of recognising prior attainment. It was developed by Cambridge International Education. The examination boards Edexcel, Learning Resource Network (LRN), and Oxford AQA also offer their own versions of International GCSEs. Students normally begin studying the syllabus at the beginning of Year 10 and take the test at the end of Year 11. However, in some international schools, students can begin studying the syllabus at the beginning of Year 9 and take the test at the end of Year 10.

The qualifications are based on individual subjects off study, which means that one receives an "IGCSE" qualification for each subject one takes. Typical "core" subjects for IGCSE candidates include a First Language, Second Language, Mathematics and one or more subjects in the Sciences.

== Examination Boards ==
Traditionally, Pearson Edexcel and especially Cambridge have a dominance in International GCSEs.

=== CAMBRIDGE IGCSE ===
Cambridge IGCSE exams are conducted in three sessions: February/March (India only), May/June and October/November, and the results are released in May, August and January respectively. The exams are set by Cambridge International Education (CIE), which is part of Cambridge University Press and Assessment that also includes OCR, a UK GCSE examination board. As of January 2021, there are over 70 subjects available and schools can offer them in any combination.

The Cambridge examination board offers an ICE (International Certificate in Education) group qualification for candidates who achieve 7 subject passes across the following groups:

- Group 1: Languages
- Group 2: Humanities and Social Sciences
- Group 3: Sciences
- Group 4: Mathematics
- Group 5: Creative and Vocational (Professional and Creative)

The certificate is awarded to candidates who pass in seven IGCSE subjects — two Group 1 subjects, one subject from each of Groups 2–5, and a seventh subject which can be selected from any Group.

The ICE is awarded in three categories:

- Distinction (Grade A or better in five subjects and Grade C or better in two subjects)
- Merit (Grade C or better in five subjects and Grade F or better in two subjects)
- Pass (Grade G or better in seven subjects)

In addition, to award top candidates, Cambridge awards "Outstanding Achievement Awards" in the categories of "top in country" and "top in world" for each subject. "Top in Region" awards are handed to students as well, in Egypt, Saudi Arabia, and Pakistan.

=== Pearson Edexcel IGCSE ===
Edexcel International GCSE exams used to be conducted in June and January. From the academic year starting September 2023, Edexcel International GCSE exams are conducted in June and November. The last session for January Exams is January 2023 (Academic Year September 2022 to August 2023) and the first session for November Exams is November 2023 (Academic Year September 2023 to August 2024). The exams are set by Edexcel which also sets GCSE exams in the UK.

=== Oxford AQA International GCSE ===
Oxford AQA International GCSE exams are conducted in May/June and November. The exams are set by Oxford AQA (Oxford International AQA Examinations), which is a joint venture between AQA which sets GCSE exams in the UK and Oxford University Press (OUP).

== Comparisons with GCSE ==
Before changes to GCSE first taken in 2017, the IGCSE was often considered to be more similar to the older O-Levels qualification than the current GCSE in England, and for this reason was often argued to be a more rigorous and more difficult examination. Before the early 2010s, most schools offering the IGCSE were private international schools for expatriate children around the world. However, in the 2010s, an increasing number of independent schools within the United Kingdom also began offering IGCSEs as an alternative to conventional English GCSEs for international IGCSE subjects, on the supposed basis that it is more challenging than the national curriculum. A comparison between GCSEs and IGCSEs was conducted by the Department of Education in 2019. The study found that it was easier to achieve a grade A in English Language and English Literature in IGCSEs but harder to achieve a grade A in mathematics and science subjects. Most other subjects were roughly equivalent.

The change from an A*-G grading system to a 9-1 grading system by English GCSE qualifications has led to a 9-1 grade International General Certificate of Secondary Education being made available. Before, this qualification was graded on an 8-point scale from A* to G with a 9th grade "U" signifying "Ungraded". This measure of grading was also found in the UK GCSE. Most IGCSE subjects offer a choice of tiered examinations: Core or Extended papers (in Cambridge International), and Foundation or Higher papers (in Edexcel). This is designed to make IGCSE suitable for students with varying levels of ability. In some subjects, IGCSE can be taken with or without coursework.

At one point in time, the "A*" grade in the GCSE did not exist but was later added to recognise the very top end of achievement. In the case of Further Mathematics, an extra A* grade was added for students that can "demonstrate sustained performance in higher-level maths skills such as reasoning, proof and problem-solving."

== Recognition and equivalence ==
The qualification is recognised by many institutions in the world. It also allows further vocational education and is often considered the baseline for employment.

Its academic worth is comparable to many secondary school curricula worldwide, such as England's GCSE, the North American GED or high school diploma, Hong Kong's HKCEE, Singapore's O-Level, and the Indian ICSE courses. The IGCSE prepares students for further academic study, including progression to A Level and BTEC Level 3 study, LRN Pre-U, IB Diploma Programme and other equivalents. It is recognised by academic institutions and employers around the world and is considered by many institutions as equivalent to the standard GCSE.

=== Hong Kong ===
The IGCSE exam is widely used in international schools. Students in Hong Kong can take the Cambridge exam board as well as the Edexcel exam board, either at their school or registering through the Hong Kong Examinations and Assessment Authority (HKEAA) as individual candidates.

=== Macao ===
The IGCSE exam is widely used in schools where the teaching medium is English and which adopt the IGCSE curriculum. Students in some international schools (Macau Anglican College, School of Nations, and Generations International School) can take the Cambridge exam board, as well as the Edexcel exam board at their schools (Pui Ching Middle School (Coloane Campus), Instituto Salesiano, Yuet Wah College, Sacred Heart Canossian College (English Section), Escola Santa Rosa de Lima (English Section), and Chan Shui Ki Perpetual Help College.

=== Singapore and Malaysia ===
The IGCSE exam is predominantly used in international schools, while other schools offer it as an alternative to O Level exams.

=== United Kingdom ===
The official status of IGCSEs has changed several times in the UK.

In 2013 the Office of Qualifications and Examinations Regulation (Ofqual) allowed more use of IGCSE subjects in state-funded schools. However, they were to be referred to as 'certificates' rather than IGCSEs for accreditation purposes, to avoid confusion. Initially, 16 Cambridge IGCSE syllabuses received UK government accreditation. Following that, the UK government announced that the 16 accredited Cambridge IGCSE syllabuses could also be funded in state-maintained schools. Subsequently, Cambridge IGCSE German and Spanish were also accredited and funded, taking the total number of accredited and funded Cambridge IGCSEs to 18. For accreditation purposes, the syllabuses are referenced as "Cambridge International Certificates" in the UK, although they are known across the world as Cambridge IGCSEs. Besides Cambridge, International GCSEs are offered by two other examination boards in the UK: Edexcel and Oxford AQA.

However, from 2017 the government decided to exclude IGCSEs from official performance tables, and consequentially entries from state schools have fallen. So that whilst "international GCSEs no longer meet the condition of funding; however, they do continue to count as equivalent to GCSEs for the purposes of recognising prior attainment."

In 2018, 91% of IGCSE UK entries in core subjects were in private schools, and about 75% for all subjects.

=== United States ===
While the number of North American schools offering the IGCSE remains small, some homeschooling educators are said to be choosing the IGCSE instead of a typical North American high school curriculum. According to many of these educators, the IGCSE curriculum may be more advanced than a typical North American secondary school course by at least one year.

=== Italy ===
For some years in Italy many high schools have joined a Cambridge Schools Network, becoming Cambridge International Schools. The aim of these schools is to get students IGCSE and As & A Level certifications. Some Italian Universities as well accept both IGCSE and AS & A Level certifications, but a minimum of grade is often required for the admission.

== Cancellations ==
During the COVID-19 pandemic, all IGCSE examinations due to take place in May/June 2020 were cancelled, along with GCSE and A-Level exams that year. As of 31 March 2020, CIE had decided to guide schools to predict students' grades through evidence such as mock examination results.

On 30 April 2020, Pearson Edexcel announced that grades for the May/June 2020 exam would be calculated using information from schools. Schools were asked to provide an assessment grade for each student, as well as a ranked order of students within each grade by 29 May 2020.

For the June 2021 exam series, CIE plans for exams to go ahead in countries that are permitted and safe, and countries where exams cannot take place due to government directives will switch to school-assessed grades using evidence like student coursework and mock exam results. There are also adjustments, exemptions, and special considerations available for schools that applies for them.
