= Evonne Hsu =

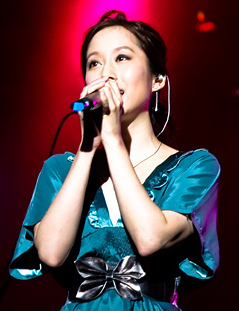
- Evonne Hsu performing at the 2007 Live Earth China in Shanghai
- Born: December 5, 1976 (age 49); Longview, Texas, United States
- Occupation: Singer
- Years active: 2002–present
- Awards: Golden Melody Awards – Best New Artist Award (2003)

Chinese name
- Traditional Chinese: 許慧欣
- Simplified Chinese: 许慧欣
Transcriptions
Standard Mandarin
- Hanyu Pinyin: Xǔ Huìxīn
- Musical career
- Also known as: Hsu Hui-hsin
- Origin: Republic of China (Taiwan)
- Genres: Mandopop
- Labels: What's Music (2002–2004); Universal Music Taiwan (2003–present)
- Website: Evonne Hsu@Music Nation Wingman

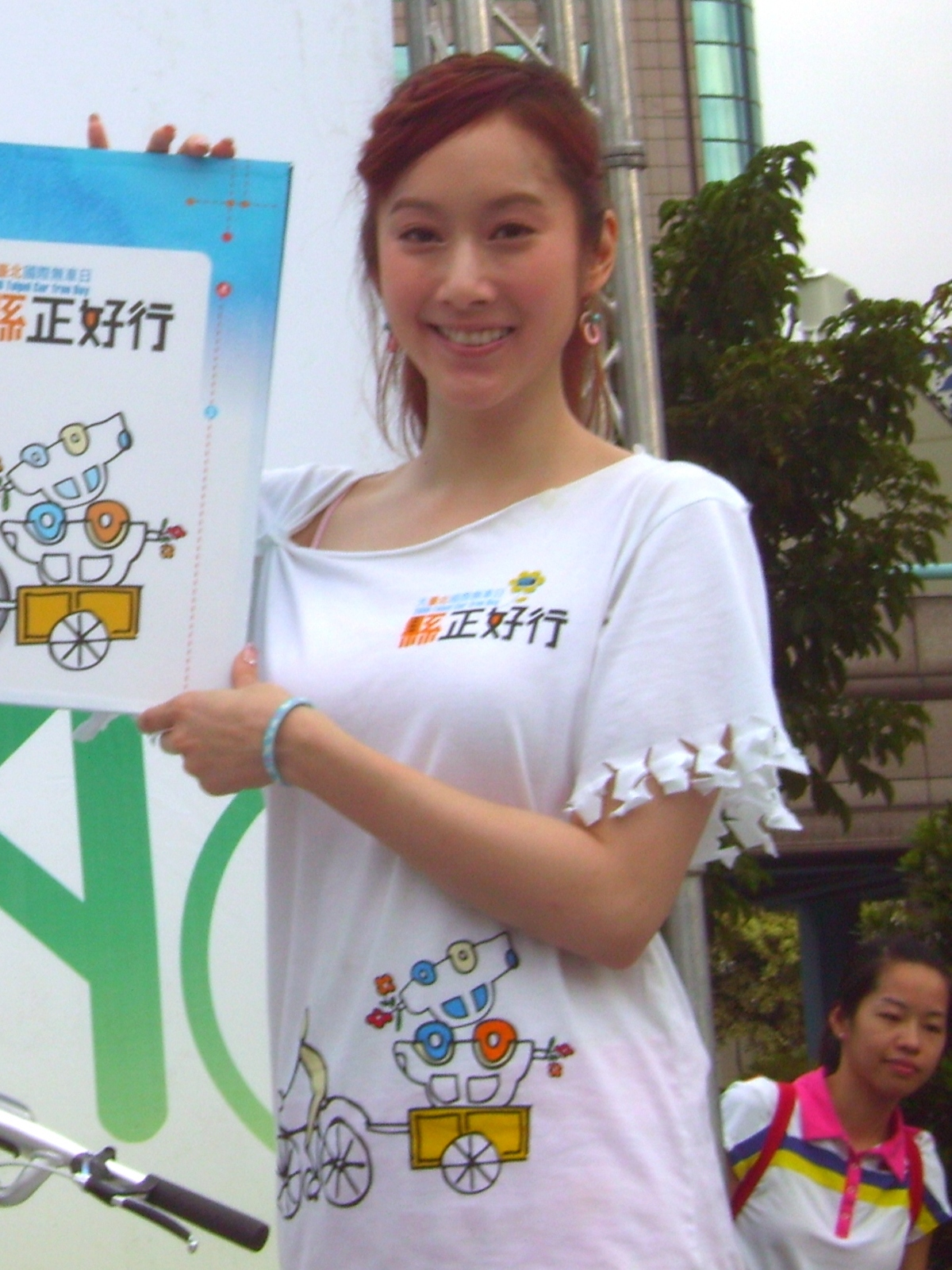
Evonne Hsu at the 2006 Taipei Car Free Day

Evonne Hsu, also known as Hsu Hui-hsin (Chinese: 許慧欣) (born December 5, 1976, in Longview, Texas, United States), is a Taiwanese-American Mandopop singer. Hsu is managed by Music Nation Wingman Limited and signed by Universal Music Taiwan since her debut in 2002.

== Early life ==
Evonne Hsu was born in Longview, Texas, United States. Hsu grew up with a love for singing and dancing but had chosen to major in psychology at the University of Texas at Austin when a musical arranger friend convinced her to make a demo tape of her singing.

== Career ==
Hsu released her debut album To Be Happy in January 2002. To date, she has released eight albums and has also published a book. On July 7, 2007, Hsu performed at the Chinese leg of Live Earth in Shanghai.

== Discography ==
=== Albums ===
| Album # | Release date | Title | Label |
|---|---|---|---|
| 1st | 3 January 2002 | To Be Happy (快樂為主) | Universal Music Taiwan |
| 2nd | 20 September 2002 | Lonely Ballet (孤單芭蕾) | Universal Music Taiwan |
| 3rd | 8 July 2003 | Beautiful Love (美麗的愛情) | Universal Music Taiwan |
| 4th | 16 June 2004 | Happiness (幸福) | Universal Music Taiwan |
| 5th | 15 November 2005 | Chosen One (萬中選一) | Universal Music Taiwan |
| 6th | 6 October 2006 | Mystery (謎) | Universal Music Taiwan |
| 7th | 11 July 2008 | 欣的記憶 | Universal Music Taiwan |
| 8th | 22 May 2009 | Love*Over (愛*極限) | Universal Music Taiwan |
| 9th | 11 January 2013 | Evolution (欣*進化) | Universal Music Taiwan |

=== Soundtracks ===
- Love Train Original Soundtrack
- Snow.Wolf.Lake Original Soundtrack

== Awards ==
| Year | Award | Category |
|---|---|---|
| 2002 | TVB8 (Hong Kong) | Most Popular Female New Artist Award |
| 2002 | MTV (Taiwan) | Top 20 Most Wanted Artists |
| 2002 | HITO Awards | Best Female Vocalist Award |
| 2002 | HITO Amicability Award | |
| 2002 | Shing-chen Chinese Radio | Best Female New Artist Award |
| 2003 | Best New Artist Award | GMA (Malaysia) |
| 2003 | 14th Golden Melody Awards, Taiwan | Best New Artist Award (Popular music) |
| 2003 | Channel V | Top 50 Hit Singles of the Year |
| 2003 | Channel V | Most Popular New Artist (nominated) |
| 2003 | G-Music Platinum Music Awards | |
| 2003 | TVB8 Music Award | |
| 2003 | MTV Style Awards | Best New Female Artist Style Award, |
| 2004 | TVB8 Music Award | |
| 2004 | MTV (Taiwan) | Top 20 Artists of the Year |
| 2004 | Canton Radio/TV Awards | Best Female Composer Artist (Taiwan) |

== Films ==
- Legend of Chinese Titans (2012)
- The Harbor 2012 (2012)
