= Huashang Morning Post =

Chinese newspaper

- Native name: 华商晨报
- Type: Daily newspaper
- Language: Chinese
- Headquarters: Shenyang
- Website: hscb.com.cn hsxiang.com

Huashang Morning Post or Huashang Chenbao (Chinese: 华商晨报), also known as Chinese Business Morning View or Shenyang Chinese Business Morning View or China Business Morning Post, was a Shenyang-based simplified Chinese metropolitan newspaper published in the People's Republic of China.

It was co-sponsored by the Liaoning Provincial Returned Overseas Chinese Federation (辽宁省归国华侨联合会) and Liaoning Newspaper Media Group (辽宁报业传媒集团).

The founding of the Huashang Morning Post can be traced back to 1993, when the Overseas Chinese Business Post (华侨商报) was launched. On January 1, 2019, the newspaper ceased publication.

== History ==
The predecessor of Huashang Morning Post was Overseas Chinese Business Post, which was founded in 1993. In March 2000, Chinese Business View (华商报) invested and participated in its operation.

On March 18, Chinese Business Morning View was officially relaunched and landed in Shenyang.

On January 1, 2019, Huashang Morning Post went out of print.
