= 18th Golden Melody Awards =

Taiwanese music award ceremony in 2007

- Date: June 16, 2007 (Popular)
- Location: Taipei Arena, Taipei, Taiwan (Popular)
- Hosted by: Matilda Tao, Patty Hou (Popular)

Television/radio coverage
- Network: Azio TV

The 18th Golden Melody Awards (Chinese: 第18屆金曲獎) ceremony for popular music category was held on June 16, 2007. The Azio TV broadcast the show live from the Taipei Arena in Taipei, Taiwan. The ceremony recognized the best recordings, compositions, and artists of the eligibility year, which runs from January 1, 2006, to December 31, 2006.

== Nominees and winners ==
Winners are highlighted in boldface.

=== Vocal category – Record label awards ===
==== Song of the Year ====
- **"Marry Me Today" (from Beautiful) – David Tao feat. Jolin Tsai**
  - "Planting Trees" (from Planting Trees) – Lin Sheng Xiang
  - "Faraway" (from Still Fantasy) – Jay Chou
  - "Same World" (from Without You) – Karen Mok
  - "Baby (In the Night)" (from My Life Will...) – Deserts Chang
  - "Little Love Song" (from Little Universe) –- Sodagreen

==== Best Mandarin Album ====
- **Wake Up – MC HotDog**
  - Blue in Love – Hao-en and Jiajia
  - My Life Will... – Deserts Chang
  - Little Universe – Sodagreen
  - All I Want – Jyotsna Pang
  - Dancing Diva – Jolin Tsai

==== Best Taiwanese Album ====
- **Jin Ei Ah Gey Ei!? – The Chairman**
  - The Whales – Chen Ming-chang
  - Poah Poe – Jody Chiang
  - Depose – Bang Bang Band
  - Thanx 4 Looking – New Formosa Band

==== Best Hakka Album ====
- **Planting Trees – Lin Sheng-xiang**
  - The Snow Wolfman – You Zhao-qi
  - Mountain and Farmland – Hsieh Yu-wei

==== Best Aboriginal Album ====
- **Beautiful Haiyan – Xiao-mei, Chen Yong-long, Ara Kimbo, Wu Hao-en, Suming, A-luo, Ka-silaw**
  - Singing a Beautiful Song – Taiwu Children's Ancient Ballads Troupe

=== Vocal category – Individual awards ===
==== Best Music Video Director ====
- **Stephen Fung – "Same World" (from Without You)**
  - Jay Chou – "Popular Imitation" (from Still Fantasy)
  - Fish Wang – "The Man Who Makes Words" (from The Light of Darkness)
  - Chen Pei-fu – "Happiness" (from Happiness)
  - Tsao Jui-yuan – "Pure Love" (from My Endless Love)
  - Chou Ko-tai – "Commitment" - (from Commitment)

==== Best Composition ====
- **Wu Tsing-fong – "Little Love Song" (from Little Universe)**
  - Lin Sheng-xiang – "Planting Trees" (from Plating Trees)
  - Deserts Chang – "Baby (In the Night) (from My Life Will...)
  - Li Tai-hsiang – "Mountain and Farmland" (from Mountain and Farmland)
  - David Tao – "Marry Me Today" (from Beautiful)
  - Kenji Wu – "A General Order" (from A General Order)

==== Best Lyrics ====
- **Zhong Yong-feng – "Planting Trees" (from Planting Trees)**
  - Vincent Fang – "Chrysanthemum Terrace" (from Still Fantasy)
  - Wu Yu-hsuan – "Grandpa's Bed" (from Poah Poe)
  - Lin Xi – "Same World" (from Without You)
  - Deserts Chang – "Baby (In the Night)" (from My Life Will...)
  - Wu Tsing-fong – "Little Love Song" (from Little Universe)

==== Best Music Arrangement ====
- **Chen Zhu-hui – "The Man Who Makes Words" (from The Light of Darkness)**
  - Yao Hung – "Fearless" (from Fearless)
  - Wayne Wang – "Lost" (from Blue in Love)
  - Li Yu-huan – "Savage Night (Club Mix 2000)" (from New Wave)
  - Sodagreen – "Little Love Song" (from Little Universe)

==== Producer of the Year, Album ====
- **Chen Hui-ting, Hsu Che-liu, Lin Chien-yuan, Bean Lin, Peggy Hsu – It's All My Fault**
  - Lin Sheng-xiang, Zhong Yong-feng, Zhong Shi-fang – Plating Trees
  - Hao-en – Blue in Love
  - Lin Wei-che – Little Universe
  - Bang Bang Band – Tong Zhi

==== Producer of the Year, Single ====
- **Jay Chou – "Fearless" (from Fearless)**
  - Chu Chien-hui, Hai Er – "The Descendants of Yandi and Huangdi Emperors" (from The Descendants of Yandi and Huangdi Emperors)
  - Adia – "Dancing Diva" (from Dancing Diva)

==== Best Mandarin Male Singer ====
- **Nicky Lee**
  - JJ Lin
  - Gary Chaw
  - David Tao
  - Kenji Wu

==== Best Taiwanese Male Singer ====
- **Michael Shih**
  - Yuan Xiao-di
  - Cheng Gin-yi
  - Chen Ming-chang
  - Chen Lei

==== Best Mandarin Female Singer ====
- **Jolin Tsai**
  - Angela Chang
  - Jyotsna Pang
  - A-mei
  - Penny Tai
  - Sandy Lam

==== Best Taiwanese Female Singer ====
- **Jeannie Hsieh**
  - Laney Wu
  - Showlen Maya
  - Fang Yi-ping

==== Best Hakka Singer ====
- **Lin Sheng-xiang**
  - Hsieh Yu-wei
  - Song Chen
  - Tang Ming-liang

==== Best Aboriginal Singer ====
- **I Jyi**
  - Yu Chia-chen
  - Lin Chao-ming

==== Best Band ====
- **Sodagreen**
  - Hai Er
  - 13
  - Self Kill
  - Tizzy Bac
  - Totem
  - Monkey Insane

==== Best Group ====
- **Wu-en and Jiajia**
  - Nan Quan Mama
  - Michelle Vickie
  - New Formosa Band

==== Best New Artist ====
- **Europa Huang**
  - Zhang Xianzi
  - A-lin
  - Evan Yo

=== Instrumental category – Record label awards ===
==== Best Instrumental Album ====
- **Send You a Blue Gift for Winter – Tao Wang, Sino Chen**
  - Night Flower – Lin Shao-ying
  - I-Yen-Mei-Leg Village No. 3 – Purdur
  - Ocarina Dreamer – You Xue-zhi

=== Instrumental category – Individual awards ===
==== Producer of the Year, Instrumental ====
- **Purdur – I-Yen-Mei-Leg Village No. 3**
  - Eric Chung, Lo Bei-tuo – Sun, Latino
  - Tao Wang, Sino Chen – Send You a Blue Gift for Winter
  - Gerald Shih, Cosine Tseng – Cynthia's Magical Fingers

=== Lifetime Contribution Award ===
- **Chang Hung-yi**

=== Special awards ===
==== Most Popular Male Artist/Group (Popular vote) ====
- **Show Lo**

==== Most Popular Female Artist/Group (Popular vote) ====
- **Jolin Tsai**
