= John McVeigh (Canadian football) =

Canadian football player (1925–2008)

Profile
- Position: T

Personal information
- Born: August 1, 1925
- Died: August 21, 2008 (aged 83); Edmonton, Alberta
- Listed height: 5 ft 11 in (1.80 m)
- Listed weight: 205 lb (93 kg)

Career history
- 1949–1951: Edmonton Eskimos

John Allan McVeigh (August 1, 1925 – August 21, 2008) was a Canadian professional football player who played for the Edmonton Eskimos. He previously played junior football in Edmonton.
