= Opus 69 =

Studio album by David Tao
- Released: August 21, 2009
- Genre: Mandopop, Rock, R&B
- Length: 59:50
- Label: Gold Typhoon (Taiwan)

David Tao chronology
Beautiful (2006)	Opus 69 (2009)	Hello Goodbye (2013)

Opus 69 (69樂章) is the sixth studio album by Taiwanese singer-songwriter David Tao, released August 21, 2009.

The album was awarded one of the Top 10 Selling Mandarin Albums of the Year at the 2009 IFPI Hong Kong Album Sales Awards, presented by the Hong Kong branch of IFPI.

== Track listing ==
No.	English	Chinese	Pinyin	Length
01	Kyrie Eleison	願主憐憫	Yuan Zhu Lian Min	1:35
02	A Big Mess	亂七∞糟	Luan Qi ∞ Zao	5:41
03	Adoration	暗戀	An Lian	5:03
04	Play (ft. 鄭可為 Tay Kewei)	–	–	3:43
05	Zero To Hero	火鳥功 feat. 朱敬然 Andrew Chu	Huo Niao Gong	3:47
06	Surviving Leopards	雪豹 feat. 謝凌君 Lisa Hsieh	Xue Bao	4:43
07	RE:DT	關於陶喆	Guan Yu Tao Zhe	5:18
08	I'm so Stupid	我太傻	Wo Tai Sha	4:24
09	Please Continue to be Stubborn	請繼續，任性	Qing Ji Xu Ren Xing	3:23
10	Chinese Lady	中國姑娘	Zhong Guo Gu Niang	4:38
11	Whose Oscar?	誰的奧斯卡? feat. 謝凌君 Lisa Hsieh	Shui De Ao Si Ka	4:19
12	Love Needed	應徵愛 feat. 謝凌君 Lisa Hsieh	Ying Zheng Ai	3:47
13	Your Song	你的歌	Ni De Ge	4:32
14	Heroes	桂冠英雄	Gui Guan Ying Xiong	4:57
