= David Tao (album) =

Studio album by David Tao
- Released: 6 December 1997
- Genres: Mandopop, R&B
- Length: 50:29
- Language: Mandarin
- Label: Shok Records

David Tao chronology
David Tao (1997)	I'm OK (1999)

David Tao (Chinese: 陶喆) is the self-titled debut studio album by the Taiwanese singer-songwriter David Tao. It was released on 6 December 1997 by Shok Records (Chinese: 俠客唱片).

== Track listing ==
No.	Title	Lyrics	Music	Note	Length
1.	"Airport Take Off"				0:10
2.	"Airport in 10:30" (飛機場的10:30)	David Tao, Wawa			4:40
3.	"Airport Arrival"		David Tao		0:25
4.	"I Love You" (愛，很簡單)	Wawa	David Tao		4:29
5.	"Blue Moon" (沙灘)	Wawa	David Tao		3:59
6.	"Our Love" (十七歲)	Wawa	David Tao		4:21
7.	"Spring Wind" (望春風)	Lee Lim-chhiu, Wawa	Teng Yu-hsien, David Tao	Rewitten from the Taiwanese Hokkien song Bāng Chhun-hong	2:58
8.	"Bastard" (王八蛋)	David Tao, Wawa	David Tao		4:14
9.	"Yes No Song" (是是非非)	David Tao, Wawa	David Tao		4:07
10.	"Everything's Gone" (流沙)	Wawa	David Tao		4:02
11.	"Take 6 Minus 3"				0:16
12.	"Do I Do I" (心亂飛)	Wawa	David Tao		3:40
13.	"Say Goodbye" (再見以前先說再見)	Wawa	David Tao		4:32
14.	"Suite Blue Moon (piano version)" (沙灘(鋼琴版))	Wawa	David Tao		3:53
15.	"Answering Machine"				4:53
Total length:					50:29
