= Hello Goodbye (David Tao album) =

Hello Goodbye 再見你好嗎

Studio album by David Tao
- Released: June 11, 2013
- Genre: Mandopop, Rock, R&B
- Length: 53:41
- Label: Seed Music

David Tao chronology
Opus 69 (2009)	Hello Goodbye 再見你好嗎 (2013)	Stupid Pop Song (2025)

Hello Goodbye (再見你好嗎) is the seventh studio album by Taiwanese singer-songwriter David Tao, released June 11, 2013.

== Track listing ==
No.	English	Chinese	Length
01	Hello	–	0:19
02	Forget Me Not	勿忘我	4:15
03	Blink of the Heart	一念之間	4:39
04	Brothers feat. Crowd Lu	逗陣兄弟 feat. 盧廣仲	5:06
05	Birds of a Feather feat. Tanya Chua	真愛等一下 feat. 蔡健雅	4:46
06	Time To Say Goodbye feat. Sharon Kwan	好好說再見	4:08
07	Songs From Yesterday	上愛唱的歌	4:38
08	What A Girl feat. Crowd Lu	那個女孩 feat. 盧廣仲	4:27
09	The Promise	–	4:30
10	Just Love	因為愛	3:32
11	My Everything	小小的你	3:28
12	All For Joy feat. Sharon Kwan	–	4:18
13	Brothers	逗陣兄弟	5:35
