= I'm OK (album) =

Studio album by David Tao
- Released: 10 December 1999
- Recorded: 1999
- Genres: Mandopop; R&B
- Language: Mandarin
- Label: Shok Records

David Tao chronology
David Tao (1997)	I'm OK (1999)	Black Tangerine (2002)

I'm OK is Taiwanese Mandopop playing singer-songwriter David Tao's second Mandarin studio album. It was released on 10 December 1999, by Shok Records (Chinese: 俠客唱片).

The album was nominated as the Best Mandarin Album, won the Best Album Producer and the track "找自己" (Rain) was nominated for Best Music Video, Best Composer and Best Arrangement at the 11th Golden Melody Awards, Taiwan in 2000.

The tracks "普通朋友" (Regular Friends) and "找自己" (Rain) are listed at number 8 and 44 respectively on Hit Fm Taiwan's Hit Fm Annual Top 100 Singles Char (Hit-Fm年度百首單曲) for 2000.

== Track listing ==
No.	Title	Lyrics	Music	Arranger(s)	Length
1.	"Doxology"		David Tao		0:50
2.	"Rain" (找自己)	David Tao	David Tao		5:07
3.	"Small Town Girl" (小鎮姑娘)	David Tao	David Tao		4:58
4.	"Tuberose" (夜來香)	Li Jinguang	Li Jinguang		4:21
5.	"Regular Friends" (普通朋友)	David Tao, Wawa	David Tao		4:17
6.	"I'm OK"	David Tao	David Tao		4:18
7.	"Different" (不一樣)	David Tao	David Tao		4:45
8.	"Leave" (說走就走)	David Tao	David Tao		5:49
9.	"Thank You" (多謝你)	David Tao	David Tao		4:18
10.	"Circus" (馬戲團)	David Tao	David Tao		4:21
11.	"Close to You" (天天)	Wawa	David Tao	4:17
12.	"Angeline"	David Tao, Sunny Sun	David Tao		5:00
13.	"Amen"	David Tao	David Tao		0:32
Total length:					48:10

== Awards ==
Golden Melody Awards
Year	Number	Award	Nomination	Result	Ref.
2000	11th	Best Mandarin Album	I'm OK	Nominated	
2000	11th	Best Music Video	"找自己" (Rain)	Nominated	
2000	11th	Best Composer	"找自己" (Rain)	Nominated	
2000	11th	Best Arrangement	"找自己" (Rain)	Nominated	
2000	11th	Best Album Producer	I'm OK	Won	

== Charts ==
=== Weekly charts ===
Chart (2000)	Peak position
Hong Kong Albums (IFPI Hong Kong)	7
Malaysian Albums (RIM)	4
