= Black Tangerine =

Studio album by David Tao
- Released: 9 August 2002
- Genre: Rock, Mandopop, R&B
- Label: Shock Records

David Tao chronology
I'm OK (1999)	Black Tangerine (2002)	Ultrasound 1997–2003 (2003)

Black Tangerine (Chinese: 黑色柳丁) is the third studio album by Taiwanese singer-songwriter David Tao, released 9 August 2002.

The album was awarded one of the Top 10 Selling Mandarin Albums of the Year at the 2002 IFPI Hong Kong Album Sales Awards, presented by the Hong Kong branch of IFPI.

== Track listing ==
No.	Title	Lyrics	Music	Length
1.	"Black Tangerine" (黑色柳丁)	David Tao, Wawa	David Tao	4:17
2.	"The World Today" (今天晚間新聞)			2:17
3.	"Dear God"	David Tao, Wawa	David Tao	5:31
4.	"Angel"	David Tao, Wawa	David Tao	3:54
5.	"Let's Fall in Love" (討厭紅樓夢)	David Tao, Wawa	David Tao	4:04
6.	"Butterfly" (蝴蝶)	David Tao, Wawa	David Tao, Brad Olynyk	4:45
7.	"Kung Pao Chicken" (宮保雞丁; featuring Andrew Chu)	David Tao, Wawa	Andrew Chu, David Tao	3:59
8.	"Melody"	David Tao, Wawa	David Tao	4:31
9.	"Moon over My Heart" (月亮代表誰的心)	David Tao, Sun Yi, Wawa	David Tao, Tony Weng	3:27
10.	"22" (二十二)	David Tao, Wawa	David Tao	4:24
11.	"My Anata" (featuring Yuri Koike)	David Tao, Wawa	David Tao	3:49
12.	"Lullaby" (搖籃曲)	David Tao, Wawa	David Tao	4:17
13.	"Katrina (demo)"	David Tao	David Tao	4:27
Total length:				53:12
