= The Great Leap (David Tao album) =

- The Great Leap cover

Studio album 太平盛世 by David Tao
- Released: 10 January 2005
- Genre: Mandopop, R&B, Hard rock
- Length: 47:48
- Language: Mandarin, English
- Label: EMI Music Taiwan

David Tao chronology
Ultrasound 1997–2003 (2003)	The Great Leap (2005)	Beautiful (2006)

The Great Leap (Chinese: 太平盛世; pinyin: Tài Píng Shèng Shì) is Taiwanese Mandopop singer-songwriter David Tao's fourth Mandarin studio album. It was released on 10 January 2005 by EMI Music Taiwan.

The track "Susan 說" (Susan Said) was nominated for Top 10 Gold Songs at the Hong Kong TVB8 Awards, presented by television station TVB8, in 2005.

The album was awarded one of the Top 10 Selling Mandarin Albums of the Year at the 2005 IFPI Hong Kong Album Sales Awards, presented by the Hong Kong branch of IFPI.

== Track listing ==
#	English name	Chinese name	Pinyin	Length
1	Ghost Overture	鬼	Guǐ	0:56
2	Ghost	鬼	Guǐ	3:50
3	Catherine	—	—	3:52
4	Love Can	就是愛你	Jiù Shì ài Nǐ	4:24
5	The Art of War	孫子兵法	Sūn Zi Bīng Fǎ	3:57
6	Who Do You Love?	愛我還是他	ài Wǒ Hái Shì Tā	4:55
7	Susan Said	Susan 說	Susan Shuō	4:24
8	Fated	無緣	Wú Yuán	4:19
9	Sula & Lampa	Sula與Lampa的寓言		3:19
10	2Night	藏愛	Cáng ài	3:54
11	Song for Anita	她的歌	Tā De Gē	4:11
12	What's Love?	愛是個什麼東西	ài Shì Gè Shí Me Dōng Xī	4:46
13	Sweet Hour of Prayer	禱告良辰歌	Dǎo Gào Liáng Chén Gē	3:34
