= John McVey =

American singer-songwriter

- John McVey at Coupe Studios, Boulder, CO; January 15, 2011

Background information
- Born: John McVey; November 18, 1959 (age 66); New Jersey, United States
- Genres: Folk rock
- Occupations: Musician, songwriter
- Instruments: Guitar, vocals, bass, mandolin
- Years active: 1980s–present
- Website: johnmcvey.com

John McVey (born John McVey Criscitiello; November 18, 1959) is an American folk rock singer-songwriter from Princeton, New Jersey. His style of music is part of the new folk acoustic movement, bringing elements of pop, rock and folk music to modern audiences. Now living in Colorado, local magazine 5280 describes McVey by saying, "McVey's smooth yet lightly smoky voice create a soft rock, adult contemporary sound that draws worthy comparisons to Marc Cohn, Shawn Colvin, and Daryl Hall".

== Beginnings ==
McVey began playing guitar and writing songs in grade school, and was a regular performer in high school. He was completely self-taught until college, where he majored in music, studying guitar with classical performer Edward Flower at Ithaca College. Later he studied under jazz guitarist Ted Dunbar at Rutgers University, who played with jazz greats Sonny Rollins, McCoy Tyner, Tony Williams and Gil Evans. McVey graduated from Rutgers with a BA and immediately began pursuing music professionally. He worked as a piano tuner while launching his songwriting and performing career.

In 1991, he and his first band won the Marlboro Music Talent Roundup in Philadelphia. The band won a trip to Nashville to compete with winners from other cities and open for Joe Ely.

He released his first independent CD, Circle of Friends in 1994. The album was produced by Alain Mallet, then husband of Jonatha Brooke. Brooke and McVey became friends and the connection would prove to be enduring. The two would collaborate on multiple recordings throughout the years. Most notable on Circle of Friends is a duet of I Want to Hold Your Hand, a cover of the Beatles song.

== Nashville and beyond ==
In 1995, he moved to Nashville to engross himself in the songwriting community. There, he quickly gained recognition as an emerging talent. Country Music Television reflected on McVey's arrival by saying, "When John McVey decided to become a full-time musician, he kicked down the doors of the songwriting community". He was soon asked to play an 'in the round' at the famed Bluebird Café. His regular gigs at the Bluebird continued to help him build and network in the Nashville community. Although his style was more folk rock than country, he was chosen to be part of the touring band for country star Lari White. As her acoustic guitarist and background singer, McVey and White headlined with and opened for acts such as Travis Tritt, Marty Stewart and Vince Gill.

In 1996, he won the Kerrville Folk Festival's New Folk Contest, and was discovered by BWE Music. He was signed by the Salt Lake City based independent label (a subsidiary of Bonneville Worldwide Entertainment) and Circle of Friends was re-released in 1997 on the BWE label, with the addition of a few new songs, including, perhaps oddly, the title track. This brought Johns music to a broader audience and allowed him to establish connections which would lead to future collaboration. During the late 90s, he was a finalist in several other festival contests, including the Rocky Mountain Folks Festival in Colorado and the Napa Valley Music Festival in California. In 1997 he was named Artist of The Year by The National Academy of Songwriters.

== Genre ==
After being signed to BWE, John moved to Park City, Utah. His touring schedule was extensive, but he maintained a studio presence and did session recordings with artists such as: Felicia Sorenson, Nancy Hanson, Jenny Frogly, Sam Cardon and Kurt Bestor. He also penned songs for True North and several EFY (Especially for Youth) projects. All of this was work done for hire. In spite of this fact, since artists and record companies were eager to use his name as well as his talents on their projects, McVey has been listed as a "Christian" artist even though his music and message have never been religious in nature.

== "Daddy" ==
McVey has also been a major presence in the world of children's music education. In 1988, John met Ken Guilmartin, founder of Music Together, Inc, and was asked to be a part of an early recording. Since then, McVey has been part of every CD released by Music Together, and is the "daddy" in the virtual family depicted on the CDs. He has also participated in live shows at the Director's Conferences.

== Artist and producer ==
In 2000, McVey released his second CD, Jigsaw. He again worked with producer Alain Mallet, guitarist Duke Levine (Mary Chapin Carpenter, Ellis Paul) and bassist Mike Rivard (Paula Cole), this time adding drummer Dave Mattacks (Paul McCartney, Fairport Convention). This CD was released by Native Language Music and distributed by NAVAR.

Throughout the late 1990s and early 2000s, while touring extensively, McVey had begun producing albums for local and national artists in the folk rock genre. He was noticed by Coupe Studios, and in 2002 was hired on as a producer and engineer. McVey settled in Boulder, Colorado and has produced hundreds of projects, working with CO artists such as Chuck Pyle, Angie Stevens, Driftwood Fire, Paper Bird and Hazel Miller. Known for his vocal coaching and arranging skills, he also plays guitars, bass, keyboards and other instruments on these projects.

John has also created original music and done production for commercials. He has written and performed in national ad spots, including the TELE award-winning Umpire spot, a 60-second public service announcement for The Foundation for a Better Life. He has also written and produced commercials for The US Ski Team, Dish Network, The Idaho Lottery, Ford and many more.

== Present ==
In 2008, between producing projects for other artists, McVey began writing and producing songs for his third CD, Unpredictable. The CD was released in 2010. It is self produced and has gained much critical acclaim for the artist/producer. The Planet Weekly stated that, "John McVey's Unpredictable…is Americana with heavy soul and folk influences". Denver's Westword newspaper was quoted as saying, "Not only does Unpredictable sound remarkable, but the album feels unhurried".

== Discography ==
Title	Producer	Label	Date
Circle of Friends	Alain Mallet	BWE	1997
Jigsaw	Alain Mallet	Native Language	2000
Unpredictable	John McVey	Self	2010
