= Beautiful (David Tao album) =

- Beautiful cover

Studio album by David Tao
- Released: 4 August 2006
- Genres: Mandopop, R&B
- Length: 49:46
- Language: Mandarin
- Label: EMI Music Taiwan

David Tao chronology
The Great Leap (2005)	Beautiful (2006)	Opus 69 (2009)

Beautiful (Chinese: 太美麗; lit. 'Too Beautiful') is the fifth studio album by the Taiwanese Mandopop singer-songwriter David Tao. It was released on 4 August 2006 by EMI Music Taiwan.

The album features a mid-tempo duet, "今天妳要嫁給我" (Marry Me Today), with Jolin Tsai. It was awarded Best Song of the Year at the 18th Golden Melody Awards in 2007, and Best Loved by Audience and one of the Top 10 Songs of the Year at the 2007 HITO Radio Music Awards, presented by Taiwanese radio station Hit FM. The track, "似曾相識" (Finally) won Best Composer award for Tao also at the 2007 HITO Radio Music Awards.

The tracks "忘不了" (Can't Get You Outta My Mind) and "太美麗" (Too Beautiful) were nominated for Top 10 Gold Songs at the Hong Kong TVB8 Awards, presented by television station TVB8, in 2006.

The album was awarded one of the Top 10 Selling Mandarin Albums of the Year at the 2006 IFPI Hong Kong Album Sales Awards, presented by the Hong Kong branch of IFPI.

== Track listing ==
No.	Title	Lyrics	Music	Note	Length
1.	"Too Beautiful Radio Station" (太美麗廣播電台)		David Tao		0:16
2.	"Can't Get You Outta My Mind" (忘不了)	David Tao, Wawa	David Tao	Inspired from the Mandarin song Love without End	3:58
3.	"Too Beautiful" (太美麗)	David Tao, Doe Ching, Wawa	David Tao, Mok Yin		4:55
4.	"The Chase" (追)	David Ke	David Tao		3:29
5.	"The Moment" (那一瞬間)	Wawa	David Tao		4:04
6.	"Walk On"	David Ke, David Tao	David Tao		3:05
7.	"How Long" (自導自演的悲劇)	David Tao, Wawa	David Tao		4:07
8.	"I Don't Wanna Know" (祝妳幸福)	David Tao, Wawa	David Tao		3:57
9.	"Finally" (似曾相識)	David Tao, Wawa	David Tao		4:43
10.	"Marry Me Today" (今天妳要嫁給我; featuring Jolin Tsai)	David Tao, Wawa	David Tao		4:32
11.	"So Beautiful" (每一面都美)	David Tao	David Tao		4:30
12.	"Forever" (不愛)	David Ke	Andrew Chu, Josh Chen		3:25
13.	"Olia"	David Tao, Francis Lee	David Tao		4:45
Total length:					49:46
