= David Tao =

Taiwanese singer-songwriter (born 1969)

- 陶喆
- Tao in 2013
- Born: July 11, 1969 (age 57); British Hong Kong
- Education: University of California, Irvine; University of California, Los Angeles (BA)
- Occupation: Singer-songwriter
- Years active: 1997–present
- Spouse: Penny Chiang
- Father: Tao Dawei
- Musical career
- Origin: Taiwan
- Genres: Mandopop; Rhythm and blues; Rock
- Instruments: Vocals; guitar; piano
- Labels: Shock Records (1997–2004); Capitol (2005–2007); Gold Typhoon (2007–2009); Seed Music (2012–2021); Universal Taiwan (2025-current)

Chinese name
- Chinese: 陶喆
Transcriptions
Standard Mandarin
- Hanyu Pinyin: Táo Zhé
Southern Min
- Hokkien POJ: Tô Tiat

David Tao (Chinese: 陶喆; pinyin: Táo Zhé; Tâi-lô: Tô Tiat ; born July 11, 1969) is a Taiwanese singer-songwriter. His signature style incorporates R&B and rock. Tao's accolades include six Golden Melody Awards in Taiwan.

== Biography ==
David Tao was born on July 11, 1969, in Hong Kong, to parents who were entertainers in Taiwan. His father, Tao Dawei (David Tao Sr.; September 28, 1942 – September 12, 2012), was an actor, singer, composer, and TV host; his mother, Wang Furong (Catherine), is a Chinese opera singer.

Tao spent part of his childhood in Hong Kong. He was educated in Taiwan from kindergarten through junior high at the Bethany Campus of Morrison Academy in Taipei. His family relocated to Arcadia, California, while his father pursued a career with Disney. Tao attended Arcadia High School.

Tao's parents later returned to Taiwan, where his father began his singing career, leaving him to complete his education in the United States. Left to fend for himself, Tao took on many jobs, including a stint as a civilian employee at the Los Angeles Police Department without the knowledge of his parents. He attended the University of California, Irvine, first. He graduated with a Bachelor of Arts in psychology from the University of California, Los Angeles.

In July 2015, Tao held a press conference in Taipei addressing reports about his private life and acknowledged he had dated Chinese artist manager Yang Ziqing prior to his marriage, a story that received wide media coverage at the time.

In 2024, Tao returned to large-scale concert touring with the Soul Power II tour, announcing and staging dates across Taiwan and the surrounding region, including shows in Taipei, Kaohsiung, and Macau.

== Career ==
Whilst working as a salesman, Tao was offered a job by Taiwanese producer Wang Chih-ping and went back to Taiwan, initially writing and later producing songs for many singers before releasing his self-titled album David Tao in 1997. He has since released six more albums, a live concert recording, and a compilation of his best songs. Tao is a prolific composer and songwriter and has written songs for fellow artists such as A-Mei and S.H.E.

=== David Tao (1997) ===
In 1997, with the help of Wang and another Taiwanese producer, Jim Lee, Tao released his self-titled first album (David Tao), under an independent label called Shock Records, set up by Taiwanese pop singer Jin Ruei-yao and her husband. This album set a record in Taiwan during the 9th Golden Melody Awards as the first album from a new singer ever to be nominated for a total of five awards: Best Newcomer, Best Singer, Best Producer, Best Song, and Best Album.

"Airport 10.30" and "I Love You" were popular songs from the album. The album also featured an a cappella track sung entirely by Tao, "Spring Wind", which was a "modern" R&B version of "Bāng Chhun-hong", a famous Taiwanese folk song.

"Airport 10.30" was also nominated for the MTV Awards for Best Chinese Video in 1998 along with Coco Lee, who became the eventual winner.

Tao won two of the awards, namely Best Newcomer and Best Producer, becoming the first newcomer to also win the Best Producer award. Tao's first album was produced entirely at his home in Los Angeles. The album experimented in musical style and arrangement with its distinctly Western R&B sound.

Between David Tao and his next album, besides releasing a remixed Bastard Pop EP, he wrote and produced songs for various hit Taiwanese singers, notably a theme song which became one of Taiwanese boy-band Tension's hit songs, "I'll Be With You".

=== I'm OK (1999) ===
In 1999, two years after his first album, Tao released his second album I'm OK. This sold 600,000 copies, yet various critics had claimed that the impact of I'm OK was not any stronger than his previous work in terms of style and arrangement.

Notable hits include:

- Rock ballad "Rain, Angeline"
- Country-flavored "Small Town Girl"
- R&B-influenced "Just a Friend"
- "Leave", a soul number.
- "Close to You", a love ballad.
- "Tuberose", an a cappella remake of a traditional Chinese song.

Tao was nominated for six GMA awards for I'm OK – Best Album, Best Producer, Best Singer, Best Video, Best Song and Best Song Arrangement. He only won the Best Producer Award on the GMA, but "Rain" later went on to win Best Chinese Video at the 2000 MTV Music Awards.

=== Black Tangerine (2002) ===
In 2002, Tao released Black Tangerine. Some notable songs in this post-9/11 album, of which he derived much of his inspiration from:

- "Black Tangerine", a rock song.
- "Moon Over My Heart", an updated old Mandarin hit re-rendered in R&B style.
- "My Anata", a Japanese-influenced rock number.
- "Angel", a love ballad.
- "22", a tune depicting the woes of a girl in crossroads.
- "Butterfly", a song which he penned about his relationship with God.
- "Katrina", a surprise demo he wrote and sang entirely in English.
- "Dear God", a song he wrote for 911.
- "Melody", a song for an important woman in his life.

What set Black Tangerine apart was the strong social commentary, including a track consisting of various actual Taiwanese news snippets of unrelated family tragedies and public incidents, placing the state of Taiwanese society in a somewhat negative point of view.

Black Tangerine won various awards in Asia but was incidentally overlooked for the Golden Melody Awards in Taiwan, for which the album was originally intended.

Tao has since held a series of concerts in Hong Kong, Taiwan, Malaysia and Singapore in 2003.

=== The Great Leap (2005) ===
In 2005, Tao released his fourth album, The Great Leap. It earned four nominations at 17th Golden Melody Awards and won the "Best Album Award".

Notable songs in the album include:

- "Ghost" (鬼), the first single of the album, a mix of '80s disco synth with Linkin Park-esque metal and rap elements. The lyrical style, a continuation of the social commentary from the previous album, describes a person's fears among a mass media-driven society that is getting too close for comfort.
- "Susan Said" (Susan 說), a track that combines Beijing Opera's unique singing accent and instrumental arrangement with Tao's signature R&B style.
- "Love Can" (就是愛你), A sing-along ballad about love, similar to "I Love You" from his debut album.
- "Who Do You Love" (愛我還是他), The first ballad single off the album.
- "Art of War" (孫子兵法), a rock song nominated for Best Arrangement in 2006's Taiwan 17th Golden Melody Awards, featuring the "12 Girls Band" (女子十二樂坊). Tao and co-arranger Goh Kheng Long fused hard metal and traditional Chinese instruments into a song leaden with socially critical lyrics.

=== Beautiful (2006) ===
On August 4, 2006, Tau released his fifth album, Beautiful. The album earned nominations for Best Song, Best Composer and Best Male Vocalist in the 18th Golden Melody Awards. The song "Marry Me Today," a duet with Jolin Tsai, won Best Song. Among the more popular songs in the album are the title song "Too Beautiful", another old song restyled into Tao's signature arrangement, "Can't Get You Outta My Mind", and "Marry Me Today".

=== Opus 69 (2009) ===
On August 21, 2009, Tao released his sixth album, Opus 69, named after his birth year of 1969. He developed the album with a blend of R&B, rock and soft ballads.

=== Hello Goodbye (2013) ===
On June 11, 2013, Tau released his seventh album, Hello Goodbye.

== Personal life ==
Tao speaks Mandarin, English, and Cantonese.

Tao married Penny Chiang on August 31, 2014. It was revealed in 2015 that Tao had engaged in an extramarital affair with artist manager Ada Yang Zi Qing, whom he had first met at a post-concert celebratory dinner in late 2010, which continued even after his 2014 marriage with Chiang. When the website Quan Min Xing Tan published an interview with Yang which revealed their affair though WeChat chat screenshots in June 2015, Tao denied the cheating and threatened to file charges against Yang and the publishing website for the "malicious lies." However, Yang responded with a vow to release more evidence of her affair with Tao, and challenged him to file the charges, saying she too could afford to hire a lawyer.

On July 7, 2015, Tao held a press conference with his agent and lawyer, where he admitted that he was cheating on his wife with Yang.

Tao and Penny Chiang have a son, born in 2019.

== Discography ==
- David Tao (1997)
- I'm OK (1999)
- Black Tangerine (2002)
- The Great Leap (2005)
- Beautiful (2006)
- Opus 69 (2009)
- Hello Goodbye (2013)
- Stupid Pop Songs (2025)

== Awards and nominations ==
Golden Melody Awards
Year	Number	Award	Nomination	Result	Ref.
1998	9th	Best Mandarin Album	David Tao	Nominated	
1998	9th	Best Male Mandarin Artist	David Tao for David Tao	Nominated	
1998	9th	Best Album Producer	David Tao	Won	
1998	9th	Best Composer	"沙灘" (Blue Moon)	Nominated	
1998	9th	Best New Artist	David Tao for David Tao	Won	
2000	11th	Best Mandarin Album	I'm OK	Nominated	
2000	11th	Best Male Mandarin Artist	David Tao for I'm OK	Nominated	
2000	11th	Best Album Producer	I'm OK	Won	
2000	11th	Best Composer	"找自己" (Rain)	Nominated	
2000	11th	Best Arrangement	"找自己" (Rain)	Nominated	
2000	11th	Best Music Video	"找自己" (Rain)	Nominated	
2003	14th	Best Male Mandarin Artist	David Tao for Black Tangerine	Nominated	
2004	15th	Best Male Mandarin Artist	David Tao for Ultrasound 1997–2003	Nominated	
2006	17th	Best Mandarin Album	The Great Leap	Won	
2006	17th	Best Song of the Year	"孫子兵法" (The Art of War)	Nominated	
2006	17th	Best Male Mandarin Artist	David Tao for The Great Leap	Nominated	
2006	17th	Best Album Producer	The Great Leap	Nominated	
2006	17th	Best Arrangement	"孫子兵法" (The Art of War)	Nominated	
2006	17th	Best Music Video	"鬼" (Ghost)	Nominated	
2007	18th	Best Song of the Year	"今天妳要嫁給我" (Marry Me Today) feat. Jolin Tsai from Beautiful	Won	
2007	18th	Best Composer	David Tao for "今天妳要嫁給我" (Marry Me Today) from Beautiful	Nominated	
2007	18th	Best Male Mandarin Artist	David Tao for Beautiful	Nominated	
2010	21st	Best Male Mandarin Artist	David Tao for Opus 69	Won	

Hito Radio Music Awards
Year	Category	Nomination	Result	Ref.
2007	Best Producer	David Tao	Won	
2007	Best Composer	"似曾相識" (Finally)	Won	
2007	Best Loved by Audience	"今天妳要嫁給我" (Marry Me Today)	Won	
2007	Top 10 Songs of the Year	"今天妳要嫁給我" (Marry Me Today)	Won	
