= List of Eason Chan concert tours =

Eason Chan concert tours
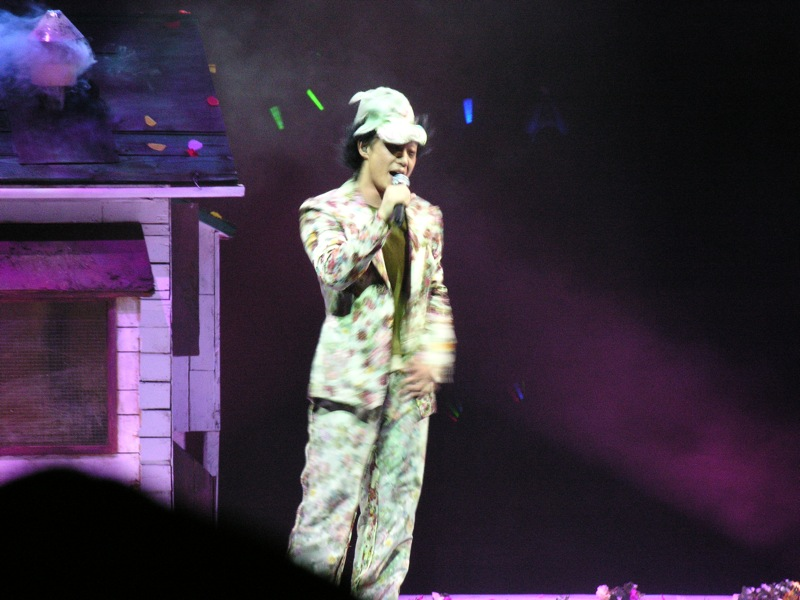
- Chan during the Get a Life Concert in 2006
- Concert tours: 6
- Promotional concert tours: 4

This is a list of concert tours by Hong Kong recording artist Eason Chan. His first series of four concerts at the Hong Kong Coliseum, Eason's 99 Big Live, came four years after his debut in 1995. That amount of time was considered short for a new singer to gain general approval and public support needed to perform at the venue. He embarked on his first world tour in 2007, titled the Eason's Moving on Stage World Tour.

As of January 2023, Chan held over 110 concerts at Hong Kong Coliseum.

== Concert tours ==
Title	Date(s)	Continent(s)	Shows	Attendance	Ref.
Third Encounter Concert	16 February 2003 – 29 November 2003	Asia; Oceania; North America	12	—	
Eason Chan Get a Life Concert	11 February 2006 – 26 August 2006	Asia	10	—	
Eason's Moving on Stage World Tour	24 October 2007 – 16 August 2009	Asia; North America; Oceania	44	—	
Duo World Tour	20 March 2010 – 20 December 2012	Asia; North America; Oceania; Europe	66	—	
Eason's Life World Tour	6 July 2013 – 22 October 2016	Asia; North America; Oceania; Europe	135	—	
Fear and Dreams World Tour	9 December 2022 – 17 April 2025	Asia; North America; Oceania; Europe	158	—	

== Promotional tours ==
Title	Date(s)	Location	Shows
Eason 90 Minutes of Fun	27 November 2009 – 11 September 2010	China	7
European Concert 2010	3 May 2010 – 8 May 2010	United Kingdom; Netherlands	3
Feel Free! Feel Music! Concert	24 August 2012 – 29 December 2012	Hong Kong; China	6
Eason Says C'mon in~Tour	22 September 2017 – 3 December 2017	Asia; North America; Oceania; Europe	19

== One-off concerts ==
Title	Date(s)	Location	Shows
My Happy Times Concert	8 March 1998 – 10 March 1998	Hong Kong Arts Centre	3
Big Live Eason Chan Solo Concert 99	7 October 1999 – 10 October 1999	Hong Kong Coliseum	4
The Easy Ride Concert	9 November 2001 – 17 November 2001	Hong Kong Coliseum	9
2005 Attack Eason Chan Guangzhou Concert	30 July 2005	Tianhe Stadium, Guangzhou	1
Eason Chan Shanghai Concert 2006	25 December 2006	Shanghai Grand Stage	1
Eason Chan Live in Singapore 2007	6 January 2007	Singapore Expo	1
Eason Chan 2010 Beijing Ten Years Concert	29 April 2010 – 30 April 2010	Workers' Stadium, Beijing	2

== Moving on Stage World Tour ==
The Moving on Stage World Tour began in Hong Kong in February 2008. He traveled to Taiwan, Canada, Australia, Guangzhou, Shanghai, Malaysia, Macau, Singapore, Kunming, Tianjin, Chongqing, Shenzhen, Los Angeles, San Francisco, Hangzhou, Guiyang, Beijing, and Foshan. The Moving on Stage World Tour ended with Eason Chan's Moving on Stage 26 at Kuala Lumpur, Malaysia, on 16 August 2009.

List of concert dates
Date	City	Country	Venue
24 October 2007	Hong Kong		Hong Kong Coliseum
25 October 2007	Hong Kong		Hong Kong Coliseum
26 October 2007	Hong Kong		Hong Kong Coliseum
27 October 2007	Hong Kong		Hong Kong Coliseum
28 October 2007	Hong Kong		Hong Kong Coliseum
29 October 2007	Hong Kong		Hong Kong Coliseum
30 October 2007	Hong Kong		Hong Kong Coliseum
31 October 2007	Hong Kong		Hong Kong Coliseum
1 November 2007	Hong Kong		Hong Kong Coliseum
2 November 2007	Hong Kong		Hong Kong Coliseum
3 November 2007	Hong Kong		Hong Kong Coliseum
4 November 2007	Hong Kong		Hong Kong Coliseum
5 November 2007	Hong Kong		Hong Kong Coliseum
6 November 2007	Hong Kong		Hong Kong Coliseum
9 November 2007	Hong Kong		Hong Kong Coliseum
10 November 2007	Hong Kong		Hong Kong Coliseum
2 February 2008	Taipei	Taiwan	Zhongshan Football Field
9 February 2008	Uncasville	United States	Mohegan Sun Arena
10 February 2008	Uncasville	United States	Mohegan Sun Arena
12 February 2008	Toronto	Canada	Air Canada Centre
20 March 2008	Sydney	Australia	Sydney Entertainment Centre
22 March 2008	Melbourne	Australia	Victoria Arts Centre
19 April 2008	Guangzhou	China	Tianhe Stadium
26 April 2008	Shanghai	China	Shanghai Stadium
14 June 2008	Kuala Lumpur	Malaysia	Stadium Merdeka
18 July 2008	Macau		The Venetian Macao Resort Hotel
19 July 2008	Macau		The Venetian Macao Resort Hotel
26 July 2008	Singapore		Singapore Indoor Stadium
2 August 2008	Kunming	China	Tuodong Stadium
28 September 2008	Beijing	China	Workers Stadium
8 November 2008	Tianjin	China	Tianjin Olympic Sports Center Stadium
15 November 2008	Chongqing	China	Chongqing Olympic Sports Center
22 November 2008	Shenzhen	China	Shenzhen Stadium
21 March 2009	Los Angeles	United States	Agua Caliente Casino & Resort
22 March 2009	San Francisco	United States	Cow Palace
25 April 2009	Shanghai	China	Hongkou Football Stadium
30 April 2009	Suzhou	China	Suzhou Sports Center
29 May 2009	Taipei	Taiwan	Taipei Arena
30 May 2009	Taipei	Taiwan	Taipei Arena
20 June 2009	Guiyang	China	Guiyang Olympic Sports Center
11 July 2009	Foshan	China	Foshan Century Lotus Sports Center
18 July 2009	Beijing	China	Beijing Workers' Stadium
25 July 2009	Guangzhou	China	Guangzhou Gymnasium
16 August 2009	Kuala Lumpur	Malaysia	Sunway Lagoon Surf Beach

== Duo World Tour ==
The Duo World Tour began in Hong Kong in March 2010. At Chan's concert in Beijing on 29 September 2011 at the Beijing Workers' Stadium, Faye Wong made a special guest appearance, surprising many as Wong had not previously accepted any invitations to appear as a special guest at another singer's concert; this was the first time that she did so.

Continuing his Duo Eason Chan 2010 Concert World Tour, Chan made his second appearance in London, the O2 Arena on 23 April 2012. He became the first Chinese artist playing in the O2 stage. The concert was sold out in twenty minutes to 12,000 fans crashing the venue's web servers.

List of concert dates
Date	City	Country	Venue
20 March 2010	Hong Kong		Hong Kong Coliseum
21 March 2010	Hong Kong		Hong Kong Coliseum
22 March 2010	Hong Kong		Hong Kong Coliseum
23 March 2010	Hong Kong		Hong Kong Coliseum
24 March 2010	Hong Kong		Hong Kong Coliseum
25 March 2010	Hong Kong		Hong Kong Coliseum
26 March 2010	Hong Kong		Hong Kong Coliseum
27 March 2010	Hong Kong		Hong Kong Coliseum
28 March 2010	Hong Kong		Hong Kong Coliseum
29 March 2010	Hong Kong		Hong Kong Coliseum
30 March 2010	Hong Kong		Hong Kong Coliseum
31 March 2010	Hong Kong		Hong Kong Coliseum
1 April 2010	Hong Kong		Hong Kong Coliseum
2 April 2010	Hong Kong		Hong Kong Coliseum
3 April 2010	Hong Kong		Hong Kong Coliseum
4 April 2010	Hong Kong		Hong Kong Coliseum
5 April 2010	Hong Kong		Hong Kong Coliseum
6 April 2010	Hong Kong		Hong Kong Coliseum
18 September 2010	Singapore		Singapore Indoor Stadium
2 October 2010	Sydney	Australia	Sydney Entertainment Centre
3 October 2010	Melbourne	Australia	Palladium at Crown
11 December 2010	Macau		Cotai Arena
14 December 2010	Vancouver	Canada	Rogers Arena
16 December 2010	Toronto	Canada	Hershey Centre
25 December 2010	Las Vegas	United States	MGM Grand Garden Arena
26 December 2010	San Francisco	United States	Nob Hill Masonic Center
14 January 2011	Taipei	Taiwan	Taipei Arena
15 January 2011	Taipei	Taiwan	Taipei Arena
29 January 2011	Kaohsiung	Taiwan	Kaohsiung Arena
16 April 2011	Chengdu	China	Chengdu Sports Center
18 May 2011	Auckland	New Zealand	Trusts Stadium
20 May 2011	Perth	Australia	Challenge Stadium
17 June 2011	Wenzhou	China	Wenzhou Sports Center
18 June 2011	Wenzhou	China	Wenzhou Sports Center
6 August 2011	Kuala Lumpur	Malaysia	Stadium Merdeka
3 September 2011	Changzhou	China	Changzhou Olympic Sports Center
17 September 2011	Xiamen	China	Xiamen Sports Center
29 September 2011	Beijing	China	Workers Stadium
15 October 2011	Shanghai	China	Hongkou Football Stadium
12 November 2011	Taichung	Taiwan	National Taiwan Institute of Physical Education Stadium
24 December 2011	Guangzhou	China	Tianhe Stadium
31 December 2011	Fuzhou	China	Fujian Sports Center
23 April 2012	London	England	The O2 Arena
4 May 2012	Zhengzhou	China	Nautical Stadium
11 May 2012	Xi'an	China	Shaanxi Provincial Stadium
18 May 2012	Wuhan	China	Wuhan Sports Center
26 May 2012	Changsha	China	He Long Sports and Culture Center
2 June 2012	Chongqing	China	Chongqing Olympic Sports Center
9 June 2012	Mianyang	China	Mianyang Nanhe Sports Center
23 June 2012	Kunming	China	Tuodong Stadium
30 June 2012	Nanning	China	Guangxi Sports Center
7 July 2012	Shenzhen	China	Shenzhen Bay Sports Center
14 July 2012	Quanzhou	China	Quanzhou Strait Sports Center Stadium
21 July 2012	Hefei	China	Hefei Olympic Sports Center
1 September 2012	Hangzhou	China	Huanglong Sports Center Stadium
8 September 2012	Nanjing	China	Nanjing Olympic Sports Center
15 September 2012	Tianjin	China	Tianjin Olympic Center Stadium
22 September 2012	Jinan	China	Jinan Olympic Sports Center Stadium
30 September 2012	Foshan	China	Foshan Century Lotus Sports Center
22 May 2011	Melbourne	Australia	Melbourne Convention and Exhibition Center
19 November 2011	New Taipei	Taiwan	Banqiao First Stadium
3 December 2011	Kaohsiung	Taiwan	Kaohsiung Arena
16 June 2012	Chengdu	China	Chengdu Sports Center
20 October 2012	Singapore		Marina Bay Sands
21 October 2012	Singapore		Marina Bay Sands
20 December 2012	Macau		Macau Stadium

== Eason's Life World Tour ==
In 2015, Chan held his 100th show of Another Eason Life's World Tour in Montreal, Quebec, Canada, on 4 December 2015. This was the first time ever that a Hong Kong singer performed at the Centre Bell. The tour ended late in 2016, as he took a break from concert touring.

In September 2017, Chan began a new tour called Eason Says C'mon in~ Tour, which was noted for performing in small stadiums like Macpherson Stadium, Hong Kong, which could only seat about 2,500 people. This tour was to promote his new album “C’mon in~”, visiting 18 cities around the world, with 19 shows held across Asia, Europe, America, which was never been done before by any Hong Kong artist.

== Fear and Dreams World Tour ==
On 21 November 2019, it was announced that Fear and Dreams concerts would be cancelled because of unstable circumstances in Hong Kong. Fear and Dreams tour resumed in Hong Kong Coliseum from 9 December 2022 to January 2023, marking him performing as a solo act in the venue since Eason's Life tour in 2013. Fear and Dream world tour embarked in April 2023. The tour, so far, covered Taiwan, South East Asia, North America, Macau, and mainland China. He was the first Asian singer performing at Chase Center, San Francisco.

On 25 May 2024, after play the 100th show of the Fear and Dreams tour and the fourth of six shows in Hangzhou, Chan announced in person that the next two shows, scheduled for 25 and 26 May, will be postponed to 27 and 28 May because his doctors had advised him to rest his vocal chords. Chan had to postpone his shows again when he fainted from heatstroke while playing tennis outdoor on 10 June. The tour resumed in August 2024 after recovery. Chan would later cancel the Bangkok stop, originally to be held on 22 February 2025 at the Impact Arena, of the tour due to concerns of safety of his fans after a Chinese actor Wang Xing was abducted by a scam group in Bangkok.
