= Eason =

Eason is a surname of English and Scottish origin. In the case of English, it may be a variant of Eastham or Easton; in the case of Scottish, it is a variant of Esson. A variant of the surname is Easen.

== People with the surname ==
- Alec Eason (1889–1956), Australian rules footballer
- Andre Eason (born 1975), American boxer
- B. Reeves Eason (1886–1956), American film director, actor and screenwriter
- B. Reeves Eason Jr. (1914–1921), American child actor, son of the above
- Bill Eason (1882–1957), Australian rules footballer
- Bo Eason (born 1960), American National Football League safety
- Bryson Eason (born 2002), American football player
- Cordera Eason (born 1987), American football running back
- Doc Eason (born 1947), American magician
- Edward Holt Eason (1915–1999), British myriapodologist
- Eric Eason, American film director and screenwriter
- Herbert Lightfoot Eason (1874–1949), British ophthalmic surgeon and Vice Chancellor of the University of London
- Jacob Eason (born 1997), American college football quarterback
- Jamie Eason (born 1976), American fitness model and writer
- Jim Eason (1935–2026), American radio personality
- Mal Eason (1879–1970), American baseball pitcher and umpire
- Nick Eason (born 1980), American former National Football League defensive end and current assistant coach
- Roger Eason (1918–1988), American National Football League player
- Tari Eason (born 2001), American basketball player
- Tony Eason (born 1959), American National Football League quarterback
- Ursula Eason (1910–1993), British radio broadcaster, television producer and administrator

== People with the given name ==
- Eason Chan (born 1974), Hong Kong singer and actor
- Eason Jordan, American businessman and former CNN chief news executive
- Eason Ramson (born 1956), American National Football League tight end

== See also ==
- Eason & Son, Irish bookstore chain
