= List of awards and nominations received by Eason Chan =

Eason Chan is a Hong Kong singer, songwriter, and actor who has been honoured multiple times in Cantonese music and Mandopop.

== Beijing Pop Music Awards ==
Year	Nominee / work	Award	Result	Ref.
2008	Eason Chan	Best Male Artist (Chinese: 年度最佳男歌手)	Won	
2009	Eason Chan	Best Male Artist (Chinese: 年度最佳男歌手)	Won	

== CASH Golden Sail Music Awards ==
Year	Nominee / work	Award	Result	Ref.
2011	Eason Chan/Twisted World (Traditional/Chinese: 六月飛霜/六月飞霜）	Best Male Performance (Chinese: 最佳男歌手演绎)	Won	
2011	Eason Chan/Twisted World (Traditional/Chinese: 六月飛霜/六月飞霜）	CASH Best Song (Chinese: CASH最佳歌曲大奖)	Won	

== CCTV-MTV Music Awards ==
Year	Nominee / work	Award	Result	Ref.
2008	Eason Chan	Favorite Male:Hong Kong (Chinese:香港地区年度最受欢迎男歌手奖)	Won	

== China Music Awards ==
Year	Nominee / work	Award	Result	Ref.
2001	Eason Chan	Outstanding Performance Award (Chinese:卓越歌艺奖)	Won	
2001	Love is Doubting (Chinese:爱是怀疑)	Favorite Song (Chinese:最受欢迎歌曲)	Won	

== Chinese Music Awards ==
Year	Nominee / work	Award	Result	Ref.
2011	Time Flies	Top 10 Mandarin Albums (Chinese:十大华语唱片)	Won	
2011	Tourbillon (Traditional/Chinese:陀飛輪/陀飞轮)	Top 10 Mandarin Songs (Chinese:十大华语金曲)	Won	
2011	Eason Chan	Best Cantonese Male Singer (Chinese:最佳粤语男歌手奖)	Won	

== Golden Melody Awards ==
Year	Nominee / work	Award	Result	Ref.
2003	Eason Chan	Best Mandarin Male Singer (Chinese:最佳国语男演唱人奖)	Won	
2003	Special Thanks To (Chinese:最佳国语专辑)	Best Mandarin Album	Won	

== IFPI Hong Kong Top Sales Music Award ==
Year	Nominee / work	Award	Result	Ref.
2003	Black, White, Gray (Chinese:黑白灰)	IFPI Top 10 Selling Mandrin Album(IFPI十大最高销量国语唱片)	Won	
2011	Tourbillon (Traditional/Chinese:陀飛輪/陀飞轮)	Top 10 Degital Selling Songs (Chinese:十大数码畅销歌曲奖)	Won	

== Jade Solid Gold Best Ten Music Awards ==
Year	Nominee / work	Award	Result	Ref.
1998	Full of Whims in My Mind (Chinese:大激想)	Favorite Jingle:Bronze Prize (Chinese:最受歡迎廣告歌曲獎-銅獎)	Bronze	
1998	Matchless (Traditional/Chinese:天下無雙)	Top 10 Smash Hits (Chinese:十大勁歌金曲獎)	Won	
2000	King of Karaoke (Chinese:K歌之王)	Top 10 Smash Hits (Chinese:十大勁歌金曲獎)	Won	
2002	Today Next Year (Chinese:明年今日)	Top 10 Smash Hits (Chinese:十大勁歌金曲獎)	Won	
2002	Today Next Year (Chinese:明年今日)	Gold Prize Song (Chinese:金曲金獎)	Gold	
2003	Want you back (Chinese:十面埋伏)	Top 10 Smash Hits (Chinese:十大勁歌金曲獎)	Won	
2005	Sunset (Chinese:夕陽無限好）	Top 10 Smash Hits (Chinese:十大勁歌金曲獎)	Won	
2005	Liston (Chinese:聽聽)	Favorite Jingle:Bronze Prize (Chinese:最受歡迎廣告歌曲獎-金獎)	Won	
2006	Best Friend (Chinese:最佳損友)	Top 10 Smash Hits (Chinese:十大勁歌金曲獎)	Won	
2006	Eason Chan	Favorite Male Singer (Chinese:最受歡迎男歌星）	Won	
2007	Eason Chan	Favorite Male Singer (Chinese:最受歡迎男歌星）	Won	
2007	Eliminated (Chinese:淘汰)	Favorite Mandarin Song (Traditional/Chinese:最受歡迎華語歌曲獎銀獎/最受欢迎华语歌曲奖银奖)	Won	
2007	Sorrow Is Meaningless (Traditional/Chinese:富士山下）	Top 10 Smash Hits (Traditional/Chinese:十大勁歌金曲獎/十大劲歌金曲奖)	Won	
2008	Worship (Traditional/Chinese:歌頒/歌颂）	Top 10 Smash Hits (Traditional/Chinese:十大勁歌金曲獎/十大劲歌金曲奖)	Won	
2008	Eason Chan	Favorite Male Singer in Aaian Pacific Area (Traditional/Chinese:亞太區最受歡迎男歌星/亚太区最受欢迎男歌星）	Won	

== Metro Radio Hits Music Awards ==
Year	Nominee / work	Award	Result	Ref.
2001	Shall We Talk	Top SMASH Hits (Traditional/Chinese:勁爆歌曲/劲爆歌曲）	Won	
2001	Shall We Talk	SMASH Worldwide Song (Traditional/Chinese:勁爆全球歌曲/劲爆全球歌曲）	Won	
2001	Shall We Dance?Shall We Talk!	Four Stations Joint:Album Award (Traditional/Chinese:四台聯頒大碟獎/四台联颁大碟奖)	Won	
2003	Want You Back (Traditional/Chinese:十面埋伏)	Top SMASH Hits (Traditional/Chinese:勁爆歌曲/劲爆歌曲）	Won	
2003	Want You Back (Traditional/Chinese:十面埋伏)	Four Stations Joint:Song Award (Traditional/Chinese:四台聯頒音樂大獎 - 歌曲獎/四台联颁音乐大奖 - 歌曲奖)	Won	
2005	Grandiose (Traditional/Chinese:浮誇/浮夸)	Top SMASH Hits (Traditional/Chinese:勁爆歌曲/劲爆歌曲）	Won	
2005	Grandiose (Traditional/Chinese:浮誇/浮夸)	My Favorite Song (Traditional/Chinese:勁爆我最欣賞歌曲/劲爆我最欣賞歌曲)	Won	
2005	Sunset (Traditional/Chinese:夕陽無限好/夕阳无限好）	Top Smash Hits (Traditional/Chinese:勁爆歌曲/劲爆歌曲）	Won	
2005	Sunset (Traditional/Chinese:夕陽無限好/夕阳无限好）	SMASH Song of the Year (Traditional/Chinese:勁爆年度歌曲/劲爆年度歌曲）	Won	
2005	U87	SMASH Album (Traditional/Chinese:勁爆大碟/劲爆大碟）	Won	
2005	Eason Chan	SMASH Male (Traditional/Chinese:勁爆男歌手/劲爆男歌手)	Won	
2006	Be Your Man (Traditional/Chinese:裙下之臣）	Top Smash Hits (Traditional/Chinese:勁爆歌曲/劲爆歌曲）	Won	
2006	Best Friend (Traditional/Chinese:最佳損友/最佳损友)	Top Smash Hits (Traditional/Chinese:勁爆歌曲/劲爆歌曲）	Won	
2006	Eason Chan	SMASH Mandarin Male (Traditional/Chinese:勁爆國语男歌手/劲爆国语男歌手)	Won	
2006	Eason Chan	SMASH Male (Traditional/Chinese:勁爆男歌手/劲爆男歌手)	Won	
2006	Life Continues...	SMASH Album (Traditional/Chinese:勁爆大碟/劲爆大碟）	Won	
2006	Eason Chan	SMASH Worldwide Stage Performance Award (Traditional/Chinese:勁爆全球舞台大獎/劲爆全球舞台大奖）	Won	
2007	Eason Chan	SMASH Worldwide Stage Performance Award (Traditional/Chinese:勁爆全球舞台大獎/劲爆全球舞台大奖）	Won	
2007	Eason Chan	SMASH Worldwide Singer (Traditional/Chinese:勁爆全球歌手/劲爆全球歌手)	Won	
2007	Crying in the Party	Top SMASH Hits (Traditional/Chinese:勁爆歌曲/劲爆歌曲）	Won	
2007	富士山下 (Traditional/Chinese:富士山下)	My Favorite Song (Traditional/Chinese:勁爆我最欣賞歌曲/劲爆我最欣賞歌曲)	Won	
2007	Listen to Eason Chan	SMASH Album (Traditional/Chinese:勁爆年度大碟/劲爆年度大碟）	Won	
2008	Wheel of the Era (Traditional/Chinese:時代巨輪/时代巨轮)	Top SMASH Hits (Traditional/Chinese:勁爆歌曲/劲爆歌曲）	Won	
2008	Eason Chan	SMASH Worldwide Singer (Traditional/Chinese:勁爆全球歌手/劲爆全球歌手)	Won	
2008	Eason Chan	SMASH Male (Traditional/Chinese:勁爆男歌手/劲爆男歌手)	Won	
2008	Eason Chan	My Favorite Male (Traditional/Chinese:勁爆我最欣賞男歌手/劲爆我最欣賞男歌手)	Won	
2008	That's Just Life (Chinese:路一直都在)	SMASH Worldwide Song (Traditional/Chinese:勁爆全球歌曲/劲爆全球歌曲）	Won	
2009	7 Hundreds Later (Traditional/Chinese:七百年後/七百年后)	Metro Top SMASH Hits (Traditional/Chinese:新城勁爆歌曲/新城劲爆歌曲）	Won	
2009	7 Hundreds Later (Traditional/Chinese:七百年後/七百年后)	Metro SMASH Worldwide Song (Traditional/Chinese:新城全球勁爆歌曲/新城全球劲爆歌曲）	Won	
2009	H3M	Metro SMASH Album of the Year (Traditional/Chinese:新城勁爆年度專輯/新城劲爆年度专辑)	Won	
2009	Eason Chan	Metro SMASH King of Pop( (Traditional/Chinese:新城勁爆流行歌王榮譽大獎/新城劲爆流行歌王荣誉大奖）	Won	
2009	Eason Chan	Metro SMASH Male (Traditional/Chinese:新城勁爆男歌手/新城劲爆男歌手)	Won	
2009	Eason Chan	Metro SMASH Worldwide Singer (Traditional/Chinese:新城全球勁爆歌手/新城全球劲爆歌手)	Won	
2010	Naked (Traditional/Chinese:一絲不掛/一丝不挂)	Top SMASH Hits (Traditional/Chinese:勁爆歌曲/劲爆歌曲）	Won	
2010	Eason Chan, Rowena Cortes (Chinese:露云娜)/Talk About Men or Women( (Traditional/Chinese:講男講女/讲男讲女）	Metro SMASH Collaboration (Traditional/Chinese:新城勁爆合唱歌曲/新城劲爆合唱歌曲）	Won	
2010	Eason Chan	Metro SMASH Worldwide Singer (Traditional/Chinese:新城全球勁爆歌手/新城全球劲爆歌手)	Won	
2010	Eason Chan	Metro My Favorite Male (Traditional/Chinese:新城勁爆我最欣賞男歌手/新城劲爆我最欣賞男歌手)	Won	
2010	Eason Chan	Metro SMASH Worldwide Stage Performance Award (Traditional/Chinese:新城全球勁爆舞台大獎/新城全球劲爆舞台大奖）	Won	
2011	Eason Chan	Metro SMASH Worldwide Singer (Traditional/Chinese:新城全球勁爆歌手/新城全球劲爆歌手)	Won	
2011	Eason Chan	Metro SMASH Most Playing Award (Traditional/Chinese:新城勁爆播放指數大獎(歌手獎)/新城劲爆播放指数大奖（歌手奖））	Won	
2011	Bitter Melon (Traditional/Chinese:苦瓜)	SMASH Song of the Year (Traditional/Chinese:勁爆年度歌曲/劲爆年度歌曲）	Won	
2011	Twisted World (Traditional/Chinese:六月飛霜/六月飞霜）	Metro SMASH Worldwide Song (Traditional/Chinese:新城全球勁爆歌曲/新城全球劲爆歌曲）	Won	

== Metro Radio Mandarin Hits Music Awards ==
Year	Nominee / work	Award	Result	Ref.
2008	That's Just Life (Chinese:路一直都在)	Mandarin Force Song of the Year (Chinese:新城国语力年度歌曲大奖)	Won	
2008	That's Just Life (Chinese:路一直都在)	Mandarin Force Songs (Chinese:新城国语力歌曲)	Won	
2008	Eason Chan	Mandarin Force Male Singer (Chinese:新城国语力男歌手)	Won	
2008	Eason Chan	Mandarin Force Singer of the Year (Chinese:新城国语力年度歌手大奖)	Won	
2008	Eason Chan	Mandarin Force Performance Award (Chinese:新城国语力演绎奖)	Won	
2009	Eason Chan	Mandarin Force Favorite Singer;Hong Kong (Chinese:国语力全国最受欢迎歌手:香港)	Won	
2009	Eason Chan	Global Favorite Singer (Chinese:全球最受欢迎至尊歌手大奖）	Won	
2009	Eason Chan	Mandarin Force Global Stage Perforence Award (Chinese:新城国语力全球至尊舞台大奖)	Won	
2009	Now What (Chinese:然后怎样)	Mandarin Force Song of the Year (Chinese:新城国语力年度歌曲大奖)	Won	
2011	Eason Chan	Global Favorite Singer (Chinese:全球最受欢迎至尊歌手大奖）	Won	
2011	Eason Chan	Mandarin Force Singer of the Year (Chinese:新城国语力年度歌手大奖)	Won	
2011	Because Love (Chinese:因为爱情)	Mandarin Force Songs (Chinese:新城国语力歌曲)	Won	
2011	Waiting for You Loving Me (Chinese:等你爱我)	Mandarin Force Songs (Chinese:新城国语力歌曲)	Won	

== Music King Awards ==
Year	Nominee / work	Award	Result	Ref.
2009	Eason Chan	Favorite Male Singer(Hong Kong & Tai Wan) (Chinese:港台最受欢迎男歌手)	Won	

== MY Astro Music Awards ==
Year	Nominee / work	Award	Result	Ref.
2009	7 Hundreds Later (Traditional/Chinese:七百年後/七百年后)	Top Hits (Chinese:至尊金曲)	Won	
2009	Guilty (Traditional/Chinese:于心有愧)	Top Hits (Chinese:至尊金曲)	Won	
2009	Eason Chan	Oversea Best Male (Chinese:至尊海外男歌手奖)	Won	

== RTHK Top 10 Gold Songs Awards ==
Year	Nominee / work	Award	Result	Ref.
1997	Be With Me (Traditional/Chinese:與我常在/与我常在)	Best Original Song (Traditional/Chinese:最佳原創歌曲獎/最佳原创歌曲）	Won	
1998	Matchless (Traditional/Chinese:天下無雙/天下无双)	Top 10 Mandarin Hits (Traditional/Chinese:十大中文金曲)	Won	
1998	Eason Chan	Break-through Award (Traditional/Chinese:飛躍大獎/飞跃大奖)	Won	
2001	Shall We Talk	Top 10 Mandarin Hits (Traditional/Chinese:十大中文金曲)	Won	
2001	Shall We Talk	Favorite Karaoke Song:Male (Traditional/Chinese:最愛歡迎卡拉ok歌曲獎/最受欢迎卡拉OK歌曲奖）	Won	
2001	Shall We Talk	Top Song in Mandarin World (Traditional/Chinese:全球華人至尊金曲)	Won	
2001	Eason Chan	Four Stations Joint:Media Award (Traditional/Chinese:四台聯頒獎項:傳媒大獎/四台联颁:传媒大奖）	Won	
2002	Today Next Year (Traditional/Chinese:明年今日)	Top Song in Mandarin World (Traditional/Chinese:全球華人至尊金曲)	Won	
2002	Today Next Year (Traditional/Chinese:明年今日)	Top 10 Mandarin Hits (Traditional/Chinese:十大中文金曲)	Won	
2003	Want You Back (Traditional/Chinese:十面埋伏)	Top 10 Mandarin Hits (Traditional/Chinese:十大中文金曲)	Won	
2003	Want You Back (Traditional/Chinese:十面埋伏)	Top Song in Mandarin World (Traditional/Chinese:全球華人至尊金曲)	Won	
2005	Sunset (Traditional/Chinese:夕陽無限好/夕阳无限好）	Top Song in Mandarin World (Traditional/Chinese:全球華人至尊金曲)	Won	
2005	Sunset (Traditional/Chinese:夕陽無限好/夕阳无限好）	Top 10 Hits (Traditional/Chinese:十大金曲獎/十大金曲奖)	Won	
2005	Sunset (Traditional/Chinese:夕陽無限好/夕阳无限好）	Favorite Mandarin Song:Silver Prize (Traditional/Chinese:全國最受歡迎中文歌曲獎銀獎/全国最受欢迎中文歌曲奖银奖)	Silver	
2005	Eason Chan	Favorite Male Singer:Silver Prize (Traditional/Chinese:全國最受歡迎歌手獎(男歌手銀獎)/全国最受欢迎歌手奖（男歌手银奖）)	Silver	
2005	Eason Chan	Best Pop Male (Traditional/Chinese:最優秀流行男歌手大獎/最优秀流行男歌手大奖）	Won	
2005	Eason Chan	Excellent Pop Singer( (Traditional/Chinese:優秀流行歌手大獎/优秀流行歌手大奖)	Won	
2006	Eason Chan	Best Pop Male (Traditional/Chinese:最優秀流行男歌手大獎/最优秀流行男歌手大奖）	Won	
2006	Eason Chan	Excellent Pop Singer( (Traditional/Chinese:優秀流行歌手大獎/优秀流行歌手大奖)	Won	
2006	Best Friend (Traditional/Chinese:最佳損友)	Top 10 Hits (Traditional/Chinese:十大金曲獎/十大金曲奖)	Won	
2007	Eason Chan	Top Selling Male of the Year (Traditional/Chinese:全年最高銷量歌手男歌手大獎/全年最高销量男歌手大奖)	Won	
2007	Eason Chan	Best Pop Male (Traditional/Chinese:最優秀流行男歌手大獎/最优秀流行男歌手大奖）	Won	
2007	Eason Chan	Excellent Pop Singer( (Traditional/Chinese:優秀流行歌手大獎/优秀流行歌手大奖)	Won	
2007	Sorrow Is Meaningless (Traditional/Chinese:富士山下）	Top 10 Hits (Traditional/Chinese:十大金曲獎/十大金曲奖)	Won	
2007	Sorrow Is Meaningless (Traditional/Chinese:富士山下）	Top Song in Mandarin World (Traditional/Chinese:全球華人至尊金曲)	Won	
2008	Eason Chan	Excellent Pop Singer (Traditional/Chinese:優秀流行歌手大獎/优秀流行歌手大奖)	Won	
2008	Eason Chan	Top Selling Male of the Year (Traditional/Chinese:全年最高銷量歌手男歌手大獎/全年最高销量男歌手大奖)	Won	
2009	(Traditional/Chinese:七百年後/七百年后)	Top 10 Hits (Traditional/Chinese:十大金曲獎/十大金曲奖)	Won	
2009	(Traditional/Chinese:七百年後/七百年后)	Top 10 Hits (Traditional/Chinese:十大金曲獎/十大金曲奖)	Won	
2009	Eason Chan	Excellent Pop Singer( (Traditional/Chinese:優秀流行歌手大獎/优秀流行歌手大奖)	Won	
2009	Eason Chan	Best Pop Male (Traditional/Chinese:最優秀流行男歌手大獎/最优秀流行男歌手大奖）	Won	
2009	Eason Chan	Top Selling Male of the Year (Traditional/Chinese:全年最高銷量歌手男歌手大獎/全年最高销量男歌手大奖)	Won	
2009	Eason Chan	Best Male (Traditional/Chinese:全國最佳歌手男歌手獎/全国最佳歌手男歌手奖）	Won	
2010	Tourbillon (Traditional/Chinese:陀飛輪/陀飞轮)	Top 10 Hits (Traditional/Chinese:十大金曲獎/十大金曲奖)	Won	
2010	Eason Chan	Excellent Pop Singer( (Traditional/Chinese:優秀流行歌手大獎/优秀流行歌手大奖)	Won	
2010	Eason Chan	Best Pop Male (Traditional/Chinese:最優秀流行男歌手大獎/最优秀流行男歌手大奖）	Won	
2010	Eason Chan	Top Selling Male of the Year (Traditional/Chinese:全年最高銷量歌手男歌手大獎/全年最高销量男歌手大奖)	Won	
2010	Tourbillon (Traditional/Chinese:陀飛輪/陀飞轮)	Top Song in Mandarin World (Traditional/Chinese:全球華人至尊金曲)	Won	
2010	Eason Chan	Media Recommendation Award:Male (Traditional/Chinese:傳媒推薦大獎男歌手/传媒推荐大奖男歌手）	Won	
2010	Tourbillon (Traditional/Chinese:陀飛輪/陀飞轮)	Media Recommendation Award:Song (Traditional/Chinese:傳媒推薦大獎歌曲/传媒推荐大奖歌曲)	Won	
2011	Twisted World (Traditional/Chinese:六月飛霜/六月飞霜)	Top 10 Hits (Traditional/Chinese:十大金曲獎/十大金曲奖)	Won	
2011	Eason Chan	Excellent Pop Singer( (Traditional/Chinese:優秀流行歌手大獎/优秀流行歌手大奖)	Won	
2011	Eason Chan	Best Pop Male (Traditional/Chinese:最優秀流行男歌手大獎/最优秀流行男歌手大奖）	Won	
2011	Eason Chan	Top Selling Male of the Year (Traditional/Chinese:全年最高銷量歌手男歌手大獎/全年最高销量男歌手大奖)	Won	
2011	Eason Chan	Best Male (Traditional/Chinese:全國最佳歌手男歌手獎/全国最佳歌手男歌手奖）	Won	

== SINA Music Polls Awards ==
Year	Nominee / work	Award	Result	Ref.
2006	Sorrow Is Meaningless (Traditional/Chinese:富士山下）	Highest New Song Premiere Rating (Chinese:新歌试听最高收听率歌曲奖)	Won	
2009	H3M	My Favorite Album (Chinese:我最喜爱至尊大碟)	Won	
2011	Stranger Under My Skin	My Favorite Album (Chinese:我最喜爱至尊大碟)	Won	
2011	Eason Chan	Sino Weibo Male Artist (Chinese:新浪微博发声男歌手奖)	Won	

== Star Awards ==
Year	Nominee / work	Award	Result	Ref.
2008	Eason Chan	Male Artist of the Year(Hong Kong&Tan Wan) (Chinese:港台地区年度男歌手)	Won	
2008	Don't want to let go (Chinese:不想放手)	Album of the Year(Hong Kong&Tan Wan) (Chinese:港台地区年度专辑)	Won	
2009	Eason Chan	Male Artist of the Year(Hong Kong&Tan Wan) (Chinese:港台地区年度男歌手)	Won	

== Top Chinese Music Awards ==
Year	Nominee / work	Award	Result	Ref.
2009	Eason Chan/Don't want to let go (Chinese:不想放手)	Best Male Artist(Hong Kong&Tan Wan) (Chinese:港台地区最佳男歌手)	Won	
2009	Don't want to let go (Chinese:不想放手)	Best Album(Hong Kong&Tan Wan) (Chinese:港台地区最佳专辑)	Won	
2009	That's Just Life (Chinese:路一直都在)	Best Music Video (Chinese:最佳音乐录影带)	Won	
2009	That's Just Life (Chinese:路一直都在)	Best Song of the Year(Hong Kong&Tan Wan) (Chinese:港台地区最佳歌曲)	Won	
2009	Eason Chan	Jury Prize:Artist of the Year (Chinese:评审团大奖:年度风云大奖)	Won	

== TVB8 Mandarin Music On Demand Awards ==
Year	Nominee / work	Award	Result	Ref.
2008	Eason Chan	Favorite Male (Chinese:最受欢迎男歌手)	Won	
2008	Wheel of the Era (Traditional/Chinese:時代巨輪)	Worldwide Favorite Cantonese Song (Chinese:全球热爱粤语歌曲)	Won	

== Ultimate Song Chart Awards ==
Year	Nominee / work	Award	Result	Ref.
1998	Matchless (Traditional/Chinese:天下無雙/天下无双)	Professional Recommendation:Top 10 Songs (Traditional/Chinese:專業推介叱吒十大/专业推介叱咤十大)	Won	
1998	My Happy Time (Traditional/Chinese:我的快樂時代/我的快乐时代)	Top Album (Traditional/Chinese:叱吒樂壇至尊唱片大獎/叱咤乐坛至尊唱片大奖）	Won	
1998	Eason Chan	903 ID Club's Choice - Hung Hom Concert Debut (Traditional/Chinese:903 id club投選 - 首次紅館個唱/903 id club投选 - 首次红馆个唱）	Won	
1999	Ferris Wheel (Traditional/Chinese:幸福摩天輪)	Professional Recommendation:Top 10 Songs (Traditional/Chinese:專業推介叱吒十大/专业推介叱咤十大)	Won	
1999	Ferris Wheel (Traditional/Chinese:幸福摩天輪)	My Favorite Song (Traditional/Chinese:叱吒樂壇我最喜愛的歌曲大獎/叱吒乐坛我最喜愛的歌曲大奖）	Won	
1999	God Bless My love (Traditional/Chinese:天祐愛人)	Top Album (Traditional/Chinese:叱吒樂壇至尊唱片大獎/叱咤乐坛至尊唱片大奖）	Won	
2000	King of Karaoke (Traditional/Chinese:K歌之王)	Professional Recommendation:Top 10 Songs (Traditional/Chinese:專業推介叱吒十大/专业推介叱咤十大)	Won	
2000	King of Karaoke (Traditional/Chinese:K歌之王)	My Favorite Song (Traditional/Chinese:叱吒樂壇我最喜愛的歌曲大獎/叱吒乐坛我最喜愛的歌曲大奖）	Won	
2000	King of Karaoke (Traditional/Chinese:K歌之王)	Top Song (Traditional/Chinese:叱吒樂壇至尊歌曲大獎/叱吒乐坛至尊歌曲大奖）	Won	
2000	Eason Chan	Top Male:Silver Prize (Traditional/Chinese:叱吒樂壇男歌手銀獎/叱吒乐坛男歌手银奖）	Silver	
2001	Shall We Talk	Professional Recommendation:Top 10 Songs (Traditional/Chinese:專業推介叱吒十大/专业推介叱咤十大)	Won	
2001	Shall We Dance?Shall We Talk!	Top Album (Traditional/Chinese:叱吒樂壇至尊唱片大獎/叱咤乐坛至尊唱片大奖）	Won	
2001	Eason Chan	Top Male:Gold Prize (Traditional/Chinese:叱吒樂壇男歌手金獎/叱吒乐坛男歌手金奖）	Gold	
2001	Eason Chan	15-24 Years old Top Hero Award (Traditional/Chinese:叱吒樂壇15-24歲最喜愛的人人英雄/叱吒乐坛15-24岁最喜愛的人人英雄)	Won	
2002	Crowded (Traditional/Chinese:人来人往）	Professional Recommendation:Top 10 Songs (Traditional/Chinese:專業推介叱吒十大/专业推介叱咤十大)	Won	
2002	The Line-up	Top Album (Traditional/Chinese:叱吒樂壇至尊唱片大獎/叱咤乐坛至尊唱片大奖）	Won	
2002	Eason Chan	Top Male:Gold Prize (Traditional/Chinese:叱吒樂壇男歌手金獎/叱吒乐坛男歌手金奖）	Gold	
2003	Want you back (Traditional/Chinese:十面埋伏)	Professional Recommendation:Top 10 Songs (Traditional/Chinese:專業推介叱吒十大/专业推介叱咤十大)	Won	
2003	Eason Chan	Top Male:Bronze Prize (Traditional/Chinese:叱吒樂壇男歌手銅獎/叱吒乐坛男歌手铜奖）	Bronze	
2005	Sunset (Traditional/Chinese:夕陽無限好/夕阳无限好）	Professional Recommendation:Top 10 Songs (Traditional/Chinese:專業推介叱吒十大/专业推介叱咤十大)	Won	
2005	Sunset (Traditional/Chinese:夕陽無限好/夕阳无限好）	Top Song (Traditional/Chinese:叱吒樂壇至尊歌曲大獎/叱吒乐坛至尊歌曲大奖）	Won	
2005	Sunset (Traditional/Chinese:夕陽無限好/夕阳无限好）	My Favorite Song (Traditional/Chinese:叱吒樂壇我最喜愛的歌曲大獎/叱吒乐坛我最喜愛的歌曲大奖）	Won	
2005	Eason Chan	Top Male:Gold Prize (Traditional/Chinese:叱吒樂壇男歌手金獎/叱吒乐坛男歌手金奖）	Gold	
2005	Eason Chan	My Favorite Male Singer (Traditional/Chinese:叱吒樂壇我最喜愛的男歌手/叱吒乐坛我最喜愛的男歌手	Won	
2005	U87	Top Album (Traditional/Chinese:叱吒樂壇至尊唱片大獎/叱咤乐坛至尊唱片大奖）	Won	
2005	U87	Four Stations Joint:Album Award (Traditional/Chinese:四台聯頒大碟獎/四台联颁大碟奖)	Won	
2006	Sorrow Is Meaningless (Traditional/Chinese:富士山下）	Professional Recommendation:Top 10 Songs (Traditional/Chinese:專業推介叱吒十大/专业推介叱咤十大)	Won	
2006	Eason Chan	Top Male:Gold Prize (Traditional/Chinese:叱吒樂壇男歌手金獎/叱吒乐坛男歌手金奖）	Gold	
2006	Eason Chan	My Favorite Male Singer (Traditional/Chinese:叱吒樂壇我最喜愛的男歌手/叱吒乐坛我最喜愛的男歌手)	Won	
2007	Crying In The Party	Professional Recommendation:Top 10 Songs (Traditional/Chinese:專業推介叱吒十大/专业推介叱咤十大)	Won	
2007	Eason Chan	Top Male:Gold Prize (Traditional/Chinese:叱吒樂壇男歌手金獎/叱吒乐坛男歌手金奖）	Gold	
2007	Eason Chan	My Favorite Male Singer (Traditional/Chinese:叱吒樂壇我最喜愛的男歌手/叱吒乐坛我最喜愛的男歌手	Won	
2007	Listen to Eason Chan	Top Album (Traditional/Chinese:叱吒樂壇至尊唱片大獎/叱咤乐坛至尊唱片大奖）	Won	
2008	That's Just Life (Traditional/Chinese:路一直都在)	Professional Recommendation:Top 10 Songs (Traditional/Chinese:專業推介叱吒十大/专业推介叱咤十大)	Won	
2008	Eason Chan	My Favorite Male Singer (Traditional/Chinese:叱吒樂壇我最喜愛的男歌手/叱吒乐坛我最喜愛的男歌手)	Won	
2008	Eason Chan	Top Male:Bronze Prize (Traditional/Chinese:叱吒樂壇男歌手銅獎/叱吒乐坛男歌手銅奖）	Bronze	
2009	7 Hundreds Later (Traditional/Chinese:七百年後/七百年后)	Professional Recommendation:Top 10 Songs (Traditional/Chinese:專業推介叱吒十大/专业推介叱咤十大)	Won	
2009	7 Hundreds Later (Traditional/Chinese:七百年後/七百年后)	My Favorite Song (Traditional/Chinese:叱吒樂壇我最喜愛的歌曲大獎/叱吒乐坛我最喜愛的歌曲大奖）	Won	
2009	Eason Chan	Top Male:Gold Prize (Traditional/Chinese:叱吒樂壇男歌手金獎/叱吒乐坛男歌手金奖）	Gold	
2009	H3M	Top Album (Traditional/Chinese:叱吒樂壇至尊唱片大獎/叱咤乐坛至尊唱片大奖）	Won	
2009	H3M	Four Stations Joint:Album Award (Traditional/Chinese:四台聯頒大碟獎/四台联颁大碟奖)	Won	
2010	Tourbillon (Traditional/Chinese:陀飛輪/陀飞轮)	Professional Recommendation:Top 10 Songs (Traditional/Chinese:專業推介叱吒十大/专业推介叱咤十大)	Won	
2010	Tourbillon (Traditional/Chinese:陀飛輪/陀飞轮)	My Favorite Song (Traditional/Chinese:叱吒樂壇我最喜愛的歌曲大獎/叱吒乐坛我最喜愛的歌曲大奖）	Won	
2010	Eason Chan	Top Male:Gold Prize (Traditional/Chinese:叱吒樂壇男歌手金獎/叱吒乐坛男歌手金奖）	Gold	
2010	Eason Chan	My Favorite Male Singer (Traditional/Chinese:叱吒樂壇我最喜愛的男歌手/叱吒乐坛我最喜愛的男歌手)	Won	
2010	Time Flies	Top Album (Traditional/Chinese:叱吒樂壇至尊唱片大獎/叱咤乐坛至尊唱片大奖）	Won	
2011	Twisted World (Traditional/Chinese:六月飛霜/六月飞霜)	Professional Recommendation:Top 10 Songs (Traditional/Chinese:專業推介叱吒十大/专业推介叱咤十大)	Won	
2011	Eason Chan	Top Male:Gold Prize (Traditional/Chinese:叱吒樂壇男歌手金獎/叱吒乐坛男歌手金奖）	Gold	
2011	Eason Chan	My Favorite Male Singer (Traditional/Chinese:叱吒樂壇我最喜愛的男歌手/叱吒乐坛我最喜愛的男歌手)	Won	
