= Anne Griffin =

Irish novelist and short story writer

- Born: 9 January 1969 (age 57); Dublin, Ireland
- Education: Maynooth University; University College Dublin
- Occupations: Novelist; Short story writer
- Spouse: James Lowry
- Children: 1
- Writing career
- Language: English
- Notable works: When All Is Said; Listening Still; The Island of Longing
- Notable awards: Irish Book Awards Newcomer of the Year (2019)
- Website: annegriffinwriter.com

Anne Griffin (born 9 January 1969) is an Irish novelist and short story writer from Dublin. She is the author of the novels When All Is Said (2019), Listening Still (2021), and The Island of Longing (2023). When All Is Said won the 2019 Irish Book Awards Newcomer of the Year award. Griffin's work has also been shortlisted for the John McGahern Annual Book Prize, the Kate O'Brien Award and the Christopher Bland Prize, and longlisted for the Dublin Literary Award.

== Life ==
Originally from a working class family in Blackrock in Dublin, Griffin worked for bookseller Waterstones. She later attended Maynooth University, qualifying in the area of community work, and subsequently worked as a community development officer and in the voluntary sector. Later again, having started writing at the age of 44, she attended University College Dublin's M.A. in Creative Writing.

== Writing ==
Griffin came to prominence as a short story writer, before moving on to novel writing. Her debut novel When All is Said was released in 2019. RTÉ's Eileen Dunne describes it as a "little peach of a book", Listening Still was published in 2021. Her third novel, The Island of Longin was chosen as Eason's book of the month in May 2023.

== Awards ==
As a short story writer, Griffin was awarded the John McGahern Award for Literature. She has been shortlisted for the Hennessy New Irish Writing Award and the Sunday Business Post Short Story Award. "When All is Said" won the Irish Book Award for Best Newcomer in 2019.

== Personal life ==
Griffin lives in Mullingar, County Westmeath, with her husband, James Lowry, and their son, Adam.

== Works ==
- Griffin, Anne (2019). When All is Said.
- Griffin, Anne (2021). Listening Still.
- Griffin, Anne (2023). The Island of Longing.
