= Eason's Life World Tour =

Concert tour by Eason Chan

- World tour by Eason Chan
- Location: Asia; North America; Europe; Oceania
- Start date: 6 July 2013
- End date: 22 October 2016
- No. of shows: 135

Eason Chan concert chronology
- Feel Free! Feel Music! Concert (2012); Eason's Life World Tour (2013–2016); Fear and Dreams World Tour (2022–2025)

The Eason's Life World Tour (Chinese: Eason's Life世界巡回演唱会) is a concert tour by Hong Kong singer Eason Chan. It began at the Hong Kong Coliseum in July 2013 and ended at the Beijing National Stadium in October 2016. The tour spanned 135 concerts across Asia, North America, Europe, and Oceania.

== Background ==
In April 2015, the second phase of the tour called Another Eason's Life commenced in Changsha. It featured an updated set list and enhanced production. The tour continued throughout China, Taipei, Sydney, New Zealand, Las Vegas, Canada, and more.

Chan held his 100th show of Another Eason Life's World Tour in Montreal, Quebec, Canada, on 4 December 2015. This was the first time ever that a Hong Kong singer performed at the Bell Centre. The tour ended late in 2016, as he took a break from concert touring.

== Production ==
In an interview, Chan disclosed that Zhu Zuer was responsible for the stage and song list design for the Eason's Life World Tour. The theme of the tour is a combination of the words "Life," "Illusion," "Feeling," and "Enjoy", which represents the four segments of the concert.

== Critical reception ==
The tour received positive reviews from music critics. Today Online gave the Singapore concert a 4.5 out of 5 stars, commending Chan as "both an impressive vocalist and an electrifying performer." They added, "Chan devoted himself entirely to each and every song, delivering each tune to perfection".

== Tour dates ==
List of Eason's Life World Tour dates
Date	City	Country	Venue	Attendance
6 July 2013	Hong Kong		Hong Kong Coliseum	250,000
7 July 2013	Hong Kong		Hong Kong Coliseum	250,000
8 July 2013	Hong Kong		Hong Kong Coliseum	250,000
9 July 2013	Hong Kong		Hong Kong Coliseum	250,000
10 July 2013	Hong Kong		Hong Kong Coliseum	250,000
11 July 2013	Hong Kong		Hong Kong Coliseum	250,000
12 July 2013	Hong Kong		Hong Kong Coliseum	250,000
13 July 2013	Hong Kong		Hong Kong Coliseum	250,000
14 July 2013	Hong Kong		Hong Kong Coliseum	250,000
16 July 2013	Hong Kong		Hong Kong Coliseum	250,000
17 July 2013	Hong Kong		Hong Kong Coliseum	250,000
18 July 2013	Hong Kong		Hong Kong Coliseum	250,000
19 July 2013	Hong Kong		Hong Kong Coliseum	250,000
20 July 2013	Hong Kong		Hong Kong Coliseum	250,000
21 July 2013	Hong Kong		Hong Kong Coliseum	250,000
23 July 2013	Hong Kong		Hong Kong Coliseum	250,000
24 July 2013	Hong Kong		Hong Kong Coliseum	250,000
25 July 2013	Hong Kong		Hong Kong Coliseum	250,000
26 July 2013	Hong Kong		Hong Kong Coliseum	250,000
27 July 2013	Hong Kong		Hong Kong Coliseum	250,000
28 July 2013	Hong Kong		Hong Kong Coliseum	250,000
30 July 2013	Hong Kong		Hong Kong Coliseum	250,000
31 July 2013	Hong Kong		Hong Kong Coliseum	250,000
1 August 2013	Hong Kong		Hong Kong Coliseum	250,000
2 August 2013	Hong Kong		Hong Kong Coliseum	250,000
27 September 2013	Melbourne	Australia	Melbourne Convention and Exhibition Center	—
29 September 2013	Sydney	Australia	Sydney Entertainment Centre	—
19 October 2013	Kuala Lumpur	Malaysia	Stadium Merdeka	—
8 November 2013	Bangkok	Thailand	Central World Shopping Center	—
9 November 2013	Bangkok	Thailand	Central World Shopping Center	—
23 November 2013	Toronto	Canada	Coca-Cola Coliseum	—
30 November 2013	San Jose	United States	San Jose State Event Center	—
1 December 2013	San Jose	United States	San Jose State Event Center	—
3 December 2013	Vancouver	Canada	Rogers Arena	—
20 December 2013	Taipei	Taiwan	Taipei Arena	—
21 December 2013	Taipei	Taiwan	Taipei Arena	—
28 December 2013	Kaohsiung	Taiwan	Kaohsiung Arena	—
1 March 2014	Singapore		Singapore Indoor Stadium	8,000
14 March 2014	Macau		Cotai Arena	—
15 March 2014	Macau		Cotai Arena	—
28 March 2014	London	England	The O2 Arena	—
31 March 2014	Paris	France	Center of Paris	—
12 April 2014	Chengdu	China	Chengdu Sports Center	—
13 April 2014	Chengdu	China	Chengdu Sports Center	—
19 April 2014	George Town	Malaysia	SPICE Arena	—
26 April 2014	Chongqing	China	Chongqing Olympic Sports Center	—
10 May 2014	Zigong	China	South Lake Sports Center	—
17 May 2014	Dazhou	China	Dazhou Sports Center	—
24 May 2014	Guiyang	China	Guiyang Olympic Sports Center	—
31 May 2014	Kunming	China	Tuodong Stadium	—
14 June 2014	Guangzhou	China	Tianhe Stadium	—
21 June 2014	Xiamen	China	Xiamen Sports Center	—
28 June 2014	Wuhan	China	Wuhan Sports Center Stadium	—
5 July 2014	Nanchang	China	Jiangxi Olympic Sports Center	—
2 August 2014	Nanning	China	Guangxi Sports Center Stadium	—
9 August 2014	Jiangyin	China	Jiangyin Sports Center	—
16 August 2014	Beijing	China	Workers' Stadium	—
23 August 2014	Harbin	China	HICEC Stadium	—
30 August 2014	Shenyang	China	Shenyang Olympic Sports Centre Stadium	—
6 September 2014	Dalian	China	Dalian Sports Center Stadium	—
13 September 2014	Tianjin	China	Tianjin Olympic Sports Center Stadium	—
20 September 2014	Qingdao	China	Qingdao Guoxin Sports Center Stadium	—
27 September 2014	Zhengzhou	China	Henan Sports Center	—
11 October 2014	Shanghai	China	Hongkou Football Stadium	—
12 October 2014	Shanghai	China	Hongkou Football Stadium	—
18 October 2014	Suzhou	China	Suzhou Sports Center Stadium	—
25 October 2014	Nantong	China	Nantong Sports Exhibition Center Stadium	—
1 November 2014	Hefei	China	Hefei Olympic Sports Center Stadium	—
8 November 2014	Wenzhou	China	Wenzhou Sports Center	—
15 November 2014	Hangzhou	China	Huanglong Sports Center	—
22 November 2014	Changzhou	China	Changzhou Olympic Sports Center	—
29 November 2014	Ningbo	China	Ningbo Fubon Stadium	—
6 December 2014	Fuzhou	China	Fujian Sports Center Stadium	—
13 December 2014	Foshan	China	Century Lotus Stadium	—
20 December 2014	Shenzhen	China	Shenzhen Bay Sports Center Stadium	—
27 December 2014	Liuzhou	China	Liuzhou Sports Center	—

List of Another Eason's Life World Tour dates
Date	City	Country	Venue	Attendance
4 April 2015	Changsha	China	Helong Sports Center Stadium	—
11 April 2015	Nanjing	China	Nanjing Olympic Sports Center	—
18 April 2015	Luoyang	China	Luoyang New District Stadium	—
2 May 2015	Lishui	China	Lishui Stadium	—
9 May 2015	Quanzhou	China	Quanzhou Strait Sports Center Stadium	—
6 June 2015	Zunyi	China	Huichuan Stadium	—
13 June 2015	Taiyuan	China	Shanxi Sports Centre Stadium	—
20 June 2015	Xuzhou	China	Xuzhou Olympic Stadium	—
4 July 2015	Hohhot	China	Hohhot Stadium	—
15 August 2015	Huizhou	China	Huizhou Olympic Stadium	—
22 August 2015	Zhanjiang	China	Zhanjiang Sports Center Stadium	—
29 August 2015	Huzhou	China	Deqing Sports Center Stadium	—
5 September 2015	Xi'an	China	Shaanxi Provincial Stadium	—
12 September 2015	Jinan	China	Jinan Olympic Sports Center Stadium	—
19 September 2015	Changchun	China	Nanling Stadium	—
9 October 2015	Sydney	Australia	Qantas Credit Union Arena	—
11 October 2015	Melbourne	Australia	Melbourne Convention Centre	—
14 October 2015	Auckland	New Zealand	Vector Arena	—
23 October 2015	Chongqing	China	Chongqing Olympic Sports Center	—
31 October 2015	Shijiazhuang	China	Yu Tung International Stadium	—
7 November 2015	Jiaxing	China	Jiaxing Stadium	—
14 November 2015	Zhongshan	China	Zhongshan Xingzhong Stadium	—
28 November 2015	Las Vegas	United States	The AXIS at Planet Hollywood	—
4 December 2015	Montreal	Canada	Bell Centre	6,000
6 December 2015	New York City	United States	The Theater at Madison Square Garden	—
11 December 2015	San Jose	United States	San Jose State Event Center	—
13 December 2015	Vancouver	Canada	Rogers Arena	—
16 December 2015	Calgary	Canada	Stampede Corral	—
18 December 2015	Toronto	Canada	Air Canada Centre	—
30 December 2015	Macau		Cotai Arena	—
31 December 2015	Macau		Cotai Arena	—
26 February 2016	Genting Higlands	Malaysia	Arena of Stars	—
27 February 2016	Genting Higlands	Malaysia	Arena of Stars	—
28 February 2016	Genting Higlands	Malaysia	Arena of Stars	—
1 April 2016	Taipei	Taiwan	Taipei Arena	40,000
2 April 2016	Taipei	Taiwan	Taipei Arena	40,000
3 April 2016	Taipei	Taiwan	Taipei Arena	40,000
4 April 2016	Taipei	Taiwan	Taipei Arena	40,000
23 April 2016	Foshan	China	Foshan Century Lotus Sports Center	—
30 April 2016	Xiamen	China	Xiamen Sports Center	—
7 May 2016	Shanghai	China	Shanghai Stadium	—
14 May 2016	Hangzhou	China	Huanglong Sports Center Stadium	—
21 May 2016	Zhengzhou	China	Henan Sports Center	—
28 May 2016	Tianjin	China	Tianjin Olympic Center Stadium	—
11 June 2016	Qingdao	China	Guoxin Sports Center Stadium	—
18 June 2016	Nanning	China	Guangxi Sports Center Stadium	—
24 June 2016	Chengdu	China	Chengdu Sports Center	—
2 July 2016	Guiyang	China	Guiyang Olympic Sports Center	—
9 July 2016	Nanchang	China	Nanchang International Sports Center Stadium	—
16 July 2016	Shenzhen	China	Shenzhen Bay Sports Center Stadium	—
17 July 2016	Shenzhen	China	Shenzhen Bay Sports Center Stadium	—
10 September 2016	Fuzhou	China	Fuzhou Straits Olympic Sports Center	—
17 September 2016	Suzhou	China	Suzhou Sports Center Stadium	—
24 September 2016	Hefei	China	Hefei Olympic Sports Center	—
30 September 2016	Guangzhou	China	Higher Education Mega Center Central Stadium	—
8 October 2016	Dalian	China	Dalian Sports Center Stadium	—
15 October 2016	Shenyang	China	Shenyang Olympic Sports Center	—
21 October 2016	Beijing	China	Beijing National Stadium	120,000
22 October 2016	Beijing	China	Beijing National Stadium	120,000
Total				N/A
