= Herpystis isolata =

Scientific classification
- Kingdom: Animalia
- Phylum: Arthropoda
- Class: Insecta
- Order: Lepidoptera
- Family: Tortricidae
- Genus: Herpystis
- Species: H. isolata

Binomial name
- Herpystis isolata Razowski, 2013

Species of moth

Herpystis isolata is a species of moth of the family Tortricidae. It is found in Nigeria.

The wingspan is about 11 mm.

== Etymology ==
The species name refers to the systematic position in the genus and is derived from Latin isolata (meaning isolated).
