= Esson =

Esson may refer to:

== People ==
- George Esson (born 1942), Scottish police officer
- Henry Esson Young (1862–1939), Canadian physician and politician
- John Esson (1800–1860), Canadian merchant and politician
- Katja Esson, German-American filmmaker
- Louis Esson (1878–1943), Australian poet, journalist, critic and playwright
- Rachel Esson (born 1965), New Zealand librarian
- Ryan Esson (born 1980), Scottish football goalkeeper
- Victoria Esson (born 1991), New Zealand football goalkeeper
- William Esson (1838–1916), British mathematician

== Places ==
- Esson, Calvados, commune in the Calvados department in the Normandy region in northwestern France

== Other uses ==
- Herpystis esson, species of moth of the family Tortricidae

== See also ==
- Essonne, homophonous toponym
