= Herpystis jejuna =

Scientific classification
- Kingdom: Animalia
- Phylum: Arthropoda
- Class: Insecta
- Order: Lepidoptera
- Family: Tortricidae
- Genus: Herpystis
- Species: H. jejuna

Binomial name
- Herpystis jejuna Meyrick, 1916

Species of moth

Herpystis jejuna is a moth of the family Tortricidae first described by Edward Meyrick in 1916. It is found in India, Sri Lanka, and Fiji.

Larval host plants are Cuscuta and Eugenia species.
