= Constance Chan =

Hong Kong singer-songwriter

Constance Chan (Chinese: 陳康堤, born 4 October 2004) is a Hong Kong singer-songwriter. She is the daughter of singer Eason Chan and former actress Hilary Tsui.

== Biography ==
=== Early life ===
Chan was born in 2004 at Queen Mary Hospital in Hong Kong. Her English name was chosen by her mother, actress-turned-fashion buyer Hilary Tsui, while her Chinese name, Hong-tai (康堤), was chosen by lyricist Wyman Wong. The following year, her father, Eason Chan, released the song "Grown Up Girl" (大個女) on his album U87 as a gift to her. She attended Diocesan Girls' Junior School and later Diocesan Girls' School, where she was a member of the choir and the handball team.

From a young age, Chan was featured in her father's musical work. A photograph of her, taken by her father, was used as the cover of his 2006 EP, Life Continues.... The release also included the song "Growing Up Too Fast" (大得太快), which features samples of Chan's voice and laughter. In 2011, she played piano on and appeared in the music video for the track "Baby Song" on his album ?. In 2023, she provided backing vocals for his song "Blind Marriage, Mute Spouse" (盲婚啞嫁).

=== Career ===
In May 2025, Chan signed with Warner Music Hong Kong. She released her debut single, the English-language track "doll," in June, followed by her debut Cantonese single, "stop calling!!" (一律建議分手), in September. Chan co-wrote both songs. The lyrics for the Cantonese single were written by Wyman Wong, who had previously written the lyrics for Eason Chan's first major Cantonese single, "Anthem of the Times" (時代曲). On August 2, 2025, Chan made her debut public performance at the Warner Music festival WM!GO! in Macau, where she performed "doll" and a cover of Khalil Fong's "Love Song."
