= Herpystis =

Scientific classification
- Domain: Eukaryota
- Kingdom: Animalia
- Phylum: Arthropoda
- Class: Insecta
- Order: Lepidoptera
- Family: Tortricidae
- Tribe: Eucosmini
- Genus: Herpystis; Meyrick, 1911

Genus of tortrix moths

Herpystis is a genus of moths belonging to the subfamily Olethreutinae of the family Tortricidae.

== Species ==
- Herpystis assimulatana Kuznetzov, 1997
- Herpystis avida Meyrick, 1911
- Herpystis cuscutae Bradley, 1968
- Herpystis esson Razowski, 2013
- Herpystis iodryas Meyrick in Caradja & Meyrick, 1937
- Herpystis isolata Razowski, 2013
- Herpystis jejuna Meyrick, 1916
- Herpystis maurodicha Clarke, 1976
- Herpystis mica Kuznetzov, 1988
- Herpystis mimica Clarke, 1976
- Herpystis pallidula Meyrick, 1912
- Herpystis rusticula Meyrick, 1911
- Herpystis theodora Clarke, 1976
- Herpystis tinctoria Meyrick, 1916

== See also ==
- List of Tortricidae genera
