= Eastham =

Eastham or East Ham, may refer to:

== People ==
- Ashley Eastham (born 1991), English footballer
- George R. Eastham (1913–2000), English footballer
- George E. Eastham (1936–2024), English footballer and son of the George R. Eastham
- Harry Eastham (1917–1998), English footballer and brother of George R. Eastham
- Michael Eastham (1920–1993), British barrister and judge

== Places ==
- Eastham, Massachusetts, town in Massachusetts, USA
  - North Eastham, Massachusetts, village in Eastham, Massachusetts
- Eastham, Merseyside, village on the Wirral Peninsula, England
- Eastham, Worcestershire, village in Worcestershire, England
- Eastham Unit, a prison in Lovelady, Texas
- East Ham, a district of London, England
- East Ham (UK Parliament constituency)

== See also ==
- East (disambiguation)
- Ham (disambiguation)
