= Fear and Dreams World Tour =

2022–25 concert tour by Eason Chan

- World tour by Eason Chan
- Location: Asia; North America; Europe; Oceania
- Start date: December 9, 2022
- End date: August 10, 2025
- No. of shows: 182

Eason Chan concert chronology
- Eason's Life World Tour (2013–2016); Fear and Dreams (2022–2025)

The Fear and Dreams World Tour (Chinese: 陳奕迅Fear and Dreams世界巡迴演唱會) was a concert tour by Hong Kong singer Eason Chan. It began at the Hong Kong Coliseum in December 2022 and consisted of shows across Asia, North America, Europe, and Oceania.

== Concert synopsis ==
The Fear and Dreams World Tour is a concert that exploring humanity, emotion, and artistry, and uncovering inner strength and hope. It revolves around the themes of Fear and Dreams, with the performance divided into six segments – "Helpless", "Hopeless", "Restless", "Doubtless", "Fearless", and "Party" that featuring a medley of upbeat songs.

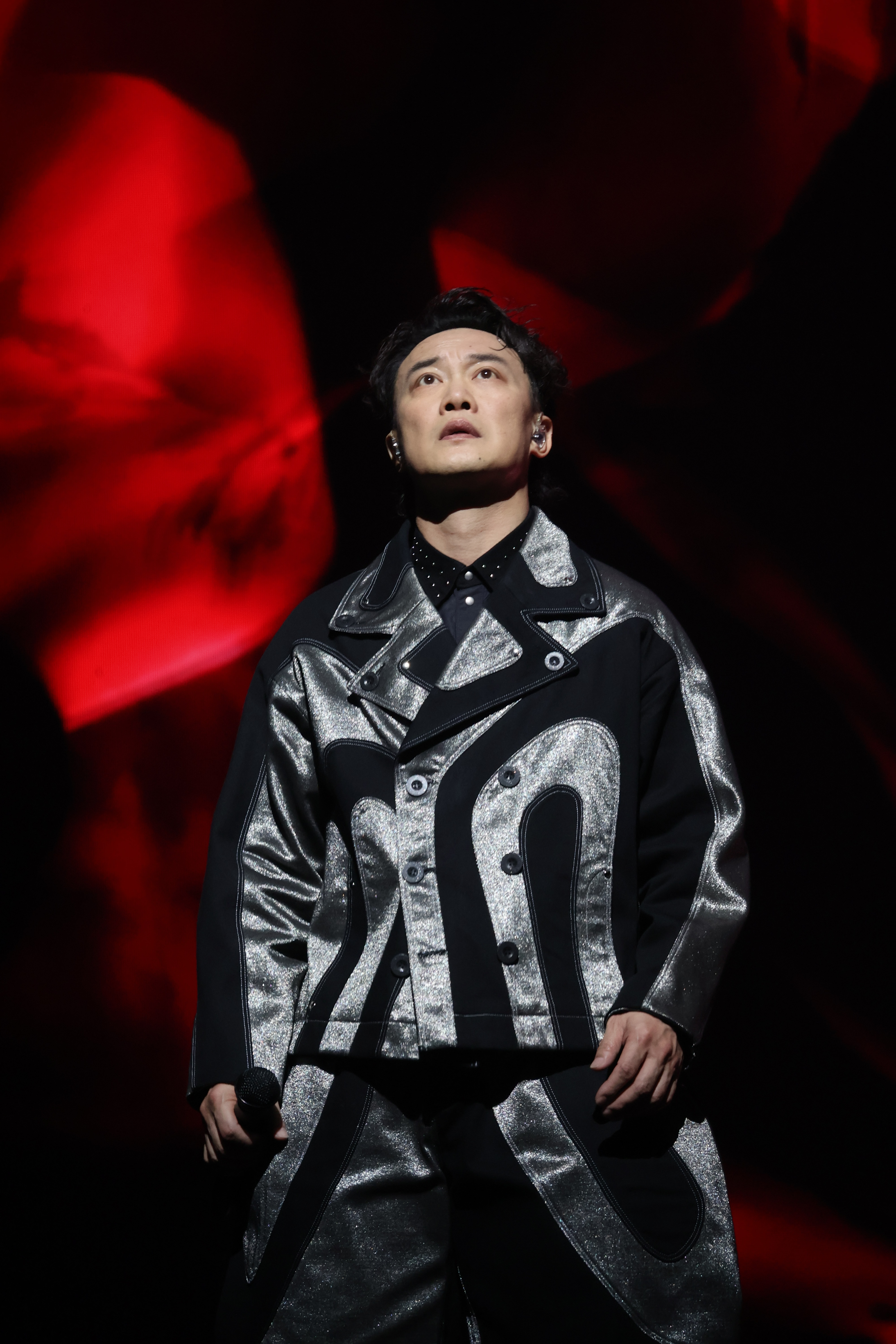
Chan performing in Guangzhou in January 2024

The concert theme, "Fear and Dreams", was decided by Chan before 2019. Despite the changes over the past few years, he feels that his initial thoughts remain unchanged, so he has kept the same title. Regarding the meaning of the theme, Chan stated, "Everyone feels it differently; it's better to interpret it after experiencing the concert in person."

== Commercial performance ==
Chan began selling tickets for his 18 Hong Kong concerts in October 2022, causing heavy traffic on the URBTIX ticketing system and setting a record for the longest traffic jam, which lasted 13 hours. Due to the overwhelming response, additional shows were added, resulting in a total of 27 performances at the Hong Kong Coliseum, setting a record for the most performances he has held at the venue. Chan then began his world tour in April 2023, performing across Asia, North America, Europe, and Oceania.

With his world tour, Chan became the first Hong Kong singer to hold seven consecutive shows at the Taipei Arena, which were sold out as soon as they opened, with box office revenue exceeding NT$240 million (US$7.6 million). In addition, Chan became the first Asian singer to perform at the Chase Center in San Francisco. He also set a record as the first Chinese singer to hold six arena-level concerts in North America, attracting a total audience of nearly 70,000 people across the region.

The Kaohsiung leg of the tour commenced ticket sales on March 23, 2025, utilizing a real-name ticketing system for all six scheduled performances. At the onset of the sale, more than 80,000 fans simultaneously accessed the online platform, resulting in a complete sell-out within minutes.

== Set list ==
The songs performed are mainly Cantopop songs and Mandopop songs by Eason Chan. This set list is representative of the show on August 8, 2025, in Macau. It is not intended to represent all shows throughout the tour.

1. a space odyssey (Chinese: 2001太空漫遊)
2. man vs god (Chinese: 人神鬥)
3. imagine a world without flowers (Chinese: 當這地球沒有花)
4. lies (Chinese: 謊言)
5. will it ever stop (Chinese: 時代巨輪)
6. what if (Chinese: 想聽)
7. bro & sis (Chinese: 兄妹)
8. the distance between hearts (Chinese: 心的距離)
9. us (Chinese: 我們)
10. speechless night (Chinese: 那一夜有沒有說)
11. red rose (Chinese: 紅玫瑰)
12. just let me be (Chinese: 開不了心)
13. farewell saha (Chinese: 告別娑婆)
14. the end (Chinese: 完)
15. today (Chinese: 今日)
16. it hasn’t happened yet (Chinese: 夢的可能)
17. long time no see (Chinese: 好久不見)
18. wander (Chinese: 任我行)
19. marathon (Chinese: 人生馬拉松)
20. the one who believes in you (Chinese: 相信你的人)
21. with you through the years (Chinese: 陪你度過漫長歲月)
22. the road (Chinese: 路...一直都在)
23. grown up (Chinese: 大人)
24. a dance for tomorrow (Chinese: 致明日的舞)
25. distant future (Chinese: 七百年後)
26. YGYS (Chinese: 愚人快樂)
27. long live to us (Chinese: 我們萬歲)
28. i’d live it all over again (Medley)
29. Encore

== Tour dates ==
List of tour dates
Date	City	Country	Venue	Attendance
December 9, 2022	Hong Kong		Hong Kong Coliseum	—
December 10, 2022	Hong Kong		Hong Kong Coliseum	—
December 11, 2022	Hong Kong		Hong Kong Coliseum	—
December 13, 2022	Hong Kong		Hong Kong Coliseum	—
December 14, 2022	Hong Kong		Hong Kong Coliseum	—
December 16, 2022	Hong Kong		Hong Kong Coliseum	—
December 17, 2022	Hong Kong		Hong Kong Coliseum	—
December 18, 2022	Hong Kong		Hong Kong Coliseum	—
December 20, 2022	Hong Kong		Hong Kong Coliseum	—
December 21, 2022	Hong Kong		Hong Kong Coliseum	—
December 22, 2022	Hong Kong		Hong Kong Coliseum	—
December 24, 2022	Hong Kong		Hong Kong Coliseum	—
December 25, 2022	Hong Kong		Hong Kong Coliseum	—
December 26, 2022	Hong Kong		Hong Kong Coliseum	—
December 28, 2022	Hong Kong		Hong Kong Coliseum	—
December 29, 2022	Hong Kong		Hong Kong Coliseum	—
December 30, 2022	Hong Kong		Hong Kong Coliseum	—
December 31, 2022	Hong Kong		Hong Kong Coliseum	—
January 2, 2023	Hong Kong		Hong Kong Coliseum	—
January 3, 2023	Hong Kong		Hong Kong Coliseum	—
January 6, 2023	Hong Kong		Hong Kong Coliseum	—
January 7, 2023	Hong Kong		Hong Kong Coliseum	—
January 8, 2023	Hong Kong		Hong Kong Coliseum	—
January 10, 2023	Hong Kong		Hong Kong Coliseum	—
January 11, 2023	Hong Kong		Hong Kong Coliseum	—
January 13, 2023	Hong Kong		Hong Kong Coliseum	—
January 14, 2023	Hong Kong		Hong Kong Coliseum	—
April 15, 2023	Singapore		Singapore Indoor Stadium	—
April 16, 2023	Singapore		Singapore Indoor Stadium	—
May 12, 2023	Kuala Lumpur	Malaysia	Axiata Arena	30,000
May 13, 2023	Kuala Lumpur	Malaysia	Axiata Arena	30,000
May 14, 2023	Kuala Lumpur	Malaysia	Axiata Arena	30,000
July 15, 2023	Taipei	Taiwan	Taipei Arena	70,000
July 16, 2023	Taipei	Taiwan	Taipei Arena	70,000
July 18, 2023	Taipei	Taiwan	Taipei Arena	70,000
July 19, 2023	Taipei	Taiwan	Taipei Arena	70,000
July 21, 2023	Taipei	Taiwan	Taipei Arena	70,000
July 22, 2023	Taipei	Taiwan	Taipei Arena	70,000
July 23, 2023	Taipei	Taiwan	Taipei Arena	70,000
August 30, 2023	New York City	United States	Barclays Center	70,000
September 6, 2023	Toronto	Canada	Scotiabank Arena	70,000
September 10, 2023	Chicago	United States	United Center	70,000
September 15, 2023	Anaheim	United States	Honda Center	70,000
September 20, 2023	San Francisco	United States	Chase Center	70,000
September 25, 2023	Vancouver	Canada	Pacific Coliseum	70,000
October 13, 2023	Macau		Cotai Arena	—
October 14, 2023	Macau		Cotai Arena	—
October 15, 2023	Macau		Cotai Arena	—
October 26, 2023	Macau		Cotai Arena	—
October 27, 2023	Macau		Cotai Arena	—
October 28, 2023	Macau		Cotai Arena	—
October 29, 2023	Macau		Cotai Arena	—
October 31, 2023	Macau		Cotai Arena	—
November 1, 2023	Macau		Cotai Arena	—
November 11, 2023	Shanghai	China	Mercedes-Benz Arena	60,000
November 12, 2023	Shanghai	China	Mercedes-Benz Arena	60,000
November 13, 2023	Shanghai	China	Mercedes-Benz Arena	60,000
November 17, 2023	Shanghai	China	Mercedes-Benz Arena	60,000
November 18, 2023	Shanghai	China	Mercedes-Benz Arena	60,000
November 19, 2023	Shanghai	China	Mercedes-Benz Arena	60,000
December 1, 2023	Chengdu	China	Dong'an Lake Sports Park Multifunctional Hall	—
December 2, 2023	Chengdu	China	Dong'an Lake Sports Park Multifunctional Hall	—
December 3, 2023	Chengdu	China	Dong'an Lake Sports Park Multifunctional Hall	—
December 8, 2023	Chengdu	China	Dong'an Lake Sports Park Multifunctional Hall	—
December 9, 2023	Chengdu	China	Dong'an Lake Sports Park Multifunctional Hall	—
December 10, 2023	Chengdu	China	Dong'an Lake Sports Park Multifunctional Hall	—
December 29, 2023	Guangzhou	China	Guangzhou International Sports Arena	—
December 30, 2023	Guangzhou	China	Guangzhou International Sports Arena	—
December 31, 2023	Guangzhou	China	Guangzhou International Sports Arena	—
January 5, 2024	Guangzhou	China	Guangzhou International Sports Arena	—
January 6, 2024	Guangzhou	China	Guangzhou International Sports Arena	—
January 7, 2024	Guangzhou	China	Guangzhou International Sports Arena	—
January 19, 2024	Xiamen	China	Xiamen Strait Grand Theater	50,000
January 20, 2024	Xiamen	China	Xiamen Strait Grand Theater	50,000
January 21, 2024	Xiamen	China	Xiamen Strait Grand Theater	50,000
January 26, 2024	Xiamen	China	Xiamen Strait Grand Theater	50,000
January 27, 2024	Xiamen	China	Xiamen Strait Grand Theater	50,000
January 28, 2024	Xiamen	China	Xiamen Strait Grand Theater	50,000
March 15, 2024	Xi'an	China	Xi'an Olympic Sports Center Gymnasium	70,000
March 16, 2024	Xi'an	China	Xi'an Olympic Sports Center Gymnasium	70,000
March 17, 2024	Xi'an	China	Xi'an Olympic Sports Center Gymnasium	70,000
March 22, 2024	Xi'an	China	Xi'an Olympic Sports Center Gymnasium	70,000
March 23, 2024	Xi'an	China	Xi'an Olympic Sports Center Gymnasium	70,000
March 24, 2024	Xi'an	China	Xi'an Olympic Sports Center Gymnasium	70,000
April 5, 2024	Nanjing	China	Nanjing Youth Olympic Sports Park Arena	60,000
April 6, 2024	Nanjing	China	Nanjing Youth Olympic Sports Park Arena	60,000
April 7, 2024	Nanjing	China	Nanjing Youth Olympic Sports Park Arena	60,000
April 12, 2024	Nanjing	China	Nanjing Youth Olympic Sports Park Arena	60,000
April 13, 2024	Nanjing	China	Nanjing Youth Olympic Sports Park Arena	60,000
April 14, 2024	Nanjing	China	Nanjing Youth Olympic Sports Park Arena	60,000
April 26, 2024	Wuhan	China	Optics Valley International Tennis Center	—
April 27, 2024	Wuhan	China	Optics Valley International Tennis Center	—
April 28, 2024	Wuhan	China	Optics Valley International Tennis Center	—
May 3, 2024	Wuhan	China	Optics Valley International Tennis Center	—
May 4, 2024	Wuhan	China	Optics Valley International Tennis Center	—
May 5, 2024	Wuhan	China	Optics Valley International Tennis Center	—
May 17, 2024	Hangzhou	China	Hangzhou Olympic Sports Center	—
May 18, 2024	Hangzhou	China	Hangzhou Olympic Sports Center	—
May 19, 2024	Hangzhou	China	Hangzhou Olympic Sports Center	—
May 24, 2024	Hangzhou	China	Hangzhou Olympic Sports Center	—
August 9, 2024	Ningbo	China	Ningbo Olympic Sports Center Gymnasium	—
August 10, 2024	Ningbo	China	Ningbo Olympic Sports Center Gymnasium	—
August 11, 2024	Ningbo	China	Ningbo Olympic Sports Center Gymnasium	—
August 16, 2024	Ningbo	China	Ningbo Olympic Sports Center Gymnasium	—
August 17, 2024	Ningbo	China	Ningbo Olympic Sports Center Gymnasium	—
August 18, 2024	Ningbo	China	Ningbo Olympic Sports Center Gymnasium	—
August 30, 2024	Dalian	China	Dalian Sports Centre Stadium	—
August 31, 2024	Dalian	China	Dalian Sports Centre Stadium	—
September 1, 2024	Dalian	China	Dalian Sports Centre Stadium	—
September 6, 2024	Dalian	China	Dalian Sports Centre Stadium	—
September 7, 2024	Dalian	China	Dalian Sports Centre Stadium	—
September 8, 2024	Dalian	China	Dalian Sports Centre Stadium	—
September 28, 2024	Hangzhou	China	Hangzhou Olympic Sports Center	—
September 29, 2024	Hangzhou	China	Hangzhou Olympic Sports Center	—
September 30, 2024	Hangzhou	China	Hangzhou Olympic Sports Center	—
October 4, 2024	Hangzhou	China	Hangzhou Olympic Sports Center	—
October 5, 2024	Hangzhou	China	Hangzhou Olympic Sports Center	—
October 6, 2024	Hangzhou	China	Hangzhou Olympic Sports Center	—
October 25, 2024	Quanzhou	China	Jinjiang Second Sports Center	—
October 26, 2024	Quanzhou	China	Jinjiang Second Sports Center	—
October 27, 2024	Quanzhou	China	Jinjiang Second Sports Center	—
November 1, 2024	Quanzhou	China	Jinjiang Second Sports Center	—
November 2, 2024	Quanzhou	China	Jinjiang Second Sports Center	—
November 3, 2024	Quanzhou	China	Jinjiang Second Sports Center	—
November 15, 2024	Suzhou	China	Suzhou Olympic Sports Center	—
November 16, 2024	Suzhou	China	Suzhou Olympic Sports Center	—
November 17, 2024	Suzhou	China	Suzhou Olympic Sports Center	—
November 22, 2024	Suzhou	China	Suzhou Olympic Sports Center	—
November 23, 2024	Suzhou	China	Suzhou Olympic Sports Center	—
November 24, 2024	Suzhou	China	Suzhou Olympic Sports Center	—
December 6, 2024	Shenzhen	China	Shenzhen Bay Sports Center	—
December 7, 2024	Shenzhen	China	Shenzhen Bay Sports Center	—
December 8, 2024	Shenzhen	China	Shenzhen Bay Sports Center	—
December 13, 2024	Shenzhen	China	Shenzhen Bay Sports Center	—
December 14, 2024	Shenzhen	China	Shenzhen Bay Sports Center	—
December 15, 2024	Shenzhen	China	Shenzhen Bay Sports Center	—
December 27, 2024	Hefei	China	Shaoqian Sports Center Gymnasium	—
December 28, 2024	Hefei	China	Shaoqian Sports Center Gymnasium	—
December 29, 2024	Hefei	China	Shaoqian Sports Center Gymnasium	—
January 3, 2025	Hefei	China	Shaoqian Sports Center Gymnasium	—
January 4, 2025	Hefei	China	Shaoqian Sports Center Gymnasium	—
January 5, 2025	Hefei	China	Shaoqian Sports Center Gymnasium	—
January 17, 2025	Foshan	China	GBA International Sports and Cultural Center	—
January 18, 2025	Foshan	China	GBA International Sports and Cultural Center	—
January 19, 2025	Foshan	China	GBA International Sports and Cultural Center	—
January 24, 2025	Foshan	China	GBA International Sports and Cultural Center	—
January 25, 2025	Foshan	China	GBA International Sports and Cultural Center	—
January 26, 2025	Foshan	China	GBA International Sports and Cultural Center	—
March 14, 2025	Sydney	Australia	Qudos Bank Arena	—
March 15, 2025	Sydney	Australia	Qudos Bank Arena	—
March 28, 2025	Chongqing	China	Huaxi Live · Yudong Sports and Culture Center	—
March 29, 2025	Chongqing	China	Huaxi Live · Yudong Sports and Culture Center	—
March 30, 2025	Chongqing	China	Huaxi Live · Yudong Sports and Culture Center	—
April 4, 2025	Chongqing	China	Huaxi Live · Yudong Sports and Culture Center	—
April 5, 2025	Chongqing	China	Huaxi Live · Yudong Sports and Culture Center	—
April 6, 2025	Chongqing	China	Huaxi Live · Yudong Sports and Culture Center	—
April 16, 2025	London	England	The O_{2} Arena	—
April 17, 2025	London	England	The O_{2} Arena	—
May 3, 2025	Tokyo	Japan	K-Arena Yokohama	—
May 23, 2025	Kaohsiung	Taiwan	Kaohsiung Arena	—
May 24, 2025	Kaohsiung	Taiwan	Kaohsiung Arena	—
May 25, 2025	Kaohsiung	Taiwan	Kaohsiung Arena	—
May 29, 2025	Kaohsiung	Taiwan	Kaohsiung Arena	—
May 30, 2025	Kaohsiung	Taiwan	Kaohsiung Arena	—
May 31, 2025	Kaohsiung	Taiwan	Kaohsiung Arena	—
June 14, 2025	Haikou	China	Wuyuan River Stadium	—
June 15, 2025	Haikou	China	Wuyuan River Stadium	—
June 20, 2025	Haikou	China	Wuyuan River Stadium	—
June 21, 2025	Haikou	China	Wuyuan River Stadium	—
June 22, 2025	Haikou	China	Wuyuan River Stadium	—
July 11, 2025	Beijing	China	Wukesong Arena	—
July 12, 2025	Beijing	China	Wukesong Arena	—
July 13, 2025	Beijing	China	Wukesong Arena	—
July 18, 2025	Beijing	China	Wukesong Arena	—
July 19, 2025	Beijing	China	Wukesong Arena	—
July 20, 2025	Beijing	China	Wukesong Arena	—
August 1, 2025	Macau		Galaxy Arena	—
August 2, 2025	Macau		Galaxy Arena	—
August 3, 2025	Macau		Galaxy Arena	—
August 8, 2025	Macau		Galaxy Arena	—
August 9, 2025	Macau		Galaxy Arena	—
August 10, 2025	Macau		Galaxy Arena	—
Total				N/A
