= Herpystis esson =

Scientific classification
- Kingdom: Animalia
- Phylum: Arthropoda
- Class: Insecta
- Order: Lepidoptera
- Family: Tortricidae
- Genus: Herpystis
- Species: H. esson

Binomial name
- Herpystis esson Razowski, 2013

Species of moth

Herpystis esson is a species of moth of the family Tortricidae. It is found in New Caledonia, a special collectivity of France located in the southwest Pacific Ocean.

The wingspan is about 13 mm.

== Etymology ==
The species name refers to the size of the species and is derived from Greek esson (meaning weaker, smaller).
