= Guangxi Sports Centre Stadium =

Sports venue in Nanning, Guangxi, China

Guangxi Sports Center Stadium
- Interactive map of Guangxi Sports Center Stadium
- Full name: 广西体育中心体育场
- Location: Nanning, Guangxi, China
- Coordinates: 22.7630°N 108.3895°E
- Capacity: 58,547

The Guangxi Sports Centre Stadium is a multi-purpose stadium inside the Guangxi Sports Center in Nanning, Guangxi, China. It is currently used mostly for football matches. The stadium has a capacity of 58,547.

== See also ==
- List of football stadiums in China
- List of stadiums in China
- Lists of stadiums
