= Jamie Eason =

American fitness model and writer

Jamie Eason Middleton
- Born: Jamie Eason; April 10, 1976 (age 50); Houston, Texas U.S.
- Education: Texas A&M University
- Occupations: Personal trainer, businesswoman, writer
- Height: 5 ft 2 in (157 cm).
- Spouse: Michael Middleton
- Children: 2

Jamie Eason (born April 10, 1976) is an American fitness model and writer. She is also a former NFL cheerleader and winner of the World's Fittest Model competition. She has been the featured subject and cover girl on many fitness and women's magazines. She is currently a full-time spokesperson for Bodybuilding.com, and is developing a line of swimwear and recently launched a supplement line with Labrada Nutrition. Eason is known as representing healthy fitness and femininity.

== Early life ==
Eason was born April 10, 1976 in Houston, Texas. She also has an older brother.

== Career ==
=== Early career ===
2001, after graduating from college and while working for her grandfather's roofing company, she tried-out for the new Houston Texans cheerleading squad. She was one of thirty-five contestants selected in a rigorous two-day process.

During her career as a Houston Texans cheerleader, she was diagnosed with breast cancer, forcing her to a desk job. Her inactive lifestyle and poor nutrition took an additional toll on her body. To get in shape, she joined a local gym. She continued to work-out and improve but was dissatisfied with her results. After consulting a nutritionist, she was put on a proper diet to transform her body.

=== Later career ===
Eason was 'discovered' at a fitness competition in Austin, Texas. She received a pro card after her first fitness competition in 2006 at the Hardbody Entertainment Model Search at the Olympia.

As a spokes-model, Eason is known as "the female face" of Bodybuilding.com. She also focuses on removing the stereotype athletic women are unfeminine. Eason says she regrets some of her earlier photo-shoots showing more skin during her younger days. She continues fitness modeling, but encourages women in fitness and modeling to never show a lot of skin... saying "It's not worth it." Her training-style mostly revolves around weight-training; she says she prefers that over cardio training, so she doesn't do cardio training a lot but focuses on weight training.

== Personal life ==
She was diagnosed with breast cancer at 22 years old, and at the age of 28, an injury revealed she has Spina Bifida Occulta, a minor form of the disease. She married Michael Middleton, a fellow workout enthusiast and Worship Leader in their church, on July 18, 2012. Eason had a son, August in 2013. She had a second son, Beau at 40 years old in 2016.
