= Eason Chan =

Hong Kong singer and actor (born 1974)

- 陳奕迅
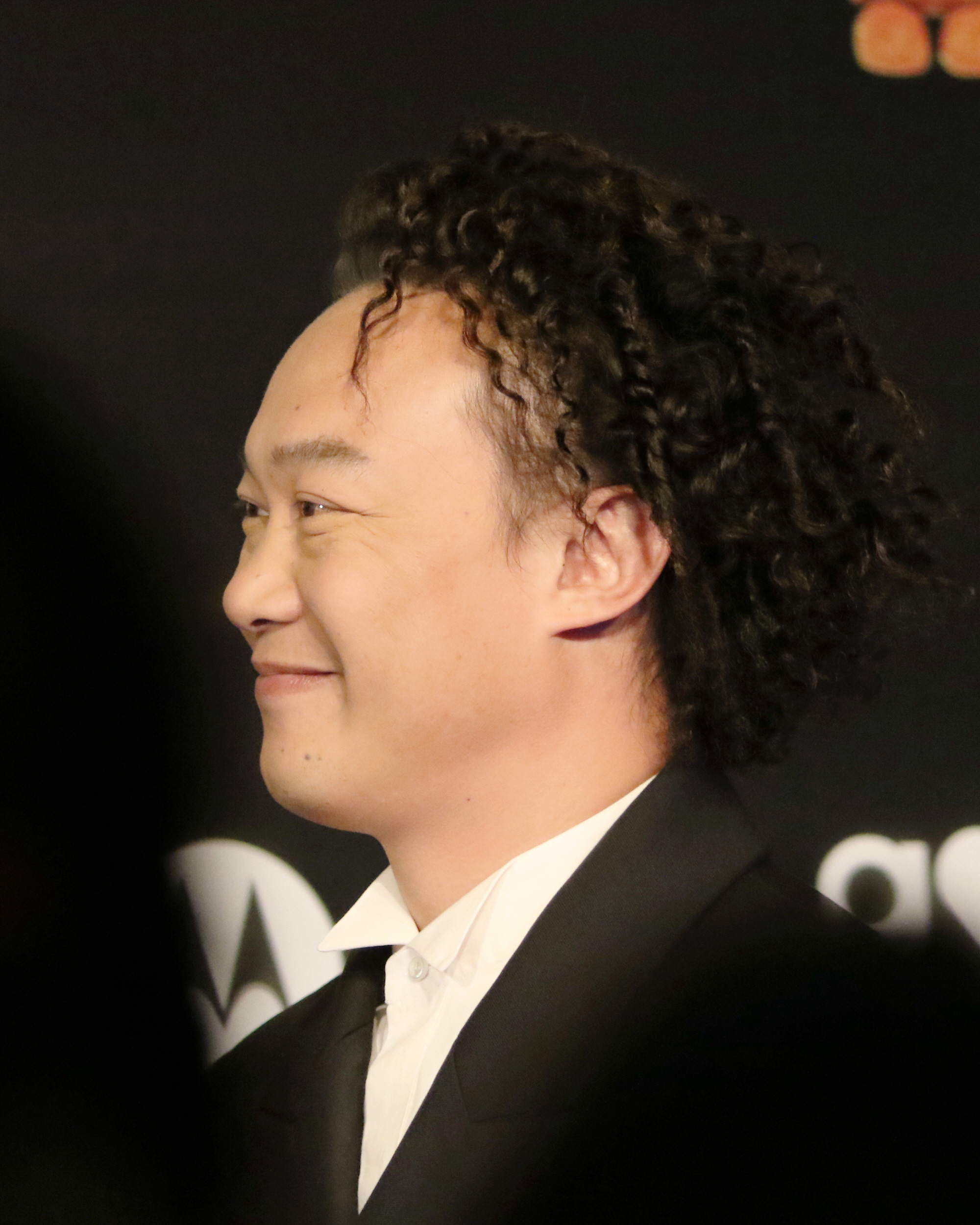
- Chan in 2016
- Born: 27 July 1974 (age 52); British Hong Kong
- Education: Kingston University; Royal Academy of Music
- Occupations: Singer; actor
- Years active: 1995–present
- Spouse: Hilary Tsui (m. 2006)
- Children: Constance Chan
- Musical career
- Also known as: God of E (E神，醫神)
- Genres: Cantopop; mandopop; R&B; pop rock
- Instruments: Vocals; piano; guitar; violin; harmonica; kazoo; drums; accordion

Chinese name
- Traditional Chinese: 陳奕迅
- Simplified Chinese: 陈奕迅
Transcriptions
Standard Mandarin
- Hanyu Pinyin: Chén Yìxùn
Yue: Cantonese
- Jyutping: Can4 Jik6seon3

Eason Chan Yick-shun (simplified Chinese: 陈奕迅; traditional Chinese: 陳奕迅; pinyin: Chén Yìxùn; Jyutping: Can4 Jik6 Seon3; Cantonese Yale: Chàhn Yihk Seun; born 27 July 1974) is a Hong Kong singer and actor. He is one of the most popular and influential singers in both Cantopop and Mandopop. Besides holding the record for winning the "Ultimate Male Singer – Gold" award (10 times) and "My Favorite Male Singer" award (9 consecutive years) at the "Ultimate Song Chart Awards Presentation" in HK, he is also holding the record for being nominated for and winning prestigious Golden Melody Awards "Best Male Mandarin Singer" (9 times and 3 times respectively) in Taiwan. Chan was ranked sixth in the 2013 Forbes China Celebrity Top 100 List. Chan was ranked third in Spotify Global Top Mandopop Artists of the Years 2023 and 2024. By December 2024, Chan's monthly listeners in Spotify was over 4 million.

Chan is a frequent winner of Asia's music awards. He has won a number of prestigious Golden Melody Awards in Taiwan. In 2003, he won Best Mandarin Male Singer and Best Mandarin Album for "Special Thanks To...." In 2009, he won Best Mandarin Album for "Don't Want to Let Go". Chan won his second Best Mandarin Male Singer award in 2015, for the album "Rice and Shine". In 2018, Chan was named Best Mandarin Male Singer for the third time – the most of any singer (tied with Johnny Yin) – for the album "C'mon In~".

Chan has kicked off over 300 concerts all around the world since 1999. He successfully held world tours in different regions, including Hong Kong, Macau, Taiwan, mainland China, Southeast Asia, Europe, North America and Australia. He was the first Chinese singer who held tour in London's O2 Arena, and the first HK singer who held solo concerts in Beijing's National Stadium (Bird's Nest). In 2014, Chan's net worth was HK$100 million. In 2020, Chan was on Forbes Asia's inaugural 100 Digital Stars list. Chan was the most-streamed artist in Hong Kong on the Spotify music streaming platform from 2016 to 2021. Since joining UMG, Chan has amassed over 75 billion streams across various platforms by 2023.

== Early life ==
Chan was born in Hong Kong on 27 July 1974. Chan went to England to study when he was 12. He attended St. Joseph's kindergarten and St. Joseph's College Primary School in Hong Kong, Dauntsey's School in Wiltshire, England and later Kingston University, studying architecture. He also trained in vocals at the Royal Academy of Music, where he received Grade-8 vocal certifications. Chan returned to Hong Kong before the completion of his degree to participate in the 1995 New Talent Singing Awards Competition, winning first place on 16 July 1995, and signed to Capital Artists, ending his future career as an architect while launching a career in music.

== Career ==
Chan has been praised by critics and fellow musicians alike as one of the top singers of his generation. Since the beginning of his career, he has been considered one of the favourites to lead the new generation of Cantopop. He has been described as a breath of fresh air in the HK music scene. In the 2000s, Chan emerged as the leading male singer of his generation, becoming an innovator and a leader in the HK music scene, winning many prestigious awards.

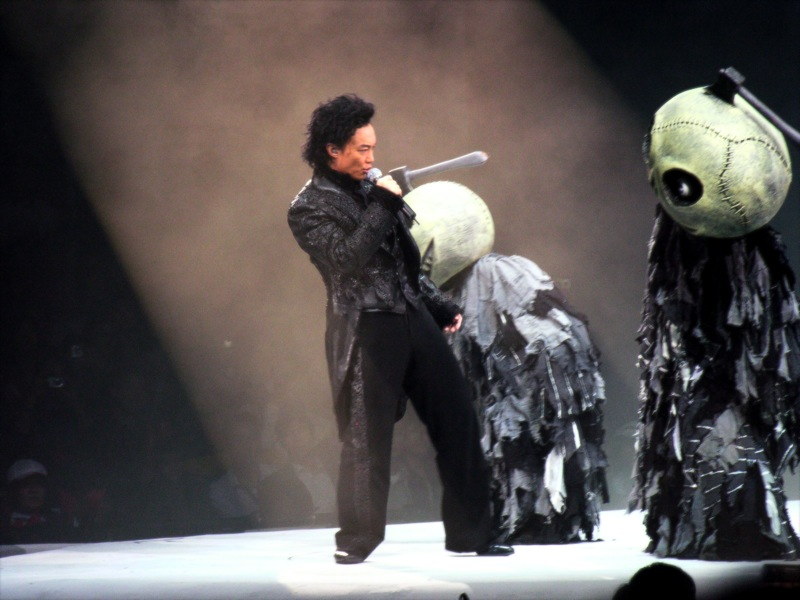
Chan performing in 2006

Chan won many major music awards in Hong Kong, e.g. Most Popular Male Singer award in the Jade Solid Gold Best Ten Music Awards Presentation twice, in 2006 and 2007.

His Cantonese album "U87", named after his favourite microphone and released in 2005, was labeled by Time magazine as one of the five Asian albums worth buying. "U87" was the top selling non-concert, non-collection category album in Hong Kong in 2005. He was Hong Kong's highest selling male artist in 2002, 2003 and 2007. He has been one of Hong Kong's top selling artists every year since 2000. His concert DVD "Get a Life" was the highest selling album of 2006.

Chan has also been successful in his work in the Mandopop scene. He has won numerous awards in both mainland China and Taiwan, most notably Taiwan's Golden Melody Awards. He is the second non-Taiwanese singer, after Jacky Cheung, to win Taiwan's Golden Melody Awards. He won "Best Male Mandarin Singer" third, in 2003, 2015 and 2018, "Album of the Year" twice in 2003 and 2018, and "Best Mandarin Album" in 2009.

His album "Admit It" was nominated for Golden Melody Awards' Best Male Singer; although it was ultimately won by Gary Chaw. Next year, he was again nominated for Golden Melody Awards' Best Male Singer, for his work in Mandarin album "Don't Want To Let Go", although the award went to Jay Chou. However, Chan won Album of The Year for "Don't Want To Let Go".

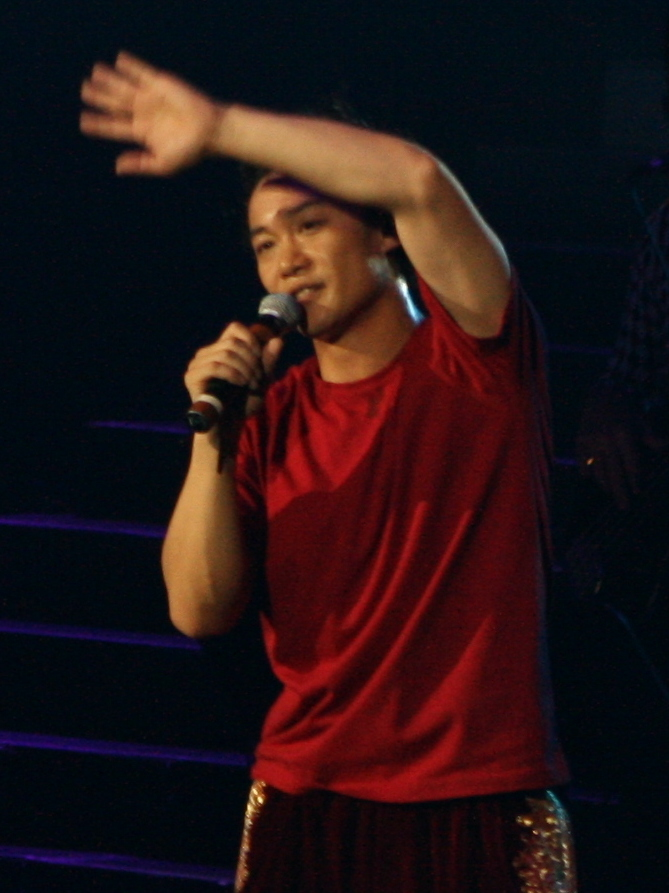
Chan in 2008

Chan has won a number of Asian music awards as well. He won his first Asia Pacific's Most Popular Singer Award in 2007, and again in 2008.

Chan has been named by Chinese critics as the next God of Songs (歌神) after Jacky Cheung. However, Eason has more than once clarified that he wishes to build his own name instead, and not just be the successor of Jacky Cheung. Chan and Cheung sung a duet together, titled 天下太平, on the album "Perfect Match", released in April 2006. Chan and Cheung collaborated on other occasions as well.

Chan played several instruments in his live concerts, including the piano, the guitar, the harmonica, and the accordion. Chan is also a songwriter.

In 2009, Chan performed in "PAX Musica 2009" in Tokyo. He sang seven songs, including a Japanese song by Koji Tamaki called "Mr. Lonely". This was his first time performing in Japan publicly. Japanese Musician Ikurō Fujiwara praised Chan for his charisma on stage and expressed hope to collaborate with Chan in the future. Chan planned to promote his musical works in Japan in 2010.

In 2011, Chan released a new Cantonese album titled "Stranger Under My Skin" on 22 February. Released in November, Chan's Mandarin album titled "?" features a piano performance by his seven-year-old daughter. Chan released the "...3mm" Cantonese album on 10 August 2012 followed by a remix version of the album, titled "...3mm Remix" releasing on 8 November 2012. It was an album by Eric Kwok and Jerald Chan in composing music, including the number one songs "Finish" (Chinese: 完) and "Heavy taste" (Chinese: 重口味). At the same time, Chan opened his own music production company, EAS Music.

In 2014, Chan received Honorary Doctor of Arts degree for accomplishments in the Cantonese music industry from Kingston University, where he studied architecture before entering the entertainment industry. In 2015, Chan released a Cantonese album "Preparing" 《準備中》, which contained the number one song "Unconditional" (無條件). Chan received multiple awards for the work.

In 2017, Chan released a Mandarin album, "C'mon In~ ", which was awarded at the 29th Golden Melody Awards for Album of the Year and Best Male Mandarin Singer. Besides holding the record for winning Best Male Mandarin Singer (tying the record of Taiwanese singer Johnny Yin), he also became the Hong Kong singer with the most awards for that category.

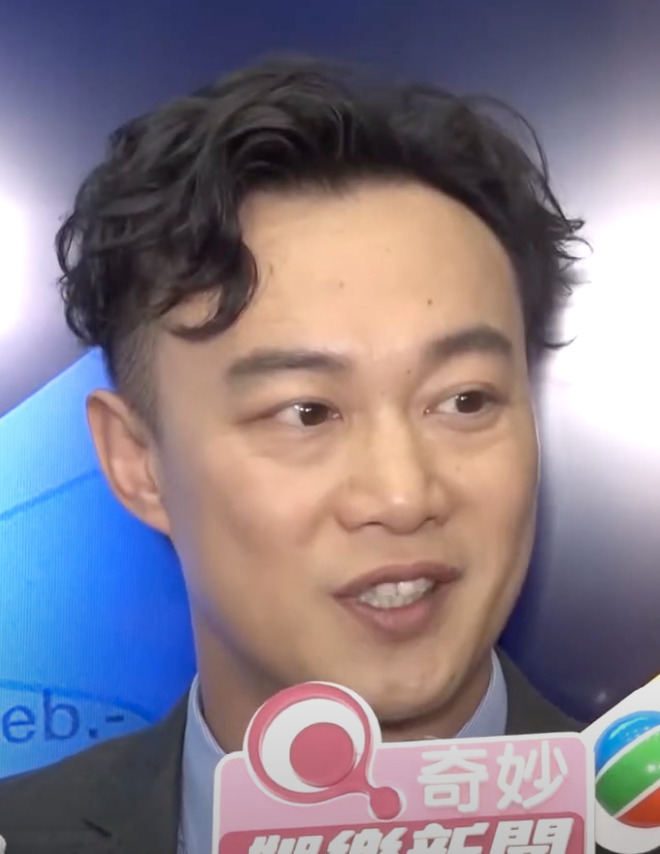
Chan in 2018

In 2018, Chan released album "L.O.V.E." (mainly in Cantonese), which was successful in Taiwan's 30th Golden Melody Awards, winning nominations to three major awards: Song of the Year, Album of the Year, and Producer of the Year, Album. Ultimately, the album's producer, Carl Wong, won the "Producer of the Year, Album" award. This was the first time in the history of the Golden Melody Awards that a Cantonese album won this award.

Chan's Mandarin single "Warrior of the Darkness" (孤勇者), released in November 2021 for Riot Games' series Arcane : League of Legends Season 1, was a super hit and skyrocketed to become a phenomenon in the Mandarin music market. On top of Mandopop fans, it was exceptionally popular among kids. With less than two years since its release, the song has garnered over 8.4 billion streams, making it the biggest digital song in UMG China's history.

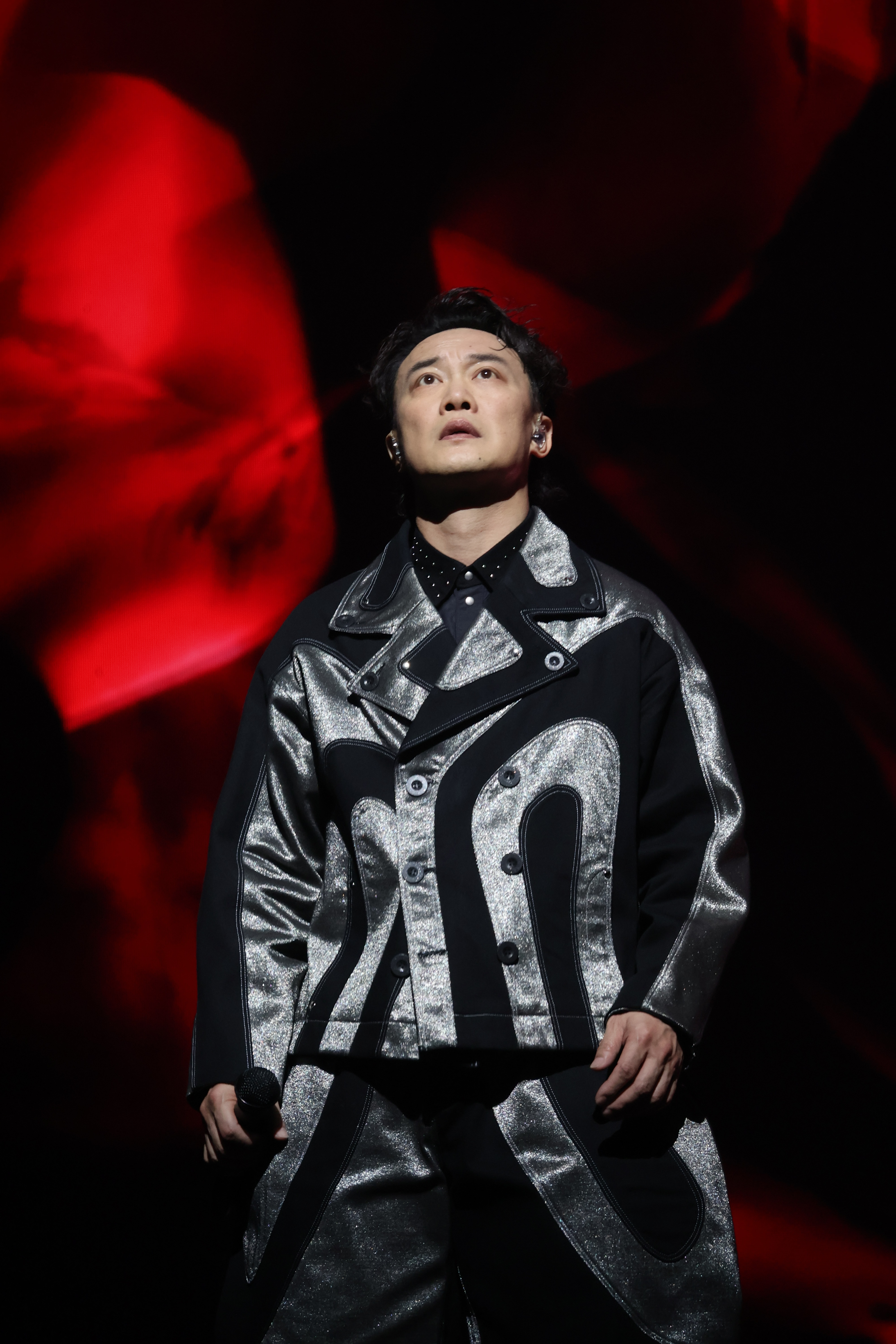
Chan performing in Guangzhou in 2024

More than 28 years after Chan's debut, he kept releasing new albums, such as "Chin Up!", and going on his Fear and Dreams world tour in 2023. “Homo Sapiens”, a Cantonese song from "Chin Up!", was awarded at the 34th Golden Melody Awards for Best Lyrics. This was the first time that a Cantonese song won this award.

Chan released a Chinese theme song again for Riot Games' series Arcane: League of Legends Season 2 in November 2024. The song "Isha's Song" (這樣很好) was featured in the official Arcane Season Two soundtrack.

In April 2025, NetEase Cloud Music named Chan as the most-shared artist with his music being shared more than 150 million times and as the artist with the highest number of songs surpassing 100 million streams at 66 songs in the platform's 12-year history.

=== Musical ===
On 18 and 19 August 2005, Chan performed the musical Wrestling with God (人神鬥), the second programme of Love Music Tour 2005 organised by Netvigator. He was the actor and producer. Stars featured in the show included famous comedian Jim Chim (詹瑞文), singer Wilfred Lau (劉浩龍), Taiwanese singer Mavis Fan (范曉萱), Best Supporting Actress Winner of the 23rd Hong Kong Film Awards Josie Ho (何超儀), pop duo at17 and Soler. The story was about the competition among different angels (played by the featured stars) to protect the only man alive in the world (played by Eason Chan). The secret guest, veteran singer George Lam (林子祥), played Chan's late father. The audience were impressed by the performers, who told the story through song and dance.

== Charity work ==
Chan has been appointed as Orbis International's Sight Ambassador in Hong Kong since 2006. He has travelled to India and Sichuan, China, visiting kids and elders with visual impairment, to raise funds for Orbis. Chan has also been an active participant in Hong Kong's fundraising campaigns such as the 2003 fundraiser for SARS victims and the 2008 fundraiser for Sichuan earthquake victims.

On 7 July 2007, Chan performed at the Chinese leg of 'Live Earth' in Shanghai. In 2018, Chan led the band, Eason and the duo band, to hold a charity concert “L.O.V.E. is L.I.V.E.” for the needy from several charitable organizations to deliver positive energy to the society. In July 2020, Chan held the online charity concert, The Live Is So Much Better With Music Eason Chan Charity Concert, in an open area next to K11 Musea in the early morning, and at the Hong Kong Coliseum in the late afternoon in support of the Hong Kong Live Performance and Production Industry Association. Chan performed in an empty stadium due to the COVID-19 restrictions.

== Personal life ==
In 2002, Chan suffered a severe groin injury when he fell off the stage during his concert in Taiwan. As a result, one of his testicles was injured and required treatment, although he has since fully recovered.

In 2006, he married former actress Hilary Tsui (徐濠縈) with whom he has a daughter, Constance, born 2004. When Constance was 2 years old, she was featured on the cover of Life Continues album. In 2012, there was rumour about their marriage was faltering due to Tsui's drug scandal. The couple held a press conference to deny all rumours and allegations.

In 2013, Chan revealed he had suffered from bipolar disorder and phobia of large crowds during the 11th night of his "Life Concert 2013". In 2020, Chan has been appointed as the "Shall We Talk" initiative's ambassador to promote mental health and arouse public attention to mental well-being. His classic Canto-pop song, "Shall We Talk", has been chosen as the theme song.

In May 2025, Chan contracted COVID-19, leading to the cancelation of his planned concert in Kaohsiung, Taiwan.

=== Support for Xinjiang-sourced cotton ===
On 25 March 2021, Chan's company, My Kan Wonderland Limited announced on Weibo that the company would "resolutely boycott any behaviour vilifying China" and that the company would terminate its role as a brand ambassador for Adidas, leading to public backlash against Chan. The announcement came after Adidas and other members of the Better Cotton Initiative had publicly resolved to not use cotton sourced from Xinjiang and also following a BBC investigation that found that Uyghur forced labor was being used in the production of cotton in the region. The South China Morning Post reported that, after the announcement was made, Chan's Facebook page, which did not mention the boycott, was flooded with "thousands [of] comments sharply critical of the move" and that "[a]ccording to the United Nations, human rights groups and victim testimonials, China has placed at least 1 million Uygurs and other ethnic minorities in high security camps, where they are subjected to indoctrination, torture and forced labour." China maintains that claims of forced labor in Xinjiang are "entirely fabricated".

== Awards and recognition ==
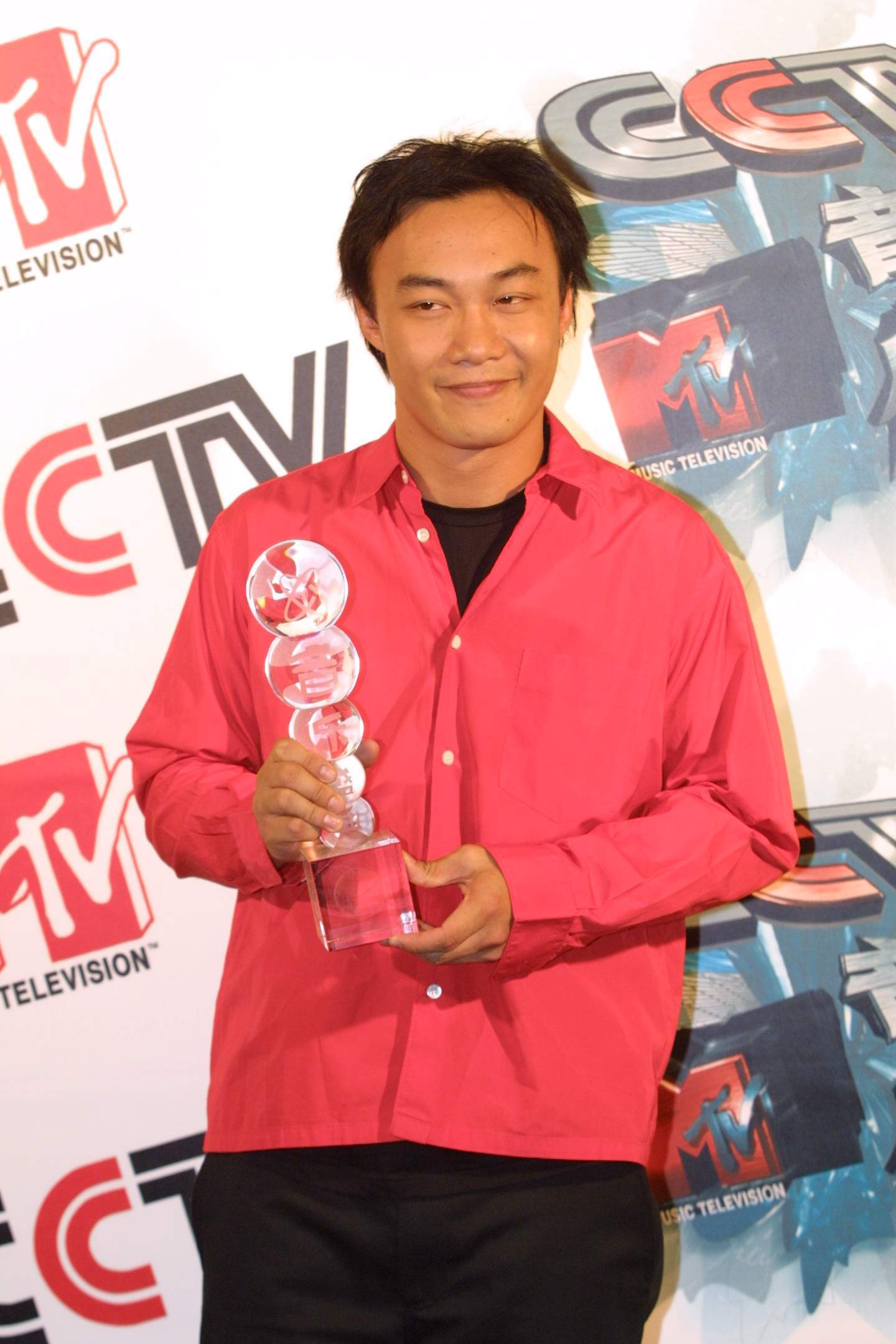
Eason Chan at the CCTV-MTV music award ceremony in Beijing in July 2002

Over 20 years since his debut, he has released more than 40 albums and won numerous renowned awards in Hong Kong, Taiwan, mainland China and Southeast Asia. In Hong Kong, Chan is the big winner of music awards. He is holding the record for winning major awards in CRHK's "Ultimate Song Chart Awards Presentation", including nine times of "Supreme Grand Prix du Disque" (叱咤樂壇至尊唱片大獎); seven times of "Grand Song Award" (叱咤樂壇至尊歌曲大獎) for "K Song King" (2000), "Magnificent Sunset" (2005), "Seven Hundred Years Later" (2009), "Flavours" (2012), "The Wind Took" (2013), "Unconditional" (2015) and “Four Seasons" (2016); ten times of "Ultimate Male Singer Gold"; nine consecutive times of "My Most Favorite Male Singer"; and five times of "My Most Favorite Song" awards.

Chan is also holding the record for winning “Most Outstanding Male Singer" award for 13 consecutive years, and "Global Chinese Gold Song" award (全球華人至尊金曲獎) for ten times in RTHK's Top Ten Chinese Gold Songs Award. Chan has won a number of TVB's "Top Ten Golden Melody Awards", Male Singer of the Year awards and Album Of The Year awards. Chan is highly recognized by media for his distinguished achievements in Cantopop, and is holding the record for winning five times of "Four Channels – Media Award" (四台聯頒傳媒大獎).

In 2005, Chan's Cantonese album "U87" was named one of Time magazine's "Five Asian Albums Worth Buying". This album not only won the top sale of Cantonese Album, but also won six awards in "Ultimate Song Chart Awards Presentation".

Back in 1998, the songs "My Happy Times" and "Odyssey" gave a boost to Chan's career. In subsequent years, "God Bless Sweetheart", "Shall We Dance? Shall We Talk!" and songs brought Chan a number of awards. In 2004, Chan's career was troubled by contractual issues. When Chan changed to Cinepoly in 2005, songs such as "Magnificent Sunset" brought him further awards. In 2006 and 2007, the songs "Crazy", "Mount Fuji" and "Crying in the Party" were award-winning. In 2008, the song "The road has been in ..." increased Chan's audience and won awards. In 2009, the album "H3M" and the songs "Seven Hundred Years" and "Salon" were successful. He has been one of China's best-selling artists since 2000 and has won many prestigious awards. In 2013, the song The Wind Took won an award.

In Taiwan, Chan has won a number of prestigious Golden Melody Awards. In 2003, he won Best Mandarin Male Singer and Best Mandarin Album for "Special Thanks To...." In 2009, he won Best Mandarin Album again for "Don't Want to Let Go". Chan won his second Best Mandarin Male Singer award in 2015, for the album "Rice and Shine". In 2018, Chan was named Best Mandarin Male Singer for the third time – the most of any singer (tied with Johnny Yin) – for the album "C'mon In~". He is the only one Hong Kong singer who has won this award for three times.

== Discography ==
=== Cantonese studio albums ===
- Eason Chan (1996)
- Always Be with Me (1997)
- My Happy Days (1998)
- Blessed Love (1999)
- Nothing Really Matters (2000)
- Some Like it Hot (2000)
- Shall We Dance? Shall We Talk! (2001)
- The Easy Ride (2001)
- The Line-Up (2002)
- Live for Today (2003)
- U87 (2005)
- What's Going On ... ? (2006)
- Listen to Eason Chan (2007)
- H3M (2009)
- ... 3mm (2012)
- The Key (2013)
- Getting Ready (2015)
- L.O.V.E. (2018)
- Chin Up! (2023)

=== Mandarin studio albums ===
- A Drop of Tear (1997)
- Brewing (1998)
- Blessed Wedding (1999)
- It's Me, Eason (2001)
- Special Thanks to .. (2002)
- Black, White, Gray (2003)
- How (2005)
- Admit It (2007)
- Don't Want to Let Go (2008)
- 5/F Blissful (2009)
- ? (2011)
- Rice & Shine (2014)
- C'mon In~ (2017)

== Filmography ==
Chan is a notable actor, who has participated in over 40 films since his debut in 1997.

He was nominated for Best Supporting Actor in Hong Kong Film Awards in 2000 for his role in Lavender. In 2005, he was nominated for Best Actor by Hong Kong's Golden Bauhinia Awards for his work in Crazy N' The City. In 2008, he was nominated for Best Supporting Actor in Taiwan's Golden Horse Awards for his work in Trivial Matters.

In 2010, Chan participated in the romantic comedy film "Love in Space" with Aaron Kwok, Kwai Lun Mei and René Liu. In 2011, Chan participated in the film "Mr And Mrs Single" with Michelle Bai, playing a couple who met again after divorce, found themselves remarried. He voiced Po in the Cantonese version of Kungfu Panda in 2015. He also starred in a musical film "Office" with Chow Yun Fat, which was directed by Johnnie To. In 2016, he played Ma Li in Zhang Jiajia's 2016 movie See You Tomorrow, which was produced by Wong Kar-wai. He played a wasted rockstar who re-discovered his love for music after a heartbreak. In 2017, he played a school principal in the movie "Our Shining Days", and also sang the film's theme song.

In 2017, his leading role in a TV drama series My "Very Short Marriage" received lots of positive feedback from the professional movie critics and public. Chan was nominated for Best Actor in a Leading Role in The 23rd Asian Television Awards.

== Concerts ==
=== Major concert tours ===
- Eason's Moving on Stage World Tour (2007–2009)
- Duo World Tour (2010–2012)
- Eason's Life World Tour (2013–2016)
- Fear and Dreams World Tour (2022–2025)
