= Ohashi Trio =

Japanese singer-songwriter and composer (born 1978)

Ohashi Trio 大橋 トリオ
- Born: Yoshinori Ohashi; 12 July 1978 (age 47); Chiba, Japan
- Occupation: Singer · songwriter · composer · musician
- Years active: 2003–present
- Website: https://www.ohashi-trio.com/
- Musical career
- Genres: J-pop; film score
- Instruments: Vocals; piano; guitar; bass; drums; mandolin
- Labels: Patch Works Label (2006–2008); Rhythm Zone (2009–2019); A.S.A.B (2019–present)

Ohashi Trio (大橋トリオ; born 12 July 1978) is a Japanese singer-songwriter and composer. Throughout the early 2000s, Trio performed as a musician and producer, contributing to various albums and live shows under his birth name Yoshinori Ohashi (大橋 好規, Ohashi Yoshinori) before releasing his first self-produced album Pretaporter in 2007. His debut on Avex Group's Rhythm Zone, I Got Rhythm? (2009) topped the iTunes Store's albums chart. Throughout his career, he has released eighteen studio albums, seven singles and composed for multiple films.

== Discography ==
=== As Yoshinori Ohashi ===
==== Studio albums ====
Title	Year
Borderless	2008

==== Soundtrack ====
Year	Title
2006	Colours Original Soundtrack
2006	Baumkuchen Original Soundtrack
2006	Yomei 1 Kagetsu no Hanayome Original Soundtrack (余命1ヶ月の花嫁 オリジナル・サウンドトラック)
2006	Eiga Kaminari Sakura Original Soundtrack (映画 雷桜 オリジナル・サウンドトラック)
2006	Starman Kono Hoshi no Koi Original Soundtrack (スターマン･この星の恋 original soundtrack)
2006	P to JK Original Soundtrack (PとJK オリジナル・サウンドトラック)

==== Guest appearances ====
Year	Title	Other Artist(s)	Album
2006	Standing There ~Ima, Soko ni Iku yo~ (Standing There 〜いま、そこに行くよ〜)	Bonobos	Standing There ~Ima, Soko ni Iku yo~ (Standing There 〜いま、そこに行くよ〜)
2011	Last Scene (ラストシーン)	Tomoyatsu Hotei	All Time Super Guest

=== As Ohashi Trio ===
==== Studio albums ====
Year	Title	JPN Oricon	
Year	Title	Peak	Weeks
2007	Pretaporter	263	2
2008	This Is Music	114	7
2009	A Bird	21	8
2009	I Got Rhythm?	27	6
2010	Newold	29	4
2011	L (エル)	41	4
2011	R (アール)	39	5
2012	White	34	4
2013	Plugged (プラグド)	24	6
2013	Magic	30	3
2015	Parody	30	3
2016	10 (TEN)	13	5
2017	Blue	16	5
2018	Stereo	15	5
2019	Thunderbird	21	5
2020	This Is Music Too	17	5
2021	New World	15	1
2024	Gold Hour	29	
2025	Mono-Poly	27	
2026	A Band	44	

==== Live albums ====
Year	Title	JPN Oricon	
Year	Title	Peak	Weeks
2015	OhashiTrio & The Pretaporters 2014	47	2

==== Cover albums ====
Year	Title	JPN Oricon	
Year	Title	Peak	Weeks
2010	Fake Book	53	4
2011	Fake Book II	74	4
2012	Fake Book III	76	2

==== Compilation albums ====
Year	Title	JPN Oricon	
Year	Title	Peak	Weeks
2014	Ohashi Trio Deluxe Best (大橋トリオ DELUXE BEST)	26	5
2014	Ohashi Trio Standard & Ballad Best (大橋トリオ STANDARD & BALLAD BEST)	26	5
2014	Ohashi Trio Standard Best (大橋トリオ STANDARD BEST)	26	5

==== Singles ====
Year	Title	JPN Oricon		Album
Year	Title	Peak	Weeks	Album
2009	Hadaka no Ōsama (はだかの王様)	—	—	A Bird
2009	Shine	—	—	A Bird
2009	A Bird	—	—	A Bird
2009	Boku to Tsuki no Waltz (僕と月のワルツ)	—	—	I Got Rhythm?
2010	Okurukotoba (贈る言葉, cover)	—	—	Fake Book
2010	Honey	—	—	Newold
2016	Ringo no Ki/Uchu Kara Yattekita ni Nyanbo (りんごの木/宇宙からやってきたにゃんぼー)	59	1	Non-album single
2017	Amy Said	—	—	Non-album single
2017	She	—	—	Stereo
2017	Tori no You Ni (鳥のように)	—	—	Stereo
2018	Natural Woman	—	—	Thunderbird
2018	S・M・I・L・E・S	—	—	Thunderbird
"—" denotes items which failed to chart.

==== Guest appearances ====
Year	Title	Other Artist(s)	Album
2009	Kaze no Tani no Nausicaa (風の谷のナウシカ) (Narumi Yasuda cover)	None	Ghibli meets Bossa Nova (ジブリ meets Bossa Nova)
2010	Mayonaka no Merry-Go-Round ~No Music, No Life~ (真夜中のメリーゴーランド 〜NO MUSIC, NO LIFE〜)	Aoi Teshima	No Music, No Life. Songs
2010	Winnie the Pooh and the Honey Tree (Sherman Brothers cover)	None	Disney Rocks!!
2011	Totsuzen no Okurimono (突然の贈り物) (Taeko Ohnuki cover)	None	Happy Holidays!~City Pops Covers~
2012	Okurukotoba (贈る言葉) (Kaientai cover)	None	Happy Holidays!~80's Pops Covers~
2012	Polly (Nirvana cover)	None	Nevermind Tribute
2013	Fine Thank You and You? (feat. Ohashi Trio)	Shipsenti	10CM
2014	Stay Gold (Hikaru Utada cover)	None	Utada Hikaru no Uta −13 Kumi no Ongakuka ni Yoru 13 no Kaishaku ni Tsuite- (宇多田ヒカルのうた -13組の音楽家による13の解釈について-)
2018	TURN IT UP	MONDO GROSSO	Attune / Detune
2018	Can't Stop	Asako Toki	Safari
2022	(......Le Petit Prince)（……小王子）	Wu Qing-feng	Mallarme's Tuesdays
