= 34th Golden Melody Awards =

Taiwan music awards ceremony in 2023

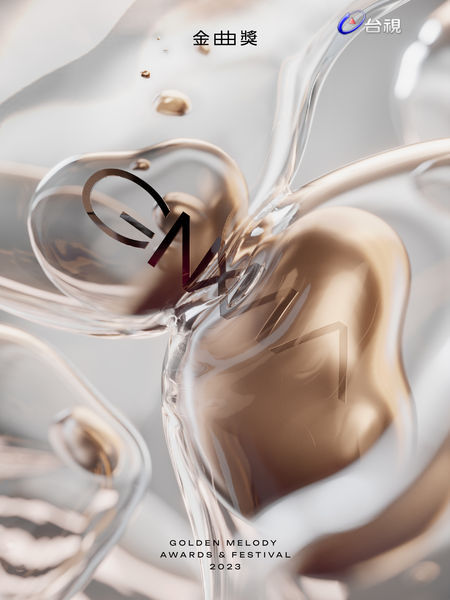
- Date: July 1, 2023 (Popular music)
- Venue: Taipei Arena (Popular music)
- Hosted by: WeiBird
- Most awards: Hung Pei-yu, Enno Cheng, Kasiwa, Deserts Chang (2)
- Most nominations: Hung Pei-yu / Silver Lining (8)
- Website: gma.tavis.tw/gm34/index.htm

Television/radio coverage
- Network: TTV

The 34th Golden Melody Awards (Chinese: 第34屆金曲獎) took place in Taipei Arena, Taipei, Taiwan in 2023. The award ceremony for the popular music categories was hosted by WeiBird and broadcast on TTV on 1 July 2023.

Hung Pei-yu received the most nominations with 8 for her debut album Silver Lining (明室) with Lala Hsu closed behind her on her sixth album Gei, which also got 8 awards.

A-Lin won her first Female Mandarin Singer award after being nominated on the same category for the past 6 awards, while the biggest surprise on Male Mandarin Singer award goes to the first-timer HUSH, where he edges out Qing Feng Wu.

== Winners and Nominees ==
Below are the list of winners and nominees:

Vocal category – Record label awards
Album of the Year	Song of the Year
Mallarme's Tuesdays – Qing Feng Wu; Gei – Lala Hsu; Silver Lining – Pei-Yu Hung; Snow White – JADE; PRO – Kumachan (Xinkuan Xiong); Pleasing Myself – HUSH; Mercury Retrograde – Enno Cheng; Holy Gazai – A_Root; KEH – DJ MR.GIN; Marigold – HAOTING; Pity Zhu An – Cai Qiufeng; Folk Tale – Olivia Tsao; Waiting a present for – Chiu Shu; Yam Fung leu – Rita Lin; Living Room Dreaming – Julia Peng; Snail – Misa; Humble – Boiii P; Together, us – Biung; Watershed – Kivi; The Roots – Matzka; Ita – Kasiwa; ABUS – Abus・Tanapima	"A Flash and How It Lasts" (from 9522) – anpu; "Like A Star" (from Gei) – Lala Hsu; "Silver Lining" (from Silver Lining) – Hung Pei-yu; "Greatest Works of Art" (from Greatest Works of Art) – Jay Chou; "Daughters feat.Chunho (from Mercury Retrograde)" – Enno Cheng; "Semane sepi" (from ITA) – Kasiwa
Best Mandarin Album	Best Taiwanese Album
PRO – Kumachan (Xinkuan Xiong); Gei – Lala Hsu; Silver Lining – Pei-Yu Hung; Snow White – JADE; Mallarme's Tuesdays – Qing Feng Wu; Pleasing Myself – HUSH	Mercury Retrograde – Enno Cheng; Holy Gazai – A_Root; KEH – DJ MR.GIN; Marigold – HAOTING; Pity Zhu An – Cai Qiufeng; Folk Tale – Olivia Tsao
Best Hakka Album	Best Indigenous Language Album
Yam Fung leu – Rita Lin; Waiting a present for – Chiu Shu; Living Room Dreaming – Julia Peng; Snail – Misa; Humble – Boiii P	The Roots – Matzka; Together, us – Biung; Watershed – Kivi; Ita – Kasiwa; ABUS – Abus・Tanapima
Best Music Video	
Little Balcony (from Little Balcony) – Director: Pennacky; Beanstalk (from BEANSTALK) – Director: JYUN CHANG; I Will Find You (from Memorable Moments) – Director: Peifu Chen; Gei (from Gei) – Director: BILL+; in peace (from healism) – Director: Almost (from Snow White) – Director: Birdy Nio; ...... Siren Salon (from Mellarme's Tuesdays) – Director: Show Yanagisawa	
Vocal category – Individual awards
Best Composition	Best Lyrics
"Anything But" (from Silver Lining) – Lala Hsu (Performer: Pei-Yu Hung); "Nomadland" (from Nomadland) – Zooey Wonder (Performer: Zooey Wonder); "Blame" (from LINK) – Eve Ai (Performer: A-LIN); "Daughters (feat.Chunho) – Enno Cheng and Chunho (Performer: Enno Cheng); "Farce" (from The Passive Audience) – Penny Tai (Performer: Penny Tai); "......Fragments d'un Discours Amoureux (Feat.Karena Lam)" (from Mellarme's Tuesdays) – Qing Feng Wu (Performer: Qing Feng Wu and Karena Lam)	"Homo Sapiens" (from Homo Sapiens) – Chow Yiu Fai (Performer: Eason Chan); "Heading North" (from Take It Slow, I Will Be There) – Skippy (Performer: Crispy); "Anything But" (from Silver Lining) – David Ke (Performer: Pei-Yu Hung); "NFT" (from Mr. Yao's 8th Grade Syndrome) – MC Hot Dog (Performer: MC Hot Dog); "How the brain got language? feat.Chunho" (from Mecury Retrograde) – Enno Cheng (Performer: Enno Cheng); "Regression" (from MEMENTO) – Lin Xi (Performer: Terence Lam)
Best Music Arrangement	Producer of the Year, Album
"Kungkung Workbook" (from 9522) – Chico Tsai (Performer: anpu); "Bearish" (from Snow White) – Kyle Lu (Performer: JADE); "Witches" (from Dreams) – Elephant Gym (KT Chang, Chia-Chin Tu, Tell Chang) (Performer: Elephant Gym); "Good Afternoon, Good Evening and Goodnight" (from Good Afternoon, Good Evening and Goodnight) – Owen Wang (Performer: WeiBird); "Bondage" (from Discipline) – Jason Choi (Performer: Sandee Chen); "......The Great Hypnotist" (from Mellarme's Tuesdays) – Qing Feng Wu, Howe Chen (Performer: Qing Feng Wu)	Holy Gazai – Blaire Ko (Performer: A_Root); Gei – LaLa Hsu, Howe Chen (Performer: LaLa Hsu); Silver Lining – George Chen (Performer: Pei-Yu Hung); REVELATION – G.E.M, GONG (Performer: G.E.M); Déjà Fu – LÜCY (Performer: LÜCY); Mellarme's Tuesdays – Qing Feng Wu, Howe Chen (Performer: Qing Feng Wu)
Producer of the Year, Single	Best New Artist
"Telephone" (from Snow White) – Kyle Lu, Itun Chou (Performer: JADE); "Nomadland" (from Nomadland) – Howe Chen (Performer: Zooey Wonder); "Henshin" (from Tshut Tsit Ki Tshui) – Chen Chien-Wei (Performer: Shao Da-Lun); "Shadow" (from Dreams) – HLK／ (Performer: Elephant Gym and 9m88); "Bi Li Ka Li Hai" (from Bi Li Ka Li Hai) – NICKTHEREAL, Jae Chong (Performer: Billie Wang); "Fashion !" (from Fashion !) – LimGiong, ChihSiou, Yu (Performer: ChihSiou); "Tina's Hausu" (from Tina's Hausu) – Joanna Wang, Adam Lee (Performer: Joanna Wang)	Silver Lining – Pei-Yu Hung; Shin Formosa Youth? – Mango Jump; LÜCY – LÜCY; Marigold – HAOTING; Talent – The Crane; CZ Dogg – CZ Dogg; Abus – Abus・Tanapima
Best Male Mandarin Singer	Best Female Mandarin Singer
Pleasing Myself – HUSH; Mr. Yao's 8th Grade Syndrome – MC Hot Dog; PRO – Kumachan; Melarme's Tuesdays – Qing Feng Wu; Talent – The Crane; Teen on Shuqian Street – Zhao Lei	LINK – A-LIN; Gei – Lala Hsu; Silver Lining – Hung Pei-yu; Dear Life – Yisa Yu; A Passive Audience – Penny Tai; The Happy Star – Lexie Liu
Best Male Singer (Taiwanese)	Best Female Singer (Taiwanese)
Thank You My Love – A Ge La; Tshut Tsi̍t Ki Tshuì – Shao Da-Lun; INTO – Sam Liao; Extends – Bamboo Chen; Since Chou – Since Chou	Mecury Retrograde – Enno Cheng; No Hindrance – Kelly Tsai; Think of Someone – Fei Huang; Pity Zhu An – Cai Qiufeng; Folk Tale – Olivia Tsao
Best Singer (Indigenous Language)	Best Singer (Hakka)
Ita – Kasiwa; Together, Us – Biung; The Vine – Yaway·Mawring; Watershed – Kivi; The Roots – Matza; ABUS – Abus・Tanapima	Living Room Dreaming – Julia Peng; Yam Fung Ieu – Rita Lin; Hakka Kafka – Huang Zixuan; Snail – Misa; Go Mode – VUIZE
Best Band	Best Vocal Group
The Moment – Cosmos People; Kafka on the Rivers-and-Lakes– Sheng Xiang & Band; Understory – Bugs of Phonon; Snow White – JADE; Dreams – Elephant Gym; Holy Gazai – A_Root; SYSTEM BOOTING – Robot Swing	Take It Slow, I Will Be There – Crispy; Our Adventure Begins – Running Youth; Backfire – Deepwhite2; BROMAN – Nine One One; Bedside Fudge – Mr.Miss
Instrumental category – Record label awards
Best Instrumental Album	
Connected – Chien Chien Lu and Richie Goods; I Prefer – S'yo Fang, Priscilla Nokoe, Yoojin Ko, Alessio Bruno, Richie Struck and Emilio Parrilla; CHÁO – Rich Huang; Sunset In The Alps – Baby-C and Yannick Barman; Sunrise – Teriver Cheung and So To Chit	
Instrumental category – Individual awards
Best Instrumental Album Producer	Best Instrumental Composer
Sunset in the Alps – Baby-C, Yannick Barman; I Prefer – S'yo Fang; CHÁO – Rich Huang, Baby-C; Connected – Richie Goods; tsiánn – Ohtake Ken	"Auntie in the Market" (from CHÁO) – Baby-C, Rich Huang; "Waves" (from CHÁO) – Baby-C; "Breaking the Circle" (from I'll See You in the Fog) – Tony Li; "Sunset In The Alps" (from Sunset In The Alps) – Baby-C, Yannick Barman; "Herniated Intervertebral Disc" (from Szu Chien Lu) – Szu-Chien Lu
Technical category – Individual awards
Best Album Design	
Discipline – Hitsu Pi; Kafka on the Rivers-and-Lakes – Wu Chia Lin; EARTHBOUND – FK WU, Hitsu Pi, HUNG JUI CHIA; Echoes Of All The Flowers – Joe Fang、Pei-Cen, Guo; Together, us – Andrew Wong、Karen Tsai	
Technical category – Record label awards
Best Album Recording	Best Instrumental Album Recording
Time's up – (Recording Engineers：Chou Han Tsay／Main Mixing Engineers：Chou Han Tsay／Main Mastering Post-Production：John Greenham); Nomadland – (Recording Engineers：Yu Hsuan Yeh, HLK, Link Shan, Zen Chien, AJ Chen, ioui, Chief Wang, Lin Shang-Po, Chou Han Tsay, SHENB／Main Mixing Engineers：cts, ioui, Ziya Huang, Howe Chen, Link Shan, Jerry Lin／Main Mastering Post-Production：Mike Bozzi, Cass Irvine); Gei – (Recording Engineers：Micky Yang, Zen Chien, Min-Hsiang Chang, YuHsuan Yeh, SHENB, Hendrik Pan, Lin Shang-Po, LaLa Hsu, Chou Han Tsay／Main Mixing Engineers：Ziya Huang, Howe Chen／Main Mastering Post-Production：Randy Merrill); Get My Way Up – (Recording Engineers：Attis, Thomas Chuang, Leo Chou, Levii, Joshua Lee／Main Mixing Engineers：Leo Chou, LuuX, Chou Han Tsay, Thomas Chuang, Itun Chou, Link Shan／Main Mastering Post-Production：Sabrina Lo, Marcus Tsao, Jeff Lipton, Maria Rice); The Roots – (Recording Engineers：Fengtse, BonBon Chen／Main Mixing Engineers：Matthew Sim／Main Mastering Post-Production：Peter Hewitt-Dutton)	SEDAR Trio - Vol. 1–(Recording Engineers：Li You, Li Yang／Main Mixing Engineers：Kevin Killen／Main Mastering Post-Production：Bob Ludwig); CHÁO – (Recording Engineers：David Wang, Shao-Ting Sun／Main Mixing Engineers：Baby-C, Shao-Ting Sun／Main Mastering Post-Production：Shao-Ting Sun); Hakudou – (Recording Engineers：Yang Li, Andy Baker／Main Mixing Engineers：David Darlington／Main Mastering Post-Production：David Darlington); Szu Chien Lu – (Zen Chien, Chou-Han Tsay, Joshua Lee, Link Shan, BonBon Chen, Szu-Chien Lu／Main Mixing Engineers：Joshua Lee, Zen Chien, Jay Cheng, Itun Chou, Sam Wu, J-Jyun Ciou, Troy Lin, Rose Liang／Main Mastering Post-Production：John Davis); For Papa Shawna Yang Quartet Live at Yilan – (Recording Engineers：Kao Min Fu／Main Mixing Engineers：Dave Darlington／Main Mastering Post-Production：Dave Darlington)
Special Contribution Award
Eric Lin	Ouyang Fei Fei
Jury Award
Ita – Kasiwa
