= L'Après-midi d'un faune (EP) =

EP by Wu Qing-feng
- Released: July 22, 2022
- Genre: Mandopop
- Length: 15:27
- Label: Universal Music Taiwan
- Producer: Wu Qing-Feng、Magnus Skylstad、Robin Guthrie

L'Après-midi d'un faune is Taiwanese singer Qing-Feng Wu’s third EP, which was released digitally on July 22, 2022. Conceived as an "international trilogy", the EP includes 4 songs co-produced with overseas musicians, including Norwegian singer Aurora, American singer-songwriter Rufus Wainwright and Scottish musician Robin Guthrie, known for his band Cocteau Twins. This was Qing-Feng's first attempt at transnational cooperation and global distribution. The EP title comes from the poem of the same name by the 19th-century French poet Stéphane Mallarmé. This EP is also the intro to Qing-Feng Wu's third solo album Mallarme's Tuesdays and was released as a limited physical EP to be the gift for the pre-order of Mallarme's Tuesdays.

== Background ==
After finishing 16 Leaves Concert in 2020, Qing-Feng Wu composed several new melodies. Feeling downhearted, he wasn’t able to complete the lyrics and put them on hold for nearly two years. During this period, his partners of the music company suggested that he should collaborate with overseas artists for a change emotionally. The advice opened up a series of upcoming opportunities for international co-creation.

After finishing the third song of the EP, "The Egg of Columbus", Qing-Feng Wu heard a voice in his dream, telling him to write down the lyrics of a certain song that had been brewing for a long time. Waking up, he completed the lyrics (as the lyrics of “(......The Great Hypnotist)” in Mallarme's Tuesdays). Like the clouds finally broke apart, Qing-Feng Wu eventually finished the rest of eleven songs in Mallarme's Tuesdays.

Due to the above process of creation, the EP L'Après-midi d'un faune was positioned as the "prelude" to the album Mallarme's Tuesdays during the stage of developing subsequent planning concepts and release plans. The EP is not only an independent and international co-creation, but also the intro that has to be listened together with the album Mallarme's Tuesdays, for the two works are contextually related and echoing each other. Qing-Feng Wu said, "The development of songwriting represents the development of state of mind, which is why this EP is a 'prelude', an 'invitation letter'."

=== Concept and production ===
Mallarme's poem L'Après-midi d'un faune depicts Faun, the ancient Roman rustic god of forest, plains and field, who has just woken up from his afternoon nap and discusses his encounters with several nymphes during the morning in a dreamlike monologue. For Qing-Feng Wu, this EP is a journey of musical encounters between the singer and the three dream musicians in his heart. Through this EP, Qing-Feng Wu invites the audience to walk into a music salon hosted by him.

== Track listing ==
No.	Title	Lyrics	Music	Length
1.	"Storm"	Aurora Aksnes, Magnus Skylstad, Glen Roberts, Qing-feng Wu, Mei Yeh（葉玫君）	Aurora Aksnes, Magnus Skylstad, Glen Roberts, Qing-feng Wu, Howe Chen（陳君豪）	3:47
2.	"A Wanderer In The Sleep City"	Rufus Wainwright, Qing-feng Wu	Rufus Wainwright, Qing-feng Wu	4:10
3.	"The Egg of Columbus" (哥倫布的蛋)	Qing-feng Wu	Robin Guthrie, Qing-feng Wu	3:41
4.	"Storm (English Version)"	Aurora Aksnes, Magnus Skylstad, Glen Roberts, Qing-feng Wu, Mei Yeh	Aurora Aksnes, Magnus Skylstad, Glen Roberts, Qing-feng Wu, Howe Chen	3:49
Total length:				15:27

== Background of collected tracks ==
01 “Storm” (with Aurora)

Aside from featuring Aurora, the song’s lyrics and melody are also jointly created by the two artists. According to Qing-Feng Wu, the lyrics of this song reflect his current state of mind: he is still unable to face the happy melody, and is waiting for a storm to take him away from the earth.

02 “A Wanderer In The Sleeping City” (feat. Rufus Wainwright)

Seldom co-creating and collaborating with other artists, Rufus Wainwright invited Qing-Feng Wu to create and sing an English single together right after receiving his demo. Wainwright co-composed the melody based on Wu's creation, and the English lyrics were developed from Qing-Feng’s initial ideas. Qing-Feng's original demo was based on the theme of "sadness outside the door". However, the lyrics written by Rufus Wainwright had it transformed slightly: Wainwright opened the door in the house, taking sorrowful Qing-Feng Wu to wander in the air and overlook the city from the mountains. Next, they found another Qing-Feng in the city, waiting to be awakened by Qing-Feng himself.

03 “The Egg of Columbus” (feat. Robin Guthrie)

This song compares creation to an adventure and a grand tour, and uses the navigator and explorer Columbus in the Age of Discovery as a metaphor to elaborate the process of finding an exit in creation for an author. After receiving the melody composed by Robin Guthrie, Qing-Feng Wu, again, found it difficult for him to respond to the bright and cheerful melody and thus the lyrics of this song weren’t completed until 10 months after.

== Music videos ==
Title	Director	Premiere Date
Storm (with Aurora)	Sigurd Fossen	June 20, 2022
Storm (English Version) (with Aurora)	Sigurd Fossen	June 20, 2022
A Wanderer In The Sleeping City (feat. Rufus Wainwright)	Born Li (李伯恩)	September 18, 2022
The Egg of Columbus (feat. Robin Guthrie)	April Lee (李依純)	October 27, 2022
