= Kasiwa (singer) =

Taiwanese rapper and singer

- Born: Huang Ko Hsiung; Laiyi, Pingtung, Taiwan
- Occupations: Rapper; singer; songwriter
- Musical career
- Genres: C-pop; hip hop
- Instrument: Vocal
- Label: Universal Music Taiwan

Huang Ko Hsiung (Chinese: 黃克雄), known professionally as Kasiwa (Chinese: 葛西瓦) is a Taiwanese rapper, singer and songwriter. He is the lead singer of the band Boxing and is also a solo artist.

== Early life ==
Along with his brother Jaljan, Kasiwa was born in the village of Wenle in Laiyi, Pingtung, in an ethnic Paiwan family.

== Career ==
In 2010, Kasiwa, Jaljan and their cousins Lawa and Kuljelje formed the band Boxing in 2010. Two years later, they were discovered by A-mei, in which they were the only band to perform at nine shows at her AMeiZING World Tour. The band has released three studio albums, including the Paiwan language album Wild Boxing and their Chinese language self-titled album. With these two albums, Boxing received multiple nominations at the 26th Golden Melody Awards, winning Best New Artist with their self-titled album. Kasiwa also made a cameo appearance in the 2016 film Hang in There, Kids! alongside his Boxing bandmates.

In November 2018, Kasiwa released his first solo single in his native language, "Maya Maluqem Don't Back Down." In 2023, he won the Best Indigenous Language Singer Award and the Jury Award at the 34th Golden Melody Awards for his debut solo album, "I Have a Batch of Very Pure Ita, Do You Want Ita?".
