= Spaceman (Qing-Feng Wu album) =

Studio album by Wu Qing-feng
- Released: September 6, 2019
- Genre: Mandopop
- Length: 56:09
- Label: Universal Music Taiwan
- Producer: Qing-Feng Wu, Showy Hsu

Wu Qing-feng chronology
Peeping/When I am Missing You (2019)	Spaceman (2019)	Folio Vol.1：One and One (2020)

Spaceman (太空人, Tài Kōng Rén) is Taiwanese singer-songwriter Qing-Feng Wu's debut solo studio album, co-produced by Qing-Feng Wu and Showy Hsu, released officially on September 6, 2019, containing twelve songs. The overall production of the album follows the core concept of “communication/ dis-communication" that is well resonated with the contents of the lyrics, music, packaging, music videos, marketing campaign and the following concert. Before Spaceman was officially released, it already made 70 thousand pre-order sales. After the album was released officially, it was successively ranked the best-selling album of the year in Taiwan's album sales charts.

== Background ==
Spaceman is the debut solo studio album released by Qing-Feng Wu after Sodagreen disbanded for 2 years. Qing-Feng Wu intentionally took a break from creating any music from 2016 to 2017. He didn't start to write any songs until the beginning of 2018, and he has also started to learn music arrangement since then. As Qing-Feng Wu organized his old works while creating the new ones, he gradually came up with the entire concept of the album. Spaceman collects twelve songs; six of them are his recent works and the earliest work traces back to 2002. The collected pieces are all inspired by Qing-Feng Wu's life experience; many of them were written due to his realization of the darkness in the human nature.

== Production ==
=== Concept and Composition ===
The background narrative of the album is "the illusionary world in the mind's eye of a spaceman". Qing-Feng noted "The image of the hero of the album I have in my mind is a man lying in sickbed, seemingly unconscious, as no one can tell whether a paralyzed man like him really has another world inside of his head and whether or not he himself knows that he isn't awake at all." The themes of the songs present several contrastive pairs referring to "communication and responses", "consciousness and memories", "self and others", "dreams and awakeness", "sanity and insanity" and "illusion and reality". The 12 songs resemble 12 chapters that are well coherent, but each of them also stands for an independent piece, while remaining an exquisite narrative as a whole.

=== Visual Concept and Album Packaging Design ===
Qing-Feng Wu had examined the concept of paradox and ambiguity greatly in his lyrics, which inspired the designer to translate the conception into the album packaging to imply that the audience have to juxtapose the design back and forth to figure out the true and the false. Malaysian photographer Lin Zhong and stylist Yii Ooi, through the theatrical arrangement of the images, collaborated to bring out two sides of the singer - sometimes crazy and bizarre and sometimes childlike.

=== Music Production ===
The music arrangement of the works collected in Spaceman contains elements of electronic, psychedelic, theatrical, world music, folk, rock, post-rock, avant-garde, classical, R&B, Hip Pop and so on.

=== Background of collected tracks ===
“The Carnival in Babel” (巴別塔慶典, Bā Bié Tǎ Qìng Diǎn) discusses the Biblical story of the Tower of Babel that explains the origins of the multiplicity of languages which led to all sorts of disputes while satirizing the miscommunication among people in a humorous manner. The title track “Spaceman” (太空人, Tài Kōng Rén) depicts the sentiments that may be "unremarkable to the casual eye, but unforgettable in some people's mind", as the song was inspired by an ambiguous relationship the singer once had in the past. The music is arranged with simple guitar chords to bring up the ordinary texture of life. Qing-Feng Wu said that the lyrics of this very song are his favorite among all the lyrics he has written so far.

“Influenza” (傷風, Shāng Fēng) talks about the phenomenon "when people hurting each other has become common practice". The term “傷風”, generally known as "cold", can be interpreted as "Po Shang Feng” (破傷風, Tetanus) as well as the abbreviation of the idiom “傷風敗俗” (shāng fēng bài sú, morally corrupt). From a first-person narrative, with the style of magic realism, “The Forgotten Town” (失憶鎮, Shī Yì Zhèn) depicts the state of consciousness of amnesia (失憶症 Shī Yì Zhèng, pronounced almost the same as the song title “失憶鎮” in Chinese), insanity and nonsensical babbling. The audio mixing presents the multi-track mixed vocal that drifts back and forth, far and close, creating a sense of temporal and spatial isolation and an impression of displacement. “Story~lines” (線的記憶, Xiàn De Jì Yì) adopts the relevant concept and terminology of "lines" in Geometry to portray the emotional condition of human beings, from existing in isolation to gradually bonding with others.

“Outsider”, about 10 minutes and a half long, is the final chapter of "Autobiography of A Madman". Producer Showy Hsu (徐千秀) added a 4-minute long, post-rock instrumental piece when he was arranging the music. Qing-Feng Wu was therefore inspired to write a monologue to go with it, and also had it serve as the annotation of the entire album.“The Echo Collector” (回音收集員, Huí Yīn Shōu Jí Yuán) is only instrumentalized with drums, Marimba and the layered vocal. The vocal shifts between left and right channel to imitate the echo effect auditorily. The word choice of the lyrics comes from the other 11 songs; structurally, if “Dream Translator”(譯夢機, Yì Mèng Jī) is the "Prologue" of the album, “The Echo Collector” would be the "Table of Contents". “The Echo Collector” depicts that "the present moment" of every individual is interwoven and accumulated by countless echoes in the past, as "echoes" refer to the words, allusions and messages that come from families, schools and societies. Qing-Feng Wu once noted that the song also speaks for his opinion about work creation; in other others, no creation is a purely original invention of one's self.

== Critical reception ==
Spaceman has received mainly positive reviews. By August 12, 2020, Spaceman received User Rating of 8.1 (reviewed by 2,016 users) and 8.0 (reviewed by 9,908 users) on Douban Music (豆瓣音樂).

The host Momoko from Hit FM (radio station in Taiwan) gave recognition to the album, noting that Spaceman shows a different side of Qing-Feng Wu; aside from enjoying music of various genres, audience can also sense the diversity in Qing-Feng's vocal. The Beijing News (新京報) praised the album for being well executed and delicate in details.

== Track listing ==
All tracks are written by Qing-Feng Wu (Except for "Story~lines" and "Outsider", the composer is Kay Liu)） Producers of the album: Qing-Feng Wu and Showy Hsu.

No.	Title	Length
1.	"譯夢機" (Dream Translator)	7:23
2.	"回音收集員" (The Echo Collector)	3:48
3.	"巴別塔慶典" (The Carnival in Babel)	3:29
4.	"太空人" (Spaceman)	5:18
5.	"傷風" (Influenza)	3:55
6.	"失憶鎮" (The Forgotten Town)	3:51
7.	"太空" (Space)	3:46
8.	"水仙花之死" (Death of Narcissus)	3:47
9.	"男孩莊周" (Boy Zhuangzi)	3:26
10.	"太空船" (Spaceship)	3:06
11.	"線的記憶" (Story~lines)	4:02
12.	"Outsider"	10:18
Total length:		56:09

== Music videos ==
Every song in the album has its own music video that was released on YouTube in the form of “The Project of Spaceman Film Festival" (太空人影展計畫, Tài Kōng Rén Yǐng Zhǎn Jì Huà) . The contents of the 12 videos resonate and connect with one another. The imageries and objects displayed in the end of each video serve as the opening of the following video; the 12 pieces therefore are connected together to create a cycle to be in consistent with the track arrangement as the beginning track echoes the ending one.

Title	Director	Premier Date	Description
The Carnival in Babel (巴別塔慶典)	Wonmo Seong (DIGIPEDI)	July 10, 2019	
Space (太空)	Shih-Ting Hung (洪詩婷)	August 10, 2019	
Spaceman (太空人)	Muh Chen (陳奕仁)	September 13, 2019	Starring: Janine Chang (張鈞甯) and Austin Lin (林柏宏).
Story~lines (線的記憶)	Jude Chen (陳映之)	October 18, 2019	
The Forgotten Town (失憶鎮)	Shockley Huang (黃中平)	November 1, 2019	Motion control photography was applied by the director.; Location shooting.
Spaceship (太空船)	Masashi Kawamura (川村真司)	January 18, 2020	Collaborated with Japanese director Masashi Kawamura and Japanese illustrator Hiroshi Abe (阿部弘士).
Dream Translator (譯夢機)	Smoky Tu (涂皓欽)	April 1, 2020	
The Echo Collector回音收集員	Smoky Tu (涂皓欽)	April 1, 2020	
Death of Narcissus水仙花之死	Tsung-Fan TAN (談宗藩)	April 15, 2020	Style Director: Sandee Chan (陳珊妮).
Boy Zhuangzi (男孩莊周)	Tsung-Fan TAN (談宗藩)	April 15, 2020	A co-creation project, collecting video materials through Instagram filters from the fans, co-created the content of the music video. Nearly 80 thousand videos were received for the project.
Influenza (傷風)	Philip Yung (翁子光)	May 15, 2020	Special Starring: Ke-Xi Wu (吳可熙).
Outsider	Jude Chen (陳映之)	May 15, 2020	Special Starring: Kay Liu (劉家凱), Austin Lin (林柏宏), Janine Chang (張鈞甯) and Hisu-Fu Liu (劉修甫).; Filmed with infrared photography to construct the lightness in the deep sea to present a greater sense of darkness in the illusionary world.; The fish installation was the work of the artist Yu-Sheng Li (李育昇).

== Charts ==
Also see Wikipedia entry "2019 The Best-Selling Albums of The Year" under "List of Best-Selling Albums in Taiwan"

Chart	Date	Rank	Details
Five Music Top Ranking (Mandarin category) (五大年度華語金榜)	2019	#1	Spaceman, the pre-ordered edition (note: In the first week of the official release of the album, the sales per share of Spaceman was 88% at Five Music, the highest record since 2004.)
The Best-Selling Album of the Year - Chia Chia Record (佳佳唱片 年度銷售排行榜)	2019	#1	Spaceman, the pre-ordered edition
The Best-Selling Mandarin Album of the Year - Kuang Nan Fashion Shop (光南 年度熱銷 華語排行榜)	2019	#5	Spaceman (note: all editions)
The Best-Selling Album of The Month - Books.com.tw (博客來 每月暢銷排行)	2019	#1	Spaceman, the pre-ordered edition.
The Best-Selling Album of The Month - Books.com.tw (博客來 每月暢銷排行)	2019	#3	Spaceman, the official edition. (note: The album rank remained top 30 from October 2019 to March 2020.)
The Best-Selling Album of The Month - Books.com.tw (博客來 每月暢銷排行)	2019	#1	Spaceman (note: all editions)
The Best-Selling Album of The Month - Books.com.tw (博客來 每月暢銷排行)	May 2019	#5	Spaceman 2LPs
Eslite Music TOP100 of The Year (誠品音樂 年度推薦榜 TOP100)	2019	#1	Spaceman (note: all editions)

Weekly chart (2019)	Peak position	Source
Five Music Top Ranking (Mandarin category) 台灣華語榜（5大金榜）	1	

== Awards and nominations ==
年份	獎項名稱	提名獎項	提名作品	頒獎結果
2019	Hit FM	Hit FM Top 10 Albums of The Year	Spaceman(Album)	Won
2019	QQ Music Year-End Chart	Top 10 Mandarin Album	Spaceman(Album)	Won
2020	HITO Music Awards	HITO Top 10 Chinese Songs of The Year	Spaceman(single)	Won
2020	HITO Music Awards	HITO Best Composer	Boy Zhuangzi	Won
2020	HITO Music Awards	Hit Fm Singer of The Year	Spaceman(Album)	Won
2020	HITO Music Awards	HITO Best Male Singer	Spaceman(Album)	Won
2020	The 31st Golden Melody Award	Best Male Mandarin Singer	Spaceman(Album)	Nominated
2020	The 31st Golden Melody Award	Best Mandarin Album	Spaceman(Album)	Nominated
2020	The 31st Golden Melody Award	The Best Composer	Spaceman(Album)	Won
2020	The 31st Golden Melody Award	Album of the Year	Spaceman(single)	Nominated
2020	The 13th Freshmusic Awards	Best Male Mandarin Singer	Spaceman(Album)	Won
2020	The 13th Freshmusic Awards	Top 10 Albums of The Year	Spaceman(Album)	Won
2020	The 13th Freshmusic Awards	Top 10 Singles of The Year	Death of Narcissus	Won
2020	The Telly Awards 2020	Television General-Music Video / Gold Telly Winner	Spaceman Music Video	Won
2020	The Telly Awards 2020	Television Craft-Directing / Gold Telly Winner	Spaceman Music Video	Won
