= Mallarme's Tuesdays =

Studio album by Wu Qing-feng
- Released: September 30, 2022
- Genre: Mandopop
- Length: 43:59
- Label: Universal Music Taiwan

Wu Qing-feng chronology
Folio Vol.1: One and One (2020)	Mallarme's Tuesdays (2022)

Mallarme's Tuesdays (Chinese: 馬拉美的星期二) is the third studio album by Taiwanese singer-songwriter Wu Qing-feng. Produced by Qing-Feng Wu and Howe Chen (陳君豪), the album was officially released on September 30, 2022. It collects 12 songs and had domestic and oversea musicians from different fields invited to participate in the production of each song, including singers Stefanie Sun, Lisa Ono, ohashiTrio, Les Petits Chanteurs de Saint-Marc and pianist Chun-Chieh Yen. The title of the album is inspired by the Tuesday evening salons hosted by French poet Stéphane Mallarmé. Released earlier in July, the EP L'Après midi d'un faune (牧神的午後), also named after a poem written by Stéphane Mallarmé, is the intro to the album.

== Background ==
=== Production ===
Taking Qing-Feng Wu two years to produce, Mallarme's Tuesdays (馬拉美的星期二) is so far the most time-consuming work of his. The collected songs were mostly inspired when he was between awake and asleep in 2020. Although all of the songs were already completed at that time, Qing-Feng Wu didn’t find himself emotionally and circumstantially ready to write the lyrics for these bright-toned pieces. To make sure that he was true to himself when creating the lyrics, he waited for two more years. In early 2022, after completing 3 songs for the EP L'Après midi d'un faune (牧神的午後), one specific dream made him realize that he could carry on the unfinished task:

“ In my dream, a shadow, sometimes shaped, sometimes formless, kicked me and said ‘You shall write now’. I woke up with a start. The lyrics started to flow gradually like some cork was pulled out. “

Waking up, Qing-Feng Wu started to write down the lyrics of “(......The Great Hypnotist)” and the other 11 lyrics began to form piece by piece.

=== Concept and production ===
The theme of the album surrounds “the relationship between singers and creation”. As a singer-songwriter, Qing-Feng Wu values “creation” as the most personal thing in his life. The album is therefore a “creation exploring ‘creation’”

The title of the album is inspired by Stéphane Mallarmé whose Tuesday salons hosted at his home were highly distinguished in the French cultural circle. In light of this, Qing-Feng has applied the concept of “salons” to his music creation.

In terms of content, the 12 songs of the album respectively depicts certain aspects of creation, such as consciousness and subconsciousness, loss and awakening, understanding and encountering, alchemy and experimentation, exploration of real names and traumas, accepting differences and the courage to be different...etc.. In terms of form, Qing-Feng Wu images the album as a salon that gathers 12 musicians as the guests to stimulate and encourage each other to give the music works a brand new look. The intro EP L'Après midi d'un faune (牧神的午後) is also named after the title Stéphane Mallarmé’s poem which happened to inspire Claud Debussy to compose Prélude à L'après-midi d'un Faune.

All of the works were born when Qing-Feng was between awake and asleep. The arrangement of the songs embarks on “(......The Little Shepherd)”(......小小牧羊人) as its theme is about consciousness, and ends in “(......Sleeping Beauty)”(......睡美人) that describes the state of unconsciousness.

The song titles are presented in brackets and abridged numbers, which is Qing-Feng Wu’s reference to a certain set of Debussy's songs, suggesting that the audience's feelings about the work can return to their intuitive understanding. The song titles are merely for references, and the relationship between the titles and the works is open and never absolute.

== Track listing ==
All tracks are written by Qing-Feng Wu
All tracks are produced by Qing-Feng Wu and Howe Chen (Except for Track 11 “(......Le Petit Prince)” is produced by ohashiTrio). .

No.	Title	Arrangement	Length
1.	"（……The Little Shepherd）" (feat. The Gleam Ensemble 微光古樂集)	Qing-Feng Wu	3:48
2.	"（……Siren Salon）" (feat. Beni Ninagawa of WagakkiBand 蜷川べに of 和楽器バンド)	Qing-Feng Wu, Howe Chen (陳君豪)	3:24
3.	"（……The Great Hypnotist）" (feat. Maîtrise Saint-Marc - Les Choristes)	Qing-Feng Wu, Howe Chen (陳君豪)	2:44
4.	"（……Fragments d'un Discours Amoureux）" (feat. Karena Lam 林嘉欣)	Qing-Feng Wu	3:44
5.	"（……Spirited Away）" (feat. Yoshiaki Sato 佐藤芳明)	Dato Chang (張晁毓), Qing-Feng Wu	2:52
6.	"（……Doctor Headstrong）" (feat. Dr. Jean-Loup Ringot)	Qing-Feng Wu	2:23
7.	"（……When the Ghost Got Lost）" (feat. Yoed Nir)	Qing-Feng Wu	4:05
8.	"（……Drunkard Ah Q）" (feat. Stefanie Sun 孫燕姿)	Qing-Feng Wu, Howe Chen (陳君豪)	3:36
9.	"（……Brown Haired Girl）" (feat. Lisa Ono 小野リサ)	Qing-Feng Wu	3:39
10.	"（……Dance of the Gnomes）" (feat. Jasmine Sokko 楚晴)	Jasmine Sokko (楚晴), Qing-Feng Wu and Howe Chen (陳君豪)	3:32
11.	"（……Le Petit Prince）" (feat. OhashiTrio 大橋トリオ)	ohashiTrio (大橋トリオ)	4:48
12.	"（……Sleeping Beauty）" (feat. Chun-Chieh Yen 嚴俊傑)	Qing-Feng Wu	5:17
Total length:			43:59

== Background of collected tracks ==
1. “(......The Little Shepherd)”（......小小牧羊人）
  The flock of sheep and the shepherd are used in the lyrics to compare the erratically changing consciousness and the process of self-exploration in it. Echoing the situation of the lyrics, the music arrangement is specially incorporated with the sounds of various ancient instruments such as the medieval recorder and the Baroque violin to present an olden ambience of ancient mythology. When arranging the tracks, Qing-Feng Wu confidently selected this song as the opening. The imagery of the lyrics and the arranged melody of the reed pipe are closely connected with the intro EP L'Après midi d'un faune. This song is also the very work that Wu reckons "most resembles himself" in the album.
2. “(......Siren Salon)” （......海妖沙龍）
  This song presents how free will responds to the diverse opinions of the outside world. The imagery of the ocean is not only the subconscious mind, but also the world in which human beings dwell every day. The wrecked ship, surrounded by the Siren’s voice, sailing across the sea, reminds people of the self that stands alarmingly amid the demands, expectations and criticism of the outside world. The music arrangement includes the sound of the shamisen. Qing-Feng Wu once said: "Unlike the mesmerizing and dangerous Sirens, shamisen is relatively similar to Orpheus, one of the few mythological characters who can subdue the Sirens, braving the wind and waves with musical notes on the bow of the ship contentedly."
3. “(......The Great Hypnotist)”（......催眠大師）
  The lyrics, dialogistic and almost allegorical, describe the state of manipulating, being manipulated and breaking away from manipulation, the process from blindness and loss to awakening and personal autonomy. The segment of the lyrics was initially formed in Qing-Feng Wu’s dream. Although the concept of the lyrics was rather complete, the lyrics weren’t finished as Qing-Feng wasn’t emotionally ready for it. After the EP L'Après midi d'un faune was done, the day before heading to Lyon, France to collaborate with Les Petits Chanteurs de Saint-Marc on this song, Qing-Feng heard a voice in his dream saying, "You should write them down." and the lyrics were therefore completed officially after the singer woke up.
4. “(......Fragments d’un Discours Amoureux)”（......戀人絮語）
  The song uses "attachment" and "companionship" to suggest the close relationship between creation and the singer, and also brings out that "love" is the most original force for creation and expression. The French narration at the prelude and the end of the song are excerpted from The Little Prince recited by actress Karena Lam. The selected lines are all taken from the dialogues of Rose in the original work. The lines in the song are deliberately narrated in a reverse chronology order (reversing the plot order of the original work) to alter the slightly sad ending in the original work, as if The little prince and Rose returned to the moment when they first met each other.
5. “(......Spirited Away)” （......千與千尋）
  The theme of the song is inspired by the protagonist "Chihiro" and her adventures in Hayao Miyazaki's classic work Spirited Away. From Chihiro’s psychological process of finding her real name and identifying herself, the lyrics bring out the close relationship between creation and "self-exploration".
6. “(......Doctor Headstrong)”（......老頑固博士）
  The song uses the scene of ancient alchemy experiment and the instructional lyrics to describe the crucial process of creation: groping forward through observation, trial and error and scrutiny. As to music arrangement, Dr. Jean-Loup Ringot, an archaeologist who teaches at a university in Germany and academically specializes in prehistoric music, was invited to play the prehistoric instrument Lithophone.
7. “(......When the Ghost Got Lost)” （......當幽靈失靈）
  The theme of the song is related to the state of people as they face memories. For Qing-Feng, writing, in general, begins at dealing with his own memories. As ghosts are used in the lyrics to represent the imagery of memories, the choruses that flash in the left and right channels are like ghosts’ whispering in the listener's ears.
8. “(......Drunkard Ah Q)”（......醉鬼阿Q）
  Associating from Lu Xun's short story The True Story of Ah Q all the way to the movie Forrest Gump, the song describes the ambition to create, making one willing to indulge himself in the outside world and fearlessly escape from the right track. The mythological allusions quoted in the lyrics include the lotus-eaters in Homer's epic poem, “Kuafu Chases The Sun” and “Jingwei Fills The Sea” in The Cannon of The Sierras And Oceans.
9. “(......Brown Haired Girl)”（......棕髮少女）
  The song reflects the singer's pondering on "the relationship between the creator and the inspiration". The image of a brown-haired girl embodies the nearly faith-like inspiration that has every creator haunted day and night and makes them worship.
10. “(......Dance of the Gnomes)” （......侏儒之舞）
  The Dodo, an extinct bird, is used as a metaphor in the song to talk about the spirit of daring to be different and to be brave to express in relation to creation. Looking for a tone different from his previous works, Qing-Feng Wu invited Jasmine Sokko, an electronic artist, to collaborate with in the music arrangement.
11. “(......Le Petit Prince)”（......小王子）
  The song talks about creation from the perspective of healing and taming. This is also the only work in the album that Qing-Feng didn’t participate in the arrangement and completely left it to ohashi to compose, produce and mix.
12. “(......Sleeping Beauty)”（......睡美人）
  The whole album starts with consciousness and ends with unconsciousness. The line "...when you wake in a century you won’t suffer the passion anymore” in the lyrics is inspired by the background story related to Bach's “St. Matthew Passion", for the work was not paid attention to by the world until a hundred years after (the work was not noticed by the contemporaries at the time of publication until a hundred years later when Mendelssohn discovered and performed it). Thus, Qing-Feng Wu introduces his view of creation:creation is like a knee reflex of his own life. It is no longer important whether his works are accepted by the contemporary social values or not. In terms of music arrangement, the song quotes phrases from Claude Debussy's "Clair de Lune", and the ending also incorporates "Om Shanti", the prayer from Sanskrit "Shanti Mantras", to bless the world.

== Music videos ==
Title	Director	Premiere Date
(......Fragments d’un Discours Amoureux) (feat. Karena Lam)	Peifu Chen (陳霈芙)	July 29, 2022
(......Drunkard Ah Q) (feat. Stefanie Sun)	Shockley Huang (黃中平)	September 16, 2022
(......The Great Hypnotist) (feat. Maîtrise Saint-Marc - Les Choristes)	Lee, Po-En (李伯恩)	September 23, 2022
(......Le Petit Prince) (feat. ohashiTrio)	Shockley Huang (黃中平)	October 18, 2022
(......When the Ghost Got Lost) (feat. Yoed Nir)	Lin Mao (林毛)	November 1, 2022
(......Brown Haired Girl) (feat. Lisa Ono)	Zen Huang (黃子然), Bunhaku Sai (崔文駮)	November 15, 2022
(......Siren Salon) (feat. Beni Ninagawa of WagakkiBand)	Show Yanagisawa (柳沢 翔)	December 2, 2022

== Accolades ==
=== Golden Melody Awards ===
Year	Ceremony	Category	Nominee	Result
2023	34th Golden Melody Awards	Album of the Year	Mallarme's Tuesdays	Won
2023	34th Golden Melody Awards	Best Mandarin Album	Mallarme's Tuesdays	Nominated
2023	34th Golden Melody Awards	Best Male Mandarin Singer	Wu Qing-feng	Nominated
2023	34th Golden Melody Awards	Producer of the Year, Album	Wu Qing-feng, Howe Chen (Mallarme's Tuesdays)	Nominated
2023	34th Golden Melody Awards	Best Instrumental Composition	Wu Qing-feng（......Fragments d'un Discours Amoureux）(feat. Karena Lam)	Nominated
2023	34th Golden Melody Awards	Best Music Arrangement	Wu Qing-feng, Howe Chen（......The Great Hypnotist）(feat. Maîtrise Saint-Marc - Les Choristes)	Nominated
2023	34th Golden Melody Awards	Best Music Video	Show Yanagisawa（......Siren Salon）(feat. Beni Ninagawa of WagakkiBand)	Nominated

=== Others ===
Year	Ceremony	Category	Nominee	Result
2022	Hit FM	Top 10 best albums in 2022	Mallarme's Tuesdays	Won
