= Zooey Wonder =

Zooey Wonder 黃玠瑋
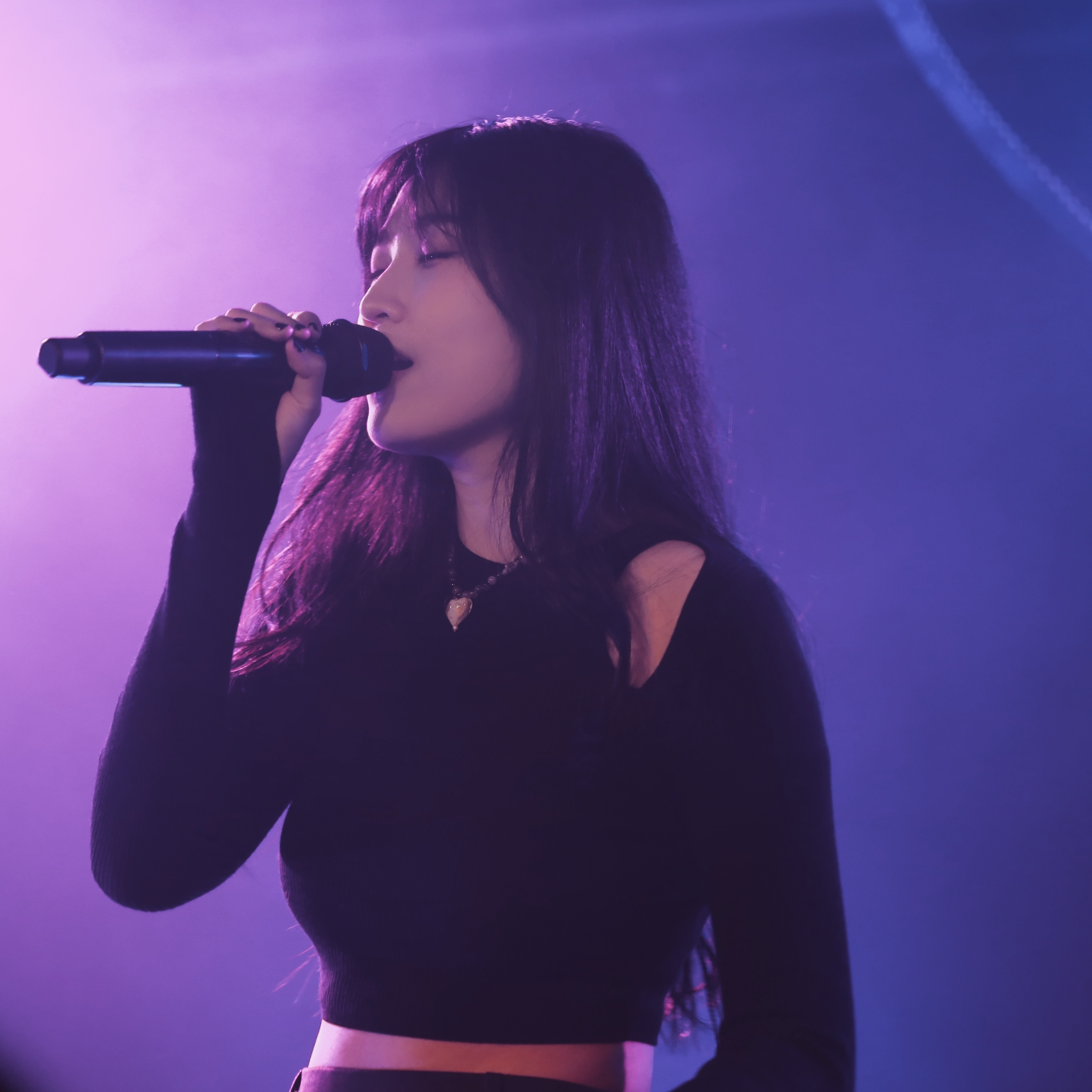
- Performing at The Wall Taipei in 2024

Background information
- Born: 黃玠瑋; February 11, 1991 (age 35)
- Genres: Indie folk; synth-pop; minimalist pop; ambient electronica
- Occupations: Singer-songwriter; producer
- Instruments: Vocals; guitar; piano; synthesizer
- Years active: 2011–present
- Label: Universal Music Taiwan

Zooey Wonder (Traditional Chinese: 黃玠瑋; Huang JieWei; born February 11, 1991) is a Taiwanese singer-songwriter and music producer. Her body of work spans acoustic folk, electronic synth-pop, and minimalist pop. She debuted in 2011 with the single "Miss You" (思念你), and has since released two full-length studio albums: WONDERLAND (2017) and Nomadland (游牧; 2022). Nomadland received multiple nominations at the Golden Melody Awards and Golden Indie Music Awards.

== Early life and education ==
Wonder's father worked as a sound engineer, and she has described singing into spare microphones around the house as a child, which led her grandmother to enroll her in piano lessons. In middle school, exposure to international networks such as MTV and Channel V broadened her listening, and she has cited discovering Avril Lavigne as a turning point in deciding to pursue songwriting. She attended National Taipei University of Business and later National Taiwan University of Arts. In college, she joined the pop music club, where she learned several instruments, formed a band, and began writing original material. That work led to recognition from campus judges and, subsequently, regular performances at local cafés, which marked the start of her live career.

== Musical style ==
Wonder's music combines elements of minimalist pop, ambient electronica, and indie folk. Her early work, including the 2012 EP The Courage of Facing Tomorrow (面對明日的勇氣), drew primarily on acoustic singer-songwriter conventions. A vocal cord injury in 2013 interrupted her career; during her recovery, she supported herself with part-time jobs while rebuilding her vocal technique, and began working with synthesizers, digital audio workstations, and electronic drum programming.

That shift informed her crowdfunded debut album, WONDERLAND (2017), which paired electronic arrangements with more organic melodic elements, a contrast that has remained a recurring feature of her production work. Her second album, Nomadland (游牧, 2022), returned to more organic instrumentation and explored themes of introspection and self-healing through atmospheric arrangements, themes she has continued to revisit in later releases.

== Career and collaborations ==
Wonder has taken part in several cross-cultural and multimedia projects. In 2016, her track "Wonderland" was featured in Lifeline, a short film written and directed by Academy Award-winning screenwriter Armando Bó. She served as an opening act for British singer-songwriter Lucy Rose in 2016 and for American post-rock project The Album Leaf during their 2017 Taipei tour, later appearing as a guest vocalist at The Album Leaf's 2023 concert. She also appeared as a guest performer alongside Japanese indie rock band DYGL during their 2016 Taipei concert, presented by Airhead Records.

Her studio collaborations reach across genres and borders. In 2017, she co-wrote and provided guest vocals on "CRYSTALLE" with the Japanese indie-electro band UQiYO for their album Stones. She returned to collaborative work in 2020 with "You Hurt Me Deeply" (再也不見), a duet with Wu Qing-feng (吳青峰). The following year, she contributed "Don't Leave Me Alone" (我不想一個人) as the official theme song for the Taiwanese film Leave Me Alone (不想一個人).

She has continued to release singles regularly, including "An Introvert's Love Song" (i人情歌, 2025), and "Go With the Flow" (順流, 2026). In early 2026, she partnered with Oumua (埃穆亞), a VTuber from the Xtreme Deep Field Project, for a mixed-reality music video accompanying "An Introvert's Love Song." Taiwanese studio SIGONO also invited her to contribute the track "Prismic Light" (光在遠方, April 2026) as the ending theme for OPUS: Prism Peak (OPUS: 心相吾山), a game that went on to receive a "Gold Hall of Fame" rating from Famitsu.

== Performances ==
Wonder has toured and performed as a headliner in support of her releases, including the 2017 WONDERLAND tour, the 2022 Nomadland concert, the early-2024 See You Down the Road tour, and the late-2024 She's A Trouble tour. The latter was staged as part of Legacy's "Urban Voice Concert" (都市女聲) series in Taiwan. In 2026, she marked the release of "Love, Hate, Dance" with a Live House concert of the same name, presented as an intimate, living-room-style show.

She has performed at a number of festivals in Taiwan, including an early appearance at The Next Big Thing (大團誕生) showcase, and later at the Simple Life Festival (簡單生活節), Megaport Festival (大港開唱), Rock in Taichung (搖滾台中), the Zero Festival (利落音樂節), and the Pingtung Spring Music Festival (屏東三大日音樂節). Her international appearances include Hong Kong's premier international music festival, Clockenflap. She has also performed at multiple editions of The Calling Festival (呼叫音樂節), including its overseas showcases, as well as at public televised events such as Christmasland in New Taipei City (新北歡樂耶誕城) and the 2023 Taitung New Year's Eve Concert (台東跨年晚會).

In 2016, an acoustic version of her track "Wonderland" was performed in Lifeline, a short film written and directed by Academy Award-winning screenwriter Armando Bó. In 2017, Wonder was selected as a showcasing artist for South by Southwest (SXSW) in Austin, Texas, as part of the "Taiwan Beats" lineup. In 2019, she was longlisted for the MIDEM Artist Accelerator program at the MIDEM music exhibition in Cannes, France.

== Reception ==
Wonder has worked with established producers and musical directors on her arrangements over the course of her career. Her music has been frequently featured on Spotify editorial playlists, and several of her singles, including "I Could Be Yours" and "Go With the Flow" (順流), have charted on the Spotify Viral 50 – Taiwan chart. Her 2024 single "She's a Trouble" was included on Apple Music's 2024 百大最佳歌曲 (Top 100 Best Songs of 2024) playlist for Taiwan.

== Production work ==
Alongside her solo output, Wonder works as a producer, arranger, and vocal engineer, taking on projects involving harmony composition, vocal production and editing, synthesizer programming, and track arrangement.

Her production credits span both mainstream and independent releases in the Mandarin-language market, including work for Taiwanese indie and alternative acts, for whom she has provided audio editing, vocal production, and mixing services.

== Discography ==
=== Studio albums ===
Title	Album details
WONDERLAND	Released: March 10, 2017 - Label: Independent release
Nomadland (游牧)	Released: March 18, 2022 - Label: Universal Music

=== Extended plays ===
Title	EP details
The Courage of Facing Tomorrow (面對明日的勇氣)	Released: December 1, 2012 - Label: 風和日麗唱片行
Decode (親愛的，你聽見了嗎？)	Released: September 19, 2015 - Label: 風和日麗唱片行
B-Side	Released: 2017 - Label: Independent release
Fog Forest (Remixes)	Released: June 8, 2018 - Label: Independent release

=== Singles ===
Title	Release date	Label
"Miss You" (思念你)	December 11, 2011	Independent release
"You Hurt Me Deeply" (再也不見) (feat. 吳青峰)	May 15, 2020	Cat's Pyjamas
"Weirdo Company" (桃樂絲與我)	October 14, 2020	Cat's Pyjamas
"I Could Be Yours"	January 29, 2021	Cat's Pyjamas
"Don't leave me alone" (我不想一個人)	December 3, 2021	Universal Music
"Me Time" (喜歡一個人)	December 17, 2021	Universal Music Taiwan
"Little Present"	December 16, 2022	Universal Music Taiwan
"She's A Trouble"	November 1, 2024	Universal Music Taiwan
"At the End of My Dream" (夢的盡頭是你)	April 15, 2025	Universal Music Taiwan
"An Introvert's Love Song" (i 人情歌)	November 21, 2025	Universal Music Taiwan
"Go With the Flow" (順流)	March 17, 2026	Universal Music Taiwan
"Prismic Light" (光在遠方)	April 16, 2026	Rare Drop
"Love, Hate, Dance" (相愛相殺的舞步)	April 24, 2026	Universal Music Taiwan
"Falling" (黃奕儒 Ezu feat. Zooey Wonder)	August 11, 2026	Wonder Music

== Awards and nominations ==
Year	Award	Category / Work	Nominated work	Result
2013	The Next Big Thing (大團誕生)	Top Ten New Bands of the Year	—	Won
2013	7th Freshmusic Awards	EP of the Year	The Courage of Facing Tomorrow	Nominated
2016	ELLE Taiwan Young Heart New Power Music Award	Best New Style Artist	—	Won
2016	Hello Asia C-POP Awards	Best New Artist	—	Won
2016	9th Freshmusic Awards	Best EP	Decode	Nominated
2017	8th Golden Indie Music Awards	Best Genre Single	"Fog Forest"	Nominated
2018	11th Freshmusic Awards	Breakthrough of the Year	Wonderland	Nominated
2018	18th Chinese Music Media Awards	Best New Female Artist (Mandarin)	—	Nominated
2018	Global Chinese Golden Chart Awards	Most Exploratory Musician	—	Won
2022	13th Golden Indie Music Awards	Best Singer-Songwriter	Nomadland	Nominated
2022	13th Golden Indie Music Awards	Best Alternative Pop Song	"Nomadland"	Nominated
2023	16th Freshmusic Awards	Top Ten Singles of the Year	—	Won
2023	34th Golden Melody Awards	Best Composer	"Nomadland"	Nominated
2023	34th Golden Melody Awards	Best Vocal Recording Album	Nomadland	Nominated
2023	34th Golden Melody Awards	Best Single Producer	"Nomadland" (producer: Chen Chun-hao)	Nominated

== Songwriting and production credits ==
Year	Artist	Album	Song	Credit
2011	Zooey Wonder	"Miss You" (first demo)	"Miss You" (思念你)	Lyrics, composition
2012	Zooey Wonder	The Courage of Facing Tomorrow (EP)	"The Courage of Facing Tomorrow" (面對明日的勇氣)	Lyrics, composition, arrangement, acoustic guitar, co-production (with Wu Chih-ning)
2012	Zooey Wonder	The Courage of Facing Tomorrow (EP)	"Buster" (百視達)	Lyrics, composition, arrangement, acoustic guitar, co-production (with Wu Chih-ning)
2015	Zooey Wonder	Decode (EP)	"Decode" (親愛的，你聽見了嗎？)	Lyrics, composition, arrangement, electric guitar, MIDI
2015	Zooey Wonder	Decode (EP)	"Miss You" (思念你)	Lyrics, composition, arrangement, electric guitar, MIDI, bass
2015	Zooey Wonder	Decode (EP)	"The Fault in Our Stars" (生命中的美好缺憾)	Lyrics, composition, arrangement, electric guitar, MIDI
2017	Zooey Wonder	WONDERLAND	"Fog Forest"	Lyrics, composition (with 李詠恩), co-production (with 張育維), backing vocal arrangement (with 李詠恩, 簡愛), backing vocals (with 簡愛)
2017	Zooey Wonder	WONDERLAND	"Mermaid" (人魚)	Lyrics, composition, backing vocals (with 董兆怡)
2017	Zooey Wonder	WONDERLAND	"Winter Sun" (暖陽)	Lyrics, composition, backing vocals (with 董兆怡)
2017	Zooey Wonder	WONDERLAND	"Chaos"	Lyrics, composition, co-production (with 張育維), backing vocals, backing vocal arrangement
2017	Zooey Wonder	WONDERLAND	"Good Time" (沉靜的瘋狂)	Lyrics, composition, arrangement (with 李詠恩), backing vocal arrangement (with 李詠恩), backing vocals (with 盧羿安), electric guitar (with 唐維璠), synthesizer
2017	Zooey Wonder	WONDERLAND	"Syria"	Lyrics, composition, co-production (with 張育維)
2017	Zooey Wonder	WONDERLAND	"Love Will Fix Everything" (愛能修復一切)	Lyrics, composition, backing vocals (with 簡愛)
2017	Zooey Wonder	WONDERLAND	"Muse" (真實的存在)	Lyrics, composition, co-production, arrangement (with 李詠恩)
2017	Zooey Wonder	WONDERLAND	"Wish You a Merry Xmas"	Lyrics, composition
2017	Zooey Wonder	WONDERLAND	"Wonderland"	Lyrics, composition, co-production (with 張育維), arrangement (with 林昀駿), backing vocal arrangement (with 張育維), backing vocals (with 董兆怡), electric guitar (with 林昀駿)
2017	蔡任博	派樂黛H4 至聖先師	"Turning Point" (feat. Zooey Wonder)	Lyrics, composition (with 蔡任博)
2017	Walrussound (海象之聲)	漫遊者	"Hold on to You" (feat. Zooey Wonder)	Lyrics, composition (with 蔡任博)
2017	UQiYO	Stones	"CRYSTALLE" (feat. Zooey Wonder)	Lyrics
2018	VH	求救訊號 I'm Not OK	"Move On" (拾起)	Backing vocals, backing vocal arrangement (with 韓立康)
2018	莉莉周她說 (Lily Chou-Chou Lied)	於是跟深愛的打了一場架 (EP)	"睡"	Mixing
2018	Waa Wei (魏如萱)	Milk and Honey (live album, 2 CD)	"脫光光" (Live)	Arrangement (co-arranged with 韓立康 and others)
2018	Waa Wei (魏如萱)	Milk and Honey (live album, 2 CD)	"if" (Live)	Arrangement (with Mandark Liang)
2018	自由落體	Drop	"平流"	Mixing, backing vocals
2018	Jolin Tsai (蔡依林)	UGLY BEAUTY	"Vulnerability (如果我沒有傷口)"	Backing vocal arrangement
2018	Jolin Tsai (蔡依林)	UGLY BEAUTY	"Ugly Beauty" (愛的羅曼死)	Backing vocal arrangement (with 陳君豪)
2018	Yoga Lin (林宥嘉)	林宥嘉idol 世界巡迴演唱會	"請說"	Arrangement (co-arranged with 韓立康)
2019	傻子與白痴	夜長夢少	"象牙舟"	Vocal editing (with 李詠恩, 蔡周翰)
2019	鄭興	眼淚博物館	"雨季不再來"	Vocal editing (with 李詠恩)
2019	陳以恆	但係我袂惊惶	"心愛的我會等"	Vocal editing
2019	持修	房間裡的大象	"你想去哪"	Backing vocals (with 顏靜萱)
2019	許含光	西伯利亞	"西伯利亞" (feat. Hello Nico)	Vocal editing
2020	Accusefive (告五人)	與少年他 (compilation)	"說我愛你的一百種方式"	Backing vocal arrangement
2020	Zooey Wonder	T-POP: No Fear in Love (compilation)	"Love Can Fix Everything" (2020 version)	Lyrics, composition (with 李詠恩), production, backing vocals, backing vocal arrangement (with 簡愛), recording (with 李詠恩, 張育維, 單為明), mixing (at Cat’s Pyjamas)
2020	鄭興	眼淚博物館	"過於喧囂的孤獨"	Backing vocals (with 鄭興, 謝至平, 羅晧耘, 張立長)
2020	Zooey Wonder	"You Hurt Me Deeply" (再也不見)	"You Hurt Me Deeply" (再也不見) (feat. 吳青峰)	Lyrics and composition, production (with 鍾濰宇, 陳君豪), arrangement (with 鍾濰宇), electric guitar, piano, synth and drum programming (with 鍾濰宇), backing vocal arrangement (with 吳青峰), backing vocals, audio editing (with 張育維, 鍾濰宇, 沈冠霖)
2020	Zooey Wonder	"Dorothy and I"	"Dorothy and I" (桃樂絲與我)	Composition, arrangement, production (with 張育維)
2021	Zooey Wonder	"I Could Be Yours"	"I Could Be Yours"	Lyrics, composition, arrangement, production (with 張育維, 徐文), drum programming (with 張育維)
2021	Zooey Wonder	"Don't leave me alone"	"Don't leave me alone" (我不想一個人)	Lyrics, composition (with 徐文, Yang Zhong Fan, 鄭仰山)
2021	Zooey Wonder	"Me Time"	"Me Time" (喜歡一個人)	Composition, lyrics (with 徐文), backing vocals, backing vocal arrangement (with 海大富)
2022	Zooey Wonder	Nomadland	"Give It Up"	Lyrics, composition, arrangement (with 鍾濰宇), production (with 鍾濰宇), backing vocals and backing vocal arrangement, Pro Tools engineering (with 張育維)
2022	Zooey Wonder	Nomadland	"The Hedgehog" (柔軟的刺蝟)	Composition, lyrics (with 徐文)
2022	Zooey Wonder	Nomadland	"Iceberg" (冰山)	Composition, lyrics (with 徐文), arrangement (with 鍾承洋), backing vocals and backing vocal arrangement, guitar (with 鍾承洋, 屠衡)
2022	Zooey Wonder	Nomadland	"Me Time ♡" (喜歡一個人)	Composition, lyrics (with 徐文), backing vocals, backing vocal arrangement (with 海大富)
2022	Zooey Wonder	Nomadland	"The River of Time" (時間的河流)	Composition, lyrics (with 徐文), percussion, backing vocals and backing vocal arrangement
2022	Zooey Wonder	Nomadland	"Dark Clouds in My Room" (客廳裡的烏雲)	Composition, lyrics (with 徐文), arrangement (with 林昀駿), backing vocals (with 布蘭地), backing vocal arrangement
2022	Zooey Wonder	Nomadland	"Dare To Be Happy" (我連快樂都不敢了)	Composition (with 秦旭章), lyrics (with 徐文), arrangement (with 林昀駿), backing vocals and backing vocal arrangement
2022	Zooey Wonder	Nomadland	"My Dignity" (恰如其分的自尊)	Composition, lyrics (with 張西, 徐文), arrangement (with 李宜玲), backing vocals and backing vocal arrangement
2022	Zooey Wonder	Nomadland	"Everything Will Be Fine" (我們終會相聚)	Composition, lyrics (with 徐文), arrangement (with 楊子霆), backing vocals and backing vocal arrangement, guitar (with 蔡侑良, 楊子霆)
2022	Zooey Wonder	Nomadland	"Nomadland" (游牧)	Composition, lyrics (with 徐文), backing vocals and backing vocal arrangement, guitar (with 蔡侑良, 楊子霆)
2022	Christine Fan (范瑋琪)	恰如其分的自己	"自修室日記"	Backing vocal arrangement, backing vocals (with Christine Fan)
2022	Zooey Wonder	"Little Present"	"Little Present"	Lyrics, composition, production (with Everydaze), arrangement (with Everydaze), piano (with 張少瑜), backing vocals and backing vocal arrangement
2024	莉森	光圈	"光圈"	Composition (with LIU KOI, 李岦誱, 王彙筑)
2024	Zooey Wonder	"She's A Trouble"	"She's A Trouble"	Lyrics, composition, production, backing vocals and backing vocal arrangement, Pro Tools engineering (with 張育維, 莊子萱)
2024	守夜人	我以為宇宙跟我說好了	"我以為宇宙跟我說好了"	Vocal production (with 秦旭章)
2024	守夜人	我以為宇宙跟我說好了	"漂浮到"	Vocal production (with 秦旭章)
2024	守夜人	我以為宇宙跟我說好了	"言靈"	Vocal production (with 秦旭章)
2024	守夜人	我以為宇宙跟我說好了	"覺得自己多餘的時候"	Vocal production
2025	Zooey Wonder	白日夢與她 (soundtrack)	"At the End of My Dream" (夢的盡頭是你)	Backing vocal arrangement (with 陳鈞瑋), backing vocals
2025	Ivy Tseng (曾沛慈)	下週同樣時間	"最後一次哭"	Backing vocal arrangement
2025	董柏霖	允許萬物破碎	"好像被一支箭矢跟蹤"	Composition (co-written with PoLin)
2025	賀予彤Yutong	倒立的睫毛	"I Swear I Want to Be Beautiful" (我發誓我要美麗)	Backing vocal arrangement
2025	守夜人	滾石撞樂隊2	"躺在你的衣櫃"	Vocal production (with 秦旭章)
2025	黃則翔	相相sio-siòng	"海上煙火"	Vocal editing
2025	黃則翔	相相sio-siòng	"相相sio-siòng"	Vocal editing
2025	黃則翔	相相sio-siòng	"one-two-媠啦"	Vocal editing
2025	黃則翔	相相sio-siòng	"奈何橋"	Vocal editing
2025	黃則翔	相相sio-siòng	"宛那哭宛那笑"	Vocal editing
2025	黃則翔	相相sio-siòng	"由在"	Vocal editing
2025	黃則翔	相相sio-siòng	"外口的世界真闊"	Vocal editing
2025	黃則翔	相相sio-siòng	"無你欲按怎"	Vocal editing
2025	黃則翔	相相sio-siòng	"雲遊四海"	Vocal editing
2025	Zooey Wonder	"An Introvert's Love Song"	"An Introvert's Love Song" (i 人情歌)	Lyrics and composition (with 陳君豪), production, drums (with 張少瑜, 錢威良), backing vocal arrangement (with 李詠恩), backing vocals
2026	安眠巫師, Zooey Wonder	"Go With the Flow"	"Go With the Flow" (順流)	Lyrics (with 秦旭章)
2026	Zooey Wonder	OPUS: 心相吾山 (soundtrack)	"Prismic Light" (光在遠方)	Backing vocal arrangement, backing vocals
2026	Zooey Wonder	"Love, Hate, Dance"	"Love, Hate, Dance" (相愛相殺的舞步)	Lyrics and composition (with 林言奕, 方炯鎵, 姚書寰, 何維健)
2026	鄒序	無端	"雲端假期"	Vocal production
2026	鄒序	無端	"想想而已"	Vocal production
2026	黃奕儒 Ezu	"Falling"	"Falling" (feat. Zooey Wonder)	Vocals, backing vocal arrangement (with 黃奕儒 Ezu), backing vocals (with 黃奕儒 Ezu)
