= Folio Vol.1: One and One =

Folio Vol.1：One and One

Studio album by Wu Qing-feng
- Released: November 13, 2020
- Genre: Mandopop
- Label: Universal Music Taiwan

Wu Qing-feng chronology
Spaceman (2019)	Folio Vol.1：One and One (2020)	Mallarme's Tuesdays (2022)

Folio Vol.1: One and One is the second studio album by Taiwanese singer-songwriter Qing-Feng Wu, containing 16 songs, released on November 13, 2020. The producer of Recto is Showy Hsu, and the producer of Verso is Hu Yi Liu. Recto has eight songs composed by Qing-Feng Wu for the selected poets, and Verso has another eight songs of which the lyrics were written by Qing-Feng for the selected musicians.

== Background ==
Since 2004, aside from taking care of the music projects of the band and of his own, Qing-Feng Wu has received many invitations for various music collaborations, including giving his unpublished songs to other artists to perform, writing customized lyrics for other artists and soundtrack projects for TV, cinema and theaters.

When organizing the works collaborated with other artists these years, Qing-Feng Wu selected his favorite 16 songs to re-interpret them from his personal angle and had them reproduced, recorded, arranged and performed in a whole new way to present this double album. During the production session, Qing-Feng Wu and his producers Showy Hsu and Hu Yi Liu shared the same principle that they "listened to the original demos and based on their intuitive feelings and imagination", they would have the discussion together. All vocal parts in the album were recorded by Qing-Feng Wu at home.

=== Concept and production ===
When selecting the songs to be collected in the album, Qing Feng Wu specifically chose those that made him associate with sea images and imagery. The hidden theme of Recto is about the "sea" spatially, while the hidden theme of Retro is about "experiences" temporally and the themes resemble the idea of stepping on land, encounters with others and bond with others. When two axes, i.e., time and space meet, a three-dimensional One and One is born.

=== Visual concept and album packaging design ===
The album design, ranging from the choice of the font, materials to packaging, echoes to the concept of "when lyrics meet the melodies", "one and one" and the "sea" imagery that runs through the entire album. The gatefold cover presents different sceneries respectively on the both sides, and the image of waves and stone textures is arranged under where the disk is placed.

=== Musicality ===
When talking about his experience of writing lyrics and songs for other artists, Qing-Feng Wu said "Although composing a song based on lyrics and writing lyrics based on the given melody are seemingly reversed experiences, they are still similar to me whether I read the lyrics or hear the melody first, as I always translate them into images before l make them become musical notes or words.

Qing-Feng Wu has always been intuitive when creating his music works. When writing lyrics for others' melodies, he usually "writes down whatever comes into his mind when listening to the demos". To him, words themselves are also a kind of music, a type of instrument, like the lyrics he writes for others are the sounds and rhythms resonating in his head when he listens to the original melody. When he composes music for others' lyrics, it is like writing soundtracks for the stories of others – "like writing a book about what's seen and heard on the sea."

The lyricists of Recto include Yanling Xu (徐堰鈴), Katie Lee, Huan-Hsiung Li (黎煥雄) and Hung-Ya Yen (鴻鴻); they are either famous poets or experienced artists in theater production. The dictions in the lyrics are keen, fresh, free from conventional rhythms and schemes, which inspire Qing-Feng Wu to compose the songs out of the box, different from the neat structure of common music forms.

== Track listing ==
=== Recto ===
- All tracks are composed by Qing-Feng Wu, except the "Ms. Pheromone", which is composed by Qing-Feng Wu and Chou Lan-Ping (周藍萍).
- All tracks are produced by Showy Hsu (徐千秀).

No.	Title	Lyrics	Length
1.	"Ms. Pheromone" (費洛蒙小姐)	Yanling Xu (徐堰鈴)
2.	"I Will I Will" (我會我會)	Yanling Xu (徐堰鈴)
3.	"Freud on the Beach" (沙灘上的佛洛一德)	Katie Lee (李格弟)
4.	"The Hardest Thing of All is Meeting You" (最難的是相遇)	Katie Lee (李格弟)
5.	"Alzheimer's" (阿茲海默)	Huan-Hsiung Li (黎煥雄)
6.	"The Man Who Could Walk Through Walls" (穿牆人)	Hung-ya Yen (鴻鴻)
7.	"Softly Softly" (柔軟)	Katie Lee (李格弟)
8.	"The Stars Hang Low" (低低星垂)	Katie Lee (李格弟)

=== Verso ===
- All tracks are written by Qing-Feng Wu
- All tracks are produced by Hu Yi Liu (劉胡軼)

No.	Title	Music	Length
1.	"Sea of Tranquillity" (寧靜海)	Paige Su (蘇珮卿)
2.	"Waiting" (等)	Jiahui Wu (伍家輝)
3.	"Murmur of the Tree Rings" (年輪說)	YuJie Zheng (鄭宇界)
4.	"Imprisoned" (困在)	Maximilian Hecker
5.	"Bit by bit" (一點點)	Yoga Lin (林宥嘉)
6.	"Hallucination" (迷幻)	Mikko Tamminen、Udo Mechels、Rike Boomgaarden
7.	"Moon River" (月亮河)	Henry Mancini、John Mercer
8.	"Aurora" (極光)	Tanya Chua (蔡健雅)

== Background of collected tracks ==
=== Recto ===
1. "Ms. Pheromone" (費洛蒙小姐)
  This is the first music composition that Greeny Wu composed others. "Ms. Pheromone" was originally created for theatre director Yanling Xu's stage play Touching Skin in 2004. The arrangement of the song was inspired to elaborate by the lyrics written by Yangling Xu and combined the Huangmei tone soundtrack "Shi Ba Xiang Song" (十八相送, Farewell for 18 Miles) in the movie The Love Eterne with rock music element to construct the intense and dramatic expression emotionally.
2. "I Will I Will"(我會我會)
  Like "Ms. Pheromone", this song was made for theatre director Yanling Xu's stage play Touching Skin in 2004. The new interpretation is solely composed of vocals, as the background vocals are layered with technological harmonic distortion to represent that the emotional expression of the people today is usually transmitted via digital media. The transposed chords in the latter part of the song imply the inevitable distortion during the transmission. The edition released in this album has re-composed the first half of the main theme, which, therefore, is different from the original version.
3. "Freud on the Beach" (沙灘上的佛洛一德)
  The song was written in 2005, originally a soundtrack created for Jimmy Liao's musical Mr. Wing. Producer Showy Hsu kept all the melodic lines in piano (such as obvious flats, semitones and ornaments) from the original demo, and based on the above to develop an exotic arrangement of the song.
4. "The Hardest Thing of All is Meeting You" (最難的是相遇)
  The song was written in 2012, originally collected in Valen Hsu's studio album Miracle (2014). The arrangement of the song echoes the lyrics written by Katie Lee to create an auditory experience, like a small boat slowly sails on the sea, swaying along the waves leisurely.
5. "Alzheimer's" (阿茲海默)
  The song was written in 2012, originally collected in Wan-Fang's studio album Love, after all (2013). The song depicts a subjective condition when one loses memories and falls into chaos. The arrangement of the song as well as the vocal expression both aim to represent the emotional pictures the singer immediately sensed when composing the music, such as the sense of astonishment, bewilderment, weariness, violence and the sense of sweetness when the fragmented memories flash back.
6. "The Man Who Could Walk Through Walls" (穿牆人)
  The song was written in 2007, originally the theme song for movie director Hung-ya Yen's forth film The Wall-Passer (2007) and was firstly performed by the leading actress of the film Jozie Lu. The movie was inspired by the short satire story The Man Who Walked through Walls written by French novelist Marcel Aymé. The poem under the same title of the movie mockingly describes the rebellious behaviors of an adolescent. Qing-Feng's composition has brought out the gaming playfulness and the layering richness of the song by using the ascending whole-tone scale that deviates the tonality and the accelerating rhythm to match the stringed music and the saxophone arrangement in the middle and the end of the song.
7. "Softly Softly" (柔軟)
  The song was written in 2012, originally collected in Jeff Chang's studio album Still Love in 2015. Qing-Feng Wu has mentioned that he is always fond of Taiwan's love pop songs between 1995 and 1998 and the composition of Softly Softly has the very ambience and impression of the kind of love pop in those years.
8. "The Stars Hang Low" (低低星垂)
  The song was written in 2008, originally a soundtrack created for the last chapter of Jimmy Liao's musical Turf Left, Turn Right. When composing the melodic lines, Qing-Feng Wu adopted Chopin’s Funeral March and Ravel’s Pavane for a Dead Princess as the foundation as these two pieces have the implication of death to express a sense of closure in the end. The vocals, ranging from solo, duets to chorus, portray all living creatures staring at the starry night reflected on the sea.

=== Verso ===
1. "Sea of Tranquility" (寧靜海)
  The song was written in 2016, originally collected in Paige Su's studio album We Are All Lonely Souls in 2017, duet with Michael Wong. "Sea of Tranquility'' is the lunar mare that sits within the Tranquillitatis basin on the Moon. Although it is named as a “sea", there's actually no water on the surface of the Moon. Qing-Feng said that he has always been very fond of the name "Sea of Tranquility" ever since he was a little and has had the idea to write a song after this name. The composition of the song is composed of the ambient sounds of waves and under the sea along with a line of Morse Code (The decoded message is "thank you for finding me".
2. "Waiting" (等)
  The song was written in 2008, originally collected in Yolanda Yuan's EP Short Stay No.1 Taipei in 2008. The song Waiting describes the swaying inner condition between taking the initiative or staying passively when the pulsating sensation of love comes. The vocal starts like some soft inner murmuring to resemble an initial inquiring and progressively becomes clear and assertive to resemble the evocative vocal expression.
3. "Murmur of the Tree Rings" (年輪說)
  The song was written in 2015, originally collected in Rainie Yang's studio album Traces of Time in Love in 2016. When Qing-Feng Wu received the demo, the song was originally titled "Tree"; he therefore began to picture the image based on the idea of the old title as he was writing the lyrics and developing a metaphor for the tree to represent human beings. The arrangement of the song only adopts vocal and piano to create an auditory sense of bareness to depict the loneliness and emptiness when one looks back on his life.
4. "Imprisoned" (困在)
  The song was written in 2010, originally collected in Waa Wei's studio album Graceful Porcupine in 2010. The composer is German musician Maximilian Hecker. The arrangement of the song, using the reverberation of the guitar and the piano, represents the image coming into the mind of Qing-Feng Wu when he was listening to the melody and arranging the music: a forest shrouded in fog and those who are imprisoned in it.
5. "Bit by Bit" (一點點)
  The song was written in 2016, originally collected in Yoga Lin's studio album Sell Like Hot Cakes in 2016. The lyrics of this released edition are the very work that Qing-Feng created spontaneously right after listening to the demo (The lyrics in the edition released in 2016 were the re-written version after discussing with Yoga Lin) . Qing-Feng's edition of lyrics and the concept of the music arrangement describe the timidity and hesitation of cicadas for spending most of their time underground, and how fearless and loud they sound after they emerge from the soil.
6. "Hallucination" (迷幻)
  The song was written in 2012, originally collected in Jolin Tsai's studio album Muse in 2012. It was the first attempt of Qing-Feng Wu to create a dance music work, for Jolin Tsai wanted to make a song dedicated to queer community. In this specific edition, the arrangement of the song starts with the simple guitar-strumming and keeps only the vocal and drums for the chorus, challenging the stereotypical impression people have about dance music.
7. "Moon River" (月亮河)
  The song was written in 2015, originally a soundtrack created for the movie Didi's Dream directed by Kevin Tsai in 2017. Kevin Tsai wanted to adapt the classic song Moon River sung by Audrey Hepburn into the Chinese version to use it in the movie. Producer Hu Yi Liu suggested Qing-Feng interpret his own version by " feeling at ease like he's singing the demo". The arrangement of the song is structured with the vocal, ambient sounds and the sound of piano from a far in the background, as if a singer, walking and humming at night, indulges himself in his own world of creation.
8. "Aurora" (極光)
  The song was written in 2012, originally collected in Tanya Chua's studio album Angel vs. Devil in 2013. After Tanya Chua finished her journey to aurora, she described what she saw and felt to Qing-Feng who hadn't seen aurora yet. He relied on Tanya's account and his own imagination to finish the lyrics. Aurora, arranged to be placed in the end of the album, brings up all the life views described in the songs in the album. After audience listen to the stories on the sea in Recto and walk through the views constructed with words in Verso, they finally arrive at the destination of the journey. [19]

== Music videos ==
To continue the concept of Folio Vol.1：One and One which is divided into Recto and Verso, the music videos are directed by Jung-Ping Huang (黃中平) and Sandee Chan who were in charge of the music videos of Recto and Verso respectively.

Title	Director	Premiere Date	Notes
Ms. Pheromone (費洛蒙小姐)	Jung-Ping Huang (黃中平)	September 8, 2020	The production of the music video centered on the theatrical origin of the song. The music video was directed by Jung-Ping Huang and the film script was written by theatre director Huan-Hsiung Li (黎煥雄). The heroine "Ms. Pheromone" was played by Vera Chen (陳雪甄), a theater director as well as a movie actress.
The Hardest Thing of All is Meeting You (最難的是相遇)	Jung-Ping Huang (黃中平)	September 18, 2020	The shooting plan and the script were purposely arranged to echo Valen Hsu (許茹芸)'s music video in 2014. The original director Jung-Ping Huang was invited to direct the music video. The leading actor was Moring Mo (莫子儀) and the leading actress was Vera Chen from the music video Ms. Pheromone.
Bit by bit (一點點)	Sandee Chan (陳珊妮)	October 27, 2020	Special Starring: Showy Hsu (徐千秀)
Hallucination (迷幻)	Sandee Chan (陳珊妮)	November 13, 2020	The music video was shot with a high-speed camera that is capable of capturing moving images with exposures of less than 1/1,000-second; therefore, the images seem frozen in time just like that of a painting. To echo the theme of the song, numerous talks of the town because of their unique stories respectively were invited to star in the music video, including otokonoko Norika (織田紀香), Iron Girl Shui Yin (鋼鐵女孩稅尹), coser and illustrator Arger (楊哲), the grandparents and the grandchild of Want Show Laundry (萬秀洗衣店)(Grandpa Wan Ji, Grandma Xiu E and Grandson Reef Chang), gay couple Guan-Hong Chen and Nian-Xiu Guo, Francis Chia, Chairman Leo Ho, fitness coach Sammy, and lesbian couple Vivian and Corrine along with their daughter Cui Gua.

== Concerts ==
To go with the news release for the upcoming new album, 16 Leaves Concert was held from October 16, 2020, to November 8, 2020, at Legacy Taipei, lasting for 16 nights, and Sandee Chan was the creative director of the concert.

After the album was released, Recto and Verso Concert was held on November 14 and 15, 2020 at Cloud Gate Theater in Tamsui to present the complete concept of the new album Folio Vol.1：One and One. As a ticket-free activity, the concert was only available for the music fans who had pre-ordered the album and had to register their pre-order serial numbers for drawing the concert tickets.

== Awards ==
Year	Award	Category	Recipient(s) and nominee(s)	Result
2021	Hit FM	Top 10 Albums of The Year	Folio Vol.1：One and One	Won
2021	The 32nd Golden Melody Award	Best Male Mandarin Singer	Folio Vol.1：One and One	Nominated
