= Wu Qing-feng =

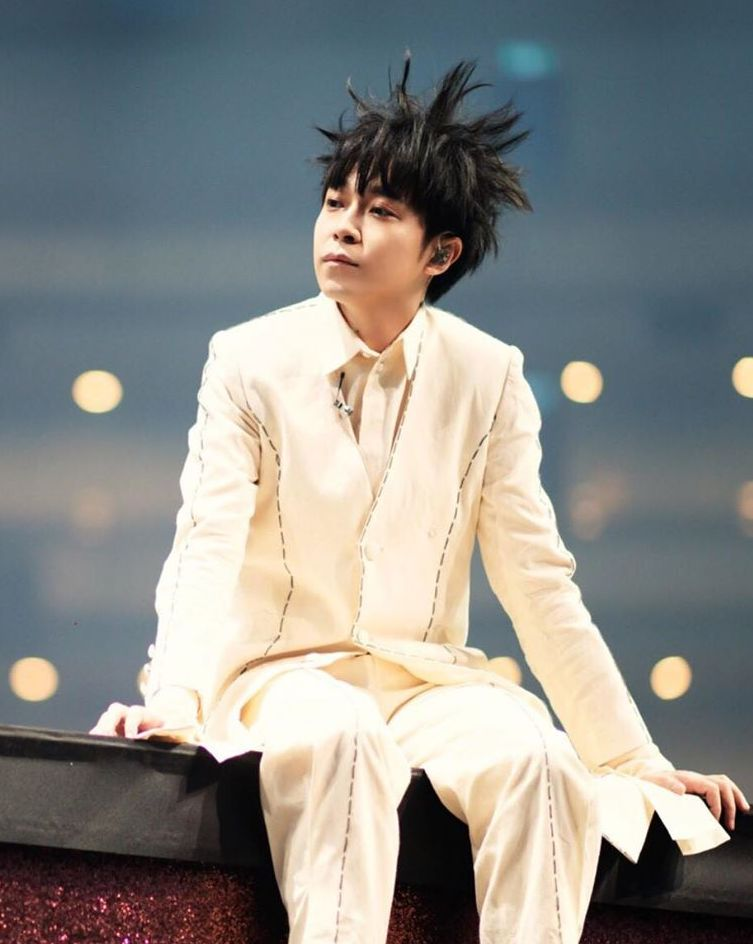
- Wu in 2019
- Born: 30 August 1982 (age 44); Taipei, Taiwan
- Other name: Greeny Wu
- Education: National Chengchi University
- Occupations: Singer; songwriter
- Years active: 2001–present
- Agent: The Harlequin's Carnival Ltd.

Chinese name
- Traditional Chinese: 吳青峰
- Simplified Chinese: 吴青峰
Transcriptions
Standard Mandarin
- Hanyu Pinyin: Wú Qīngfēng
- Wade–Giles: Wu^{2} Ch'ing^{1}-fêng^{1}
Southern Min
- Hokkien POJ: Ngô͘ Chheng-hong
- Musical career
- Genres: Indie pop
- Instruments: Vocals; harmonica; flute; accordion; percussion; piano
- Labels: Willlin; Universal; Big House Little Mountain; The Harlequin's Carnival Ltd.
- Member of: Sodagreen

Wu Qing-feng (traditional Chinese: 吳青峰; simplified Chinese: 吴青峰; pinyin: Wú Qīngfēng; born 1982), also known as Wu Tsing-fong or Greeny Wu, is a Taiwanese singer-songwriter and the lead vocalist of Sodagreen. In addition to being the principal creative force for his own band, he has written songs for numerous artists. He won the 18th Golden Melody Award for Best Composer in 2007 and the 27th Golden Melody Award for Best Lyricist in 2016. He began a solo career in 2018 and released his debut studio album, Spaceman, the following year.

== Early life and career beginnings ==
Wu was born in Taipei, Taiwan and is the youngest son in the family. He went to The Affiliated Senior High School of National Taiwan Normal University (HSNU) and joined the school magazine club as the president and the art editor. He applied to study in the Department of Chinese Literature of National Chengchi University (NCCU) in 2000, double-majoring in the Department of Advertising and minoring in the Department of Business Administration and in the Department of Education.

=== Influences: music ===
Without receiving any formal training, Wu taught himself piano and music theory out of interest. As Wu's elder sister started to learn to play the piano when he was an elementary school student, he used to observe her playing and practiced secretly when no one else was home. Wu enjoyed going to record shops and only listened to classical music, such as the works of Claude Debussy, Erik Satie along with several of his favorite composers.

When he was in junior high school, he listened to Faye Wong's album Sky given by his elder sister, and since then, he "has started to listen to all kinds of genres". He talked about it in an interview:

"Retrospectively, that was the time when music was truly beautiful...from 1994 to 2000. To me, the songs of those years are the most impressive. It probably has something to do with my adolescence. Many of the songs from that time are even more trendy and edgier than those now".

Wu is deeply inspired by the following music artists: Faye Wong, A-Mei, Faith Yang, Jeff Buckley, Tori Amos, Björk, Ringo Sheena, Radiohead, Chyi Yu and Ai Jing. Wu has often covered the works of the above artists in his performance.

=== Influences: writing ===
Wu has always been highly sensitive to words. At the age of 3 or 4, he was taught to write Chinese characters by his grandfather. Whenever there were visitors coming, his grandfather would have him recognize words and recite newspaper aloud as a performance. Wu therefore was able to recognize a great number of words at a very young age. When he was an elementary school boy, he even edited a personal dictionary by comparing several dictionaries. When in college, Wu admired contemporary poets Hsia-Yu (Katie Lee, 夏宇) and Li Chen (陳黎). Qing-Feng's lyrics style has partially inherited the experimentalism and the deconstructive method linguistically and syntactically from the two poets. He also mentioned that the foundation of his lyrics writing may have been built along the process of word-recognition and his habit of reading Chinese dictionaries as a child.

=== Early works ===
Wu first tried to create music when he was in the third year of senior high school after participating in the school music competition Tien-Yun Award (天韻獎). Although he signed up for the competition without having any works ready, he soon wrote his first song Peeping (窺) and more than a dozen songs were composed one after another in the same month. In the end, he won the championship in the Composition Category with his work Peeping and another championship in the Solo Singing Category by performing Tanya Chua's Ji Nian (紀念, Remember). Wu once mentioned that if he had not won first prize at Tien-Yun Award for Composition Category, he would not have realized that he was able to write songs and might have never thought about writing any other songs.

In order to sign up for NCCU Golden Melody (政大金旋獎) in 2001, he started the band Sodagreen with Claire Hsieh, Jyun-Wei Shih and his high school friend Xin-Ge (新哥). By covering Stefanie Sun's My Desired Happiness (我要的幸福), he entered the Solo Singing Final and the Composition Final at NCCU Golden Melody Award with his work Be Late For One Thousand Years (遲到千年). In 2002 Sodagreen participated in NCCU Golden Melody Award again and not only did they win the championship in the Team Category with the work Audiovisual And Illusion In The Air, but also won three more prizes, including the championship, Best Lyrics and Best Composition in Composition Category with the work Flying Fish (飛魚). From2001 to 2004, Wu completed more than 100 songs. About half of them became the works for Sodagreen and the rest of the songs were successively used by other artists.

== Career ==
=== 2004 – Present: Sodagreen ===
On May 30, 2004, Sodagreen had the concert School Rock at NCCU and released the single Audiovisual And Illusion In The Air (空氣中的視聽與幻覺) as their official debut. Since then, Wu has participated in various music collaborations as an individual aside from performing and releasing works with Sodagreen. The collaborations include:

- In 2004, "Ms. Pheromone (費洛蒙小姐)" in the stage play Touching Skin (踏青去) is Wu's first music composition for the lyrics.
- In 2004, Faith Yang's song "Nu Jue (女爵, Dame)" is Wu's first custom-made work for an artist.
- In 2005, Wu featured in Makiyo Kawashima (川島茱樹代) 's studio album Makiyo and Rene Liu's studio album Heard.

=== 2018 – present: Solo work ===
On January 1, 2017, Sodagreen finished their final performance and went hiatus. After taking a break for a year, Wu announced to embark his solo career officially in Spring 2018, attending Spring Wave Music and Art Festival (春浪音樂節) in May as the first performance of his return. Since going solo, Wu has dabbled in numerous new fields, including self-teaching formal music arrangement on computer, releasing the EP Everybody Woohoo that is pop-oriented, mentoring participants in the idol-oriented talent shows.

- In June 2018, Wu took part in the talent show The Coming One 2 (明日之子 第二季) produced by Tencent Video. He was a "Xing Tui Guan (星推官)", an advisor as well as a judge, in the "Du Xiu Sai Dao"(獨秀賽道, Solo Race Track) of the show, leading participants including Wei-Ze Cai (蔡維澤), Lumi Xu (許含光), Yi-Hao Zhang (張洢豪) and Yu-Ming Ceng (曾育茗).
- In January 2019, Wu attended the talent show Singer 2019 (歌手2019) produced by Hunan Television as a "Chuan Jiang Ren"(串講人, host) and also joined the competition in the show.
- In September 2019, Wu released his debut solo album Spaceman and started his Space In Space (太空備忘記) Concert Tour which was unfortunately cancelled in 2020 due to the outbreak of COVID-19.
- On November 14 and 15 2020, at Cloud Gate Theater in Tamsui, Wu had Recto and Verso (上下冊) Concert, combining music performance with theatrical elements to create a brand new show experience.

== Artistry ==
=== Lyrics ===
Wu's lyrics have introduced the art of literacy to Mandopop. The topics range from the gazes at personal life experiences to the social depiction and its allegory. In 2009, Qing-Feng's Be Late For One Thousand Years was selected to be a rhetoric material in the Chinese textbook for the second-year junior high school students.

=== Vocals ===
Wu is good at singing with mixed voice ( a mixture of true voice and falsetto voice close to head voice), and with his nasal resonance, he can transit between true voice and falsetto seamlessly. His singing technique has forged a genderless voice. Wu's way of singing also has something to do with his deviated nasal septum. His vocal range lies between A2 to C6, stretching over 26 intervals and owning more than 3 octaves, making him a singer with a very wide vocal range in Mandopop.

== Personal life ==
Wu does not celebrate his birthday in any form, let alone receive gifts. He is used to taking his birthday light because he sees the day of his birth as the day of his mother's suffering. Having his birthday mentioned by others agonizes him. He mentioned that his friends do know about his disinterest in celebrating his birthday.

== Solo discography ==
=== Extended plays ===
#EP	Title	Publisher	Released Date	Track
1st	Everybody Woohoo	Universal Music	June 22, 2018	CD: 1. Everybody Woohoo (feat. 9m88); 2. Everybody Woohoo (Dizparity Remix); 3. Everybody Woohoo; 4. Everybody Woohoo (Oberka Remix)
2nd	Peeping/When I am Missing You	Universal Music	December 6, 2019	8cmCD: 1. Peeping (20 Year Anniversary Edition); 2. When I am Missing You
3rd	L'Après-midi d'un faune	Universal Music	July 22, 2022	CD: 1. Storm feat. Aurora; 2. A Wanderer In The Sleeping City feat. Rufus Wainwright; 3. 哥倫布的蛋 (The Egg of Colombus) feat. Robin Guthrie; 4. Storm (Chinese Version) feat. Aurora

=== Studio albums ===
Album #	Title	Publisher	Released Date	曲目	Notes
1st	Spaceman	Universal Music	September 6, 2019	CD: 1. 譯夢機 Dream Translator; 2. 回音收集員 The Echo Collector; 3. 巴別塔慶典 The Carnival In Babel; 4. 太空人 Spaceman; 5. 傷風 Influenza; 6. 失憶鎮 The Forgotten Town; 7. 太空 Space; 8. 水仙花之死 Death Of Narcissus; 9. 男孩莊周 Boy Zhuangzi; 10. 太空船 Spaceship; 11. 線的記憶 Story~Lines; 12. Outsider	Album
2nd	Folio Vol.1: One and One	Universal Music	November 20, 2020	CD: 1. 上冊 (CD 1); 2. 〈費洛蒙小姐〉; 3. 〈我會我會〉; 4. 〈沙灘上的佛洛一德〉; 5. 〈最難的是相遇〉; 6. 〈阿茲海默〉; 7. 〈穿牆人〉; 8. 〈柔軟〉; 9. 〈低低星垂〉; 下冊 (CD 2): 1. 〈寧靜海〉; 2. 〈等〉; 3. 〈年輪說〉; 4. 〈困在〉; 5. 〈一點點〉; 6. 〈迷幻〉; 7. 〈月亮河〉; 8. 〈極光〉	Works Collection
3rd	Mallarme's Tuesdays	Universal Music	September 30, 2022	CD 上冊: 1. （......小小牧羊人） (（......The Little Shepherd）) feat. 微光古樂集 The Gleam Ensemble; 2. （......海妖沙龍） (（......Siren Salon）) feat. 蜷川紅; 3. （......催眠大師） (（......The Great Hypnotist）) feat. Maîtrise Saint-Marc - Les Choristes; 4. （......戀人絮語） (（......Fragments d'un Discours Amoureux）) feat. 林嘉欣 Karena Lam; 5. （......千與千尋） (（......Spirited Away）) feat. 佐藤芳明 Yoshiaki Sato; 6. （......老頑固博士） (（......Doctor Headstrong）) feat. 老頑固博士 Dr. Jean-Loup Ringot; 7. （......當幽靈失靈） (（......When the Ghost Got Lost）) feat. Yoed Nir; 8. （......醉鬼阿Q） (（......Drunkard Ah Q）) feat. 孫燕姿 Stefanie Sun; 9. （......棕髮少女） (（......Brown Haired Girl）) feat. 小野麗莎 Lisa Ono; 10. （......侏儒之舞） (（......Dance of the Gnomes）) feat. Jasmine Sokko; 11. （......小王子） (（......Le Petit Prince）) feat. 大橋三重唱 Trio Ohashi; 12. （......睡美人） (（......Sleeping Beauty）) feat. 嚴俊傑 Chun Chieh Yen	Album

=== Singles ===
Year	Title	Released Date	Notes
2010	"Jian Yu Fu Sheng" (剑雨浮生, also known as Hua)	September 6, 2010	Digital single, duet with Ding-Ding Sa, the theme song of movie Reign of Assassins by John Woo Yu-Sen.
2014	"Gen Zhe Ni Dao Tian Bian" (跟著你到天邊, Follow You To The Horizon)	May 15, 2014	Digital single, the theme song of movie Coming Home by Yi-Mou Zhang
2018	"Chuang" (窗, Window)	July 19, 2018	Digital single, the closing theme of TV series Legend of Fuyao
2018	"Kong Wu" (空舞, Empty Dance)	July 24, 2018	Digital single, duet with Li Chen.
2018	"Qing Ting" ( 請聽, Please Listen)	July 27, 2018	Digital single, the theme song of Taichung World Flora Exposition
2018	Bao Bei Er (寶貝兒, Baby)	October 8, 2018	Digital single, the theme song of movie Baby produced by Hsiap-Hsien Hou.
2019	Qi Feng Le (起風了, The Wind Rises)	January 11, 2019	Digital single, cover song, original artist: Yu Takahashi, the theme song of TV series Mr. Fighting.
2019	"Feng Niao" (蜂鳥, Hummingbird)	February 27, 2019	Digital single, the theme song of TV series Waiting in Beijing.
2019	"Ge Zhong Zhe" (歌颂者, Praise)	April 13, 2019	Digital single, the commercial theme for 1MORE PistonBuds Bluetooth Headphone.
2019	"Zuo Wei Guai Wu" (作為怪物, As A Monster)	May 21, 2019	Digital single, duet with Yuchun Li.
2019	"Right Here Waiting for you" (我在原地等你)	November 6, 2019	Digital single, the theme song of movie Right Here Waiting for You.
2020	"My Shadow, My Shelter" (你的影子是我的海)	February 18, 2020	Digital single, pp. 108–110 in Heroin, the poetry work by Miao Wang.
2020	"Zai Ye Bu Jian" (再也不見, You Hurt Me Deeply)	May 15, 2020	Digital single, duet with Zooey Wonder (zh:黃玠瑋).
2020	"Hong Se De He" (紅色的河, The Red River)	July 23, 2020	Digital single, duet with The Life Journey (旅行團樂隊).
2020	"Ling Ge Shi Kong De Ni" (另个时空的你, Another You In Another Universe)	November 20, 2020	Digital single, duet with Misi Ke (柯泯薰), the closing theme of TV series Here Comes Fortune Star.
2020	"Ru Guo Sheng Yin Bu Ji De" (如果声音不记得, If The Voice Does Not Recall)	December 8, 2020	Digital single, the theme song of movie The End of Endless Love directed by Luo Luo and produced by Jing-Ming Guo
2020	"Ya Shang De Bo Niu" (崖上的波妞, Ponyo)	December 21, 2020	Digital single, duet with Lucky Lee, the Mandarin theme song of movie Ponyo (2008).
2021	"Bu Ku" (不苦, No Bitterness)	January 25, 2021	Digital single, the theme song of movie The Soul (2021).
2021	"Shan He Fu Ying" (山河浮影, Floating reflection Of Mountains And Rivers)	March 12, 2021	Digital single, collected in the album Palace Memories produced by Guo Feng Ji in collaboration with National Palace Museum.
2022	"Storm"	June 17, 2022	Digital single, duet with Norwegian singer Aurora.
2022	"A Wanderer in the Sleeping City"	July 19, 2022	Digital single, duet with Canadian singer Rufus Wainwright

== Songwriting and collaboration ==
Qing-Feng wrote his first song "Peeping" in 2000 and won the championship at HSNU Tien-Yun (Heavenly Melody) Award when he was in the third year of senior high school. Since then, Qing-Feng has been very productive as his accumulated works, both published and unpublished, are over hundreds. 90 percent of the songs in Sodagreen are written by Qing-Feng. He also writes songs and lyrics for his fellow artist friends from Hong Kong and Taiwan, such as A-mei, S.H.E, Kay Tse, Alan Tam, Mr., Jolin Tsai, Coco Lee, Angela Zhang, Sandy Lam, Rainie Yang, JJ Lin, Yoga Lin, Jeff Chang, Eason Chan, Paige Su, Denise Ho, Mavis Fan, Waa Wei, Yolanda Yuan, Wan Fang, Jam Hsiao, Gigi Leung, Joey Yung, Aska Yang, Tanya Chua, Cyndi Wang, Stefanie Sun, Valen Hsu, Karen Mok, Ricky Hsiao, Terence Lam, Lala Hsu, Rene Liu and others.

=== Other contributions ===
Released Year	Artist	Title	Types of Collaboration
2005	Makiyo Kawashima (川島茉樹代)	Studio Album, Makiyo	Chorus.
2005	Rene Liu	Studio Album, Heard	Chorus.
2005	Nicholas Tse (謝霆鋒)	Studio Album, Release	Chorus.
2006	Deserts Chang (張懸)	Music Video, Scream	Acting in the music video.
2009	Eason Chan (陳奕迅)	Music Video, "Zhe Yang De Yi Ge Ma Fa" (A Trouble Like This)	Acting in the music video.
2012	Deserts Chang (張懸)	Music Video, "Significant Others" (兩者)	Acting in the music video.
2013	Priscilla Ahn	Music Video, "It Began With A Fallen Leaf"	Acting in the music video.
2018	Wei-Ze Cai (蔡維澤), Yu-Ming Zeng (曾育茗)	"Bi Ci" (彼此, Each Other), a Live performance in the episode 5 of The Coming One 2	Music arrangement.
2018	Wei-Ze Cai (蔡維澤)	"Ni Ma Mei You Gao Su Ni De Shi" (你媽沒有告訴你的事, What Your Mother Never Tells You), a Live performance in the episode 6 of The Coming One 2	Collaborating with Wei Wei for the music and backing vocal arrangement.
2020	Various Artists	"Yi Zhi Dao Li Ming" (一直到黎明, Till The Dawn)	Participating in the cantata for the anti-epidemic song.
2021	Xiao Re Chang (小熱唱)	Music Video, "3 Lovers" (三個愛人)	Acting in the music video.
2021	Hebe Tien / Wu/James Li/JJ Lin/Wei Bird/Shi Shi/Soft Lipa/Wan Fang/E.SO/Wei-Wei Tan/Tracy Su	"2021 Shou Qian Shou" (2021 手牽手, Hand In Hand) Song + Music Vide	Singing and acting in the music video.
2022	Wu / Aurora	"Storm" music video	Singing and acting in the music video with Aurora.

== Concerts ==
- Space In Space Concert Tour (2019–2020)
- 16 Leaves Concert (2020)
- Recto and Verso Concert (2020)

== Host ==
Year	Channel / Platform	Title	Notes
2018	Tencent Video	The Coming One 2	Attending China's talent show as a judge/ advisor known as "Xing Tui Guan".
2019	Hunan Television	Singer 2019	China's talent show
2019	iQIY	The Big Band 1	China's On-Line talent show for music bands

== Filmography ==
Categories	Title	Released Date	Notes	Ref
Micro Film	Zhi You Ke Yi (Only Possible)	September 21, 2012	Commissioned by : Mian Is... Director& Film Editor: Jimmy Cho Assistant Director: Nai Wei Liu Producer: April Lee Director Manager: Claire Hsieh Artist Assistant: Hsiang Huang Make up: Wan-Ting Chang Special Thanks: Jing-Yi Chen, Chicken Rice, Zoom In The theme song and the lyrics of micro film Zhi You Ke Yi (Only Possible) is written by Qing-Feng Artist: Sodagreen Recording and Mixing: Eugene Ke	
Mini-series	The Pond	2021	Qing-Feng played the role of a student in The Pond	

== Publications ==
Title	Released Date	Notes
Tu Yi's Folktales (Auntie Tu's Folktales)	August 7, 2017	The book is a limited edition merch as well as Wu's first creative work, first print and 500 copies only, for his Birthday Concert A Le!! Qian Tian Bu Shi Cai 39 Sui Ma! (What!! Wasn't I Just 39 Years Old The Day Before Yesterday!) and Absurd Photography Exhibition Qi Ji No Yi Shun (The Miraculous Moment).

== Awards and nominations ==
Year	Award	Category	Recipient(s) and nominee(s)	Result
2000	HSNU Tien-Yun (Heavenly Melody)Award	Championship for Composition Category	Peeping	Won
2000	HSNU Tien-Yun (Heavenly Melody)Award	Championship for Solo Singing Category	Singing Tanya Chua's Ji Nian (Remember)	Won
2002	The 19th NCCU Golden Melody	Best Lyricist	Flying Fish	Won
2002	The 19th NCCU Golden Melody	Best Composer	Flying Fish	Won
2007	The 18th Golden Melody Award	Best Lyricist	Little Love Song	Nominated
2007	The 18th Golden Melody Award	Best Lyricist	Little Love Song	Won
2007	2007 HITO Music Awards	2006 HITO Best Lyricist	Little Love Song	Won
2008	The 19th Golden Melody Award	Best Composer	Wu Yu Lun Bi De Mei Li (Incomparable Beauty)	Nominated
2008	The 8th Chinese Music Media Awards	Best Composer	Wu Yu Lun Bi De Mei Li (Incomparable Beauty)	Nominated
2009	The 3rd Freshmusic Awards	Best Duet Song	Bei Yu Shang Tou (Deeply Hurt By The Rain) / Wu, Waa Wei	Won
2009	The 3rd Freshmusic Awards	Best Composer	Dai Wo Zou (Take Me Away) (Artist: Raine Yang)	Nominated
2010	The 21st Golden Melody Award	Best Lyricist	Disappear (Artist: A-mei)	Nominated
2010	The 21st Golden Melody Award	Best Composer	Disappear (Artist: A-mei)	Nominated
2010	The 10th Chinese Music Media Awards	Best Composer	Ta Xia Le Xia Tian(His Summer)	Nominated
2010	The 3rd Freshmusic Awards	Best Lyricist	Ge Zhan Ting Kao (Stop By Stop)	Nominated
2010	The 3rd Freshmusic Awards	Best Composer	Jiao Xiang Meng (Symphonic Dream)	Nominated
2011	The 30th Hong Kong Film Awards	Best Original Film Song	Jian Yu Fu Sheng (also known as Hua)	Nominated
2011	The 22nd Golden Melody Award	Best Lyricist	Once In A Lifetime	Nominated
2011	The 1st Global Hits	Best Lyricist Of The Year	Once In A Lifetime	Won
2011	The 5th Freshmusic Awards	Best Lyricist	Once In A Lifetime	Won
2013	2013 HITO Music Awards	HITO Best Lyricist	My Dear (Artist: Raine Yang)	Won
2013	The 3rd Global Hits	Best Lyricist Of The Year	It's All About Love (Artist: Jam Hsiao)	Won
2013	The 7th Freshmusic Awards	Best Composer	Alzheimer's (Artist: Wan Fang)	Nominated
2014	The 19th China Music Awards	Best Music Producer	—N/a	Won
2015	The 8th Freshmusic Awards	Best Lyrics: Album (The 2nd Place)	Departures (Artist: Karen Mok) / Yiu-Fai Chou、Wu, Hai-Tou Wang, Francis Lee, Kar-Yeung Yee, Albert Leung, Zhen- Yi Chen and Shu Cui	Won
2015	The 8th Freshmusic Awards	Best Composition: Album (The 2nd Place)	Departures (Artist: Karen Mok) / Shilei Chang, Dennis Matkosky, Lee Anna James, Wu, Anthony Lun, Jonathan Wong, Keon Chia, Wei-Che Lin, Jian-Qing Li, Karen Mok and Arai Soichiro	Won
2016	The 27th Golden Melody Award	Best Lyricist	Tong Kuai De Ai Yan (Violently Sad and Beautiful)	Nominated
2016	The 27th Golden Melody Award	Best Lyricist	Ta Ju Qi You Shou Dian Ming (He Raised His Hand to Make a Roll Call)	Won
2016	The 27th Golden Melody Award	Best Composer	Xia Yu De Ye Wan (Rainy Night)	Nominated
2017	The 28th Golden Melody Award	Best Lyricist	Murmur of the Tree Rings (Artists: Raine Yang)	Nominated
2020	The 39th Hong Kong Film Awards	Best Original Film Song	FLY (Various Artists：YoYo Sham) / Ellen Joyce Loo, Wu	Won
2020	2020 HITO Music Awards	HITO Top 10 Chinese Songs of The Year	Spaceman	Won
2020	2020 HITO Music Awards	HITO Best Composer	Boy Zhuangzi	Won
2020	2020 HITO Music Awards	Hit Fm Singer of The Year	Spaceman	Won
2020	2020 HITO Music Awards	HITO Best Male Singer	Spaceman	Won
2020	The 31st Golden Melody Award	Best Male Mandarin Singer	Spaceman	Won
2020	The 31st Golden Melody Award	Best Mandarin Album	Spaceman	Nominated
2020	The 31st Golden Melody Award	The Best Composer	Spaceman	Nominated
2020	The 31st Golden Melody Award	Album of the Year	Spaceman	Nominated
2020	The 13th Freshmusic Awards	Best Male Mandarin Singer	Spaceman	Won
2020	The 13th Freshmusic Awards	Top 10 Albums of The Year	Spaceman	Won
2020	The 13th Freshmusic Awards	Top 10 Singles of The Year	Death of Narcissus	Won
2020	The 20th Southern Music Festival	Mandarin Album of The Year	Spaceman	Nominated
2020	The 20th Southern Music Festival	Mandarin Song of The Year	Qi Feng Le (Song of The Wind)	Nominated
2020	The 20th Southern Music Festival	Best Male Mandarin Singer	Spaceman	Won
2020	The 20th Southern Music Festival	Best Album Producer	Spaceman	Won
2020	The 20th Southern Music Festival	Best Recording	Spaceman	Won
2020	The 20th Southern Music Festival	Artist of The Year	—N/a	Won
2021	Hit FM	Top 10 Albums of The Year	Folio Vol.1：One and One	Won
2021	The 32nd Golden Melody Award	Best Male Mandarin Singer	Folio Vol.1：One and One	Nominated
