= JPM discography =

- Studio albums: 2
- Music videos: 10

Taiwanese Mandopop boyband JPM has released two studio albums as of 2012.

After they had separated from the Lollipop group in 2009, former members Qiu Wang Zi and Liao Xiao Jie had been undergoing a series of secret training. On the day of A Legend Star's first anniversary, the two of them decided to get back together and form a new group called JPM, alongside Qiu Wang Zi's brother, Mao Di, on January 11, 2011. While the two members were part of Lollipop before, Qiu Mao Di was a former member of Choc7 group until 2010.

On August 26, 2011, JPM released Moonwalk album. Their single, Moonwalk features a million-dollar music video in which the boys perform a spectacular "space dance" tailor-made for them by famous Taiwan dance choreographer Terry Lin. Aside from the music video, JPM members also contributed with the making of their album as Liao filled the role of the producer for part of the album, while Qiu Wang Zi is the lyricist of three songs and composer of two songs in the album. In addition with the ten songs listed, the album also includes a Cantonese version of "因為有你" (Because of You). On August 29, three days after its release, the album sales reached more than 50,000 copies. On January 25, JPM released a Japanese version for Moonwalk album. The album consists of Normal Edition and First Press Limited Edition, which comes with a bonus DVD containing five music videos, one-hour music special, and interview footage.

On November 30, JPM released their second studio album entitled 365 under the same label, Sony Music Taiwan. They use "Love" as the main theme of this album. In other words, each song is used to describe different types and stages of love. In addition with the theme of love, 365 album also emphasized the "Golden Triangle" concept to capture each members' individual firm and confidence and also to represent their strong brotherhood. According to Sony Music, JPM said: "We are the Golden triangle, the best ally and best friend" (「我們是黃金鐵三角，是最好的戰友也是最好的朋友」). Demonstrating the trio's mastery of a multitude of music styles, the new album's track list includes an electro-dance K-Pop-styled titular song "365 Days" especially produced by Korean producers. Moreover, the track list also includes a solo song for each member, and a collaboration with Kimberley Chen entitled "Internet". Once again, Liao and Qiu Wang Zi took part in putting the album together as Liao filled the role of the producer for half of the album, lyricist of three songs and the composer of two songs, while Qiu is the lyricist of the main song, 365, of the album.

== Studio albums ==
| Year | # | Information | Track listing |
|---|---|---|---|
| 2011 | 1st | Moonwalk: Chinese: 月球漫步; Pinyin: Yuè Qiú Màn Bù; Release Date: August 26, 2011 (Mandarin ver.) January 25, 2012 (Jap. ver.); Label: Sony Music (Taiwan); Language: Mandarin | Track listing: 1. 月球漫步 (Moonwalk); 2. "因為有你" (Because of You); 3. "喜歡妳好久" (Loved you for a long time - Qiu Mao Di's solo); 4. "平凡的美麗" (Extraordinary Beauty); 5. "那不是雪中紅" (This is not Rose in Snow); 6. "佔為己有" (For Himself - Qiu Wang Zi's solo); 7. "Never Give Up"; 8. "舞可取代" (Dance Can Be Replaced); 9. "愛情 Beautiful" (Love is Beautiful - Liao Xiao Jie's solo); 10. "再一次擁有"; 11. "因為有你(粵語版)" (Because of You (Cantonese Version)) |
| 2012 | 2nd | 365: Chinese: 365 天; Pinyin:365 Tiān; Release Date: November 30, 2012; Label: Sony Music (Taiwan); Language: Mandarin | Track listing: 1. "365 天" (365 days); 2. "相信愛" (Believe Love); 3. "Internet (ft. Kimberley Chen)"; 4. "Crazy For Love" (Qiu Mao Di's solo); 5. "我沒有很想你" (I Don't Miss You That Much); 6. "She Wanna Go"; 7. "愛情的下坡" (The Downhill of Love); 8. "一個人也好" (It is Fine To Be Alone - Qiu Wang Zi's solo); 9. "笑自己" (Laugh At Yourself - Liao Xiao Jie's solo); 10. "Singing 4 Love" |

== Music videos ==
| Year | Song | Album |
|---|---|---|
| 2011 | "月球漫步" (Moonwalk) | Moonwalk |
| 2011 | "那不是雪中紅" (This is not Rose in Snow) | Moonwalk |
| 2011 | "因為有你" (Because of You) | Moonwalk |
| 2011 | "平凡的美麗" | Moonwalk |
| 2011 | "Never Give Up" | Moonwalk |
| 2012 | "365 天" (365 days) | 365 |
| 2012 | "我沒有很想你" (I Don't Miss You That Much) | 365 |
| 2012 | Internet(ft. Kimberley Chen)" | 365 |
| 2012 | "Singing 4 Love" | 365 |
| 2012 | "She Wanna Go" | 365 |

== See also ==
- JPM
- Liao Xiao Jie/Liljay
- Qiu Wang Zi/Prince
- Qiu Mao Di
- Lollipop F
- Choc7
