= Jay Hong =

South Korean singer-songwriter and producer

- Born: Hong Junseok; June 19, 1986 (age 39)
- Occupations: Singer, singer-songwriter, producer
- Years active: 2011–present

Korean name
- Hangul: 홍준석
- RR: Hong Junseok
- MR: Hong Chunsŏk
- Website: OfficialJayHong on Facebook

Jay Hong (born June 19, 1986) is a South Korean singer-songwriter and producer. He debuted as a member of duo named Blue Marble in 2011, and he released his first solo single "Without You" in 2012. "Without You" was included in the South Korean film Don't Cry Mommy. He performed mandatory military service from 2014 to 2015. He produced Taiwanese idol group JPM's 2nd album 365 and became famous for producing "HEART" and "Love Departure" (爱出发) for Chinese idol group TFBoys' debut album.

== Discography ==
=== Blue Marble ===
- 7dayz (2011)

=== Solo albums ===
- Without You (2012)
- My Everything(2013)
- Loving U(2014)
- Sweet Night (Duet with Seo Sae Hee)(2016)
- Trace (Duet with Rampage)(2016)
- Love Warning (Duet with Seo She See) (2017)
- Watchout (Duet with Paul Suh) (2017)

== Production discography ==
- Korean actor Kim Jin-woo – Raining (Feat. Son Hoyoung) (2010)
- Korean actor Kim Jin-woo – Love Latte (Feat. Eugene) (2010)
- MBC television series Road No. 1 OST, 'Kim Jin-woo – Only You' (2010)
- MBC television series Me Too, Flower! OST, 'Seoyeon - Love Is You' (2011)
- Taiwanese idol group JPM 2nd album 365 – '365天 (365 Days)', 'Singing 4 Love' (2012)
- Taiwanese idol group Weather Girls Japan 2nd single – 'キミ予報 (Your Forecast)' (2013)
- Thai idol group Evo Nine 2nd Single "Superman" (2013)
- Chinese idol group TFBoys 1st album – 'HEART', '爱出发 (Love Departure)' (2013)
- SBS television series Only Love OST, Beatwin – 'You're My Everything' (2014)
- Chinese idol group TFBoys 'Love With You' (2015)
- Taiwanese idol group SpeXial 4th album Boyz on Fire – "Another Day" (2016)
- Chinese idol group TFBoys '萤火 (Firefly)' (2016)
- Taiwanese Male Artist Jaydaone 4th Single 'Try Again' (2017)
- Chinese idol group BBF 'Serve Me Right' (2017)
- Taiwanese Male Artist Owodog 1st Album Transform - "My Girl" (2017)
- Korean actor Ryu Si-won Japan EP Smile – '뻔하잖아 (ポンハジャナ)' (2017)
- SETTV television series Iron Ladies (TV series) OST, 'Ben Wu - Wonderful Day' (2018)
- Chinese idol group Mr. Tyger 'All About You' (2018)
- Taiwanese idol group C.T.O 1st album - 'Turn It Up' (2018)
- Chinese idol group Mr.Tyger 1st album - '去未来 (To The Future)' (2018)
- Chinese idol group TFBoys '最好的那年 (The Best Year)' (2018)
