= JPM (band) =

Taiwanese music band

- Born: Taiwan
- Occupations: Singers, Actors, show hosts, Dancers
- Years active: 2011–2015
- Musical career
- Origin: Taiwan
- Genre: Mandopop
- Label: Sony Music
- Members: 廖俊杰/Liljay/Jay 邱胜翊/Prince 邱翊橙/Modi
- Website: JPM at Sony Music

JPM is a Taiwanese Mandopop music band formed under the management of Sony Music company with artists Jay Chou, Leehom Wang, and Vanness Wu. The group debuted on January 11, 2011 with three members: Liljay, Prince, and Mao Di from A Legend Star Entertainment Corp. Two members (Jay and Prince) were originally part of Lollipop until 2009, while Mao Di is from Choc7.

Prior to Mao Di's addition, Jay and Prince released a single entitled Dance Can Be Replaced ("舞可取代") on July 8, 2010. On August 26, 2011, JPM finally released their debut album, Moonwalk which contains ten songs and one Cantonese version of "Because of You".

== Etymology ==
The name of the band is taken from the first letters of each member's names: LilJay, Prince and Modi, forming the band name, JPM.

== History ==
=== 2010: Pre-JPM ===
Former Lollipop members, Qiu Wang Zi and Liao had been undergoing a series of secret training for the past year after they had separated with the band in 2009. On July 8, 2010, the two of them released a single entitled Dance Can Be Replaced ("舞可取代"). On September 10, they had their first concert at the Hong Kong Kowloon Bay International Trade and Exhibition Center to promote their single. In the end, their first single was successful as they received six awards at the end of the year, which includes "Popular Dance Song Award" and "Idol Award" by the "Metro Radio Mandarin Hits Music Awards Presentation", "Best Dance Song Award" and "Idol Award" by the "Seventh Hit Golden King Awards", and "Outstanding Dance Song Singers" and "Network Popular Singers" by the "Chinese Golden Melody Awards".

=== 2011: Moon Walk Debut ===
On the day of A Legend Star Entertainment Corp.'s first anniversary, Liao and Qiu decided to get back together and form a new group called JPM, alongside Qiu's brother, Mao Di, on January 11, 2011. JPM aims for the top idol group in Asia with the release of their highly anticipated debut album. On August 26, 2011, JPM finally released their first album entitled Moonwalk. Their single, Moon Walk features a million-dollar music video in which the boys perform a spectacular "space dance" tailor-made for them by famous Taiwan dance choreographer Terry Lin. Aside from the music video, JPM members also contributed with the making of their album as Liao filled the role of the producer for part of the album, while Qiu Wang Zi is the lyricist of three songs and composer of two songs in the album. In addition with the ten songs listed, the album also includes a Cantonese version of "因為有你" (Because of You). On August 29, three days after its release, the album sales reached more than 50,000 copies. At the end of the year, JPM garnered two awards from the "8th Hit King Golden Awards", and three more in other music awards.

During this year, JPM members are also active in other fields. Liao continued his hosting career. Qiu Wang Zi was cast in two films, and starred in the television series "33 Gu Shi Guan (Fake Chocolate episode)" with Nikki Deng.

=== 2012-present: 365 Album and first concert ===
On January 25, JPM released a Japanese version for Moonwalk album. The album consists of Normal Edition and First Press Limited Edition, which comes with a bonus DVD containing five music videos, one-hour music special, and interview footage.

During the first half of the year, JPM received two awards: "Hito Potential Group" and "Best Newcomer Award" from the 2012 Hito Pop Music Awards and Sprite Billboard Awards respectively, for their Moonwalk debut last year.

On November 30, JPM released their second studio album entitled 365 under the same label, Sony Music Taiwan. They use "Love" as the main theme of this album. In other words, each song is used to describe different types and stages of love. In addition with the theme of love, 365 album also emphasized the "Golden Triangle" concept to capture each members' individual firm and confidence and also to represent their strong brotherhood. According to Sony Music, JPM said: "We are the Golden triangle, the best ally and best friend" (「我們是黃金鐵三角，是最好的戰友也是最好的朋友」). Demonstrating the trio's mastery of a multitude of music styles, the new album's track list includes an electro-dance K-Pop-styled titular song "365 Days" especially produced by Korean producers. Moreover, the track list also includes a solo song for each member, and a collaboration with Kimberley Chen entitled "Internet". Once again, Liao and Qiu Wang Zi took part in putting the album together as Liao filled the role of the producer for half of the album, lyricist of three songs and the composer of two songs, while Qiu is the lyricist of the main song, 365, of the album.

Within the first week of its release, 365 managed to reach top three on the charts. JPM continued to promote their album all over and outside of their area, sometimes including Kimberley Chen with them. They are also invited to be "Red Heart charity spokespersons" not only to publicize their new album, but to do public service to families in need as well, as reported on December 13, 2012.

At the end of the year, JPM received two awards: "Metro Music Best Dance Song" and "Metro Music Awards in Asia jumped to sing Group" from the Metro Music Awards 2012 for their 365 album. To add to their awards list, JPM received eight music awards in the first half of 2013.

In June, it was announced that JPM would have their first concert, "JPM LovEvolution concert tour 2013 Love Evolution Tour" on August 3 at the Taipei ATT SHOW BOX. Because of the extensive preparation, the group even declined seven movie/drama proposals.

== Members ==
Member	Stage Name		Real Name		Birthdate
Member	chinese	pinyin	chinese	pinyin	Birthdate
Liao Xiao Jie/Liljay/Brian	小傑	Xiǎo Jié	廖俊傑	Liào Jùn Jié	25 September 1986 (age 40)
Qiu Wang Zi/Prince	王子	Wáng Zǐ	邱勝翊	Qiū Shèng Yì	14 April 1989 (age 37)
Qiu Mao Di/Modi	毛弟	Máo Dì	邱翊橙	Qiū Yì Chéng	10 October 1990 (age 35)

== Discography ==
Year	Title	Details
2011	Moonwalk (月球漫步)	Release date: August 26, 2011 (Mandarin ver.) January 25, 2012 (Jap. ver.); Label: Sony Music (Taiwan); Format: Studio album; Language: Mandarin
2012	365	Release date: November 30, 2012; Label: Sony Music (Taiwan); Format: Studio album; Language: Mandarin

== Filmography ==
=== Films ===
Year	Title	Original title	Members			Role(s)
Year	Title	Original title	Liao Xiao Jie	Qiu Wang Zi	Qiu Mao Di	Role(s)
2008	Winds of September	九降風			x	謝志昇(阿昇)
2008	Happy Funeral	六樓后座2家屬謝禮	x	x		Cameo
2009	Love in the end	愛到底 (第六號瀏海)		x	x	(No. 3 and 6 bangs boys)
2009	The Great Escape	廖問之越V風雲	x			廖問
2010	Dance Gate 2	精舞門2		x		Wang Zi/Prince
2010	Laugh Travels	嘻游記		x	x	白沙堂 (Baisha Tang); 沙地鼠
2011	Honey Pupu	消失打看		x		可樂
2011	Gokusoku Senpō	極速先鋒		x		林清風
2012		極限衝鋒	x			Liang Wei (梁威)
2013	Young Guns	n/a		x		待定
2014	The Break-Up Artist	分手达人			x	

=== Short films ===
Year	Title	Members			Role(s)
Year	Title	Liao Xiao Jie	Qiu Wang Zi	Qiu Mao Di	Role(s)
2012	以為		x		Wang Zi Yi
2013	愛味男女	x			Tang Yiwei (小傑-唐艾偉)

=== Television series ===
Year	Title	Original title	Members			Role(s)	Network
Year	Title	Original title	Liao Xiao Jie	Qiu Wang Zi	Qiu Mao Di	Role(s)	Network
2007	Sister is Coming (Lollipop idol drama)	棒棒堂偶像劇《姐姐來了》	x	x		Salesperson; 飾 王子	
2007	Brown Sugar Macchiato	黑糖瑪奇朵 (黑糖玛奇朵) (Hei Tang Ma Qi Duo)	x	x		Xiao Jie; Wang Zi	FTV
2007	They Kiss Again	惡作劇2吻 (恶作剧2吻) (O Tso Chu 2 Wen or E Zuo Ju 2 Wen)		x		Ah Nuo	CTV
2007	Love Is Here (Lollipop idol drama)	棒棒堂偶像劇《愛情來了》	x	x		novelist; waiter	
2008	The Legend of Brown Sugar Chivalries	黑糖群俠傳 (黑糖群侠传) (Hei Tang Qun Xia Chuan)	x	x		Ronaldo (ep.13); Linghu Cong	StarTV
2010	Gloomy Salad Days	死神少女 (Si Shen Shao Nu)		x	x	Huang He 黃禾; Ah Pang 阿龐	PTS
2011	33 Gu Shi Guan - Fake Chocolate	假面巧克力 (Jia Mian Qiao Ke Li)		x		Qiu Ke Li	STV
2012	As the Bell Rings	課間好時光一年二班		x		Cameo Ep.1	迪士尼頻道
2012	Ti Amo Chocolate	愛上巧克力 (Ai Shang Qiao Ke Li)		x		Wang Zi Yi 王子翊	SETTV
2012	I Love You So Much	粉愛粉愛你 (Fen Ai Fen Ai Ni)			x	Mao Di 毛弟	CTS
2012	Just Like Small Flowers	像小朵一样		x		JJ	
2013	As the Bell rings 2nd season	課間好時光一年二班(第二季)		x		Cameo	迪士尼頻道
2013	Flavor Lover	愛味男女 (Ai Wei Nan Nu)	x			Tang Ai Wei 唐艾偉	YouTube/Next TV

=== Stage Dramas ===
Year	Title	Original title	Members			Role(s)	Date(s)
Year	Title	Original title	Liao Xiao Jie	Qiu Wang Zi	Qiu Mao Di	Role(s)	Date(s)
2012	Little Red Riding Hood and The Big Bad Wolf	大紅帽與小野狼（劇場版）		x		Wolf	August 29, 2013 to September 1, 2013

== Books ==
- 2011年2月 傳奇星2011寫真記事 - Legendary Star 2011 Photo Calendar

== Awards ==
For individual awards list, see also: Liao Xiao Jie's Awards, Qiu Wang Zi's Awards and Qiu Mao Di's Awards

Year	Category	Award	Reference(s)
2011	8th Hit King Golden Awards	Mandarin Golden Melody Awards - "Because of You"	
2011	8th Hit King Golden Awards	Most Popular Group in Dance Song	
2011	Femina IT Awards	Trend Group Award	
2011	4th Mengniu Sour Yogurt Music Billboard Newcomer Festival	Almighty Portfolio Award	
2011	MTV gods	Male Singer(s) Award of the Year	
2012	Billboard Sprite Super Reds Hall Annual Festival	Best Newcomer Award (Taiwan)	
2012	2012 Hito Pop Music Awards	Hito Potential Groups	
2012	Metro Music Awards 2012	Metro Music Dance Song - "365 days"	
2012	Metro Music Awards 2012	Metro Music Awards in Asia jumped to sing Group	
2013	Authority Oricon	shook the Chinese TOP of dancing and singing groups (trophy)	
2013	Music Pioneer 2012 Awards	Best Premiered Song ("I do not want you")	
2013	Music Pioneer 2012 Awards	Best Group in dancing and singing	
2013	Music Pioneer 2012 Awards	Best Group	
2013	9th Annual Music King Golden Awards	Mandarin Golden Melody Awards - "365 days"	
2013	9th Annual Music King Golden Awards	Best Group - Taiwan	
2013	9th Annual Music King Golden Awards	Network popular Group	
2013	2013 Hito Pop Music Awards	Hito Popular Singer Campus	

== See also ==
- Lollipop (group)
- Choc7
