= Parts Unknown =

Parts Unknown may refer to:

- Parts unknown (wrestling)
- Parts Unknown (Crosbie book), a 2006 poetry book by Lynn Crosbie
- Parts Unknown, a 1938 novel by Frances Parkinson Keyes
- "Parts Unknown", a short story by David Francis (author)
- Parts Unknown (game), a board game by Cheapass Games
- Parts Unknown, a 2001 album by Spectre (musician)
- Parts Unknown, an album by The Hydromatics
- Parts Unknown: Hostile Takeover, a 2000 comic book, illustrated by Nat Jones
- Anthony Bourdain: Parts Unknown, an American travel and food television series

== See also ==
- From Parts Unknown (album) 2014 album by Every Time I Die
- Unknown (disambiguation)
- Part (disambiguation)
