= As the Bell Rings (Taiwanese TV series) =

2012 Taiwanese television series

- 課間好時光 一年二班
- Directed by: Lang Zu-yun
- Starring: Fandy Fan; Ami Yang; Katie Chen; J.C.
- Country of origin: Taiwan
- Original language: Mandarin
- No. of seasons: 2
- No. of episodes: 74

Production
- Running time: 20-25 minutes
- Production company: Disney Channel

Original release
- Network: Disney Channel
- Release: February 6, 2012 – January 6, 2013

As the Bell Rings (Chinese: 課間好時光 1年2班) is the Taiwan adaptation of As the Bell Rings. It is adapted from the original Italian sitcom Quelli dell' Intervallo by Disney Channel Italy and the Chinese adaptation of the same name.

== Characters ==
=== Main cast ===
- Ami Yang as Zhang Jie (張杰)
- Fandy Fan as Ding Liang (丁亮)
- Katie Chen as Hu Die (胡蝶)
- J.C. as Yang Fan (羊帆)

=== Supporting cast ===
- Hsiao Chih-wei as Li Qi (李奇)
- Liu Guo-shao as Zhu Zihao (朱子豪)
- Beatrice Fang as Di Di (狄笛)
- An-chi as Wen Shanshan (文杉杉)
- Orange as Dinosaur girl (恐龍妹)
- Yang Zong-hua as Principal (校長)
- Hsu Chun-keng as Teacher Ai (艾老師, season 2)
- Zhang Ya-lan as Queen (女王, season 2)

=== Guest ===
- Wang Zi as Lo Mi-ou (Romeo, 羅米歐)
- Evonne Hsu as Hsu Yi-fan (許伊凡)

== See also ==
- As the Bell Rings
