= List of Gloomy Salad Days episodes =

This is a list of the episodes for the drama Gloomy Salad Days.

== Episodes ==
- Episode 1: Huang He 黃禾
- Episode 2: Xiao Qing 筱青

Huang He is every teacher's favourite student because he is a top scorer in the school. He is from a wealthy family, but in reality, he is the head of all gangsters and bullies in his school. Having two identities, he is highly respected and feared by all the other students in the school. Huang He had a student-teacher love relationship with Jiang Ping, his Science teacher. When Jiang Ping accidentally got pregnant with Huang He's child, she divorced with her husband. To protect his bright future, he called for the help of Death Girl to take the child away from his life. When a pretty and intelligent girl, Xiao Qing defeated him in a debate competition, she caught his attention. To get closer to Xiao Qing, Huang He set a trap on Sha Dong, Xiao Qing's brother. When Xiao Qing's secret admirer, Ah Pang get to know about Huang He's evil plan, he calls for the help of Death Girl to get rid of Huang He as he thought Huang He had violated Xiao Qing. Only after Huang He's death did Ah Pang realise that he has to pay the price which is to leave his beloved grandmother. However, Death Girl did not change him into a rock in the end and he leaves the black rock on the seat of Huang He.

- Episode 3: Xiao Lin Pt. 1 小琳[上]
- Episode 4: Xiao Lin Pt. 2 小琳[下]

It's the beginning of the second semester. Xiao Lin is a new student who was transferred to Shen Qi's class. She is very quiet as her parents are undergoing divorce and she hates the idea of thinking that her parents do not want her. From the seating arrangement, Xiao Lin took the place that previously belonged to Huang He and found the mysterious black rock on her seat. She took the stone and kept it. It is New Year. Xiao Lin went back to her uncle and aunt's home. Both of them are busy with the grocery store so they did not have time to take care of Xiao Lin. One night, her aunt tries to call Xiao Lin to have dinner but she deliberately ignores it, thinking about their ignorance, and stays upstairs despite her hunger. At midnight, she quietly goes downstairs to the grocery store. Xiao Lin takes a can of beer and a total amount of TWD1,000 from the cashier counter and runs away. She goes to a river nearby and sees Ah Jie graffiting "Jedem das Seine". Xiao Lin told Ah Jie that she had seen the Death Girl. The next day, Xiao Lin went back to the grocery store. Xiao Lin's actions yesterday were recorded by the CCTV. Xiao Lin's uncle was enraged and told her that nobody wants her anymore. Xiao Lin could not believe that because she really loves her parents. She did not eat or drink, thinking that this would force her parents to pick her home from the dormitory. Xiao Lin subsequently called upon Death Girl to bring her parents to accompany her when she turns into a rock of Nai He Bridge. That night, Xiao Lin died due to starvation. Also, in this story, Death Girl realised Shen Qi is the only one that can see her with or without the black rock.

- Episode 5: Ni Ke 妮可
- Episode 6: Xiao Tang 小唐

After Xiao Lin gave all her belongings (notebook and black stone) to Ni Ke just like what she have promised, Ni Ke continued to post articles in their blog about death. After Ni Ke broke up with Ah Cai, she goes to the hotel everyday to get more business. She hope that one day she can earn enough money to bring her mother to Taipei. She doesn't want to live with her dad who loves gambling and gets himself drunk everyday when he come home. Xiao Tang is one of the best student in Ni Ke's class. He wants to help Ni Ke but he always gets rejected by her. Xiao Tang was curious and decided to secretly follow Ni Ke but was shocked to find out that Ni Ke works as a prostitute. Ni Ke calls for Death Girl's help for her dad to disappear from the family's life and he soon died. Ni Ke slowly develop feelings for Xiao Tang and promised to let Xiao Tang give her tuition and give up being a prostitute after she and her mom moves to Taipei while Xiao Tang goes to university at Taipei. Ni Ke threw the black rock out of the window in the end and left for Taipei for a better life.

- Episode 7: Li You 李優
- Episode 8: Ah Guo 阿國

Li You is a transfer student viewing the school. As he walked pass a tree, he chanced upon the black rock on the ground, previously thrown out of the window by Ni Ke and kept it as his lucky rock. When Li You and Ah Guo, captain of the basketball team, were hanging out at the basketball court after they won a match, Li You told Ah Guo about his secret - he was the illegitimate child of the uprising politician. Both swore each other to secrecy but unfortunately, Mei Li, their classmate, was eavesdropping on them. Mei Li forced Li You to allow her to view his private dorm and found out that Li You was actually a girl. On the other hand, Li You had confessed to Xiao Ju, Ah Guo's sister, about liking her and her real identity as girl, and they decided to be together without Ah Guo knowing it. Upon knowing it, Mei Li was furious and threatened Li You with his secrets to force him to break up with Xiao Ju and be with her. In the end, Mei Li decided to expose all of Li You's secrets in school in an attempt to get back at Li You. Ah Guo was very angry, as he thought that Li You was cheating on Xiao Ju. Li You and Ah Guo challenged each other to a fight at the sports hall. Shen Qi knew that something bad was going to happen so he followed Xiao Ju to the sports center. After the fight, Li You and Ah Guo managed to get over their conflict. Du did not bring anyone away this time. Before she left, she told Shen Qi that he can see her without the help of the rock because he has something in his brain. Before leaving the school at the end, Li You told Ah Guo that they will meet in the university and to always keep in touch. Li You left the black rock in Xiao Ju's possession.

- Episode 9: Xiao Ju 小菊
- Episode 10: Qiao Qiao 巧巧

A new semester has begun. Ah Guo has graduated whereas Xiao Ju is still in high school. Xiao Ju spends most of her time with Qiao Qiao and her love towards Li You gets more bland by the day. Due to a bad encounter during Qiao Qiao's English speech, Qiao Qiao's mother requested for Xiao Dao and Pei Pei to be transferred out of Qiao Qiao's class so as not to affect her studies. Thus, Xiao Dao became very mad at Qiao Qiao as the teacher ordered him to transfer class again. At the same time, Shen Qi has been searching for the location of the black rock and while he went to look for Xiao Ju, he got hit by Xiao Dao while crossing the road and was sent to the hospital. After this incident, Xiao Dao realised that Qiao Qiao has been speaking up for him and made peace with her. After spending most of the time together, Qiao Qiao and Xiao Ju fell in love. Li You came all the way from Taipei with Ah Guo to visit Xiao Ju, only to become upset by the news that Xiao Ju had a change of heart. After Qiao Qiao argued with her mother, Xiao Ju and Qiao Qiao ran away to the south part of Taiwan and the news of them missing were reported everywhere. Their lesbian relationship were known to everyone right after the pictures of them kissing that were posted on Qiao Qiao's blog were revealed. Shen Qi wanted to find Xiao Ju to get back the black rock so he went to southern part of Taiwan with the help of Xiao Dao. Right after Xiao Ju found out Li You committed suicide, she ran to the beach with Qiao Qiao and called for the Death Girl to bring them away. At the end, Xiao Ju and Qiao Qiao both committed suicide. When Shen Qi and Xiao Dao arrived, Shen Qi found the black rock but was too late to save them.

- Episode 11: Xiao Dao 小刀
- Episode 12: Li Qiang 李强

At the start of the episode, Xiao Dao garnered much attention after an incident with a reporter and went to work for Kou San. Li Qiang, Xiao Dao's best friend since childhood, secretly crushes Pei Pei and changed his scooter to a cool motorcycle as he wanted to ferry Pei Pei, who wanted to sit on a red motorcycle. Pei Pei and Li Qiang's relationship became better and they finally got together. Xiao Dao got chased out of the hospital room while visiting Shen Qi by Shen Qi's father's assistant, in which he placed the black rock into Xiao Dao's bag by accident. After leaving the hospital, Xiao Dao went straight to Pei Pei's house to pass her the birthday present he bought, only to discover that Pei Pei had lied to him in order to go out with Li Qiang instead. Xiao Dao became very mad and confronts Li Qiang. On the other hand, Li Qiang's father requested for Li Qiang to return the motorcycle as they cannot afford it. As a result, Li Qiang requested to break up with Pei Pei. Li Qiang's father attempted suicide after his pears were not accepted by the authority board. Xiao Dao was sent to disinfect a well by pouring a mysterious bottle in by Kou San, and Li Qiang realised the bottle might be detergent with a high pH value as the wells of the village he lives in are interlinked and recently tested poison positive. Xiao Dao decides to betray Kou San when he knew that what he poured was poison but was discovered. Kou San threatens to burn down his uncle's shop if he does not return by the next morning to apologise. To prevent Kou San from harming more people, Xiao Dao calls for Death Girl's help to kill Kou Sang. With that, Xiao Dao rammed his bike into Kou Sang's car and both died. At the end, Pei Pei managed to open a motorbike club at school and left the black rock in the room as a display.

- Episode 13: Xiao Lun 小侖
- Episode 14: Da Dong 大東

Xiao Lun has feminine looks and loves nail painting. He has a good friend of girls, but due to his feminine personality, is often bullied by Da Dong, and being extorted. However, due to Xiao Lun's grandmother not earning much, Xiao Lun was unable to pay Da Dong a couple of times. Da Dong forced the girls to pay for Xiao Lun, as Xiao Lun has helped them to paint their nails many times for free. One day, after being badly bullied by Da Dong, he escaped into the Motorcycle Club room, and suddenly a voice broke out: "Do you want to become a Stone?" Xiao Lun, being kind-hearted, said that although Da Dong treated him horribly, he didn't want to wish Da Dong dead. The next day, the disciplinary master forced Xiao Lun to punch Da Dong as a form of training, in hope that Xiao Lun would learn to be more manly. Xiao Lun, however, asked him why punish him and force him to hit Da Dong when Da Dong was the one who should be punished. Da Dong was then beaten up by the disciplinary master until Xiao Lun's form teacher stopped him. On Da Dong's gang leader's birthday, Da Dong requested to be given a more serious mission, and got injured during the mission. Xiao Lun coincidentally met him and treated his wounds. Da Dong's heart began to soften. Xiao Lun lent him a jacket to avoid being caught, and Da Dong happened to find the rock from Nai he Bridge in the pocket. He returned both the jacket and the rock, and thanked Xiao Lun. They then worked together on a musical, as the teacher thought they would be on better terms through that. On the day of the musical itself, Shen Qi finds out that Xiao Lun has the rock, but was unable to do anything. Xiao Lun was later pushed to go into the haunted house which Da Dong and his friend set up. After being kissed by Da Dong in the haunted house, Xiao Lun confronted Da Dong, saying that Da Dong was like him - a gay. Da Dong got upset and he attacked Xiao Lun. Da Dong then saw the Death Girl and told her as long as Xiao Lun doesn't wake up, his secret that he was gay would forever be a secret, and being a stone wouldn't matter. Shen Qi rushes in, but it was too late. Xiao Lun ended up in a coma, and Da Dong visited him, sobbing and begging Death Girl to bring Xiao Lun back as he regretted his rash words. Xiao Lun's grandmother, hearing Da Dong's cries, entered the room and told Da Dong she didn't blame him. On hearing all the commotion, Xiao Lun awakes from his coma. Xiao Lun, Da Dong and Shen Qi then buries the rock at the old school grounds. Shen Qi then spoke to the Death Girl after Xiao Lun and Da Dong left. The Death Girl questioned him if he thought by burying the rock she would disappear. He said that he was in fact happy that she didn't vanish (as he likes her), but had no choice but to bury the rock to prevent people, who couldn't get over their troubles, to be taken away by her.

- Episode 15: Ya Zhen 亞貞
- Episode 16: Shen Quan 沈泉

Shen Qi's brother came to Shi Yu to become a teacher. He was a senior and had a remarkable love story in the previous campus of Shi Yu. While working in Shi Yu, all he thought about was Ruo Yao, his previous girlfriend who had already died. He suffered from depression and often planted flowers which his girlfriend liked to relieve his depression. All went about normally until one day, he found the black stone buried by Shen Qi while gardening. Ya Zhen's parents have high expectations of her in her studies and because of this, Ya Zhen feels pressurized. She longs for a colourful life and thrill outside school, and together with her boyfriend, she began playing truant, drinking alcohol and even had sex with him. Shen Quan came to her class to become an English teacher. She gradually fell in love with him, and worked hard to be better in English just to impress him. Just after she left her previous boyfriend, her parents finds out that she is pregnant. In her desperation, she pushed all the responsibility to Shen Quan, and he was fired by the school. Shen Quan, faced with the Death Girl, aggravates Shen Qi's headaches and Shen Qi nosebleeds and faints. Shen Qi later begged the Death Girl to leave his brother alone, but was held back by the hospital doctor and nurses and his father, who thought he was hallucinating and becoming mad. Shen Quan then got the Death Girl to let him be with his dead girlfriend for eternity, and commits suicide by jumping off the old school building. Shen Qi, who got injected with anaesthetic, wakes up and sneaks out of the hospital, only to find that Death Girl has already taken his brother away. He tries attacking Death Girl, saying he wants her to vanish, in his grief, but to no avail.

- Episode 17: 杜荷 Du He
- Episode 18: 高超 Gao Chao

Due to his guilt for wanting Du to disappear, Shen Qi decided to find out Du's past, and found the hand drawn manga in the library. He then visited the old campus' Manga Club room and found a full version of the comic titled Death Girl and was able to find out what happened to the manga's artist Du He and her boyfriend, Gao Chao, a story which happened five years ago. In preparation for a manga competition, Gao Chao gradually develops feelings for his competitor, Du He and even exchanged his better work with a worse one, so as to increase the chance of Du He's Manga "Death Girl" to be able to win the first prize. Du He was also moved by what Gao Chao has done for her. After Gao Chao found out that he also had a chance to go to Japan, he wanted to go together with Du He and even asked her to marry him.

- Episode 19: 渡 Du
- Episode 20: 沈奇 Shen Qi

After knowing that Du is actually Du He, Shen Qi decided to find out where she is. On the other hand, Shen Qi's father, who found out that Shen Qi had a brain tumor, wanted Shen Qi to quickly undergo a surgery and had become stricter to Shen Qi due to his brother's sudden death. Shen Qi doesn't want a surgery as it will make him unable to see Du and ran away from the hospital at night to his uncle's house at the countryside. After series of events happened, he finally too, found out, that his mother's sickness had worsened. In the end, Shen Qi underwent the operation. Du He, on the other hand, woke up from her coma and her soul returned to her human body. They later met again and ended up together.
