= Unknown film =

Unknown film may refer to

- Unknown (2006 film), crime thriller starring James Caviezel
- Unknown (2011 film), thriller starring Liam Neeson
- A lost film

== See also ==
- Unknown (disambiguation)#Film
