= The Great Unknown =

The Great Unknown or Great Unknown may refer to:

== Film and television ==
- The Great Unknown (1913 film), by Oscar A. C. Lund
- The Great Unknown (1924 film) (Die große Unbekannte), a German silent film directed by Willi Wolff
- The Great Unknown (1927 film) (Die große Unbekannte), a German silent film directed by Manfred Noa
- "The Great Unknown" (Key West), a television episode
- "The Great Unknown" (Rugrats), a television episode
- The Great Unknown: The Journey is Starting, an animated film directed by Jaiden Chivunga

== Music ==
=== Albums ===
- The Great Unknown (Logan album) or the title song, 2010
- The Great Unknown (Rob Thomas album) or the title song, 2015
- The Great Unknown (Sarah Geronimo album) or the title song (see below), 2015
- The Great Unknown, by Deanna Bogart, 1998
- The Great Unknown, by Koxbox, 2000

=== Songs ===
- "The Great Unknown" (song), by Sarah Geronimo, 2016
- "The Great Unknown", by Anekdoten from A Time of Day
- "The Great Unknown", by Bob Evans from Suburban Songbook
- "The Great Unknown", by Dar Williams from The Honesty Room
- "The Great Unknown", by Disillusion from The Liberation
- "The Great Unknown", by Elvis Costello from Goodbye Cruel World
- "The Great Unknown", by Enter Shikari from Nothing Is True & Everything Is Possible
- "The Great Unknown", by Evermore from Real Life
- "The Great Unknown", by the Ghost Inside from Get What You Give
- "The Great Unknown", by Harry Manx from West Eats Meet
- "The Great Unknown", by Iron Maiden from The Book of Souls
- "The Great Unknown", by Jukebox the Ghost from Jukebox the Ghost
- "The Great Unknown", by Sara Evans from No Place That Far
- "The Great Unknown", by Travis, a B-side of the single "Closer"
- "Great Unknown", by Little River Band from Monsoon

== Other uses ==
- The Great Unknown, a force venerated by some factions in Dungeons and Dragons
- Sir Walter Scott (1771–1832), British poet and novelist, was known by this name

== See also ==
- The Unknown (disambiguation)
