= Ti Amo Chocolate =

- Promotional poster
- 愛上巧克力
- Genre: Romance; Comedy
- Written by: Ye Fengying; Shao Huiting 林珮瑜 蘆葦; Zheng Yingmin
- Directed by: Danny Dun
- Starring: Vanness Wu; Joanne Tseng; Wang Zi; Hsueh Shih-ling; Michael Zhang
- Opening theme: "Undefeated" (不敗) by Vanness Wu and Junho
- Ending theme: "途中" (Tu Zhong) by Jane Huang
- Country of origin: Taiwan
- Original language: Mandarin
- No. of series: 1
- No. of episodes: 80

Production
- Production location: Taiwan
- Running time: 60 minutes
- Production companies: Sanlih E-Television; Taiwan Mobile Production

Original release
- Network: SETTV
- Release: 10 April – 30 July 2012

Related
- Inborn Pair; Sweet Sweet Bodyguard

Ti Amo Chocolate (Chinese: 愛上巧克力) is a 2012 Taiwanese romantic-comedy television series. The television drama was produced by Sanlih E-Television and Taiwan Mobile Production, starring Vanness Wu and Joanne Tseng. It also stars Michael Zhang, Wang Zi, Hsueh Shih-ling, Kuo Shu-yao, and Dou Zhi Kong. The shooting started on February 12, 2012. It was first aired on April 10, 2012 on SETTV. It ended its run on July 30, 2012.

Ge Wei Ru was nominated for the Best Supporting Actress award at the 47th Golden Bell Awards.

== Synopsis ==
Fang Jia Hua (Vanness Wu) is the successor of his family's business. However, his dream is to open a chocolate store and be a chocolatier in the hope of finding his long lost mother. He ends up leaving his business and his family to fulfill his dream. Hong Xi En (Joanne Tseng) is someone who spent her days slogging and taking up part-time work for her family. One day, she ends up working with Fang Jia Hua in "Ti Amo Chocolate" shop, and above all, she has to dress herself as a man for the job.

== Cast ==
=== Main cast ===
- Vanness Wu as Fang Jia Hua
- Joanne Tseng as Hong Xi En
- Michael Zhang as Fang Jia Rui
- Hsueh Shih-ling as Wei Li
- Prince Chiu as Wang Zi Yi

=== Extended cast ===
- Ah Ben as Hong Xi Ping
- Bu Xue Liang as Su Yi Cheng
- Kuo Shu-yao as Hong Xi Hui
- Dou Zhi Kong as Lu Zheng Ting
- Lene Lai as Lu Zheng Jun
- Ge Wei Ru as Ge Jia Yi
- Jian Chang as Hong Zhong Xin
- Doris Kuang as Ye Mei Ren
- Shen Meng Sheng as Fang Pei Long
- Zhou Dan Wei as Li Ru Yun
- Angie Tang as Fang Lin Wen Yue
- Chung Hsin-ling as Su Xiao Xiao
- Zhao Shun as Flower store owner
- Chien Te-men as Fortune teller
- Na Wei Xun as Bakery store manager

=== Guest cast ===
- Lung Shao-hua as Cocoa master

== Broadcast ==
Network	Country/Location	Airing Date	Timeslot
SETTV	Taiwan	April 10, 2012	Mondays to Fridays, 10pm
東森綜合台	Taiwan	April 10, 2012	9:00pm (until June 26); 10:00pm (June 27 onwards)
J2	Hong Kong	July 10, 2012	Mondays to Fridays, 7:30pm
星和都會台	Singapore	July 20, 2012	Mondays to Fridays, 7:00pm
MBC	South Korea	September 10, 2012	Mondays to Fridays, 12:00am
Astro	Malaysia	December 27, 2012	Mondays to Fridays, 6:30pm

== Soundtrack ==
Ti Amo Chocolate

Soundtrack album by Various Artists
- Released: May 25, 2012
- Genre: Mandopop
- Language: Mandarin
- Label: Universal Music (TW)

Ti Amo Chocolate Original Soundtrack (愛上巧克力 電視原聲帶) was released on May 25, 2012 by various artists under Universal Music Taiwan. It contains twelve songs, which includes the collaboration of Lee Jun-ho from 2PM and Vanness Wu. The opening theme song is "不敗" or "Undefeatable" by Lee Jun-ho and Vanness Wu, while the ending theme song is by Jane Huang entitled "Tu Zhong" or "En Route".

=== Track listing ===
No.	Title	Lyrics	Music	Singer	Length
1.	"Undefeated" (不敗（片頭）)	余琛懋	唐達	Vanness Wu and Lee Jun-ho from 2PM	03:40
2.	"En Route" (途中（片尾）)	陳信延	李治逸	Jane Huang	04:02
3.	"Start Today" (今天開始)	陳詠謙	Paul Drew, Greig Watts, Pete Barringer, Chris Wortley	Vanness Wu	04:12
4.	"Extras" (臨時演員)	Hsueh Shih-ling, 葛大為	Hsueh Shih-ling	Hsueh Shih-ling	03:43
5.	"Will You?" (你會不會)	李焯雄	宇珩	Fish Leong	03:57
6.	"Tiny Ants" (小小螞蟻)	易家揚	方大同	Will Pan	03:48
7.	"Love Chain" (愛鍊)	陳天佑	蘇亦承	Jane Huang	04:22
8.	"Love Me?" (愛不愛我)	Hsueh Shih-ling	阿弟仔	Da Mouth	03:43
9.	"Lover Friend" (情人知己)	鄔裕康, 鄭淑妃	趙倩	Rachel Liang	04:31
10.	"Rainbow live ver." (彩虹(Live版))	Wu Bai	Wu Bai	Wu Bai	03:53
11.	"Not Part of My Tears" (不屬於我的淚)	Eric Suen	Eric Suen	Eric Suen	04:59
12.	"Us" (我們)	馬嵩惟	左安安	Rachel Liang	05:07
Total length:					47:17

== Ratings ==
Ti Amo Chocolate ranked sixth in its pilot episode, which is also the lowest average rating of the series. However, it gradually goes up between third and fifth spots, with a total average of 1.87. The viewers survey was conducted by AGB Nielsen.

SETTV Ratings

Airing Date	Episode	Average Rating (cable only)	Average Rating (with wireless)	Weekly Average	Rank	Remarks
April 10, 2012	1	2.13	1.79	1.48	5	東森綜合台晚三立都會台一小時首播
April 11, 2012	2		1.37	1.48	5	
April 12, 2012	3		1.38	1.48	5	
April 13, 2012	4		1.37	1.48	5	
April 16, 2012	5			1.58	5	
April 17, 2012	6			1.58	5	
April 18, 2012	7			1.58	5	
April 19, 2012	8			1.58	5	
April 20, 2012	9		1.47	1.58	5	
April 23, 2012	10	2.29	1.93	1.73	4	收視率首度打敗無線三台八點檔
April 24, 2012	11			1.73	4	
April 25, 2012	12			1.73	4	
April 26, 2012	13			1.73	4	
April 27, 2012	14			1.73	4	
April 30, 2012	15			1.66	5	
May 1, 2012	16			1.66	5	
May 2, 2012	17			1.66	5	
May 3, 2012	18			1.66	5	
May 4, 2012	19			1.66	5	
May 5, 2012	20			1.72	5	
May 8, 2012	21			1.72	5	
May 9, 2012	22			1.72	5	
May 10, 2012	23	1.87		1.72	5	
May 11, 2012	24			1.72	5	因21:00-22:00播出《七俠五義人間道》 本劇不適合九點檔
May 14, 2012	25			1.80	4	
May 15, 2012	26			1.80	4	
May 16, 2012	27			1.80	4	
May 17, 2012	28			1.80	4	
May 18, 2012	29			1.80	4	
May 21, 2012	30			1.78	4	
May 22, 2012	31	2.40	2.02	1.78	4	
May 23, 2012	32			1.78	4	
May 24, 2012	33			1.78	4	
May 25, 2012	34			1.78	4	
May 28, 2012	35			1.93	3	
May 29, 2012	36			1.93	3	
May 30, 2012	37	2.38		1.93	3	
May 31, 2012	38			1.93	3	
June 1, 2012	39			1.93	3	
June 4, 2012	40			1.78	3	
June 5, 2012	41			1.78	3	
June 6, 2012	42			1.78	3	
June 7, 2012	43			1.78	3	
June 8, 2012	44		1.71	1.78	3	
June 11, 2012	45			2.20	3	
June 12, 2012	46			2.20	3	
June 13, 2012	47			2.20	3	
June 14, 2012	48			2.20	3	
June 15, 2012	49			2.20	3	
June 16, 2012	50			1.98	3	
June 19, 2012	51			1.98	3	
June 20, 2012	52			1.98	3	
June 21, 2012	53			1.98	3	
June 22, 2012	54			1.98	3	
June 25, 2012	55			1.85	3	
June 26, 2012	56			1.85	3	
June 27, 2012	57			1.85	3	broadcast changed the time to 10:00pm starting this day
June 28, 2012	58			1.85	3	
June 29, 2012	59		2.12	1.85	3	
July 2, 2012	60			1.71	4	
July 3, 2012	61			1.71	4	
July 4, 2012	62			1.71	4	
July 5, 2012	63			1.71	4	
July 6, 2012	64		1.40	1.71	4	
July 9, 2012	65			1.73	4	
July 10, 2012	66			1.73	4	
July 11, 2012	67			1.73	4	
July 12, 2012	68			1.73	4	
July 13, 2012	69			1.73	4	
July 16, 2012	70			1.81	6	
July 17, 2012	71		1.82	1.81	6	
July 18, 2012	72		1.88	1.81	6	
July 19, 2012	73		1.75	1.81	6	
July 20, 2012	74			1.81	6	
July 23, 2012	75			2.20	4	
July 24, 2012	76			2.20	4	
July 25, 2012	77		2.25	2.20	4	
July 26, 2012	78		2.33	2.20	4	
July 27, 2012	79		2.02	2.20	4	
July 30, 2012	80		2.85	2.85	4	
Total Average		-	-	1.87		

== Awards and nominations ==
Year	Award Ceremony	Category	Nominee	Result
2012	47th Golden Bell Awards	Best Supporting Actress in a Television Series	Ge Wei Ru	Nominated
2012	2012 Sanlih Drama Awards	Best Green Leaf Award	Chung Hsin-Ling	Won
2012	2012 Sanlih Drama Awards	Most Popular Overseas Award	Vanness Wu	Won
