= Serena Fang =

Taiwanese actress and model

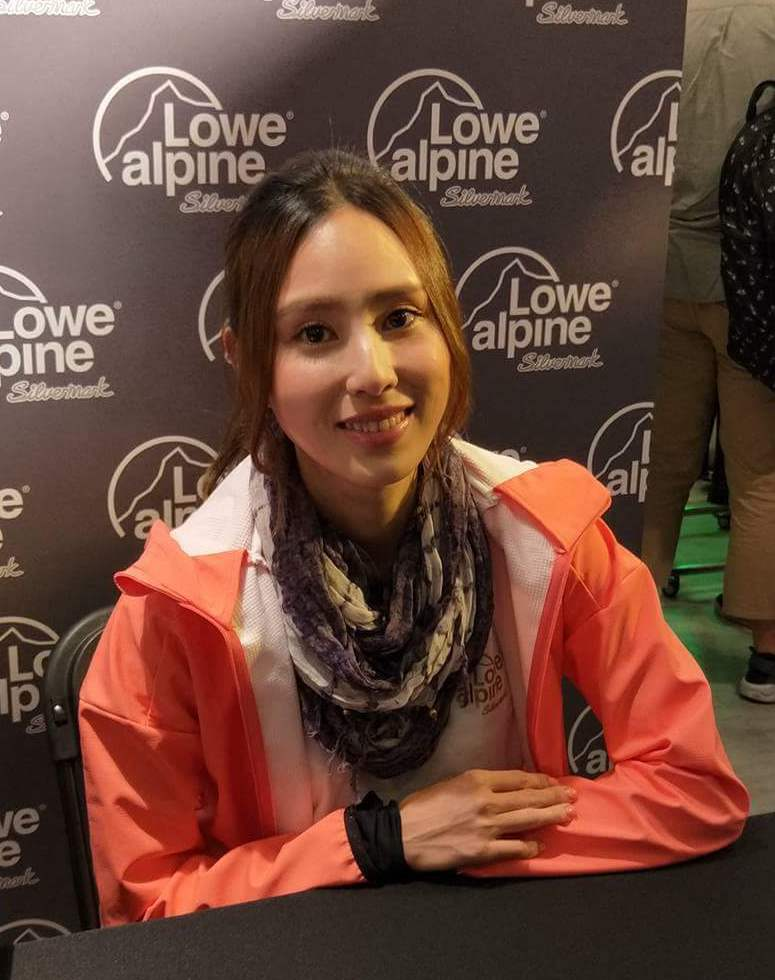
- Born: 31 March 1984 (age 40); Taiwan
- Occupation(s): Actress, model
- Years active: 2004–present

Chinese name
- Traditional Chinese: 房思瑜
Transcriptions
Standard Mandarin
- Hanyu Pinyin: Fáng Sīyú
- Musical career
- Also known as: Rena Fang; Fang Siyu

Serena Fang (Chinese: 房思瑜; pinyin: Fáng Sīyú) is a Taiwanese actress and model.

== Filmography ==
=== Television series ===
Year	Title	Role
2019	CSIC 2	
2018	Security Officers	
2018	Iron Ladies	Jhang Yi-Yi
2016	The King of Romance	Shen Yi-Le
2015	Be with You	Yang Xin Ru
2013	Family Love	Xu Youai
2013	Love for All the Moments	
2011	Ring Ring Bell	
2010	Gloomy Salad Days	Du He
2010	Summer's Desire	Jiang Zhen En
2006	The Young Girl Succeeds Records	Lai Jing Wen
2006	The Kid From Heaven	Su Xiao Man
2005	Wind Warrior	Fang Yin Yin
2004	Ping Pong	Li Zi

=== Film ===
Year	Title	Role
2012	The Siege of Rabaul	
2012	The Southern Storm	
2012	Bang Bang Formosa	
2011	Goodbye May	
2010	Tears	純純
2009	Old Time Photo Studio	
2008	Drifting Flowers	菁菁

=== Music video ===
Year	Artist	Song title
2009	Li Wei	愛到壞
2009	Ding Shao Hua	只是朋友
2009	Jack Jin	笨蛋
2008	Will Pan	轉機
2007	Guang Liang	不會分離
2006	Edison Chen	Angel
2005	Leon Lai	有情郎
