= Unknown =

Unknown or The Unknown may refer to:

== Film and television ==
=== Film ===
- The Unknown (1915 comedy film), Australian silent film
- The Unknown (1915 drama film), American silent drama film
- The Unknown (1927 film), a silent horror film starring Lon Chaney
- The Unknown (1936 film), a German drama film
- The Unknown (1946 film), a mystery film
- The Unknown (1964 film), a Polish war film
- Anjaane: The Unknown, a 2005 Bollywood horror movie
- The Unknown, a 2005 action/thriller starring Miles O'Keeffe
- Unknown (2006 film), a thriller starring James Caviezel
- Unknown (2011 film), a thriller starring Liam Neeson
- The Unknown (2026 film), a French psychological fantasy film
- Unknowns (Desconocidas), a 2022 film by Venezuelan director Luis Fernández

=== TV ===
- Unknown (TV series), a 2024 Taiwanese television series
- Het Onbekende (Dutch for: The Unknown), a Dutch television show
- Unknown, a 2024 web series starring Chris Chiu
- "The Unknown" (Star Wars: The Clone Wars), a 2014 episode of the TV series

== Literature ==
- Unknown (magazine), an American pulp fantasy fiction magazine published from 1939 to 1943
- The Unknown, a 1998 book in the Animorphs series by K. A. Applegate
- The Unknown (hypertext novel), a 1999 web-based hypertext novel written by William Gillespie, Scott Rettberg and Dirk Stratton with Frank Marquardt
- The Unknown (1963 anthology), an anthology of fantasy fiction short stories edited by D. R. Bensen and illustrated by Edd Cartier
- The Unknown, a comic book mini-series by Mark Waid

== Music ==
- The Unknown (Madeline Juno album) (2014)
- Unknown (album), a 2015 album by Rasputina
- The Unknown (The Vision Bleak album) (2016)
- The Unknown, a 2014 album by Dillon
- "The Unknown" (song), by 10 Years, 2019
- "The Unknown", a song by Crossfade from Crossfade, 2004
- "The Unknown (Strength)", a song by In Hearts Wake from Divination, 2012
- "The Unknown", a song by Imagine Dragons from the deluxe edition of Smoke + Mirrors, 2015
- "The Unknown", a song by Shadows Fall from Fire from the Sky, 2012
- "Unknown", a song by Reks from The Greatest X, 2016

== Science and mathematics ==
- Unknown (mathematics), a variable that appears in an equation for which a solution is sought
- Unknown, the ongoing answer to an open problem

== Video games ==
- Unknown (video game) or Amnesia: The Dark Descent, a 2010 video game
- Unknown (Tekken), a character in Tekken

== Other uses ==
- "The Unknown" (Over the Garden Wall), an episode of Over the Garden Wall
  - The Unknown, a location in Over the Garden Wall
- The Unknown, a character in Willy's Chocolate Experience
- The Unknown, a sculpture by Kenny Hunter
- Unknown, a Unicode script
- The Unknowns, a self-proclaimed ethical hacking group

== People ==
- Unknown Hinson (born 1954), musician and performer
- The Unknown Comic (born 1945), Canadian actor and comedian
- The Unknown DJ, American disc jockey and record producer
- Unknown T (born 1998), British rapper

== See also ==
- The Great Unknown (disambiguation)
- L'Inconnue de la Seine (died c. 1880), unidentified young woman whose death mask was the model for the CPR doll Resusci Anne
- Unknown known
- Unknown Soldier (disambiguation)
- Unown, a Pokémon species
