= 365 (album) =

- 365 cover

Studio album by JPM
- Released: 30 November 2012
- Genre: Mandopop
- Length: 35:06
- Language: Mandarin
- Label: Sony Music (Taiwan)

JPM chronology
Moonwalk (2011)	365 (2012)

Singles from 365
- 1. "365 天" Released: November 29, 2012; 2. "我沒有很想你 (I Don't Miss You That Much)" Released: December 17, 2012; 3. "Internet(ft. Kimberley Chen)" Released: January 7, 2013; 4. "Singing 4 Love" Released: January 16, 2013; 5. "She Wanna Go" Released: February 6, 2013

Music video
- "365 Days" on YouTube "I Don't Miss You That Much" on YouTube "Internet" on YouTube "Singing 4 Love" on YouTube "She Wanna Go" on YouTube

365 (Chinese: 365 天) is Taiwanese Mandopop trio boyband JPM's second studio Mandarin album. It was first released on 30 November 2012 by Sony Music (Taiwan).

== Album ==
The album was released a year after the first album Moonwalk (Chinese: 月球漫步). They use "Love" as the main theme of this album. In other words, each song is used to describe different types and stages of love. In addition with the theme of love, 365 album also emphasized the "Golden Triangle" concept to capture each members' individual firm and confidence and also to represent their strong brotherhood. Demonstrating the trio's mastery of a multitude of music styles, the new album's track list includes an electro-dance K-Pop-styled titular song "365 Days" especially produced by Korean producers Jay & Taemu. Moreover, the track list also includes a solo song for each member, and a collaboration with Kimberley Chen entitled "Internet". Once again, Liao Xiao Jie and Qiu Wang Zi took part in putting the album together as Liao filled the role of the producer for half of the album, lyricist of three songs and the composer of two songs, while Qiu is the lyricist of the main song, 365, of the album. The five main songs of the album are "365 days (Chinese: 365天)", "I Don't Miss You That Much (Chinese: 我沒有很想你)", "Internet", "Singing 4 Love" and "She Wanna Go".

== Track listing ==
No.	Title	Lyrics	Music	Length
1.	"365 天" (First main song)	邱勝翊（王子）(Qiu Wang Zi)	TAEMU aka Kang Byeong-Jun/Jay aka Hong Jun-Seok	3:18
2.	"相信愛" (Believe Love)	廖俊傑（小傑）(Liao Xiao Jie)	廖俊傑（小傑）(Liao Xiao Jie) 梁永泰 王知音	4:24
3.	"Internet(ft. Kimberley Chen)" (Third main song)	廖俊傑（小傑）(Liao Xiao Jie) 張活寧 趙心蕾	梁永泰 王知音	3:44
4.	"Crazy For Love" (邱翊橙（毛弟）(Qiu Mao Di)'s solo song)	陳熙 吳易緯	陳熙	3:18
5.	"我沒有很想你" (Second main song)	郭文翰	郭文翰	4:18
6.	"She Wanna Go"	張活寧	Skot Suyama 陶山	3:35
7.	"愛情的下坡" (The Downhill of Love)	張蔚然	何官錠	3:32
8.	"一個人也好" (邱勝翊（王子）(Qiu Wang Zi)'s solo song)	游政豪	游政豪	3:33
9.	"笑自己" (廖俊傑（小傑）(Liao Xiao Jie)'s solo song)	廖俊傑（小傑）(Liao Xiao Jie) 郭葦盷	梁永泰	4:02
10.	"Singing 4 Love" (Forth main song)	鄭關雨	TAEMU aka Kang Byeong-Jun/Jay aka Hong Jun-Seok	3:36
Total length:				35:06

== Music videos ==
- 365 天
- "我沒有很想你" (I Don't Miss You That Much)
- "Internet(ft. Kimberley Chen)"
- "Singing 4 Love"
- "She Wanna Go"
