= Prince Chiu =

Taiwanese singer and actor

- 王子
- Born: Chiu Shengyi (邱勝翊); 14 April 1989 (age 37); Taichung City, Taiwan
- Other names: Wang Zi, 操阿粿大師
- Education: Southeast University
- Occupations: Singer, actor, songwriter, television presenter, dancer
- Years active: 2006 – present
- Partner: Stephy Tang (2018–2021)
- Family: Mao Di aka Chris Chiu(brother)
- Musical career
- Also known as: Wang Zi
- Genre: Mandopop
- Instruments: Vocals; piano
- Labels: Star International (2006); Gold Typhoon (formerly EMI Music) (2006-2009); Taiwan Sony Music Entertainment (2011-2014); A Legend Star Entertainment Corp. (2010-2015); HIM International Music (2015-2020)

Chinese name
- Traditional Chinese: 邱勝翊
- Simplified Chinese: 邱胜翊
Transcriptions
Standard Mandarin
- Hanyu Pinyin: Qiū Shèngyì
Yue: Cantonese
- Jyutping: Jau1 Sing3 Jik6
Southern Min
- Hokkien POJ: Khu Sèng-e̍k

Wang Zi
- Chinese: 王子
Transcriptions
Standard Mandarin
- Hanyu Pinyin: Wáng Zǐ
Yue: Cantonese
- Jyutping: Wong4 Zi2
Southern Min
- Hokkien POJ: Ông-chú
- Website: JPM at Sony Music

Prince Chiu (born 14 April 1989) is a Taiwanese singer, actor, model, and television host. He is a member of a trio boyband, JPM, with Liao Xiao Jie/Liljay and his younger brother, Mao Di.

He is a former member of Lollipop, a Taiwanese Mandopop boyband, which consisted of six other members: Zhuang Ao Quan/Owodog, Liao Xiao Jie/Liljay, Yang Xiao Yu/Fabien, Liao Wei Lian/William, and Liu A-wei. They were all selected from Channel [V] Taiwan's reality show Bang Bang Tang (BBT 模范棒棒堂), which sought to create new male artists in the Taiwanese entertainment business.

Lollipop signed their contracts under Gold Typhoon (formerly EMI Capitol) and Channel [V] Taiwan in 2006. However, their contracts with Channel [V] Taiwan terminated at the end of 2009. From 2010-2015, Chiu worked with A Legend Star Entertainment Corp., a company founded by the former Channel [V] Taiwan director, Andy Chang. From 2015 onwards, he signed under HIM International Music.

== Early life ==
Chiu was born in Taichung City, Taiwan on April 14, 1989. His younger brother, Mao Di, was a former member of Choc7, and is currently one of Chiu's co-members in JPM, a mandopop band under Sony Music Taiwan. He attended Zhuangjing Senior Vocational School, where he graduated high school. After graduating, he continued studying English at Hsing Wu University. He later transferred to Tungnan University.

== Career ==
=== Pre-debut ===
Chiu was a bright student throughout his academic life. He participated in various extracurriculars, ranging from sports to school clubs.

In middle school, he joined Taiwan's track and field team and placed 9th in a 100-meter race. He also learned Taekwondo, which he achieved a red belt in.

His stage name Prince (or Wang Zi) was coined by Andy Zhang, the former Channel [V]'s director, when he took the role of a prince in a Shakespearean play in high school. When he first entered the entertainment industry, Zhang suggested the name Prince to Chiu because he thought the name was both catchy and easy to remember.

=== 2006: Formation of Lollipop ===
In 2006, Chiu attended the Bang Bang Tang audition (BBT) in Taipei and was selected to be in the "Bang Bang Tang" variety show. On November 27, the six members of the boy group Lollipop were revealed. Chiu was the second member to be revealed, after Liao Xiao Jie. Lollipop officially signed a contract with EMI Capitol on December 2, 2006, and on December 9, 2006, the group performed publicly for the first time.

=== 2007–08: Acting, Hosting, and Music debut ===
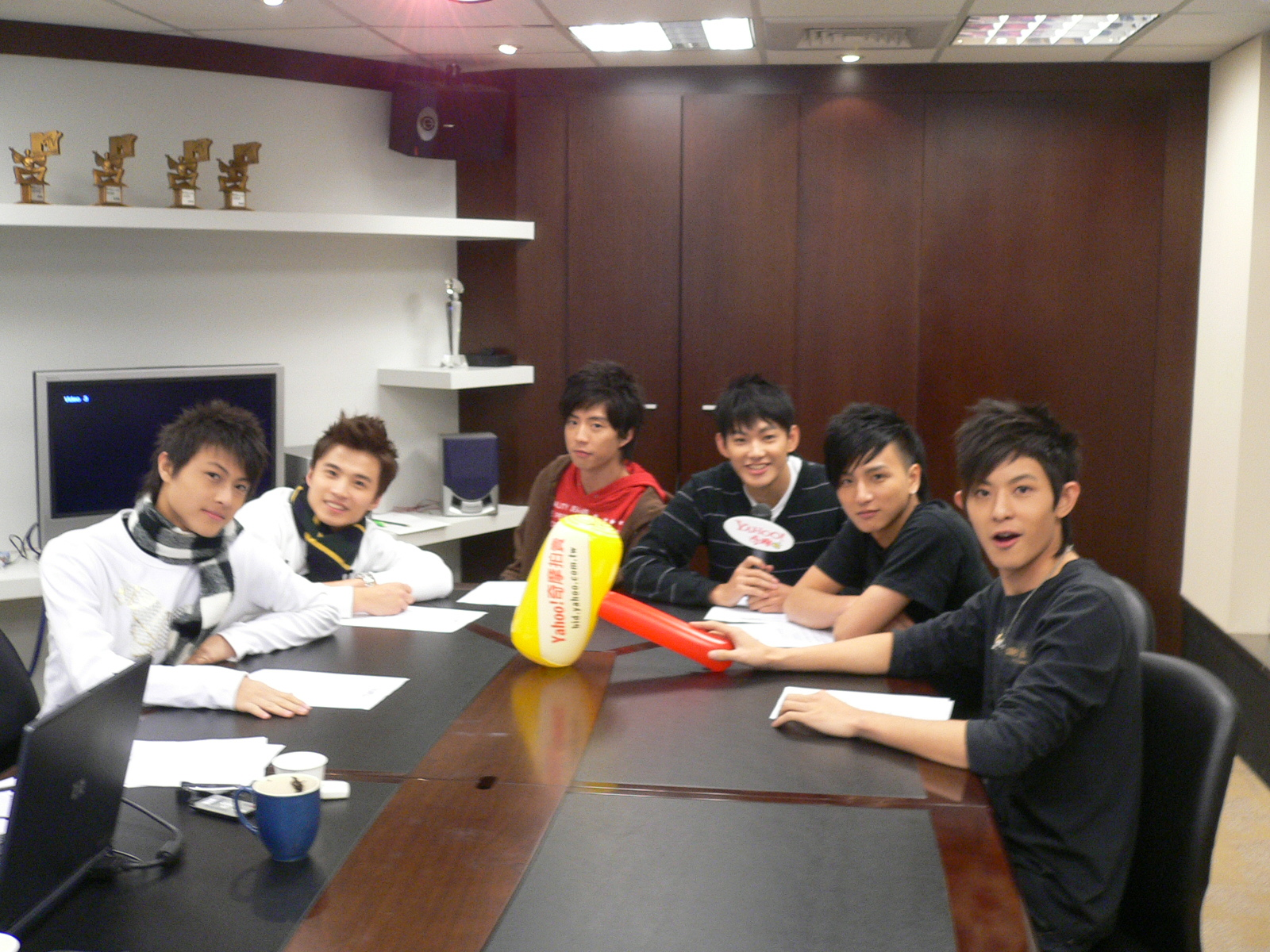
Lollipop with six members in 2007

Lollipop's first EP, Colorful Lollipop was released on January 26, 2007, with six different covers, each featuring a member of the group. Four months later, on May 25, a second EP titled Summer's First Experience was released along with a photobook compiled with photos taken in Okinawa, as well as a DVD. Lyrics were written by Qiu and himself for the song "Summer's First Experience."

During the summer of 2007, Chiu and the other members of Lollipop made their acting debut in the drama Brown Sugar Macchiato, a collaboration with Hey Girl. The first episode was aired in Taiwan on July 15, 2007. Later, Lollipop admits on Kangxi Lai Le that the drama had been more of an introduction of the two groups instead of a major acting challenge, as the members were told to act like themselves, and that many subplots were explained only briefly due to the large number of main characters. After thirteen episodes, the drama ended on October 7, 2007. They released an official soundtrack, then, with songs from Lollipop and Hey Girl. The said television drama allowed Chiu to receive the Best Onscreen Couple with Gui Gui(Emma Wu), a member of Hey Girl.

Chiu also starred in the drama They Kiss Again as the older Ah Nuo (阿諾) or Nobu.

On September 26, 2007, Lollipop visited Hong Kong to promote their television soundtrack Brown Sugar Macchiato. This was their first overseas promotional activity ever since their debut, and a huge fan turnout caused a great commotion at the shopping mall where they were having their autograph session At the same year, Lollipop began hosting their own show Lollipop Gyashan (LOLLIPOP哪裡怕) on October 27 until April 19, 2008, when the show stopped airing.

Lollipop's debut album Gyashan (哪裡怕) was released on December 28, 2007. Gyashan entered Mandarin charts in the number one position, outselling F4's album Waiting for You – Await Your Love (在這裡等你) which was released on the same day. Liao contributed lyrics to three of the ten songs in this album. On January 26, 2008, a year after the release of their first EP, Lollipop held its debut concert at the Taipei Arena. The concert DVD was released on June 6, 2008, breaking chart records with sales rates of more than 35%. The DVD has topped the charts for a period of one month since.

=== 2008–09: Graduation from BBT, I Am Legend Album, tours and Acting ===
Lollipop had been appearing regularly on Bang Bang Tang since August 14, 2006. With Channel [V]'s decision to select a new batch of boys and create a second season, Lollipop and most of the other members "graduated" from Bang Bang Tang after their last performances as members of the show. Their last official episode aired on August 29, 2008, marking the end of the first season. In total, the members of Lollipop had participated in more than 500 episodes of the show.

After graduation from Bang Bang Tang television show, Chiu had been busy filming The Legend of Brown Sugar Chivalries. He was cast as the main lead, Linghu Cong (令狐聰), with Albee Hwang from July 26 to October 18, 2008. On October 3, 2008, the original soundtrack was released by Gold Typhoon. In this album, Chiu wrote and sang the ending song for the series entitled Sorry (對不起 Dui Bu Qi). Two editions were released for the soundtrack, one being a 10,000 limited edition.

On December 6, 2008, Lollipop performed four songs with themes of wushu at the 45th Golden Horse Awards ceremony.

In 2009, Lollipop made its first lyric contributions to other artists, which are included in the mini album of the group Choc7, composed of seven members selected from the same show. Chiu wrote Too Young(太青春) and I'm Stupid(我太笨).

Lollipop's second album I am Legend was released on June 19, 2009. Chiu contributed the lyrics to three songs in the album. A concert tour in Asia with the same name commenced in Hong Kong Coliseum on July 4–5, 2009. While promoting I am Legend on several Taiwanese variety shows, including Kangxi Lai Le, 100% Entertainment, Azio Superstar, etc., Lollipop created a series of dance performances specifically for the show hosts of each show, thus completing a mini TV tour.

Aside from music career, he has also starred on his first film entitled Love (愛到底 - 第六號瀏海) with his brother, Mao Di.

Chiu lived with the other members of Lollipop from 2006 to 2009. Due to disturbances caused by fans gathering outside their apartment, Lollipop had to move several times since their debut and had once lived in an apartment rented to them by BBT show host Fan Fan in Taipei. However, at the end of 2009, Chiu has moved away from Lollipop's apartment and is now living with Liao Xiao Jie and Qiu Mao Di.

=== 2010–11: A Legend Star contract & Formation of JPM ===
Lollipop's artist management contract with Channel [V] Taiwan ended at the end of 2009. Former Lollipop members, Liao and himself had been undergoing a series of secret training for the past year after they had separated with the band in 2009. On July 8, 2010, the two of them released a single entitled Dance Can Be Replaced ("舞可取代"). On September 10, they had their first concert at the Hong Kong Kowloon Bay International Trade and Exhibition Center to promote their single. In the end, their first single was successful as they received six awards at the end of the year, which includes "Popular Dance Song Award" and "Idol Award" by the "Metro Radio Mandarin Hits Music Awards Presentation", "Best Dance Song Award" and "Idol Award" by the "Seventh Hit Golden King Awards", and "Outstanding Dance Song Singers" and "Network Popular Singers" by the "Chinese Golden Melody Awards".

On the day of A Legend Star Entertainment Corp.'s first anniversary, Chiu and Liao Xiao Jie decided to get back together and formed a new group called JPM, alongside Chiu's brother, Mao Di, on January 11, 2011. They signed a contract under A Legend Star Entertainment Corp., a company founded by former Channel [V] Taiwan director, Andy Chang. On August 26, 2011, JPM finally released their first album entitled Moonwalk. In this album, Chiu contributed to the lyrics of three songs and composer of two songs.

Besides his music career, Chiu has also been active in acting. He had 3 films in 2010 (Kung Fu Hip Hop 2, Honey PuPu, and Xi You Ji). Moreover, he was also cast in Gloomy Salad Days in 2010, and 33 Gu Shi Guan - Fake Chocolate in 2011 as the male lead, Qiu Ke Li.

Chiu, together with his brother, Mao Di, were also invited to join into ambassadors in the 2010 Asian Games, Guangzhou Asian Games Volunteer Hall of Fame. With their positive public image and work attitude, youthful joy and personal charm, they became the Guangzhou Asian Games volunteer spokesperson.

=== 2012–present ===
On January 25, JPM released a Japanese version for Moonwalk album. The album consists of Normal Edition and First Press Limited Edition, which comes with a bonus DVD containing five music videos, one-hour music special, and interview footage.

On November 30, JPM released their second studio album entitled 365 under the same label, Sony Music Taiwan. They use "Love" as the main theme of this album. In other words, each song is used to describe different types and stages of love. In addition with the theme of love, 365 album also emphasized the "Golden Triangle" concept to capture each members' individual firm and confidence and also to represent their strong brotherhood. According to Sony Music, JPM said: "We are the Golden triangle, the best ally and best friend" (「我們是黃金鐵三角，是最好的戰友也是最好的朋友」). Demonstrating the trio's mastery of a multitude of music styles, the new album's track list includes an electro-dance K-Pop-styled titular song "365 Days" especially produced by Korean producers. Moreover, the track list also includes a solo song for each member, and a collaboration with Kimberley Chen entitled "Internet". Once again, Qiu contributed to the album as he is the lyricist of its main song, 365 days.

In August 2013, Chiu was also cast in Little Red Riding Hood and The Big Bad Wolf stage drama as "the wolf". On 22 December 2013, he launched his own fashion brand, P.STAR.

In 2017, he acted as the male lead for TV drama Attention, Love!. On 24 November 2017, Chiu released his first solo EP titled ATTENTION!.

== Discography ==
=== Solo songs from JPM ===
- "佔為己有" (For Himself) - from Moonwalk (album)
- "一個人也好" (It is Fine To Be Alone) - from 365 (album)

=== Soundtrack contributions ===
- 2008: "對不起 Dui Bu Qi" (I'm Sorry) - from The Legend of Brown Sugar Chivalries OST
- 2010: "如果可以早一點 Rú Guǒ Kěyǐ zǎo yīdiǎn" (If a little earlier) - from Kung Fu Hip Hop 2 (精舞門2) OST with Chen Bo Lin and Zhou Qiqi

=== Singles ===
Year	#	Information
2010	1st	Dance Can Be Replaced with Liao Xiao Jie: Chinese: 舞可取代; Pinyin: Wǔ kě qǔ dài; Released: 8 July 2010; Label: Sony Music Taiwan

=== EP ===
Year	#	Information	Track listing
2017	1st	ATTENTION!: Release Date: 24 November 2017; Label: HIM International Music; Language: Mandarin	1. "上位" (Uprising); 2. "愛上了妳" (Love at First Sight); 3. "我怎麼可能與妳無關" (How Can We Be Irrelevant)

=== Music compositions ===
Year	Song	Details	Contribution
2007	"Great First Experience (夏日初體驗)"	Album:Summer's First Experience (夏日初體驗) Album; Release Date: 31 May 2007; Singer(s): Lollipop	lyrics
2008	"Sorry (對不起)"	Album:The Legend of Brown Sugar Chivalries; Release Date: 6 October 2008; Singer(s): Qiu Wang Zi	lyrics
2009	"Too Young (太青春)"	Album:Too Young; Release Date: 29 May 2009; Singer(s): Choc7	lyrics
2009	"I'm Dumb (我太笨)"	Album:Too Young; Release Date: 29 May 2009; Singer(s): Choc7	lyrics
2009	"I Am Legend (我是傳奇)"	Album:I Am Legend; Release Date: 9 June 2009; Singer(s): Lollipop	lyrics
2009	"Noisy Silence (吵鬧的沉默)"	Album:I Am Legend; Release Date: 9 June 2009; Singer(s): Lollipop	lyrics
2009	"Tell Me (說說)"	Album:I Am Legend; Release Date: 9 June 2009; Singer(s): Lollipop	song and lyrics
2011	"Don't Wake Up (不醒來)"	Album:Honey Pupu OST (消失打看電影原聲帶); Release Date: 9 May 2011; Singer(s): Kenneth Chang (張午午)	lyrics
2011	"因為有你" (Because of You)	Album:Moonwalk; Release Date: 26 August 2011; Singer(s): JPM	lyrics
2011	"喜歡妳好久" (Loved you for a long time)	Album:Moonwalk; Release Date: 26 August 2011; Singer(s): JPM	lyrics
2011	Never Give Up	Album:Moonwalk; Release Date: 26 August 2011; Singer(s): JPM	lyrics
2011	"再一次擁有"	Album:Moonwalk; Release Date: 26 August 2011; Singer(s): JPM	song and lyrics
2012	"365"	Album:365; Release Date: 30 November 2012; Singer(s): JPM	lyrics

== Filmography ==
=== Television series ===
Years	English title	Original title	Role
2007	"Sister is Coming" (Lollipop idol drama)	棒棒堂偶像劇《姐姐來了	
2007	Brown Sugar Macchiato	黑糖瑪奇朵 (黑糖玛奇朵)	Wang Zi/Prince
2007	"Love Is Here" (Lollipop idol drama)	棒棒堂偶像劇 《愛情來了》	Waiter
2007	They Kiss Again	惡作劇2吻 (恶作剧2吻) (O Tso Chu 2 Wen or E Zuo Ju 2 Wen)	Ah Nuo
2008	The Legend of Brown Sugar Chivalries	黑糖群俠傳 (黑糖群侠传)	Linghu Cong
2010	Gloomy Salad Days	死神少女	Huang He
2011	33 Gu Shi Guan - Fake Chocolate	假面巧克力	Qiu Ke Li
2012	As the Bell Rings	課間好時光一年二班	Cameo (Ep.1)
2012	Ti Amo Chocolate	愛上巧克力	Wang Zi Yi
2012	Just Like Small Flowers	像小朵一样	JJ
2013	As the Bell Rings 2nd season	課間好時光一年二班(第二季)	Romeo, Cameo
2015	The Wife's Lies	妻子的谎言	Li Dong Xu
2016	The Lover's Lies	爱人的谎言	Xiang Yang
2017	Attention, Love!	稍息立正我愛你	Li Zheng
2020	Amensalism	覆活	Cheng You Kuan

=== Film ===
Year	English title	Original title	Role
2008	Happy Funeral	六樓后座2家屬謝禮	Cameo
2009	Love in the End	愛到底(第六號瀏海)	No. 6 boy
2010	Kung Fu Hip Hop 2	精舞門2	Wang Zi/Prince
2010	Laugh Travels	嘻游記	Bai Shatang
2011	Honey Pupu	消失打看	Kele
2011		極速先鋒	Lin Qingfeng
2013	Young Guns		
2018	Graduation Trip	畢業旅行笑翻天	Wang Wei
2018	Surrender to Naive Girl	向天真的女生投降	Peng Wei
2018	Senior	學長	Qin Zining

=== Short film ===
Year	Title	Role
2012	以為	Wang Zi Yi

=== Music video appearances ===
Year	Song title	Artist(s)	Album
2007	咕嘰咕嘰 (Whisper, Mutter, Grumble)	Stephanie Sun	逆光 (Backlight)
2008	I'm Sorry	Qiu himself	The Legend of Brown Sugar Chivalries OST
2010	Dance can be replaced	Qiu and Liao Xiao Jie	Dance can be replaced single
2011	不想Say Goodbye	Circus	啥貨？！CIRCUS

=== Theater ===
Year	English title	Original title	Role	Date(s)
2013	Little Red Riding Hood and The Big Bad Wolf	大紅帽與小野狼(劇場版)	Wolf	August 29, 2013 to September 1, 2013

=== Television hosting ===
Title	Channel	Date
Gyashan Lollipop	Channel V Taiwan	October 27, 2007 to April 19, 2008
"我愛男子漢"	超視	January 6, 2012 to April 7, 2012
"给力男子漢"	四川衛視	September 22, 2012

== Books ==
- 2011年2月 傳奇星2011寫真記事 - Legendary Star Memo 2011

== Awards and nominations ==
For Lollipop and JPM awards list, see also: Lollipop Awards and JPM Awards

Year	Category	Award	Reference(s)
2007	與鬼鬼獲得最佳螢幕情侣 黑糖瑪奇朵	Best onscreen couple (with Gui Gui) in Brown Sugar Macchiato	
2008	Yes! Magazine 2008 Annual (Yes!Magazine 2008年度最夢幻男情人(台中)(第二名)(王子))	Top Dream Lover Boy - 2nd place	
2010	(2010台灣無名小站花美男第一名)	Taiwan Flower Boy Wretch - 1st Place	
2010	"Metro Radio Mandarin Hits Music Awards Presentation" (新城國語力頒獎禮)	Popular Dance Song Award for Dance Can Be Replaced (with Liao Xiao Jie)	
2010	"Metro Radio Mandarin Hits Music Awards Presentation" (新城國語力頒獎禮)	Idol Award (with Liao Xiao Jie)	
2010	Seventh Hit Golden King Awards (第七屆勁歌王金曲金榜)	Best Dance Song Award for Dance Can Be Replaced (with Liao Xiao Jie)	
2010	Seventh Hit Golden King Awards (第七屆勁歌王金曲金榜)	Idol Award (with Liao Xiao Jie)	
2010	Chinese Golden Melody Awards (華語金曲獎)	Outstanding Dance Song Singers (with Liao Xiao Jie)	
2010	Chinese Golden Melody Awards (華語金曲獎)	Network Popular Singers (with Liao Xiao Jie)	
2011	2011年 閃亮之星	Shining Star	
2016	Golden Ticket Award (金票根頒獎典禮)	Spotlight Nova Award	
