= Unknown (TV series) =

2024 Taiwanese boys' love television series

- 關於未知的我們
- Genre: Boys' love
- Based on: Big Brother (大哥) by Priest
- Written by: Tsai Fei-chiao; Hsiao Yi-wei
- Directed by: Chiang Jui-chih
- Starring: Chris Chiu; Huang Hung-hsuan; Lin Si-ting; Kim Jae-hoon
- Opening theme: "Unknown" by Chris Chiu feat. Kim Jae-hoon
- Ending theme: "Geek" (怪咖) by Hong Wei-zhe
- Country of origin: Taiwan
- Original language: Mandarin
- No. of episodes: 12

Production
- Producers: Pan Hsin-hui; Wong Man; Zhang Ying
- Production location: Taiwan
- Running time: 25–37 minutes
- Production company: Interesting International Media

Original release
- Network: Youku

Unknown (Chinese: 關於未知的我們) is a 2024 Taiwanese boys' love television series starring Chris Chiu and Huang Hung-hsuan. It is adapted from the novel Big Brother (大哥) by Chinese author Priest. It is the fourth BL project from the same team behind We Best Love: No. 1 For You, We Best Love: Fighting Mr. 2nd and My Tooth Your Love.

The series aired from 24 February to 20 April 2024 on Youku and Viki (worldwide) and YouTube (Taiwan).

== Synopsis ==
Wei Qian (Chris Chiu) lost his parents at a young age and was forced to raise his younger sister Wei Li-li (Lin Si-ting) on his own. One day, he rescues a boy from an orphanage, Wei Zhi-yuan (Huang Hung-hsuan), and brings him home, raising him as a brother. Years later, Wei Qian has become the founder and general manager of a gaming company, while Wei Zhi-yuan has grown into a young man who secretly harbors romantic feelings for his adoptive brother. The series follows their complicated relationship as they navigate family obligations, societal expectations, and their own desires.

== Cast ==
=== Main ===
- Chris Chiu (Chiu Yu-chen) as Wei Qian
- Huang Hung-hsuan as Wei Zhi-yuan (Xiao Yuan)
- Lin Si-ting as Wei Li-li (Xiao Bao)
- Kim Jae-hoon as Tan Yu (San Pang)

=== Special appearances ===
- Liang Cheng-chun as Xiong Da-fang (Lao Xiong)
- Yang Tzu-i as Wang Jun-le (Le Ge)
- Chang Kai-yi as A Hu
- Liang Hsiang-hua as Feng Ning
- Lin Yun-hsi as Lin Dai-ling
- Lin Tzu-hung as Lin Zu-yuan
- Chiu Sheng-i as Qiu Qian

=== Supporting ===
- Chao Po-yu as Noodle shop owner / A Long
- Lung San as Pool hall colleague / middle school classmate
- Chen Yin-kuei as Pool hall owner
- Hsiung Chun, Liu Hsiang-chi, Shih Chieh-jui, Huang Yu-chi as Le Ge's men
- Liu Yi-sheng, Hsin Li as Wei Qian's university classmates
- Lin Yu-hsin, Chi Wen-chieh, Tsao Hsin-yu, Yang Kai-fan as blind date women
- Chou Tzu-yang as Photography club college student
- Li Wei as Client boss
- Lai Wei-chung, Hsieh Yi-lun as Client's subordinates
- Chou Chien-yu, Lin Yu as H.O.T. male colleagues
- Kuan Ho as H.O.T. female colleague
- Chu Tien-yu as BEAUTY male colleague
- Cheng Chia-i, Chen Li-ting as BEAUTY female colleagues
- Lei Kuo-hsuan as young Xiao Bao
- Yang Chi-yin as BTS signing footage
- Lin Li-yang as Boxing opponent
- Shao Lin as Boxing referee

== Episodes ==
Episode	Title (Opening)	Title (Ending)	Original air date
1	"I Want to Go Home with You"	"The First Kind of Family: They Never Abandon You"	24 February 2024
2	"Who Owes Us?"	"The Second Kind of Family: They Always Leave a Light On Waiting"	24 February 2024
3	"If We Throw It Away, Will It Be Less Tiring?"	"The Third Kind of Family: They Always Make You Want to Stay"	2 March 2024
4	"Can It Be Like This Forever?"	"The Fourth Kind of Family: They're Always There When You Turn Around"	9 March 2024
5	"Is Longing a Habit or Destiny?"	"The Fifth Kind of Family: They're Too Good to Let Go"	16 March 2024
6	"If You Forget to Say Goodbye, Can We Meet Again?"	"The Sixth Kind of Family: They Pretend to Be Strong and Never Say Goodbye"	23 March 2024
7	"Return to the Place Where We Belong"	"The Seventh Kind of Family: They Wait in the Distance, Never Leaving"	30 March 2024
8	"The Distance Between Us and Love"	"The Eighth Kind of Family: They Care in Their Own Way"	6 April 2024
9	"The Day Before the End of the World"	"The Ninth Kind of Family: They Protect You When Doomsday Comes"	13 April 2024
10	"Scars of Hurt"	"The Tenth Kind of Family: They're So Hurt They Want to Throw You Away and Ignore You"	20 April 2024
11	"Only by Accepting the Regret of Missing Out Can We Amplify the Shock of Courage"	"The Eleventh Kind of Family: They Indulge You Unconditionally Because They Like You So Much"	20 April 2024
12	"Us"	"The Twelfth Kind of Family: Never to Be Separated for Life"	20 April 2024

== Soundtrack ==
No.	Title	Lyrics	Music	Artist	Length
1.	"Unknown" (Opening theme)	Kim Jae-hoon	Kim Jae-hoon	Chris Chiu feat. Kim Jae-hoon	3:33
2.	"Geek (怪咖)" (Ending theme)	Chang Chieh, Chen Chiung-chen	Chang Chieh	Hong Wei-zhe	5:05
3.	"Unknown of Us (未知的我們)" (Insert song)	Kim Jae-hoon	Kim Jae-hoon	Kim Jae-hoon	4:20
4.	"When I Miss You (我想你的時候)" (Insert song)	Chiu Chien-hao, Tsai Fei-chiao	Chiu Chien-hao	Huang Hung-hsuan	4:21
5.	"The Most Beautiful Existence (最美好的存在)" (Insert song)	Fang Wen-liang	Fang Wen-liang	Chu Yu-ching	3:07
6.	"How Silly You Are (你有多傻)" (Insert song)	Roger Yo, Liu Yi-erh	Roger Yo	Liu Yi-erh	3:45
7.	"How Silly You Are (你有多傻) (duet version)" (Insert song)	Roger Yo, Liu Yi-erh, Tung Hsin, Chen Ching-fei	Roger Yo	Chris Chiu, Huang Hung-hsuan	3:43
8.	"but I" (Insert song)	Kelly Pan, Roger Yo, Tung Hsin	Roger Yo	Roger Yo	3:42
9.	"If We Are Destined to Be a Movie (若我們註定是場電影)" (Insert song)	Chen Ching-fei	Roger Yo, Chen Ching-fei	Chen Ching-fei	3:28
10.	"My Heart Is Dancing (我心在跳舞)" (Insert song)		Chang Hsuan
11.	"I Don't Really Miss You (我沒有很想你)" (Insert song)	Kerk Hock Han	Kerk Hock Han	Kerk Hock Han	4:47

== Events ==
A press conference was held on 23 February 2024, attended by the main cast as well as special guests Yang Tzu-i, Liang Cheng-chun, Chang Kai-yi and Liang Hsiang-hua.

A fan meeting was held on 21 April 2024 at Legacy Taipei, with the four main actors along with Yang Tzu-i and Hong Wei-zhe.

A photo book signing event was held on 4 May 2024 at Citiarena in Banqiao.

The first overseas fan meeting was scheduled for 27 July 2024 in Bangkok, Thailand.

== Reception ==
In March 2025, Lifestyle Asia included Unknown in its list of the 12 best Taiwanese romantic dramas, highlighting the chemistry between the lead actors and the series' emotional depth.

== Awards and nominations ==
Year	Award	Category	Recipient(s)	Result	Ref.
2024	Splash Awards	BL of the Year	Unknown	Won	
