= Liljay =

LilJay/Brian
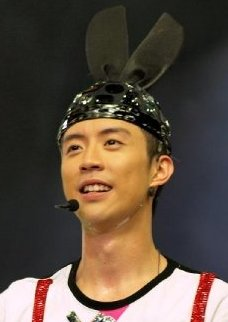
- Xiao Jie at Lollipop concert in Hong Kong (2009)
- Born: 廖俊傑 (pinyin: Liào Jùn Jié) Leow Jun Jie; 25 September 1986 (age 40)
- Occupations: Singer, actor, songwriter, presenter, dancer
- Years active: 2006 – present
- Musical career
- Origin: Republic of China (Taiwan)
- Genre: Mandopop
- Instrument: Guitar
- Labels: Gold Typhoon (formerly EMI Music) (2006-2009); Taiwan Sony Music Entertainment (2011-present); Legend star entertainment (2010-present)
- Website: JPM at Sony Music

Liao Xiao Jie (born Chinese: 廖俊傑; pinyin: Liào Jùn Jié; Pe̍h-ōe-jī: Liāu Chùn-kia̍t), also known as Xiao Jie or Liljay, is a member of a trio boyband, JPM, with Qiu Wang Zi and Qiu Mao Di.

He was a former member of Lollipop, a Taiwanese Mandopop boyband, which consists of six members, Zhuang Ao Quan/Owodog, Qiu Wang Zi/Prince, Yang Xiao Yu/Fabien, Liao Wei Lian/William, Liu A-wei, and himself. They were all chosen from Channel [V] Taiwan's show Bang Bang Tang (BBT 模范棒棒堂), a show which sought to create new male artists in the entertainment business of Taiwan.

Lollipop signed under the label Gold Typhoon (formerly EMI Capitol) and Channel [V] Taiwan in 2006. However, their artist management contract with Channel [V] Taiwan ended at the end of 2009. Liao is now signed under A Legend Star Entertainment Corp., a company founded by former Channel [V] Taiwan director, Andy Chang.

== Biography ==
=== Background ===
Liao Xiao Jie's family consists of his parents, a younger sister, and a younger brother. His younger brother was also a member of Bang Bang Tang II, but he was eliminated in the second round. He also owns a female Chow Chow, called Lolly. It was bought by him and Zhuang Ao Quan in 2009.

In his childhood, Liao studied in Taipei Municipal Hulu Elementary School, Taipei Municipal Chongqing Junior School, and Taipei Municipal Song Shan High School of Commerce. He then went on to attend Takming University of Science and Technology where he met Zhuang. However, due to their busy lives after joining Lollipop, they later transferred to Hsing Wu College, where he is currently a student in the Department of Applied English.

=== 2006–2007: The formation of Lollipop ===
Besides studying in the same school, him and Zhuang are also members of a Taiwanese breakdance group Black Angle Crew. In June 2006, they went to Bang Bang Tang (BBT) Taipei audition together and both were selected into "Bang Bang Tang" television show. The first episode of BBT was aired on August 14, 2006.

On November 27, 2006, the episode in which the six members of Lollipop were selected and revealed was aired. He was the first member to be selected into Lollipop. The members signed a contract to Channel V, and Dora Ao became their agent. They, then, officially signed a contract with EMI Capitol on December 2, 2006, appointing Zhuang as the leader of the newly formed group Lollipop. On December 9, 2006, Lollipop made its first public performance as a group at the V-Power Music Storm Concert.

=== 2007-08: Acting, Hosting, and Music debut ===
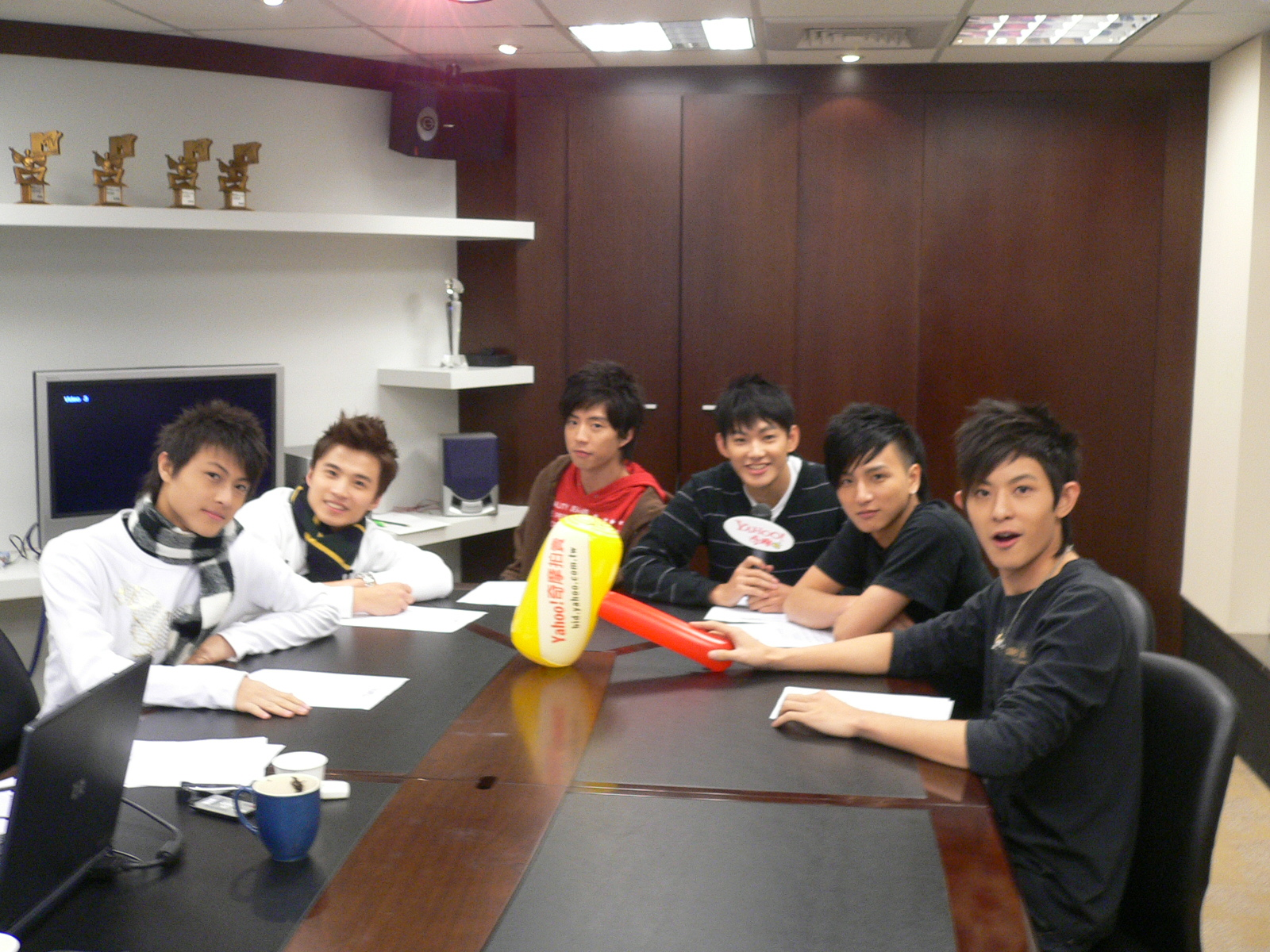
Lollipop with six members in 2007.

Lollipop's first EP, Colorful Lollipop was released on January 26, 2007, with six different covers, each featuring a member of the group. Four months later, on May 25, a second EP titled Summer's First Experience was released along with a photobook compiled with photos taken in Okinawa, as well as a DVD. Lyrics were written by Qiu and himself for the song "Summer's First Experience."

During the summer of 2007, Liao and the other members of Lollipop made their acting debut in the drama Brown Sugar Macchiato, a collaboration with Hey Girl. The first episode was aired in Taiwan on July 15, 2007. Later, Lollipop admits on Kangxi Lai Le that the drama had been more of an introduction of the two groups instead of a major acting challenge, as the members were told to act like themselves, and that many subplots were explained only briefly due to the large number of main characters. After thirteen episodes, the drama ended on October 7, 2007. They released an official soundtrack, then, with songs from Lollipop and Hey Girl. Liao wrote the lyrics for the opening theme of the said drama, entitled "黑糖秀"(Hei Tang Xiu).

On September 26, 2007, Lollipop visited Hong Kong to promote their television soundtrack Brown Sugar Macchiato. This was their first overseas promotional activity ever since their debut, and a huge fan turnout caused a great commotion at the shopping mall where they were having their autograph session. At the same time, Liao celebrated his birthday with thousands of fans in this event. At the same year, Lollipop began hosting their own show Lollipop Gyashan (LOLLIPOP哪裡怕) on October 27 until April 19, 2008, when the show stopped airing.

Lollipop's debut album Gyashan (哪裡怕) was released on December 28, 2007. Gyashan entered Mandarin charts in the number one position, outselling F4's album Waiting for You – Await Your Love (在這裡等你) which was released on the same day. Liao contributed lyrics to three of the ten songs in this album. On January 26, 2008, a year after the release of their first EP, Lollipop held its debut concert at the Taipei Arena. The concert DVD was released on June 6, 2008, breaking chart records with sales rates of more than 35%. The DVD has topped the charts for a period of one month since.

=== 2008-09: Graduation from BBT, I Am Legend Album and tours ===
Lollipop had been appearing regularly on Bang Bang Tang since August 14, 2006. With Channel [V]'s decision to select a new batch of boys and create a second season, Lollipop and most of the other members "graduated" from Bang Bang Tang after their last performances as members of the show. Their last official episode aired on August 29, 2008, marking the end of the first season. In total, the members of Lollipop had participated in more than 500 episodes of the show. However, since the start of Bang Bang Tang II, Liao had returned to the show as guest and co-host on several occasions.

After graduation from Bang Bang Tang television show, Liao began hosting Na Li Wu Da Kang (哪裡5打坑) with Zhuang, Liu A-wei, Hey Girl's Apple and Channel V's VJ Rong Jia. The first episode was aired on September 7, 2008, while the last episode was aired on November 30, 2008. During this period, Liao also guest starred in The Legend of Brown Sugar Chivalries, as well as writing lyrics for two songs in this drama, including the opening theme, Cang Jing Ge (藏經閣). On October 3, 2008, the original soundtrack was released by Gold Typhoon. Two editions were released for the soundtrack, one being a 10,000 limited edition.

In November, 2008, Liao was injured during one of their dance practices. He performed with an injury in Singapore's Music Monster Festival on November 22, 2008 and V-Power Love Music Concert on November 29. The V-Power concert united Liao, Zhuang, and Liu with other Black Angle Crew members for a dance performance. Lollipop's participation in the concert also marks, symbolically, the second anniversary of the group's formation. A week later, on December 6, 2008, Lollipop performed four songs with themes of wushu at the 45th Golden Horse Awards ceremony. Liao wrote the rap for one of the songs in this performance.

In February, 2009, Channel [V] began filming its revamped version and new season of Bang Bang Tang, which marked the return of several members from the first season, which includes Lollipop. Bang Bang Tang III began airing on March 2, 2009, with Show Lo being the first guest star. However, with show host Fan Fan leaving the show to focus on her musical career, Bang Bang Tang's last episode was aired on July 30, 2009. In 2009, Lollipop made its first lyric contributions to other artists, which are included in the mini album of the group Choc7, composed of seven members selected from the same show.

Lollipop's second album I am Legend was released on June 19, 2009. Liao contributed lyrics to four songs; and his first solo song is also recorded in this album. A concert tour in Asia with the same name commenced in Hong Kong Coliseum on July 4–5, 2009. While promoting I am Legend on several Taiwanese variety shows, including Kangxi Lai Le, 100% Entertainment, Azio Superstar, etc., Lollipop created a series of dance performances specifically for the show hosts of each show, thus completing a mini TV tour.

On September 12, 2009, a short film in which Liao was cast as the main lead, and directed and shot by Liu A-wei called The Great Escape (廖問之越V風雲) was aired on Channel [V] Taiwan.

Liao lived with the other members of Lollipop from 2006 to 2009. Due to disturbances caused by fans gathering outside their apartment, Lollipop had to move several times since their debut and had once lived in an apartment rented to them by BBT show host Fan Fan in Taipei. However, at the end of 2009, Liao has moved away from Lollipop's apartment and is now living with Qiu Wang Zi and Qiu Mao Di.

=== 2010-11: A Legend Star contract & Formation of JPM ===
Lollipop's artist management contract with Channel [V] Taiwan ended at the end of 2009. Former Lollipop members, Qiu and himself had been undergoing a series of secret training for the past year after they had separated with the band in 2009. On July 8, 2010, the two of them released a single entitled Dance Can Be Replaced ("舞可取代"). On September 10, they had their first concert at the Hong Kong Kowloon Bay International Trade and Exhibition Center to promote their single. In the end, their first single was successful as they received six awards at the end of the year, which includes "Popular Dance Song Award" and "Idol Award" by the "Metro Radio Mandarin Hits Music Awards Presentation", "Best Dance Song Award" and "Idol Award" by the "Seventh Hit Golden King Awards", and "Outstanding Dance Song Singers" and "Network Popular Singers" by the "Chinese Golden Melody Awards".

On the day of A Legend Star Entertainment Corp.'s first anniversary, Liao and Qiu Wang Zi decided to get back together and formed a new group called JPM, alongside Qiu's brother, Mao Di, on January 11, 2011. They signed a contract under A Legend Star Entertainment Corp., a company founded by former Channel [V] Taiwan director, Andy Chang. On August 26, 2011, JPM finally released their first album entitled Moonwalk. In this album, Liao filled the role of the producer for part of it.

Liao also continued his hosting career in Fun Week Explosion and Apple Fun Week

=== 2012-present: 365 Album, Flavor Lover Series ===
On January 25, JPM released a Japanese version for Moonwalk album. The album consists of Normal Edition and First Press Limited Edition, which comes with a bonus DVD containing five music videos, one-hour music special, and interview footage.

On November 30, JPM released their second studio album entitled 365 under the same label, Sony Music Taiwan. They use "Love" as the main theme of this album. In other words, each song is used to describe different types and stages of love. In addition with the theme of love, 365 album also emphasized the "Golden Triangle" concept to capture each members' individual firm and confidence and also to represent their strong brotherhood. According to Sony Music, JPM said: "We are the Golden triangle, the best ally and best friend" (「我們是黃金鐵三角，是最好的戰友也是最好的朋友」). Demonstrating the trio's mastery of a multitude of music styles, the new album's track list includes an electro-dance K-Pop-styled titular song "365 Days" especially produced by Korean producers. Moreover, the track list also includes a solo song for each member, and a collaboration with Kimberley Chen entitled "Internet". Once again, Liao took part in putting the album together as Liao filled the role of the producer for half of the album, lyricist of three songs and the composer of two songs.

Besides his music career, Liao Xiao Jie has been cast on Next TV's new television series called 愛味男女 (Flavor Lover) as a main lead, Tang Ai Wei, together with Tsai Yi-chen.

== Discography ==
=== Solo songs from JPM ===
- "愛情 Beautiful" (Beautiful Love) - from Moonwalk (album)
- "笑自己" (Laugh at Yourself) - from 365 (album)

=== Singles ===
Year	#	Information
2010	1st	Dance Can Be Replaced with Qiu Wang Zi: Chinese: 舞可取代; Pinyin: Wǔ kě qǔ dài; Released: 8 July 2010; Label: Sony Music Taiwan

=== Music Compositions ===
Year	Song	Details	Contribution
2007	"Great First Experience (夏日初體驗)"	Album:Summer's First Experience (夏日初體驗) Album; Release Date: 31 May 2007; Singer(s): Lollipop	part of the lyrics
2007	"Brown Sugar Show"	Album:Brown Sugar Macchiato Album; Release Date: 31 August 2007; Singer(s): Lollipop	lyrics
2007	"Between Us (我們之間)"	Album:Gyashan (哪裡怕) Album; Release Date: 28 December 2007; Singer(s): Lollipop	part of the lyrics
2007	"Follow My Tempo (跟著我的Tempo)"	Album:Gyashan (哪裡怕) Album; Release Date: 28 December 2007; Singer(s): Lollipop	part of the lyrics
2007	"That Day (那一天)"	Album:Gyashan (哪裡怕) Album; Release Date: 28 December 2007; Singer(s): Lollipop	lyrics
2008	"Cang Jing Ge (藏經閣)"	Album:The Legend of Brown Sugar Chivalries; Release Date: 6 October 2008; Singer(s): Lollipop/Hey Girls	part of the lyrics
2008	"Dear Baby"	Album:The Legend of Brown Sugar Chivalries; Release Date: 6 October 2008; Singer(s): Lollipop/Hey Girls	part of the lyrics
2009	"Too Young (太青春)"	Album:Too Young; Release Date: 29 May 2009; Singer(s): Choc7	lyrics
2009	"Exchange Diaries (交换日記)"	Album:I Am Legend; Release Date: 19 June 2009; Singer(s): Yang Xiao Yu (小煜), Liao Xiao Jie (小傑), Lollipop	lyrics
2009	"衝破封鎖線"	Album:I Am Legend; Release Date: 19 June 2009; Singer(s): Yang Xiao Yu (小煜), Liao Xiao Jie (小傑), Lollipop	lyrics
2009	"少了你的房間"	Album:I Am Legend; Release Date: 19 June 2009; Singer(s): Yang Xiao Yu (小煜), Liao Xiao Jie (小傑), Lollipop	lyrics
2009	"One Way"	Album:I Am Legend; Release Date: 19 June 2009; Singer(s): Yang Xiao Yu (小煜), Liao Xiao Jie (小傑), Lollipop	part of the lyrics
2011	"Star Love Song (星空戀曲)"	Album:原來如此！！; Release Date: 27 May 2011; Singer(s): A-Fü	part of the lyrics
2011	"Loved you for a long time (喜歡你好久)"	Album:Moonwalk; Release Date: 26 August 2011; Singer(s): JPM	part of the lyrics/ producer
2011	"Beautiful Love (爱情 Beautiful)"	Album:Moonwalk; Release Date: 26 August 2011; Singer(s): JPM	lyricist/composer/producer
2012	"Without you, there is no way (沒有辦法沒有你)"	Album:Kimberley; Release Date: April 2012; Singer(s): Kimberley Chen	part of the lyrics
2012	"Believe in Love (相信愛)"	Album:365; Release Date: 30 November 2012; Singer(s): JPM	lyricist/composer/producer
2012	"Internet (ft. Kimberley Chen)	Album:365; Release Date: 30 November 2012; Singer(s): JPM	lyricist/producer
2012	"The Downhill of Love (愛情的下坡)"	Album:365; Release Date: 30 November 2012; Singer(s): JPM	producer
2012	"Laugh at Yourself (笑自己)"	Album:365; Release Date: 30 November 2012; Singer(s): JPM	lyricist/producer

== Filmography ==
=== Films ===
Year	Title	Role
2008	六樓后座2家屬謝禮 Happy Funeral	Cameo (with Lollipop)
2009	廖問之越V風雲 (The Great Escape)	廖問
2012	極限衝鋒	Liang Wei (梁威)

=== Short films ===
Year	Title	Role
2013	愛味男女	Tang Yiwei (小傑-唐艾偉)

=== Music Video Appearances ===
Year	Song title	Singer(s)	Album
2010	Dance Can Be Replaced	Liao and Qiu Wang Zi	Dance Can Be Replaced single
2012	Ai Ni (Love You)	Kimberley Chen	Kimberley陳芳語

=== Television series ===
Years	English title	Original title	Character/Role
2007	"Sister is Coming" (Lollipop idol drama)	棒棒堂偶像劇《姐姐來了》	Salesperson
2007	Brown Sugar Macchiato	黑糖瑪奇朵 (黑糖玛奇朵) (Hei Tang Ma Qi Duo)	Xiao Jie
2007	"Love Is Here" (Lollipop idol drama)	棒棒堂偶像劇《愛情來了》	Supporting Character - novelist
2008	The Legend of Brown Sugar Chivalries	黑糖群俠傳 (黑糖群侠传) (Hei Tang Qun Xia Chuan)	Ronaldo
2013	Flavor Lover	愛味男女 (Ai Wei Nan Nu)	Tang Ai Wei

=== Television Hosting ===
Title	Channel	Date
Bang Bang Tang	Channel V Taiwan	14 August 2006 – 29 August 2008
娛樂新聞	TVBS-G	2007
我愛黑澀會	Channel V Taiwan	2007
LOLLIPOP哪裡怕	Channel V Taiwan	27 October 2007 – 19 April 2008
哪裡5打坑	Channel V Taiwan	7 September 2008 – 30 November 2008
Bang Bang Tang II	Channel V Taiwan	20 November 2008
Bang Bang Tang III	Channel V Taiwan	2 March 2009 – 30 July 2009
Fun Week Explosion (娛樂週爆)	壹電視	30 October 2010 - 31 August 2011
Apple Fun One Week (蘋果娛樂一週)	壹電視	1 September 2011
(我愛男子漢)	STV	6 January - 7 April 2012
Miss Perfect (超完美小姐)	爱尚TV	6 June 2012
Power of Man (給力男子漢)	四川衛視	22 September 2012

== Books ==
- 2011年2月 傳奇星2011寫真記事 - Legendary Star Memo 2011

== Awards ==
For Lollipop and JPM awards list, see also: Lollipop Awards and JPM Awards

Year	Category	Award	Reference(s)
2010	"Metro Radio Mandarin Hits Music Awards Presentation" (新城國語力頒獎禮)	Popular Dance Song Award for Dance Can Be Replaced (with Qiu Wang Zi)	
2010	"Metro Radio Mandarin Hits Music Awards Presentation" (新城國語力頒獎禮)	Idol Award (with Qiu Wang Zi)	
2010	Seventh Hit Golden King Awards (第七屆勁歌王金曲金榜)	Best Dance Song Award for Dance Can Be Replaced (with Qiu Wang Zi)	
2010	Seventh Hit Golden King Awards (第七屆勁歌王金曲金榜)	Idol Award (with Qiu Wang Zi)	
2010	Chinese Golden Melody Awards (華語金曲獎)	Outstanding Dance Song Singers (with Qiu Wang Zi)	
2010	Chinese Golden Melody Awards (華語金曲獎)	Network Popular Singers (with Qiu Wang Zi)	
