= Chris Chiu =

- 邱宇辰
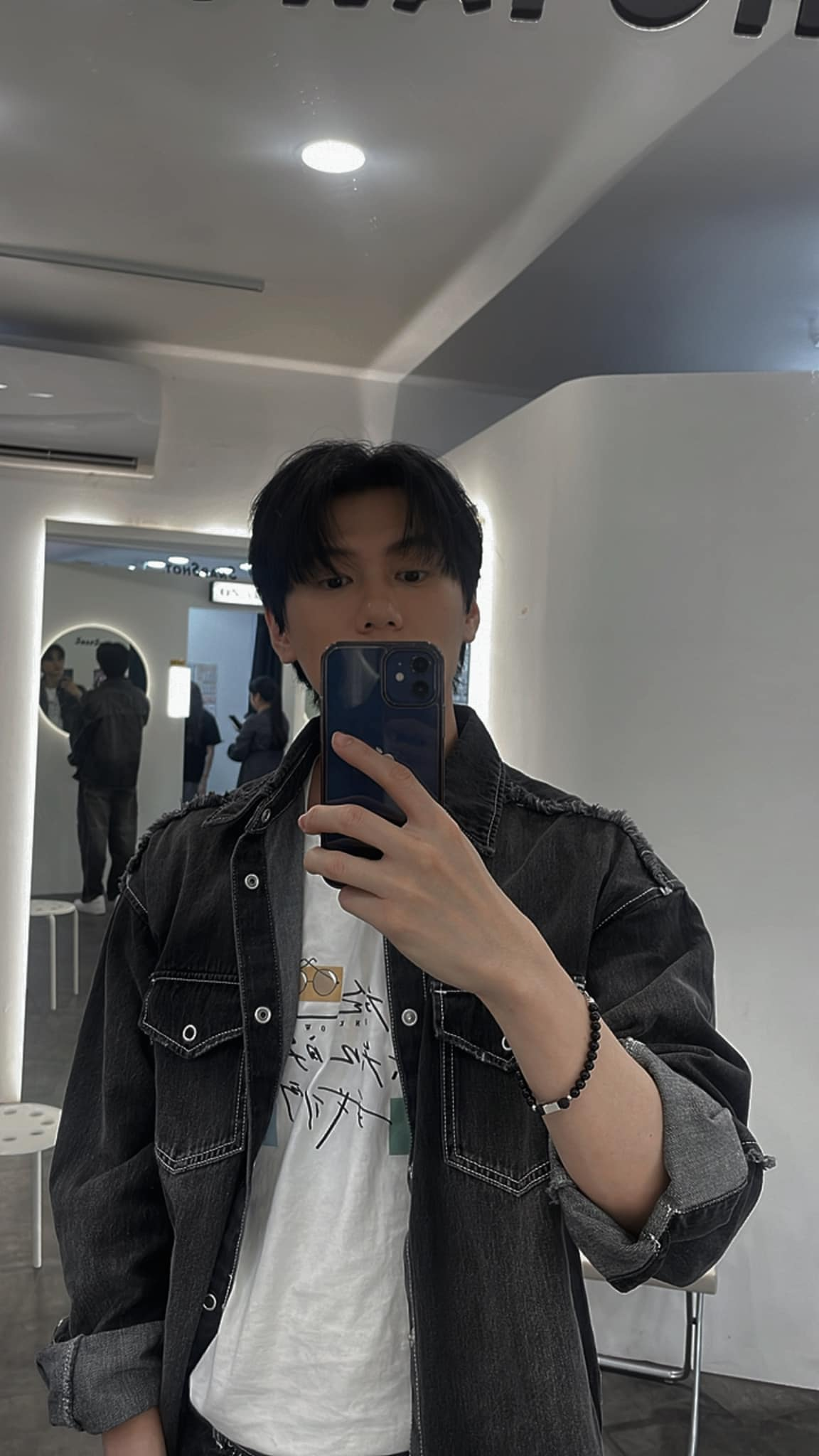
- Chiu in 2024
- Born: 邱翊橙 (pinyin: Qiū Yì Chéng); 10 October 1990 (age 35); Taichung, Taiwan
- Occupations: Singer, actor, presenter, dancer
- Years active: 2006 – present
- Musical career
- Also known as: Modi (Mao Di, 毛弟)
- Origin: Republic of China (Taiwan)
- Genre: Mandopop
- Instruments: Electric guitar, Drums
- Labels: Gold Typhoon (formerly EMI Music) (2008-2010); Taiwan Sony Music Entertainment (2011-2014); Legend star entertainment (2010-2015); HIM International Music Inc.(2015-2017); Fortune Entertainment Co., Ltd. (2017-present)
- Website: JPM at Sony Music

Chris Chiu (Chinese: 邱宇辰; pinyin: Qīu Yǔ Chén; Pe̍h-ōe-jī: Khu Ú-sîn), born Chiu Yi-cheng (Chinese: 邱翊橙; pinyin: Qiū Yì Chéng; Pe̍h-ōe-jī: Khu E̍k-chhêng), formerly known as Mao Di or Modi, is a member of a trio boyband, JPM, with Liao Xiao Jie/Liljay and his older brother, Prince Chiu (formerly known as Wang Zi, Chinese: 王子, lit. Prince).

He was a former member of Choc7, a Taiwanese Mandopop boyband with seven members. They were all chosen from Channel [V] Taiwan's show Bang Bang Tang (BBT 模范棒棒堂), a show which sought to create new male artists in the entertainment business of Taiwan.

In 2010, a rumor of Choc7's disbandment was spread and heard. However, it is still not confirmed as of now. Chiu is now signed under A Legend Star Entertainment Corp., a company founded by former Channel [V] Taiwan director, Andy Chang.

== Biography ==
=== Background ===
Chiu's family consists of his parents and an older brother. His older brother, Prince Chiu was a former member of Lollipop, and currently his co-member in JPM under Sony Music Taiwan.

Chiu was born in Taichung City, Taiwan on October 10, 1990. He attended in Taichung Liren Elementary School (臺中市北區立人國民小學) and Taichung Liren Junior High School (臺中市立立人國民中學). He also attended Jhuangjing Performing Arts Vocational Senior High School (莊敬高級職業學校表演藝術科).

=== 2008-10: Choc7 Era -formation to hiatus ===
A year after Lollipop was formed, Channel [V] is ready to create the second batch pop group of Bang Bang Tang variety show. After a round of making-the-band competitions, ten boys remained. Prior to the creation of Choc7, two five-member groups were formed: "Knights of Princess (Gong Zhu Bang)"; and "Elite of Otaku (Zhai Nan Shu)", which battled with each other in order to win the available spots in the new to-be-formed group. The former is formed by 翁瑞迪 (Ah Ben),韦佳宏 (Ye Shou), 簡翔棋 (Xiao Ma), 邗江 (Han Jiang), and Chiu, himself, while the latter is formed by Terry, 劉祿存 (Louis/Xiao Lu), 吳俊諺 (Wei Yu), 李銓 (Li Quan), and Ya Gao. The two groups battled simultaneously, which includes releasing of the same EPs with different tracks as part of their next stage of competition. On July 11, 2008, the two groups released an EP album entitled Adventure World (冒險世界), which consists of two versions, as said earlier. Eventually, 3 members were eliminated, and 7 were able to advance. Choc7, the newly formed group after Lollipop, was finally announced in 2008.

Aside from his music career, Chiu also starred on his debut film entitled Winds of September (九降風) as 謝志昇(阿昇) in 2008, and even won an award as one of The Top 10 Rising Stars in the "2008 Taipei Film Festival". He was also cast in the film Possible Love (愛到底) as "no. 3 bangs boy (第3號瀏海男孩)" in 2009.

On May 29, 2009, Choc7 released their first EP entitled Too Young (太青春), which consists of three songs. The first song, Tai Qing Chun, was written by their seniors, Lollipop; the second song, Wo Tai Ben was written by Chiu's brother, Prince Chiu; and the third song Deng Shen Me was written by Choc7's Wei Yu (吳俊諺).

In 2010, Qui and his co-member Wei Yu (吳俊諺) signed under A Legend Star Entertainment, and a rumor of Choc7's disbandment was spread and heard. However, it is still not confirmed as of 2017, though it is widely accepted that they have disbanded.

=== 2010-11: A Legend Star contract & Formation of JPM ===
Prior to JPM's formation, Chiu appeared on Liao and his elder brother Prince Chiu's single entitled Dance Can Be Replaced ("舞可取代") on July 8, 2010.

On the day of A Legend Star Entertainment Corp.'s first anniversary, Chiu became a part of the newly formed group called JPM, alongside Liao Xiao Jie and Chiu's brother, Prince, on January 11, 2011. They signed a contract under A Legend Star Entertainment Corp., a company founded by former Channel [V] Taiwan director, Andy Chang. On August 26, 2011, JPM finally released their first album entitled Moonwalk.

Besides his music career, Chiu has also been active in acting. He starred in Laugh Travels (嘻遊記) film, and Gloomy Salad Days in 2010, in which both are co-starred with Prince. He was also cast in the film The Break-Up Artist (分手达人) in 2011.

Chiu, together with his brother Prince, were also invited to join into ambassadors in the 2010 Asian Games, Guangzhou Asian Games Volunteer Hall of Fame. With their positive public image and work attitude, youthful joy and personal charm, they became the Guangzhou Asian Games volunteer spokesperson.

=== 2012-present: 365 Album, I Love You So Much series ===
On January 25, JPM released a Japanese version for Moonwalk album. The album consists of Normal Edition and First Press Limited Edition, which comes with a bonus DVD containing five music videos, one-hour music special, and interview footage.

In January 2012, Chiu was cast as "Mao Di" in I Love You So Much drama series.

On November 30, JPM released their second studio album entitled 365 under the same label, Sony Music Taiwan. They use "Love" as the main theme of this album. In other words, each song is used to describe different types and stages of love. In addition with the theme of love, 365 album also emphasized the "Golden Triangle" concept to capture each members' individual firm and confidence and also to represent their strong brotherhood. According to Sony Music, JPM said: "We are the Golden triangle, the best ally and best friend" (「我們是黃金鐵三角，是最好的戰友也是最好的朋友」). Demonstrating the trio's mastery of a multitude of music styles, the new album's track list includes an electro-dance K-Pop-styled titular song "365 Days" especially produced by Korean producers. Moreover, the track list also includes a solo song for each member, and a collaboration with Kimberley Chen entitled "Internet".

== Discography ==
For Choc7 and JPM Discography list, see also: Choc7 Discography and JPM Discography

== Filmography ==
=== Films ===
Year	Title	Role
2008	Winds of September (九降風)	謝志昇(阿昇)
2009	Possible Love (愛到底)	第3號瀏海男孩 (No. 3 bangs boy)
2010	Laugh Travels (嘻遊記)	沙地鼠
2014	The Break-Up Artist (分手达人)	
2016	My Egg Boy	
2018	The Outsiders	

=== Music Video Appearances ===
Year	Song title	Singer(s)	Album
2010	Dance can be replaced	Chiu and Liao Xiao Jie	Dance can be replaced single

=== Television series ===
Years	English title	Original title	Character/Role
2010	Gloomy Salad Days	死神少女 (Si Shen Shao Nu)	Ah Pang 阿龐
2012	I Love You So Much	粉愛粉愛你 (Fen Ai Fen Ai Ni)	Mao Di 毛弟
2019	Hello Again!	你有念大學嗎？(Ni You Nian Da Xue)	Liang Zi-Jie
2019	Without Her, Even Hero Is 0	我是顧家男	Xu Ke
2019	Go Big or Go Home	一起干大事	Lin Wei 林伟
2024	Unknown	關於未知的我們 (Guan Yu Wei Zhi De Wo Men)	Wei Qian 魏謙

=== Television hosting ===
Title	Channel
Bang Bang Tang I, II, and III	Channel V Taiwan
VJ Pop Style (VJ普普風)	Channel V Taiwan
Popular In House (流行In House)	Channel V Taiwan
I Love Blackie (我愛黑澀會)	Channel V Taiwan
Invisible Youth G (無敵青春克)	Channel V Taiwan
(哪裡5打抗)	Channel V Taiwan
(星空8爪娛 棒棒一志棒)	Channel V Taiwan
I Love Blackie Lollipop (我愛黑澀棒棒堂)	Channel V Taiwan
I Love Man (我愛男子漢)	Channel V Taiwan

== Books ==
- 2011年2月 傳奇星2011寫真記事 - Legendary Star Memo 2011

== Awards ==
For JPM awards list, see also: JPM Awards

Year	Category	Award	Result
2008	年入圍台北電影節十大明日之星 (2008 Taipei Film Festival)	Top Ten Finalists Rising Star (Winds of September film)	Won
2011	Golden Bell Awards	Best Newcomer Award (Gloomy Salad Days)	Won
