= Moonwalk (album) =

- Moonwalk album cover

Studio album 月球漫步 by JPM
- Released: 26 August 2011
- Genre: Mandopop
- Language: Mandarin
- Label: Sony Music (Taiwan)

JPM chronology
| Moonwalk (2011) | 365 (2012) |

Singles from Moonwalk
- 1. "月球漫步 (Moonwalk) " Released: August 11, 2011; 2. "那不是雪中紅 (This is not Rose in Snow)" Released: September 11, 2011; 3. "因為有你 (Because of You)" Released: September 20, 2011; 4. "平凡的美麗" Released: October 14, 2011; 5. "Never Give Up" Released: October 28, 2011

Music video
- "Moonwalk" on YouTube "This Is Not Rose In Snow" on YouTube "Because Of You" on YouTube  "Extraordinary Beauty" on YouTube "Never Give Up" on YouTube

Moonwalk (Chinese: 月球漫步) is Taiwanese Mandopop trio boyband JPM's first studio Mandarin album. It was first released on 26 August 2011 by Sony Music (Taiwan). On January 25, 2013, JPM released a Japanese version of the album. It consists of Normal Edition and First Press Limited Edition, which comes with a bonus DVD containing five music videos, one-hour music special, and interview footage.

== Album ==
Their single "Moonwalk" features a million-dollar music video in which the boys perform a spectacular "space dance" tailor-made for them by famous Taiwan dance choreographer Terry Lin. Aside from the music video, JPM members also contributed with the making of their album as Liao Xiao Jie filled the role of the producer for part of the album, while Qiu Wang Zi is the lyricist of three songs and composer of two songs in the album. In addition with the ten songs listed, the album also includes a Cantonese version of "因為有你" (Because of You). On August 29, three days after its release, the album sales reached more than 50,000 copies.

== Track listing ==
| No. | Title | Lyrics | Music | Arrangement | Length |
|---|---|---|---|---|---|
| 1. | "月球漫步" (Moonwalk) | 梁永泰 | 梁永泰; Ezekiel"Muzique"Keran 趙心蕾 | 梁永泰 | 5:08 |
| 2. | "因為有你" (Because of You) | Will Pan; Wang Zi | Will Pan | Qiu Wang Zi; Will Pan（Rap） | 4:26 |
| 3. | "喜歡妳好久" (Loved you for a long time - Qiu Mao Di's solo) | Liao Xiao Jie 何官錠 | 何官錠 | Qiu Wang Zi; Liao Xiao Jie | 3:37 |
| 4. | "平凡的美麗" (Extraordinary beauty) | Victor Lau | Victor Lau; Will'z Chieng | 吳禮強 | 3:39 |
| 5. | "那不是雪中紅" (This is not Rose in Snow) | Skot Suyama陶山 | 謝和弦; Skot Suyama陶山 | 謝和弦 | 3:40 |
| 6. | "佔為己有" (For himself - Qiu Wang Zi's solo song) | Victor Lau | Victor Lau 蔡志浩 | Ping | 3:38 |
| 7. | "Never Give Up" (Fifth song) | 畢國勇 | Talay Riler; Sigurdur Kristinn Sigtryggsson; Teitur Arnason; Gisli Krisjansson; Thomas Rosiji-Griffth | Qiu Wang Zi | 3:43 |
| 8. | "舞可取代" (Dance can be replaced) | 梁永泰 | Johnny Wu | 吳易緯 | 3:12 |
| 9. | "愛情 Beautiful" (Love is beautiful - Liao Xiao Jie's solo song) | Liao Xiao Jie 梁永泰 | Qiu Wang Zi 梁永泰 王知音 何官錠 | Liao Xiao Jie 趙心蕾 | 4:34 |
| 10. | "再一次擁有" | 梁永泰 | Qiu Wang Zi 梁永泰 王知音 | Qiu Wang Zi | 4:48 |
| 11. | "因為有你（粵）" (Because of You - Cantonese Version) | Victor Lau 梁永泰 | 潘瑋柏 | 蔡志浩 潘瑋柏（Rap） | 4:25 |
| Total length: | | | | | 44:50 |

== Music videos ==
- "月球漫步" (Moonwalk)
- "那不是雪中紅" (This is not Rose in Snow)
- ""因為有你" (Because of You)
- "平凡的美麗"
- "Never Give Up"
