= As the Bell Rings (Chinese TV series) =

2007 Chinese TV series

- Country of origin: China
- Original language: Mandarin
- No. of seasons: 5

Production
- Running time: 10 minutes
- Production company: Shanghai City Animation Company

Original release
- Network: Dragon Club; Disney Channel Taiwan
- Release: March 24, 2007 – July 25, 2011

Ke jian hao shiguang (课间好时光) is the Chinese adaptation of As the Bell Rings. It is adapted from the original Disney Channel Italy sitcom Quelli dell' Intervallo.

The show is produced by Shanghai City Animation Company, a subsidiary of Wenhui-xinmin United Press Group. It is shown on many regional channels in China through a syndicated show, Dragon Club. The show was also shown on Disney Channel Taiwan, with some characters' voices dubbed in Mandarin by voice actors familiar to Taiwanese audience.

In 2009, the show was adapted into an animated series, also produced by Shanghai City Animation Company. In 2010, the show was adapted into a stage musical performed during Expo 2010 in Shanghai. In 2011, the show was adapted into a Taiwanese version, with the same characters performed by Taiwanese actors, produced in Taiwan.

== Characters ==
- Zhang Jie (张杰)
- Ding Liang (丁亮)
- Hu Die (胡蝶)
- Wen Shanshan (文杉杉)
- Li Qi (李奇)
- Ma Boshi (马博仕)
- Yang Fan (羊帆)
- Zhu Zihao (朱子豪)
- Ding Anan (丁安安)
- Di Di (狄笛)
- He Liyanying (何励雁影)

== See also ==
- As the Bell Rings
