= Gloomy Salad Days =

2010 Taiwanese television series

- 死神少女
- Genre: Romance; Mystery; Suspense; School
- Directed by: Zero Chou
- Starring: Aaron Yan; Serena Fang
- Country of origin: Taiwan
- Original language: Mandarin
- No. of episodes: 20

Production
- Producers: Zero Chou; Hoho Liu (劉芸後)
- Production locations: Taichung, Taiwan
- Running time: 60 minutes

Original release
- Network: PTS
- Release: 9 October – 11 December 2010

Related
- Year of the Rain; Days We Stared at the Sun

Gloomy Salad Days (死神少女; pinyin: Sǐ Shén Shào Nǚ) is a 2010 Taiwanese television series starring Aaron Yan and Serena Fang. The first episode aired on Saturday, October 9, 2010 at 9 p.m. on PTS Channel; two episodes were broadcast back-to-back every week.

== Synopsis ==
The drama consists of 12 different stories of teenagers based on real life social cases. The main character is Du the Death Girl, guardian of the bridge called the "Nai He Qiao"; she is the Chinese equivalent of Charon, and the river under her bridge is the Chinese equivalent of the Styx.

The bridge is crumbling and its masonry is eroding, so Du sets off to repair the bridge; she seeks people who are willing to be turned into a rock in exchange for a wish. Du can only be summoned when a particular person has a rock from the bridge and is in such despair that they wish to die. However Shen Qi, who has a brain tumor, can see Du even without desiring death nor possessing a rock. After he learns that Du took Huang He away, Shen Qi tries to save people from Du and prevent her from taking their lives away.

Shen Qi slowly becomes curious about Du and tries to find out who she was in her previous life. He discovers that in Du's previous life she was a girl named Du He, whose Death Girl comic won first place in a competition. Another competitor named Gao Chao had substituted his best work for an inferior one to give Du He a better chance at winning the prize money, because she needed it more.

Not long after, Gao Chao proposes to Du He and they get married. Their marriage angers Du He's brother Du Ji, who is in love with his own sister. One night, Du Ji gets drunk and uses a wooden plank to hit Gao Chao, causing him to fall into a pool. Du He, shocked, comes out screaming for Gao Chao. Du Ji tries to calm her down and tells her the reasons for his actions. Du He reveals that she feels the same way as Du Ji does; however she does not wish to wrong Gao Chao and jumps into the pool. With the thought that her existence only brings tragedy to the world, she becomes brain dead and falls into deep coma. Gao Chao recovers but Du He does not; he flies to alone to Japan and becomes engaged to another woman.

Shen Qi, who started out pitying Du, begins to love her and Du comes to love him too. When Shen Qi's father learns that Shen Qi has a brain tumor, he immediately plans for it to be operated upon. However Shen Qi does not wish to have the tumor removed, as he knows that once removed he will never be able to see Du in this life again. Can the lovers be together though they are from two different worlds, or will they be forever separated?

== Cast ==
=== Main ===
Actor/Actress	Character	Introduction to Character	Appearance
Aaron Yan (炎亞綸)	Shen Qi (沈奇)	A teenager suffering from a brain tumor.; Falls in love with Death Girl.; The only person that can see Death Girl without the help of the stone.	Episode 1–20
Serena Fang (房思瑜)	Du (渡)	Guardian of the Bridge of Helplessness; Tasked to ferry different people to the afterlife.; Only appears when someone can't go through the most difficult part of their life and turns them into rocks to support the Bridge of Helplessness	Episode 1–20

=== Supporting and guest cast ===
Actor/Actress	Character	Introduction to Character	Appearance
Wang Zi (王子)	Huang He (黃禾)	Popular, rich, talented and good-looking.; Has two identities being the good and the bad side.; Has a crush on Xiao Qing after a debate competition.	Episode 1–2
Mao Di (毛弟)	A Pang (阿龐)	Grows up with his grandmother.; Has a crush on Xiao Qing.; High interest in drawing.; Calls for the help of Death Girl to get rid of Huang He.	Episode 1–2
Adriene Lin (林孟瑾)*	Jiang Ping (江萍)	Science teacher for Huang He's class.; Had a tryst with Huang He.	Episode 1–2
Qiu Xiu Min (邱秀敏)	Fa Shi Wai Po (法師外婆)	A Pang's beloved grandmother.	Episode 1–2
Summer Meng (孟耿如)	Chen Xiao Qing (陳筱青)	Prettiest girl in school.; Attracted the attention of Huang He after beating him in the debate competition.	Episode 1–2
Zhou Xian Zhong (周賢忠)	Hei Gou (黑狗)	Huang He's followers.; School's bully.	Episode 1–2
Cai Zhe Wen (蔡哲文)	Xiao Diao (小彫)	Huang He's followers.; School's bully.	Episode 1–2
Lin Zong Yan (林宗彥)*	Sha Dong (傻東/陳明東)	Xiao Qing's brother.; Has no guts in anything.	Episode 1–2
Zaizai Lin (林辰唏)	Ni Ke (妮可)	A rebellious girl.; Works as a prostitute to earn money for her family.	Episode 1, 3–6
Chang Chieh (張捷)	A Cai (阿才)	One of the gangsters in the school.; Ni Ke's boyfriend.	Episode 1, 3–5
Tang Zhen Gang (唐振剛)	A Guo (阿國)	Captain of the school's basketball team.; Xiao Ju's brother.	Episode 1, 7–10
Zhang Jun Ming (張君明)	Xiao Lin (小琳)	A quiet girl.; Transferred to Shen Qi's class.; Loves her parents very much.	Episode 2–4
Qiu Sen (秋森)	Hei Bao (黑豹)	A Cai's followers.	Episode 3–4
Ao Quan (敖犬)	A Jie (阿介)	Son of a famous calligraphist.; Has no interest in calligraphy but loves graffiti.	Episode 3–4
Kris Shen (沈建宏)	Xiao Tang (小唐)	A very good student and has a perfect family background.; Has a crush on Ni Ke.	Episode 3, 5–6
Ivy Fan (范筱梵)	Teacher	Xiao Lin's teacher.	Episode 3–4
Zhao Yi Lan (趙逸嵐/小八)	Li You (李優)	A mysterious person.; Hides her identity as a girl.	Episode 6–10
Wen Chen-ling	Xiao Ju	A Guo's younger sister.; Became a couple with Li You even though she knew that Li You was a girl.	Episode 7–10
Aviis Zhong (鍾瑤)	Qiao Qiao (巧巧)	A good student with a bad family background.; Likes Xiao Ju.	Episode 8–10
Andy Chen (陳奕)	Xiao Dao (小刀)	Dropped out of school twice.; Was a high school student for 4 years and hasn't graduated.; Very impulsive and arrogant.; Pei Pei's God-Brother.; Likes / Has a crush on Pei Pei.	Episode 9–12
Jay Shih	Li Qiang (李强)	Grew up with Xiao Dao.; Has a crush on Pei Pei.	Episode 11–12
Si Wei Hong Zheng(寺唯宏正)	Ah Jie Zheng (阿杰正)	－ Works for the gangsters.	Episode 11–12
Xiao Man (小蠻)	Pei Pei (佩佩)	Has a straightforward personality.; Interested in motorbikes.; Xiao Dao's God-Sister	Episode 9, 11–12
Jack Kao (高捷)	Shen Da Wei (沈大偉)	Shen Qi's father.; Only concerns about his decisions and doesn't know how to care about others.	Episode 11, 15
Ah Ben (阿本)	Xiao Lun (何緯侖/小侖)	Has a girly personality.; Gets tease by his classmates because of his girly behaviour and actions.	Episode 12–14
Ring Hsu (鴨子)*	Mi Xue (米雪)		Episode 13–14
Afalean Lu (盧學叡)	Lu Zi (盧子)		Episode 13–14
Zhang Yong Zheng (張永政)	Da Dong (大東)	Bullies Xiao Lun but falls in love with him.	Episode 13–14
Albee Liu (刘堇萱)		One of the participants for the musical.	Episode 13–14
Wu Xiong (五熊)	Ya Zhen (亞貞)	Has a lot of pressure due to her studies.	Episode 15–16
Vibo Wei (韋佳宏/野兽)*	A Hong (阿宏)	One of the gangsters of the school.	Episode 15–16
Darren Wang (王大陆)*	Xiao Hai (小海)	One of the gangsters of the school. Impregnates Ya Zhen.	Episode 15–16
Ven Gao (高英轩)	Shen Quan (沈泉)	Shen Qi's brother.; Went to Shen Qi's school to become a trainee teacher during a new semester.; Committed suicide to be with his girlfriend, Ruo Yao.	Episode 15–16
Jennifer Chu (初家晴)	Ruo Yao (若瑤)	Shen Quan's girlfriend.; Died during abortion.	Episode 15–16
Aaron Yan (炎亞綸)	Gao Chao (高超)	Was a newlywed couple with Du He.; Was knocked into a pool by Du Ji but got saved and furthered his studies in Japan.	Episode 17–20
Serena Fang (房思瑜)	Du He (杜荷)	Du's true self.; Was a newlywed couple with Gao Chao.; Jumped into a pool because she felt guilty about Gao Chao and Du Ji.; Doesn't know whether she should live or die, so she is in a coma situation.	Episode 17–20
James Wen (溫昇豪)	Du Ji (杜骥)	Du He's brother.; Fell in love with his own sister, Du He.; Takes drugs.; Pushed Gao Chao into a pool.	Episode 17–19
He Ya Xin (柯雅馨)	Jia Jia (佳佳)	A nurse.; Marries Du Ji.	Episode 17–19

* represents guest star

== Production ==
Gloomy Salad Days was filmed at the National Dongshih Industrial High School at Taichung, Taiwan (國立東勢高工; pinyin: guó lì dōng shì gāo gōng). For the filming of this drama, the school's name was changed to 石雨高校 (pinyin: shí yǔ gāo xiào).

== Broadcasting info ==
=== Taiwan ===
Broadcast period: 9 October 2010 - 11 December 2010
Day: Every Saturday
Time: 2100 - 2300
Channel: PTS Channel 13 (公視13頻道)
Repeats: Saturday (1300 - 1500)

=== Malaysia ===
Broadcast period: 23 November 2010 - 20 December 2010
Day: Monday - Friday
Time: 2230 - 2330
Channel: Astro Shuang Xing Channel 324 (ASTRO雙星 324頻道)
Repeats: Monday - Friday (2130 - 2230); Saturday (1230 - 1630)

== Ratings (PTS) ==
Date of broadcast	Episodes	Ratings
9 October 2010	1: Huang He 黃禾; 2: Xiao Qing 筱青	Average for all ages: 0.5 - 0.59; Ages 10 – 14: 1.62
16 October 2010	3: Xiao Lin 小琳[上] 4: Xiao Lin 小琳[下]	Average for all ages: 0.6; Ages 10 – 14: 1.85
23 October 2010	5: Ni Ke 妮可; 6: Xiao Tang 小唐	Average for all ages:0.6 Ages 10 – 14: 2.61
30 October 2010	7: Li You 李優; 8: A Guo 阿國	Average for all ages: 0.74; Ages 10 – 14: 2.73
6 November 2010	9: Xiao Ju 小菊; 10: Qiao Qiao 巧巧	Average for all ages: 0.84; Ages 10 – 14: 3.75
13 November 2010	11: Xiao Dao 小刀; 12: Li Qiang 李强	Average for all ages: 0.97; Ages 10 – 14: 2.0 - 3.0
20 November 2010	13: Xiao Lun 小仑; 14: Da Dong 大东	Average for all ages: 0.5; Ages 10 – 14: 1.0 - 2.0
27 November 2010	15: Ya Zhen 亚贞; 16: Shen Quan 沈泉	Average for all ages: 0.81; Ages 10 – 14: 2.90
4 December 2010	17:Du He 杜荷; 18:Gao Chao 高超	Average for all ages: 0.96; Ages 10 – 14: 4.45
11 December 2010	19:Du 渡 20:Shen Qi 沈奇	Average for all ages: 1.08; Ages 10 – 14: 5.07

== Other media ==
=== Gloomy Salad Days Original Soundtrack 《死神少女》電視原聲帶 ===
- Released on 19 November 2010 by Rock Records.

No.	Song title	Singer
1.	盛開的消沒的人群	
2.	Gloomy Salad Days	Wan Fang 萬芳
3.	遠遠地離開現在	
4.	棉花雲	Jay Shih 是元介
5.	全天下的白雲都從海裡浮起	
6.	花開不愁沒顏色	
7.	渡	Wan Fang 萬芳
8.	結果我們戒不掉直視太陽的毛病	
9.	就讓我碎在這裡	Andy Chen 陳奕
10.	就在塵埃全數上昇的那個時	
11.	Gloomy Sunday	Serena Fang 房思瑜

==== Opening Theme ====
- Song Title: Gloomy Salad Days
- Lyricist: Guo Jin Ru (郭晉汝)
- Composer: ARNY, Mumu
- Singer: Wan Fang (萬芳)

==== Ending Theme ====
- Song Title: Du (渡)
- Lyricist: Guo Jin Ru (郭晉汝)
- Composer: ARNY, Mumu
- Singer: Wan Fang (萬芳)

=== Gloomy Salad Days DVD 《死神少女》DVD ===
- Release date: 25 December 2010
- Can be pre-ordered in Taiwan.

== Publications ==
=== Gloomy Salad Days Novel (死神少女 電視小說) ===
- Author: Xia Fei (夏霏)
- Release date: 11 October 2010
- Publisher: Booker Publications (布克文化)

=== Gloomy Salad Days Manga (死神少女 漫畫) ===
- Publisher: Tong Li Comics (東立出版社)

=== Gloomy Salad Days Pictorial Book (死神少女 寫真書) ===
- Publisher: Booker Publications (布克文化)
- Release date: 16 November 2010

== News ==
1. 27.04.2010 Director Zero Chou shares "Death Girl filming concept (In CHI).
2. 27.04.2010 Aaron Yan and Serena Fang have a ghostly romance mid-air.
3. 28.04.2010 Peter Ho shows support as guest star, seeing Aaron Yan, turns into an incestuous psycho.
4. 28.04.2010 Aaron Yan's brain tumor gives him the sixth sense, Wu Chun's migraine helps out.
5. 31.07.2010 Death Girl will air at PTS on 18 September.
6. 02.08.2010 Aaron Yan rushing drama had not shut eye in 24 hours.
7. 20.08.2010 Aaron injured on Gloomy Salad Days's set.(In CHI)
8. "Death Girl," staged a "close contact body struggle scene" with Aaron.
9. Aaron Yan & Serena Fang's Bed Scene Makes Director Blush.
