= Choc7 =

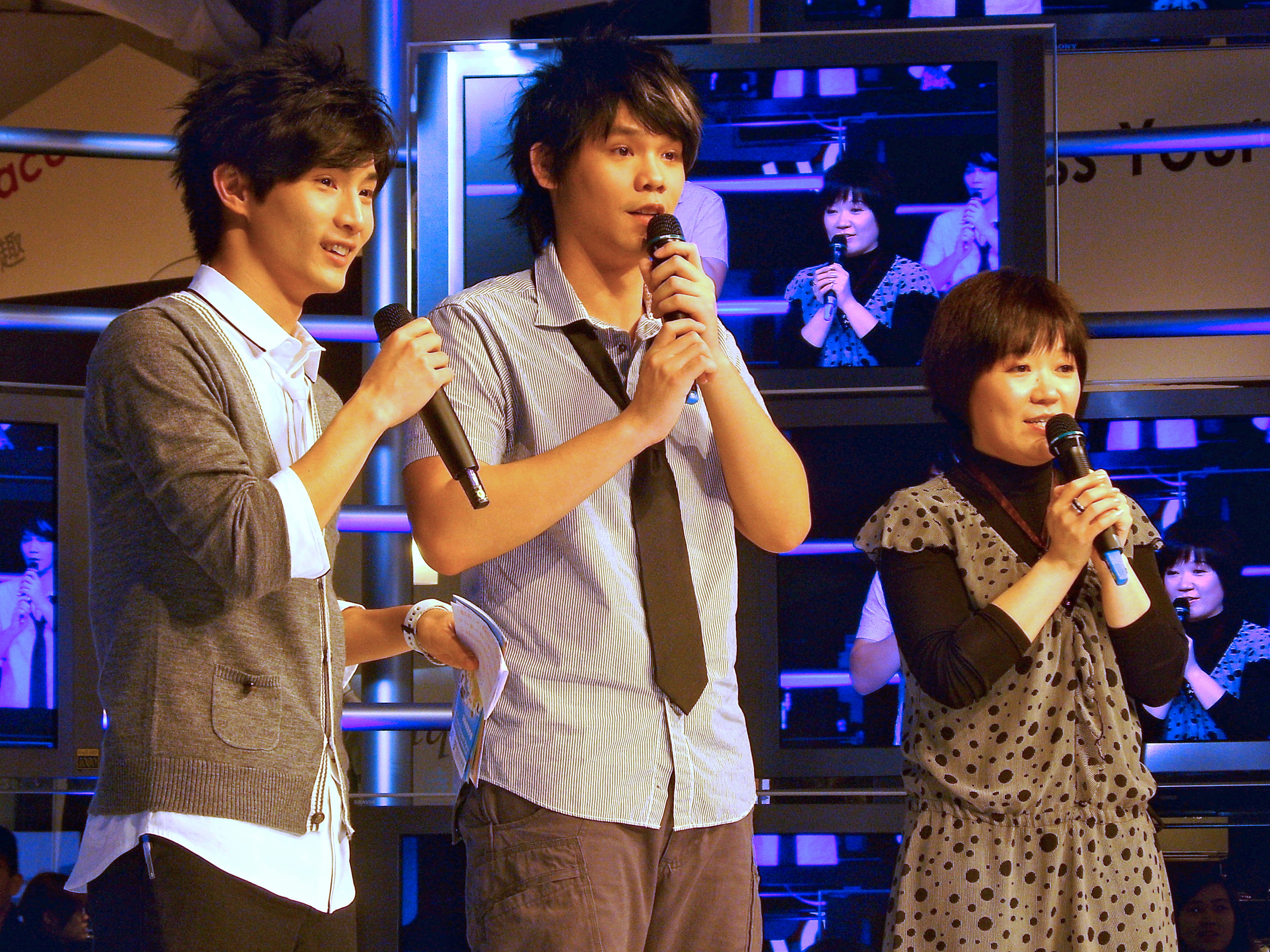
- Born: Taipei City, Republic of China (Taiwan)
- Occupation(s): Singer, dancer, host, actor
- Years active: 2009–present
- Musical career
- Origin: Republic of China (Taiwan)
- Instrument(s): electric guitar： Mao Di、Xiao Lu guitar：Ah Ben (Leader) drum：Li Quan bassist：Xiao Ma bongos：Wei Yu electric piano：Ye Shou
- Labels: Gold Typhoon (formerly EMI Music)
- Website: Woo.com

Choc7 (Chinese: 超克7; pinyin: Chao Ke Qi) is a Taiwanese boyband group led by Ah Ben and is the second spin-off group of the Taiwanese variety show Mo Fan Bang Bang Tang (模范棒棒堂).

== Career ==
A year after Lollipop was formed, Channel [V] is ready to create the second batch pop group of Bang Bang Tang variety show. After a round of making-the-band competitions, ten boys remained. Prior to the creation of Choc7, two five-member groups were formed: "Knights of Princess (Gong Zhu Bang)"; and "Elite of Otaku (Zhai Nan Shu)", which battled with each other in order to win the available spots in the new to-be-formed group. The former is formed by 翁瑞迪 (Ah Ben),韦佳宏 (Ye Shou), 簡翔棋 (Xiao Ma), 王勇翰 (Han Jiang), and 邱翊橙 (Mao Di), while the latter is formed by 江振愷 (Terry), 劉祿存 (Louis/Xiao Lu), 吳俊諺 (Wei Yu), 李銓 (Li Quan), and 謝東裕 (Ya Gao). The two groups battled simultaneously, which includes releasing of the same EPs with different tracks as part of their next stage of competition. On 11 July 2008, the two groups released an EP album entitled Adventure World (冒險世界), which consists of two versions, as said earlier. Eventually, 3 members were eliminated, and 7 were able to advance. Choc7, the newly formed group after Lollipop, was finally announced in 2008.

On 29 May 2009, Choc7 released their first EP entitled Too Young (太青春), which consists of three songs. The first song, Tai Qing Chun, was written by their seniors, Lollipop; the second song, Wo Tai Ben was written by Mao Di's brother, Wang Zi; and the third song Deng Shen Me was written by Choc7's Wei Yu (吳俊諺).

In 2010, Mao Di and his co-member Wei Yu (吳俊諺) signed under A Legend Star Entertainment, and a rumor of Choc7's disbandment was spread and heard. However, it is still not confirmed as of 2012.

== Members ==
Member	Stage Name		Real Name		Birth Date
Member	Chinese	pinyin	Chinese	pinyin	Birth Date
Ah Ben / Ben (Leader)	阿本	Ā Běn	翁瑞迪	Weng Rui Di	11 June 1982 (age 43)
Qiu Mao Di/Modi	毛弟	Máo Dì	邱翊橙	Qiū Yì Chéng	10 October 1990 (age 35)
Wei Yu / Gevin	鮪魚	Wěi Yú	吳俊諺	Wú Jùn Yàn	19 September 1989 (age 36)
Ye Shou / Vibo	野獸	Yě Shòu	韦佳宏	Wéi Jiā Hóng	10 September 1990 (age 35)
Li Quan / Peter	李銓	Li Quán			9 June 1990 (age 35)
Xiao Ma / Shawn	小馬	Xiǎo Mǎ	簡翔棋	Jiǎn Xiáng Qí	8 July 1983 (age 42)
Xiao Lu / Louis	小祿	Xiǎo Lù	劉祿存	Liu Lu Cun	2 February 1987 (age 38)

== Discography ==
=== EP ===
Year	Title	Details	Track listing
2008	Adventure World (冒險世界)	Release Date: 11 July 2008; Label: Gold Typhoon; Format: EP; Versions:Knights of Princess Elite of Otaku; Language: Mandarin	Track listing: Knights of Princess (公主幫EP內容); 1. "Adventure World fantasy version" 2. "公主徹夜未眠"; 3. "年輕不要留白"; Elite of Otaku (宅男塾EP內容); 1. "Adventure World Dance Power Version"; 2. "阿宅失眠日記"; 3. "逍遙遊"
2009	Too Young	Release Date: 29 May 2009; Label: Gold Typhoon; Format: EP+DVD; Language: Mandarin	Track listing: 1. "Too Young (太青春)"; 2. "So What (等什麼)"; 3. I'm Dumb"(我太笨)"

=== Music Videos ===
Year	Song	Album
2008	"冒險世界" (Adventure World Fantasy Version) 公主幫成員	Adventure World
2008	"冒險世界" (Adventure World Dance Power Version) 宅男塾成員	Adventure World
2008	"阿宅失眠日記" 公主幫成員	Adventure World
2008	"阿宅失眠日記" 宅男塾成員	Adventure World
2008	"平凡的美麗"	Adventure World
2009	"太青春" (Too Young)	Too Young
2009	"等什麼" (So What)	Too Young
2009	"我太笨" (I'm Dumb)	Too Young

== Filmography ==
=== Films ===
Year	Title	Member	Role
2008	九降風 Winds of September	Qiu Mao Di	謝志昇(阿昇)
2009	愛到底 Possible Love	Qiu Mao Di	第3號瀏海男孩 (No. 3 bangs boy)
2010	嘻遊記 Laugh Travels	Qiu Mao Di	沙地鼠

=== Television series ===
Years	English name	Chinese name	Members
2007	Brown Sugar Macchiato	黑糖瑪奇朵	Xiao Ma & Li Quan
2007	The Teen Age	18禁不禁	Ah Ben
2008	The Legend of Brown Sugar Chivalries	黑糖群俠傳	Xiao Ma & Ah Ben
2009	Love	愛到底	Ah Ben, Qiu Mao Di, Xiao Ma, Xiao Lu, Li Quan, Wei Yu
2010	Gloomy Salad Days	死神少女	Ah Ben, Qiu Mao Di
2010	The M Riders 2	萌學園之萌騎士傳奇	Ah Ben
2014	The Break-Up Artist	分手达人	Qiu Mao Di
