= List of Taiwanese singers =

The source of information for this list comes from zh:Category:台灣男歌手, zh:Category:台灣女歌手 and zh:Category:台灣原住民歌手. Sources for names and ethnicity can be found in their respective article pages.

The following is a list of Taiwanese singers in alphabetical order.

Artists are listed by the name they are known in English followed by their stage name in Chinese. Their birth name is given in parentheses and bold text signifies their ethnic minority group and aboriginal name if available.

== A ==
- A-fu 阿福 (鄧福如)
- A-Lin 阿玲 (黃麗玲) **Lisang Pacidal Koyouan (Amis)**
- A-Sun 阿桑 (黃嬿璘)
- A-mei 阿妹 (張惠妹) **Amit Kulilay (Puyuma)**
- Ady An 安以軒 (吳玟靜)
- Amber An 安心亞 (廖婧伶)
- Ang It-hong 洪一峰 (洪文路) Enka singer
- Shone An 安鈞璨 (黃益承)
- Ann 白安 (白安嚴) **(Manchu)**
- Ashin 阿信 (陳信宏) (band: Mayday 五月天)

== B ==
- Bii (畢書盡/필서진)
- Patrick Brasca (派偉俊)

== C ==
- Yako Chan 丫頭 (詹子晴)
- Angela Chang (張韶涵) **(Hakka)**
- Deserts Chang 張懸 (焦安溥)
- Chang Hsiu-ching (張秀卿)
- Jeff Chang (張信哲)
- Jing Chang 張芸京 (張芸菁)
- Marcus Chang 張立昂 (張文謙)
- Mini Chang (張甯兒) **(Atayal)**
- Phil Chang 張宇 (張博翔)
- Sylvia Chang (張艾嘉)
- Chang Yu-sheng (張雨生) **(Atayal)**
- Bobby Chen 陳昇 (陳志昇)
- Chang Chen (張震)
- Chang Chen-yue (張震嶽) **Ayal Komod (Amis)**
- Calvin Chen 辰亦儒 (陳奕儒)
- Candy Chen (陳斯亞)
- Ella Chen (陳嘉樺) **(Hakka)** (band: S.H.E)
- Cheer Chen (陳綺貞)
- Ian Chen (陳彥允)
- Joe Chen (陳喬恩) **(Hakka)**
- Chen Jiannian (陳建年) **Purdur (Puyuma)**
- Chen Meifeng (陳美鳳)
- Michelle Chen (陳妍希)
- Nylon Chen (陳乃榮)
- Renée Chen (陳嘉唯)
- Sarah Chen (陳淑樺)
- Chen Ying-git (陳盈潔)
- Enno Cheng (鄭宜農)
- Joe Cheng (鄭元暢)
- Jody Chiang 江蕙 (江淑惠)
- Maggie Chiang (江美琪) **(Hakka)**
- Chiang Shu-na (江淑娜)
- Vincent Chiao (焦恩俊)
- Chyi Chin (齊秦) **(Manchu)**
- Kao Chin Su-mei (高金素梅) **Ciwas Ali (Atayal) (Manchu)**
- Roy Chiu (邱澤) **(Hakka)**
- Chao Chuan (趙傳)
- Joyce Chao (趙虹喬)
- Sissey Chao (趙一豪)
- Chou Chuan-huing (周傳雄)
- Eric Chou (周興哲)
- Jay Chou (周杰倫)
- Nick Chou (周湯豪)
- Genie Chuo (卓文萱)
- Chou Tzu-yu (周子瑜)
- Vic Chou 周渝民 (周育民)
- Jacky Chu (祝釩剛)
- Chu Ke-liang 豬哥亮 (謝新達)
- Miu Chu (朱俐靜) **(Hakka)**
- Chyi Yu (齊豫) **(Manchu)**

== D ==
- Jerome Xavier DuBois (杜杰)
- Dewi Chien (簡廷芮)

== F ==
- Christine Fan (范瑋琪)
- Mavis Fan (范曉萱)
- Fang Wen-lin 方文琳 (陳美玲)
- Fei Xiang (費翔 Kris Phillips)
- Fei Yu-ching 費玉清 (張彥亭)
- Fong Fei-fei 鳳飛飛 (林秋鸞)

== G ==
- Gua Ah-leh (歸亞蕾)
- Emma Wu (吳映潔)

== H ==
- Peter Ho (何潤東)
- Angel Hong (洪詩)
- Elva Hsiao (蕭亞軒)
- Hsiao Huang-Chi (蕭煌奇)
- Hsiao Hung-jen (蕭閎仁)
- Jam Hsiao (萧敬腾) **(Amis)**
- Hsieh Ho-hsien (謝和弦)
- Jeannie Hsieh (謝金燕)
- Winnie Hsin (辛曉琪)
- Candy Hsu (許雅涵)
- Evonne Hsu (許慧欣)
- Jason Hsu (許孟哲) (band: 5566)
- Lala Hsu (徐佳莹)
- Peggy Hsu (許哲珮)
- Valen Hsu (許茹芸)
- Vivian Hsu (徐若瑄) (Japan: ビビアン・スー) **(Atayal)**
- Yuki Hsu (徐懷鈺)
- Alien Huang (黄鸿升)
- Huang An (黃安)
- Ehlo Huang (黃玉榮) **(Hakka)** (band: 183 Club)
- Huang Fei (黃妃)
- Jane Huang (黃美珍)
- Stanley Huang (黃立行)
- Tiger Huang (黃小琥)
- Huang Yee-ling (黃乙玲)
- Wallace Huo (霍建華)
- MC HotDog (姚中仁)
- Chris Hung (洪榮宏) Enka singer

== J ==
- Jasmine (庭竹)
- Jia Jia (紀家盈) **Auli Puruburubuane (Puyuma)**
- Richie Jen (任賢齊)
- Selina Jen (任家萱) (band: S.H.E)

== K ==
- Takeshi Kaneshiro (金城 武) **(Japanese)**
- Kang Kang 康康 (康晉榮)
- Frankie Kao (高凌風)
- Sammi Kao (高勝美) **Malas Kao (Bunun)**
- Ilid Kaolo (以莉·高露) **Ilid Kaolo (Amis)**
- Alan Ko (柯有倫)
- Ko Chen-tung (柯震東)
- Amber Kuo (郭采潔)
- Claire Kuo (郭靜)
- MeiMei Kuo (郭婕祈)
- Puff Kuo (郭雪芙) (band: Dream Girls)
- Kuo Shu-yao (郭書瑤)

== L ==
- Lai Kuan-lin (賴冠霖)
- Megan Lai (賴雅妍)
- Karena Lam (林嘉欣) **(Japanese)**
- Pauline Lan (藍心湄)
- Dino Lee (李玉璽)
- Lee E-jun 李翊君 (李華苓)
- Jonathan Lee (李宗盛)
- Lego Lee (李國毅)
- Nana Lee (李千娜)
- Sam Lee (singer) (李聖傑)
- Tia Lee (李毓芬) (band: Dream Girls)
- Lee Wei (李威)
- Rachel Liang (梁文音)
- Linda Liao 廖語晴 (廖佩伶)
- Liljay (廖俊傑)
- Freddy Lim (林昶佐)
- Freya Lim (林凡) **(Malay)**
- Ariel Lin (林依晨)
- Austin Lin (林柏宏)
- Estrella Lin (林韋伶) (band: 3EP Beauties)
- Jimmy Lin (林志穎)
- Ruby Lin (林心如)
- Shara Lin (林逸欣)
- Shino Lin (林曉培)
- Terry Lin (林志炫)
- Yoga Lin (林宥嘉)
- Lin Yu-chun (林育羣)
- Aya Liu (柳翰雅)
- Rene Liu (劉若英)
- Liu Wen-cheng (劉文正)
- Will Liu (劉畊宏)
- Jerry Lo (羅百吉)
- Lo Ta-yu (羅大佑) **(Hakka)**
- Long Qianyu (龍千玉)
- Crowd Lu (盧廣仲)
- Show Lo (羅志祥) **(Amis)**

== M ==
- Ma Chia-ling (馬嘉伶) (band: AKB48, Japan)
- Mao Di 毛弟 (邱翊橙) **(Hakka)** (band: JPM)
- MC40 (薛仕凌)
- Ming Dao 明道 (林朝章) (band: 183 Club)
- Monster (musician) (溫尚翊) **(Hakka)**

== O ==
- One-Fang 萬芳 (林萬芳)
- Judy Ongg (翁倩玉) (Japan: Okina Tamae 翁玉恵)
- Ocean Ou (沈益嶒)
- Owodog 敖犬 (莊濠全) (band: Lollipop F)

== P ==
- Pai Bing-bing (白冰冰)
- Pan Mei-chen (潘美辰)
- Will Pan (潘瑋柏)
- Eddie Peng (彭于晏)
- Julia Peng (彭佳慧)

== Q ==
- Qiu Xinyi (邱欣怡) (band: SNH48, China)

== S ==
- Samingad (紀曉君) **Samingad Puruburubuane (Puyuma)**
- Shiao Lih-ju (蕭孋珠) (Japan: Shirley Shiao シャーリー・シャウ)
- Michael Shih (施文彬)
- Shin (singer) (蘇見信) (band: Shin)
- Showlen Maya (沈秀蘭) **Showlen Maya (Bunun)**
- Shu Qi 舒淇 (林立慧)
- Alec Su (蘇有朋) **(Hakka)**
- Su Rui 蘇芮 (蘇瑞芬)
- Tarcy Su (蘇慧倫)
- Sun-sun (singer) 純純 (劉清香)
- Sun Shu-may (孫淑媚)

== T ==
- Samuel Tai 邰正宵 (邰正霄)
- Danson Tang (唐禹哲)
- Tank (呂建忠) **(Puyuma)**
- David Tao 陶喆 (陶緒忠)
- Tao Ching-Ying (陶晶莹)
- Teresa Teng (鄧麗君)
- Hebe Tien (田馥甄) **(Hakka)** (band: S.H.E)
- Tsin Ting (静婷)
- Tzuyu (周子瑜)
- Bowie Tsang (曾寶儀) **(Hakka)**
- Tsai Chin (singer) (蔡琴)
- Tseng Hsin-mei 曾心梅 (曾小萍)
- Joanne Tseng (曾之喬) **(Atayal)**
- Jolin Tsai (蔡依林)
- Tsai Lan-chin (蔡藍欽)
- Mini Tsai (蔡黃汝)
- Figaro Tseng (曾少宗)
- Angus Tung (童安格)
- Pets Tseng (曾沛慈)

== V ==
- Lara Veronin (梁心頤) **(Russian)**

== W ==
- Wang Zi (邱勝翊) **(Hakka)** (band: JPM)
- Chloe Wang (王樂妍)
- Cyndi Wang (王心凌) **(Hakka)**
- Dave Wang 王傑 (王大為)
- Jiro Wang 汪東城 (汪東成) (band: Fahrenheit)
- Joanna Wang (王若琳) **(Hakka)**
- Wang Shih-hsien (王識賢)
- Kingone Wang (王傳一)
- William Wei (韋禮安)
- Landy Wen (溫嵐)
- Quinn Weng (翁碩瑜)
- Weng Li-you (翁立友)
- Wu Bai 伍佰 (吳俊霖)
- Jacky Wu (吴宗宪)
- Kenji Wu (吳克群)
- Nicky Wu (吳奇隆) (band: Xiao Hu Dui)
- Wu Tsing-Fong (吳青峰) (band: Sodagreen)
- Vanness Wu (吳建豪) (band: F4)
- Fang Wu (吳汶芳)

== X ==
- Xiao Man (王承嫣) (band: Hey Girl)
- Xiao Xun 小薰 (黃瀞怡) (band: Hey Girl)
- Xiao Yu 小宇 (宋念宇)

== Y ==
- Aaron Yan (炎亞綸) (band: Fahrenheit)
- Jerry Yan (廖洋震) **(Hakka)** (band: F4)
- Aska Yang (楊宗緯)
- Faith Yang (楊乃文)
- Yang Li-hua (楊麗花)
- Roger Yang (楊培安)
- Rainie Yang (楊丞琳)
- Yao Yuanhao 姚元浩 (鄧詠麟)
- Sally Yeh (葉蒨文)
- Cindy Yen (袁詠琳)
- Yen Hsing-su (顏行書) (band: 183 Club)
- Yen-j (嚴爵)
- Annie Yi 伊能靜 (吳靜怡) (Japan: Ino Shizuka 伊能静)
- Evan Yo (蔡旻佑)
- Yu Chan Taiwan Music (YuChan台灣音樂)
- Harlem Yu (庾澄慶)

== Z ==
- Zheng Zhihua (鄭智化)
- Timi Zhuo (卓依婷)

== See also ==
- List of C-pop artists
- List of Taiwanese people
