= Apple Huang =

Taiwanese music artist

Apple Huang 黃暐婷
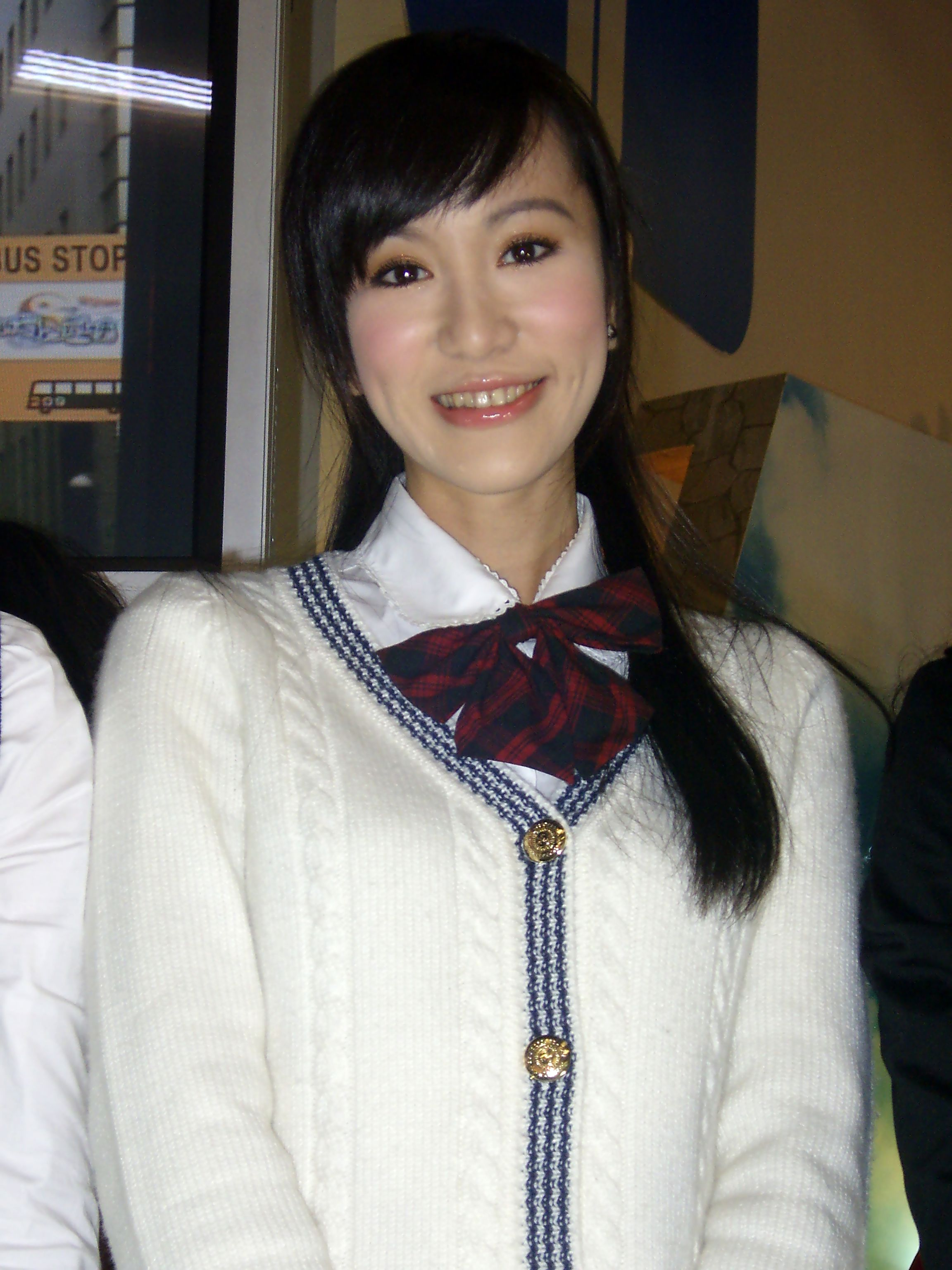

Background information
- Also known as: Apple; Ai Bo (愛波); Che Sen (車神); Xiao Tianxin (小甜心); Miao Li (妙麗); Yueliang Lian (月亮臉); Shiye (師爺); Gudian Meimei (古典美眉); Pingguo Nushen (蘋果女神)
- Born: 28 March 1984 (age 42); Xinwu District (Taoyuan City), Taoyuan, Taiwan
- Genre: Mandopop
- Occupations: Presenter; singer; actress
- Years active: 2005–
- Labels: Linfair Records 2005–08; Warner Music Taiwan 2008–09

Apple Huang (Chinese: 黃暐婷; pinyin: Huáng Wěitíng; born 28 March 1984), known by her stage name Apple, is a Taiwanese music artist.

== Life and work ==
Apple Huang is a Hwa Kang Arts School graduate, and studied at the drama department of the Chinese Culture University. In 2001, she participated in Guess to win the classic beauty competition. Later she was selected as the first of the nine Hey Girl music group (formerly known as Black Bitter Meimei) and became the oldest member of the group. Her sister Yuri Huang and her brother Huang Yuxiang are also in the entertainment industry.

== Programmes ==
=== Presiding ===
- Channel V
  - Blackie Lollipop (Off air)
  - Blackie's Teenage Club (Off air)
  - Meimei Pu Pu Feng (Off air)
  - First Mo Fan Bang Bang Tang assistant (Off air)
- Where 5.com (Also Owodog, Liljay, Awayne Liu and Chiago Liu presided over) (7 September to 30 November 2008) (Off air)
- TVBS-G
  - Yule Xinwen - Meimeib Ao1 4b Ao1 4 (Off air)
- Zhongshi
  - Guess Assistant Moderator (Off air)
- Next TV
  - Yi Shitang
- Qita
  - 2007 Taipei New Year's Eve Countdown Party
- EBC Eastern Super Vision
  - I Love The Man on behalf of the class presided over
- Chinese Television System
  - 10 Point Hall of Fame on behalf of the class presided over
- Hong Kong Now TV
  - 18/22 (with Blackie Chen and Tina Chou)
- MTV Taiwan
  - Wo Ai Ouxiang Idol of Asia (with Wu Jianheng and Liljay)

== Discography ==
=== Albums ===
- Blackie's Teenage Club (14 July 2006, Linfair Records)
- Meimei Simi De Yitian ─ Fenhong Gao Ya Dian (15 December 2006, Linfair Records)
- Meimei Simi Party (7 June 2007, Linfair Records)
- Brown Sugar Macchiato TV Soundtrack (CD+DVD) (31 August 2007, Gold Typhoon Capitol Music Group)
- Hey Girl Debut Album of the Same Name (29 August 2008, Warner Music Taiwan)

=== Music videos ===
Ouhan Sheng:

- Youxi Aiqing music video actress (song included in the album Dong Qilai, August 1999)

Rene Liu:

- Light (song included in the album A Whole Night, 9 December 2005)

Will Pan:

- Yi Zhi Shengong (song included in the album Gaoshou, 22 December 2005)

Kenji Wu:

- Nan Yong (song included in the album General Order, 13 October 2006)

Hey Girl-Fenhong Gao Ya Dian: (15 December 2006)

- Wo Yao Ai De Hao
- 123 Mutouren

Hey Girl:

- Wo Ai Hei Sei Se Hui (29 August 2008)
- Shake It Baby
- Xingfu De Pao Pao
- Jiao Jie Jie
- OOXX
- Nusheng
- Ha Ku Na Ma Ta Ta

Chang Jingxiang:

- Healthy Body (5 May 2017)

== Filmography ==
=== Dramas ===
Date	Network	Title	Role	Episode
15 Jul 2007	FTV, Star Chinese Channel	Brown Sugar Macchiato	Apple (Wu Yueping)	All
6 Oct 2007	woo.com (internet drama)	Heitang Laile	Apple	All
26 Jul 2008	Star Chinese Channel	The Legend of Brown Sugar Chivalries	Xiejiao Hufa	13
5 Dec 2011	CTS, GTV	The Pop Can Boy	Xiao Lan	1
9 Dec 2015	SET	Be With Me	Wo Ai Ouxiang host	2

== Bibliography ==
- Apple, Yao Yao-Jiemei Wangxiang Qu X Tou Chuan Gaogenxie

== Photo albums ==
- 2012
  - Apple Yao Yao Zimei Wangxiang Qu: Tou Chuan Gaogenxie Zhi Nu Nu Xiezhen Ji

== Advertising endorsements ==
- Edwin jeans
- New Shushan Swordsman Online
- Sushi Sushi
- Knights Bridge girl dress
- Le tea cherry micro-foam soda

== Programme announcements ==
- Guanjun Renwu
- Lady Commander
- Hot Door Night
- Mr. Player
- Super Followers (CTi Variety. CTi Entertainment)
- Tiantain Yue Caishen
- The Hunger Games
- Malan Tianhou Chuan
