= Candy Chen =

Si Ya
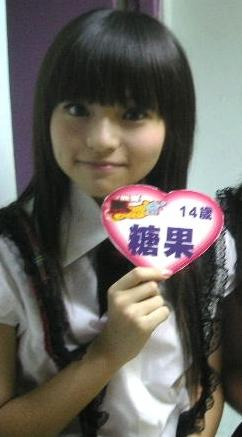
- Born: 3 January 1993 (age 32); Zhongli City, Taoyuan County (now Zhongli District, Taoyuan City), Taiwan
- Occupations: Dancer, host, actress, singer
- Years active: 2007–present
- Musical career
- Origin: Taiwan
- Genres: Mandopop, Mandarin Rap
- Website: Facebook; Weibo

Candy Chen (Chinese: 陳斯亞; born 3 January 1993) is a dancer, actress, host, singer, rapper and a model. She is featured on the Taiwanese variety shows: Blackie's Teenage Club and Blackie Lollipop. Candy was a member of the Taiwanese girl group Hey Girl from 2010 to 2011, and a member of Twinko from 2013 to 2016. She is 1/8th Dutch. She changed her name to Chen Yi-Ling in July 2012 to follow her mother's maiden name. Her English name becomes Nina Chen. In November 2013, she changed her name to Candy Chen (English Name) and Chen Si Ya (Chinese Name).

== Score in Blackie's Teenage Club ==
=== Elimination Match Show ===
- 2007-09-14：26th Elimination Match，1st Place.
- 2007-10-18：27th Elimination Match，1st Place.

=== Other Match Shows ===
==== 2007 ====
- 09-25：Special Project – 100% Lovely Priestress(特別企劃 100%的可愛教主) (Winner)
- 11-02：Interrogation Room – Undiscovered Beauty(偵查庭 深藏不露的美眉)
- 12–25：Playact Class – How to be a sweety girl(表演課 學習做個甜心女孩 – Cyndi寶貝模仿大賽) (Winner)

==== 2008 ====
- 03-11：Home Economics Class – Creative Cuisine Match(家政課 美眉創意料理大賽) (Winner)
- 07-10：Music Class – In Heart Love Song Prince(音樂課 唱到心坎裏的情歌王子) (Playact Winner)
- 07-11：Playact Class – Asian Dancing King(表演課 亞洲舞王) (Winner)
- 08-13: Beauty's Change(美眉們的蛻變) (2nd Place)

==== 2009 ====
- 04-02：Queen is Coming – Jolin's Successor Decision Match(天后駕到 蔡依林接班人決定戰) (Final Winner)

== Career ==
=== Host ===
- Channel V
  - 《Pop Beauty Wind》(美眉普普風)
    - Beauty Look World – Women Power(美眉看天下 女力天下(四))(2007-10-31，with Suan Wang)
    - Beauty Theme Pavilion – Dancing Queen(美眉主題館 舞后對決)(2007-11-06，with Suan Wang)
    - Beauty Theme Pavilion – Excellent Singer to be a Director(美眉主題館 歌而優則導)(2008-03-05)
    - Beauty KTV(美眉KTV)(2008-03-14)
    - Beauty Super Star's Day – Cyndi's Love Songs Day(美眉巨星日 王心淩情歌日)(2008-03-26，with Yako Chan)
    - Beauty Theme Pavilion – Live Show (ep.1)(美眉主題館 演唱會(一))(2008-April，with Ruby Lin)
    - Beauty KTV(美眉KTV)(2008-April，with Mamie Chen)
    - Beauty KTV(美眉KTV)(2008-May，with Candy Lai)
    - Beauty Theme Pavilion – Beauty Request Song(美眉主題館 美眉來點歌)(2008-05-29，with Candy Lai)
    - Beauty KTV(美眉KTV)(2008-06-06，with Candy Lai)
    - Beauty Theme Pavilion – Live Show (ep.2)(美眉主題館 演唱會(二))(2008-June，with Jessica Liao)
    - Beauty Theme Pavilion – Good Girl's Love Song(21st)(美眉主題館 好女生的情歌(二十一))(2008-June，with Hongshi)
    - Beauty KTV(美眉KTV)(2008-07-11，with Angel Hung)
    - Beauty Theme Pavilion – Second Shoot(21st)(美眉主題館 二連發 (二十一))(2008-08-27，with Candy Lai)
    - Beauty Pop Wind(美眉流行風)(2008-09-02，with Candy Lai)
    - Beauty KTV(美眉KTV)(2008-09-12，with Candy Lai)
    - Beauty Japan Wind(美眉東洋風)(2008-09-30)
  - 《Pop VJ Wind》(VJ普普風)
    - KT[V] Famous Love Song Of Jolin 2(蔡依林情歌經典 (二))(13 May 2009 )

=== Other Shows ===
- Channel V《Where 5.com》（2008-09-14）
- Gala Television Corp, GTV(八大綜合)《100% Entertainment Blackie Beauties – Old Girls VS New Girls 》(娛樂百分百 黑澀會美眉－舊妹vs新妹)（2008-06-06）

=== Live Show ===
- Lollipop "Lollipop" Live Show (The performing guest) (棒棒堂「哪裡怕」小巨蛋演唱會 表演嘉賓之一)（2008-01-26）

=== Magazine ===
- <FANS> 2008 Feb.（with Hongshi, Bella Cheng and Ruby Lin）

== Website Link ==
- Candy's Facebook
- Candy's Weibo, with her new Chinese name
