= Hsin Sheng College of Medical Care and Management =

Private college in Taoyuan, Taiwan

Coordinates: 24.8325°N 121.2067°E

- 新生醫護管理專科學校
- Motto: 博愛(Pe̍h-ōe-jī: Phok-ài)
- Type: Private, Junior College
- Established: 1971
- President: 陳清輝
- Students: 5,000
- Location: No. 418, Gaoping Sec., Zhongfeng Rd., Longtan, Taoyuan City 325, Taiwan
- Campus: Rural
- Website: www.hsc.edu.tw

Hsin Sheng College of Medical Care and Management (HSC; Chinese: 新生醫護管理專科學校; pinyin: Xīnshēng Yīhù Guǎnlǐ Zhuānkē Xuéxiào; Pe̍h-ōe-jī: Sin-seng I-hō͘ Koán-lí Choan-kho Ha̍k-hāu) is a private junior college in Longtan District, Taoyuan City, Taiwan. As a junior college approved by Ministry of Education, it offers two-year curriculum for vocational high school graduates and five-year curriculum for junior high school graduates. Upon successful completion of the study, students receive associate degrees. (Note: Since 2004, all junior colleges in Taiwan offer associate degrees under Article 29 of the Junior College Act.) In addition, it provides two-year vocational training for workers.

== History ==
HSC was initially established in 1971 as Hsin Sheng Senior Medical Vocational School (Chinese: 新生高級醫事職業學校). In 2005, it was restructured and renamed to Hsin Sheng College of Medical Care and Management.

== Teaching units ==
- Department of Nursing
- Department of Early Childhood Care and Education
- Department of Styling and Cosmetology
- Department of Marketing
- Department of International Business
- Department of Health and Leisure Management
- Department of Applied English
- Department of Applied Japanese
- Department of Long-term Care
- Department of Optometry

== Notable alumni ==
- Esther Huang, actress and singer
- Xiao Xun, member of Hey Girl

== See also ==
- List of universities in Taiwan
- Education in Taiwan
