= Yao Yao =

Yao Yao may refer to:

- Choi Hyo-joo, born Yao Yao, Chinese-South Korean table tennis player
- Yuri Huang, stage name Yao Yao, Taiwanese artist
- Kuo Shu-yao, nickname Yao Yao, Taiwanese actress and singer

== See also ==
- llaollao (pronounced as Yao Yao), a frozen yogurt franchise brand
- Yaoyao, (Chinese: 瑶瑶) a playable character voiced by Mai Kadowaki in Genshin Impact.
