= Painted Skin (TV series) =

- Promotional poster

Chinese name
- Traditional Chinese: 畫皮
- Simplified Chinese: 画皮
Transcriptions
Standard Mandarin
- Hanyu Pinyin: Huà Pí
- Genre: Supernatural, fantasy, romance
- Based on: Strange Stories from a Chinese Studio by Pu Songling
- Screenplay by: Lau Ho-leung
- Directed by: Danny Ko
- Presented by: Wang Maoliang; Ma Runsheng
- Starring: Fiona Sit; Tammy Chen; Gui Gui; Li Zonghan; Ling Xiaosu; Yang Mi; Law Kar-ying; Qi Yuwu; Dong Yijin; Xin Zhilei
- Opening theme: Wei Ai (唯愛; Only Love) performed by Fiona Sit and Hinson Chou
- Composer: Liu Chongyan
- Country of origin: China
- Original language: Mandarin
- No. of episodes: 36

Production
- Executive producers: Xu Benben; Dong Jun
- Producers: Zhang Heyun; Zhang Linlin
- Production location: Hengdian World Studios
- Running time: 45 minutes per episode
- Production companies: China International Television Corporation; Shenzhen Broadcasting Film and Television Corporation; China Broadcasting Film and Television Programme Trading Centre; First Media Shareholding; Guangzhou Fenglian Film Culture Broadcasting

Original release
- Network: TVS4
- Release: 3 March 2011

Painted Skin is a Chinese television series adapted from the 2008 film of the same title, which, in turn, is loosely based on a classic short story in Pu Songling's Strange Stories from a Chinese Studio. It was first broadcast on TVS4 on 3 March 2011 in mainland China.

A sequel series based on the second film, Painted Skin: The Resurrection, was broadcast in 2013.

== Cast ==
- Fiona Sit as Xiaowei / Xuxu
- Tammy Chen as Peirong
- Gui Gui as Xia Bing
- Li Zonghan as Pang Yong
- Ling Xiaosu as Wang Sheng
- Yang Mi as Xiaohong
- Law Kar-ying as Xia Yingfeng
- Qi Yuwu as Long Yun
- Dong Yijin as Xiaoyi
- Xin Zhilei as Susu
- Jiang Tianyang as Ye Yi
- Zhao Yi as Sha Luo
- Hai Bo as Wang Chengzhou
- Hinson Chou as Yu Zhi
- Han Zhenhua as Chen Huichuan
- Zhang Jin as Yuan Ren
- Lou Yajiang as Yang Gang
- Liu Chenxia as Peirong's mother

== Production ==
The production team of the 2008 film, Painted Skin, including its director and producer Gordon Chan, were involved in the planning and production of this television series. Chan mentioned that the television series would not be a repetition of the film, as the script used for the film would be revised, and more focus would be placed on the relationships between the main characters Xiaowei, Wang Sheng, Peirong, Pang Yong and Xia Bing. Shooting began on 8 September 2010 in Beijing and wrapped up in December.
