= Emma Wu =

Taiwanese singer and actress (born 1989)

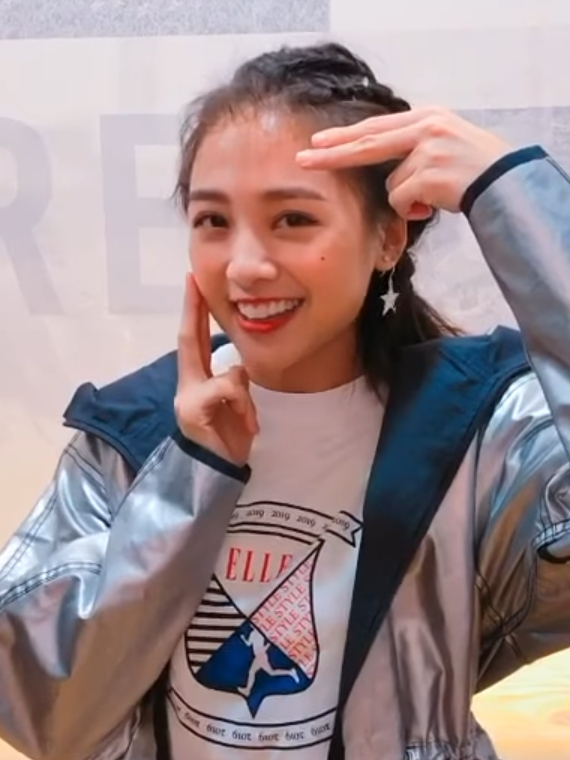
- Wu at the Elle Run with Style event in 2019
- Born: Wu Ying-chieh (吳映潔); 11 August 1989 (age 37); Keelung, Taiwan
- Occupations: Singer; actress
- Years active: 2005–present
- Children: 1
- Musical career
- Also known as: Gemma; Gui Gui (鬼鬼); Oh Young-gyul (오영결)
- Genres: Mandopop, K-pop
- Labels: Linfair Records; Warner Music Taiwan; CJ E&M; Gemma Wu Studio; Avex Taiwan
- Formerly of: Hey Girl

Wu Yingjie
- Traditional Chinese: 吳映潔
- Simplified Chinese: 吴映洁
Transcriptions
Standard Mandarin
- Hanyu Pinyin: Wú Yìngjié

Emma Wu Ying-chieh (Chinese: 吳映潔; pinyin: Wú Yìngjié; born 11 August 1989), also known as Gui Gui (Chinese: 鬼鬼; pinyin: Guǐ guǐ), is a Taiwanese singer and actress.

== Early life ==
Wu Ying-chieh, nicknamed Gui Gui, was born in Keelung City, Taiwan on 11 August 1989, and is the only child of divorced parents. In her early childhood, the family moved frequently, and this resulted in her having to attend five different elementary schools. Wu briefly attended the Dao Jiang Senior High School of Nursing & Home Economics (臺北市私立稻江高級護理家事職業學校) before transferring to Zhuangjing Senior Vocational School in the Xindian District of Taipei, where she became classmates with JPM's Wang Zi.

Regarding the origin of her alias, Gui Gui (literally: Ghost), Wu has explained that she is "full of reckless things" (Chinese: 古靈精怪) and adopted a phonological pun on the Chinese idiom (Chinese: "鬼”靈精怪) to describe herself as having an eccentric or impish personality.

== Career ==
=== 2005–2009: Variety and musical debut ===
In November 2005, Wu debuted as one of the original members of Blackie's Teenage Club (Chinese: 我愛黑澀會), a variety show seeking talents for the television network, Channel [V]. After three rounds of casting, Wu was recruited to join Hei Se Hui Mei Mei (Chinese: 黑澀會美眉), a nine-member Taiwanese girl group established c. 2006. Though the group's name was a clever play on the words "Hei She Hui" (Chinese: 黑社會; lit. 'black society', 'triad') and "Mei Mei" (Chinese: 妹妹; lit. 'sisters'), it was renamed Hey Girl (Chinese: 黑Girl) after a label change and the launch of their first self-titled album in August 2008.

In April 2009, Channel V's director, Andy Chang, responded to rumors of Wu leaving his agency. He expressed that though she was unlikely to renew her contract, the singer would partake in group activities per usual since Hey Girl's record contract did not belong to Channel V. Yet, despite Chang's statement, Wu was notably absent from their album promotions, and on 6 May 2009, he confirmed her departure from both Hey Girl and Channel V's management.

=== 2007–2015: Transition into acting ===
In 2007, Wu announced her acting debut with the idol drama, Brown Sugar Macchiato. However, the drama was viewed more as an "introductory chapter" to the two groups, Hey Girl and Lollipop F, than a major production. After thirteen episodes, the series ended on 7 October 2007, and an official soundtrack was released with songs from Lollipop and Hey Girl.

In 2008, Wu starred in Mysterious Incredible Terminator, opposite of Aaron Yan from Fahrenheit and Alien Huang. After the completion of M.I.T., Wu and Aaron, both widely praised for their on-screen chemistry and closeness, were to co-star in Taiwanese drama Momo Love. Yet, filming was halted due to Yan's scheduling conflicts, and once resumed, Wu and Aaron were replaced by Cyndi Wang and Jiro Wang, respectively.

Following a two-year hiatus, Wu signed with Polyface Entertainment Media Group in 2011 and returned to the small screen with I, My Brother (我和我的兄弟·恩). Later that year, Wu was cast in the television version of Painted Skin (TV series), in collaboration with Fiona Sit, Chen Yi Rong, and Li Zhong Han. It was also this opportunity that allowed Wu to shift her focus to the Chinese market.

In 2012, Wu debuted on the big screen with a three part-film series, The Four, starring Ronald Cheng, Anthony Wong, Deng Chao, and Liu Yifei. In February 2013, she was cast in the Korean reality show, We Got Married with Ok Taecyeon, of South Korean boy band 2PM, as her virtual husband. Regarding this experience, she has commented, "I feel thankful that you found me. I think the fact that I was able to do this show was a gift from the up above."

In the consecutive years, Wu has starred in Chinese TV dramas: Legend of Lu Zhen, Incisive Great Teacher (犀利仁師), A Different Kind of Pretty Man (不一樣的美男子), Roommate Diaries (一男三女合租記), The Four (2015 TV series), The Girl Wearing Tassel Earrings (戴流蘇耳環的少女) and The Legend of the Flying Daggers (飛刀又見飛刀 (2016年電視劇)).

=== 2016–present: Musical comeback ===
On 7 March 2016, Wu signed with CJ E&M and returned to the music scene. In preparation for her Korean debut, she underwent a rigorous 3-month training that included vocal, choreography and Korean lessons. On 26 September, Wu released her first official music video, Sugar Rush, and on 7 October, she launched her first self-titled EP, GEMMA. Introducing the extended play, Wu stated that GEMMA represented a new identity. "G" was derived from her nickname, Ghost (Chinese: 鬼鬼), while Emma is her proclaimed English name.

In June 2017, Wu parted ways with CJ E&M, and established her personal agency Gemma Wu Studio. In October of the same year, she released the single "Knock Knock Knock" after investing NT$8 million in production works herself.

In August 2019, Wu joined Avex Taiwan and released the single "Love Me Love Me" in celebration of her thirtieth birthday. On 22 September 2020, she released her first studio album GX to commemorate her 15th debut anniversary.

== Personal life ==
On January 10, 2025, Wu announced that she has given birth to a daughter but later clarified that she is not married and did not reveal the identity of the baby's father.

== Filmography ==
=== Television series ===
Year	Title	Role	Network	Notes/Ref.
2007	Brown Sugar Macchiato	Gui Gui (as herself)	FTV, Star Chinese Channel	Acting Debut
2008	The Legend of Brown Sugar Chivalries	Guardian of Cult	Star TV	Cameo, Ep. 13
2008	Mysterious Incredible Terminator	Li Xiao Xing / Tian Mo Xing	GTV	Female Lead
2009	K.O.3an Guo	Huang Yue Ying	FTV / GTV	Cameo, Ep. 44–46
2011	I, My Brother	Lu Wei Wei	CTV	Female Lead
2011	Painted Skin	Xia Bing	TVS4, ZJTV, GTV, Shenzhen Satellite TV	Supporting Role
2011	Love Recipe	Wang Mei Ya	CTV	Supporting Role
2012	Dream in Blue	Shen Xiao Qi	ZJTV	Supporting Role
2012	Summer Fever	Chen Wen Qing / Chen Tian Qing	CTV	Female Lead
2013	Female Prime Minister	He Dan Niang	Hunan TV	Supporting Role
2014	Incisive Great Teacher	Song Wen Wen	Dragon TV	Supporting Role
2014	A Different Kind of Pretty Man	Tong Yu Chen	Hunan TV	Female Lead
2014	Roommate Diaries	Li Mei Dai	Hunan TV	Supporting Role
2015	The Four (2015 TV series)	Ling Yi Yi	Hunan TV	Supporting Role
2015	The Girl Wearing Tassel Earrings	Ruan Qing Tian	Hunan TV, Anhui TV	Female Lead
2015	Slacker's Food Diary	Zhang An An	iQiyi, Viu (streaming media)	Female Lead
2016	The Legend of the Flying Daggers	Fang Ke Ke	Youku	Supporting Role
TBA	The Fairy Lady	Chen Xian Qi		Female Lead

=== Film ===
Year	Title	Role	Notes
2011	The Four	Ding Dang	Supporting Role
2013	The Four II	Ding Dang	Supporting Role
2014	The Four III	Ding Dang	Supporting Role
2015	Dream Holiday	Dani	Guest appearance
2016	Days of Our Own	Chen Yinuo	Supporting Role
2018	More than Blue	Bonnie	Guest appearance
2021	My Fairy Girl	Wu Xiao Xue	Female Lead

=== Variety shows ===
Year	Title	Notes
2005–2009	Blackie's Teenage Club	Ep. 79-958
2006–2007	Mo Fan Bang Bang Tang	Assistant host
2007	Mei Mei Pu Pu Feng	DJ
2007–2008	Fashion in House	Guest host
2009	Golden Taxi	Guest host
2009	Game GX	Guest host
2009	Mi Gu Celebrity School	Guest host
2010	Ultimate Player	Guest host
2011	Genius Go Go Go	Guest host
2013	We Got Married World Ver.	with Ok Taecyeon
2016	Who's the Murderer Season 1	Guest
2017	Who's the Murderer Season 2	Guest
2017	Fans! Fans!	Guest
2017	Who's the Murderer Season 3	Guest
2018	Twenty-Four Hours (TV series) Season 3	Guest
2018	Best Friends’ Perfect Vacation	Guest
2018	Back to Field Season 2	Guest
2018	Who's the Murderer Season 4	Guest
2019	Who's the Murderer Season 5	Guest
2020	Mr. Player	Guest

=== Theatre ===
Year	Title	Role	Notes
2020	Shamlet	Queen	Stage production at the National Theater in Taipei, Taiwan

=== Music video appearances ===
Year	Title	Artist(s)
2006	"Manservant (男傭)"	Kenji Wu
2009	"The Sky You Can't See (你看不到的天空)"	Evan Yo
2010	"Red"	Wallace Chung
2011	"Missing You"	Liu Zi Qian
2011	"Sticking to You"	Liu Zi Qian
2011	"Love's Secret Recipe (愛的秘方)"	Kenji Wu
2013	"Love Away from Me One Meter"	Hu Xia
2016	"Not Letting Go"	Ben Wu
2020	"I Think I Love You"	曹楊 Young
2021	"Still Alone"	黃偉晉 Wayne Huang

== Discography ==
=== Studio album ===
Title	Album details
GX	Released: 22 September 2020; Labels: Avex Taiwan; Formats: CD, digital download; Track listing: 1. GO; 2. Go Home, huh？ (你要不要先回家？); 3. Me, Myself and GEMMA (一個人跳舞); 4. Renee's Game (雷妮遊戲); 5. Gugoo Game (feat. Pikotaro); 6. What you gonna do (我是你的誰); 7. Love Me Love Me (啦咪啦咪); 8. Knock Knock Knock

=== Extended plays ===
Title	Album details
Gemma	Released: 7 October 2016; Labels: CJ E&M, Warner Music Taiwan; Formats: CD, digital download; Track listing: 1. Sugar Rush (Chn ver.); 2. Waiting For Your Love (等你愛); 3. Always (一直); 4. By My Side (愛在我身邊); 5. Sugar Rush (Kor ver.)

=== Singles ===
Title	Year	Peak chart positions	Album
Title	Year	CHN	Album
"Knock Knock Knock"	2017	—	GX
"Love Me Love Me"	2019	37	GX
"—" denotes releases that did not chart.

=== Collaborations ===
Year	Title	Other artist(s)	Album
2013	"I Love You"	Ok Taec-yeon	We Got Married Global Edition OST
2018	"Small Meteor" (小流星)	Silence Wang	200 Million Years Old Classmate OST

=== Soundtrack appearances ===
Year	Title	Album
2012	"Breaking Rules" (犯規)	Summer Fever OST
2012	"The Flavour Of Summer" (那年夏天的味道)	Summer Fever OST
2018	"Kitty Bomb"	More than Blue OST

== Awards and nominations ==
Year	Award	Category	Nominated work	Result	Ref.
2009	1st Degree Idol Drama Awards	Best Female Actress	Pi Li MIT	Won	
2009	1st Degree Idol Drama Awards	Best Onscreen Couple (with Aaron Yan)	Pi Li MIT	Won	
2013–2015	Sina Weibo Dream Valentines	Female Artist		Won	
2014	Taiwan CGC Award	Most liked Female Artist		Won	
2014	Taiwan EToday Award	Most popular Female Artist		Won	
2014	Asia Top Ten Goddess (Voting)	Number 4 in Asia	Actress	Won	
2016	Asia Top Ten Goddess (Voting)	Number 7 in Asia	Actress	Won	
2017	Hito Radio Music Awards	Best New Artist (vocal and dance)	Sugar Rush	Won	
2017	Asia Top Ten Goddess (Voting)	Number 9 in Asia	Actress and Singer	Won	
