= Yuri Huang =

Yuri Huang 黃喬歆
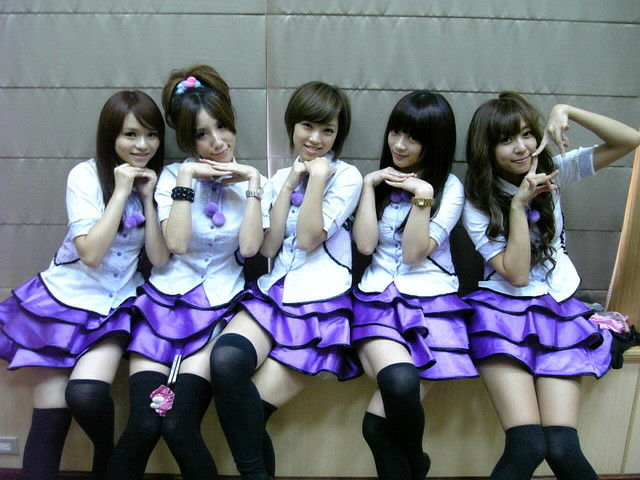
- Popu Lady

Background information
- Also known as: Yao Yao
- Born: Huang Chiao Hsin; 11 April 1986 (age 39); Xinwu District (Taoyuan City, new housing area), Taoyuan, Taiwan
- Occupation: Artist
- Years active: 2005–

Yuri Huang (Chinese: 黃喬歆; pinyin: Huáng Qiáoxīn; born 11 April 1986) formerly known as Huang Yuzhu (Chinese: 黃鈺筑; pinyin: Huáng Yùzhù) and Huang Yian (Chinese: 黃以安; pinyin: Huáng Yǐ'ān), and known by her stage name Yao Yao (Chinese: 瑤瑤), is a female singer, actress and model. She was born in Xinwu District, Taoyuan, Taiwan, and graduated from the School of Home Economics Chungli, Taoyan. Huang was a member of the girl group "Hey Girl" and debuted on 3 October 2005.

Her sister is Apple Huang, who is also a music artist. Together, they released a photobook titled 姊妹妄想曲：偷穿高跟鞋 .

== Works ==
=== Records ===
- 2008 Dummy Run

Dummy Run's music videos record Yao Yao's events in 2006.

== TV host ==
- Channel V
  - Blackie Lollipop
  - Blackie's Teenage Club
  - VJ Pu Pu Feng
  - Meimei Pu Pu Feng
  - Where 5.com (14 September 2008, her sister Apple was host for 21 September)
  - Wo Ai Ouxiang
- CTi Entertainment
  - Everybody Speaks Nonsenses II – Hot Pot (Assistant Moderator/Men Guo Nulang)
- SET Metro
  - The Gang of Kuo Kuan (Assistant Moderator)
- Hakka TV
  - Yao Yao Jiao Ni Shuo Ke Yu (6 October – 9 December 2008)
- Much TV
  - Danche Er Shili (25 October 2008 – Temporary hatch, it is only presided over a few episodes, but with its highest ratings)
- China Television
  - Zhouri Da Jingcai (Location moderator, 30 August 2008)
- Yahoo!
  - Yahoo Yule Bao (with her sister Apple; 8 July – 29 August 2013)
- Dragon Television
  - Mi Gu Mingxing Xueyuan (Assistant Moderator)
- IQiyi
  - Benpao Kaluli: Second Season guest (2016)
  - Ou Di Ge Shen A: First Season Kam group
  - Ou Di Ge Shen A: Second Season Kam group
  - Ou Di Ge Shen A: Third Season Kam group
- Jiangsu Television
  - Duanwu Jinqu Lao panelist (2016)
- Youku
  - Qianxing Zhe Jihua (2016)

=== Dramas ===
- Chinese Television System/Gala Television
  - 2006 Hanazakarino Kimitachihe Episode 11 (37:28-38:12) (Guest: as Liang Sinan's ex-girlfriend)
- EBC Yoyo
  - 2010 The M Riders1 (As Barbie)
- Next TV/China Vision
  - 2011 Material Queen (As Wang Dongxin Huan)

=== Short films ===
- 2014 Chao Pao Nulang

=== Music videos ===
- Light (included in the Rene Liu album A Whole Night, 9 December 2005)
- Yi Zhi Shengong (included in the Will Pan album Shishang Hun Yin Ku Yue, 22 December 2005)
- Chujia (included in the Terry Lin album Yuansheng Zhi Lu, 30 Dec 2005)
- 101 (included in the Fish Leong album Worship, 9 Nov 2007)

=== Magazines ===
- Juese Guangying magazine October 2007 cover character
- Cosmore Juese Banyan Yule Qingbao Zhi Vol.7 (June 2008) cover character

=== Photo albums ===
- 2012
  - Apple Yao Yao Wangxiang Qu: Tou Chuan Gaogenxie Zhi Nu Nu Xiehen Ji

=== Advertising ===
- Tsannkuen Signature article 38 Degrees article

== Programme announcements ==
- Huanle Zhiduoxing
- Guanjun Renwu
- Variety Together
- Hot Door Night
- Mr. Player
- Super Followers (CTi Variety. CTi Entertainment)
- Tiantian Yue Caishen
- The Hunger Games
