= MeiMei Kuo =

MeiMei
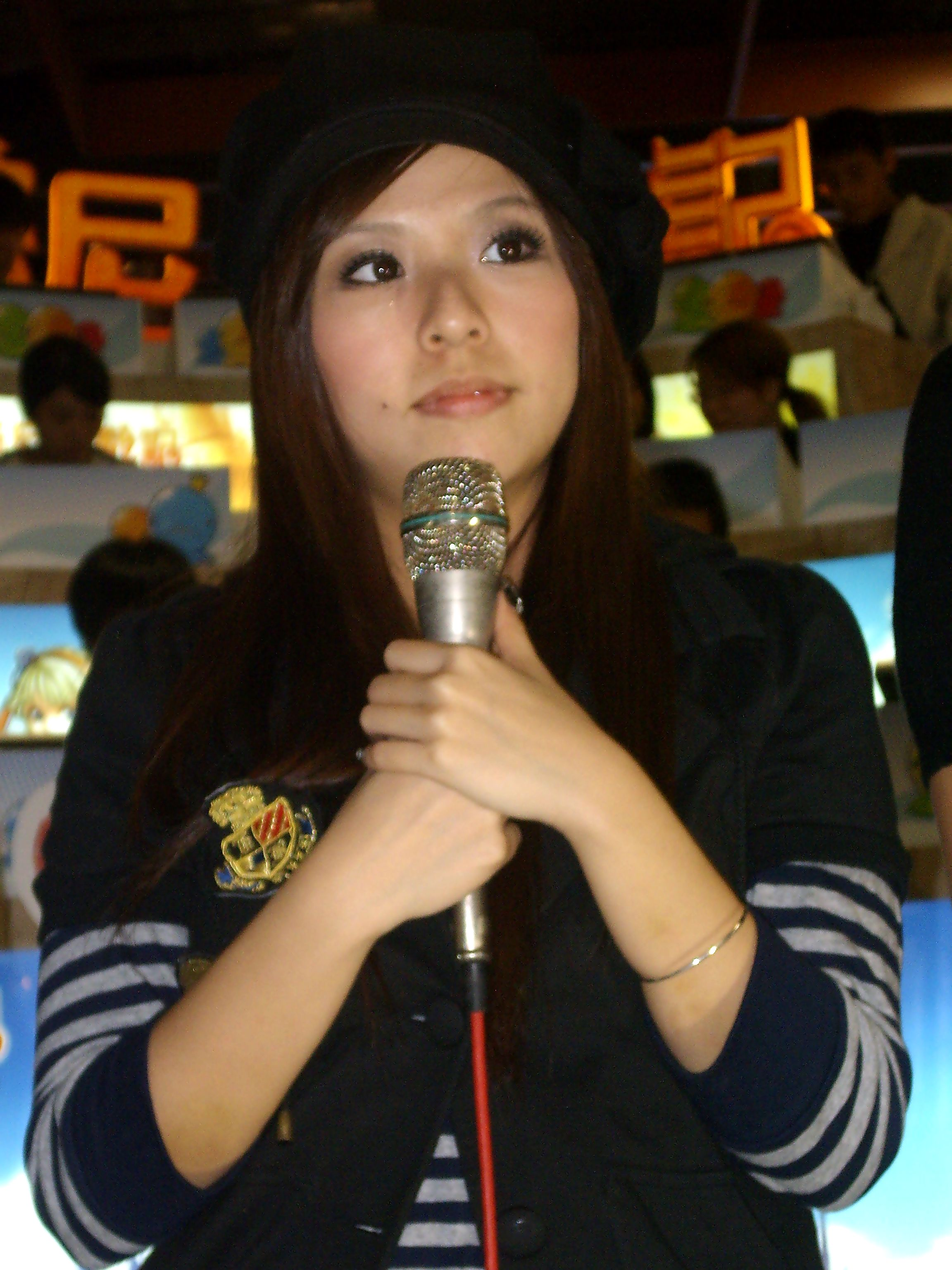
- Born: 16 August 1985 (age 40); Taipei, Taiwan
- Occupations: Singer, dancer, host, actress
- Years active: 2005–present
- Musical career
- Labels: Warner Music Taiwan Ltd.2008–2009
- Website: Woo.com

Kuo Chieh Chi (Chinese: 郭婕祈; pinyin: Guō Jiéqǐ), known professionally as MeiMei, is a Taiwanese actress who rose to fame as a member of girl band Hey Girl (formerly Hei Se Hui Mei Mei). MeiMei is the younger sister of Ulzzang model JieJie.

== Career ==
=== Host ===
- Channel V
  - 《Blackies》(我愛黑澀會)
  - 《Popular in House》(流行 in House)
  - 《Pop Beauty Wind》(美眉普普風)
  - 《Lollipop》(模范棒棒堂)(Assistant Host)
- TVBS-G
  - 《Entertainments News – Beauty Bao Bao》(娛樂新聞 ─ 美眉ㄅ ㄠ ˋㄅ ㄠ ˋ)
- China Television(Taiwan)
  - 《Guess》(我猜我猜我猜猜猜)(Assistant Host)
- Others
  - 《2007 Taipei Most HIGH New Year City Soiree》(2007台北最HIGH新年城跨年晚會)
  - <<Garena Talk>>(DJ Garena Talk Talk>

=== Endorsement ===
- Edwin Jeans
- New Zu Chivalry(新蜀山劍俠) Online
- Hi-Chew(「嗨啾」軟糖)
- Cheng-Hsien Gyrus Sushi(爭鮮迴轉壽司)
- Le tea cherry soda(「樂堤」cherry微發泡蘇打)
- KnightsBridge Clothes
- Pandora's Sweety Wardrobe Clothes(潘朵拉的甜蜜衣櫥服飾)
- Maybelline Moisturizing Lip Stick(媚必臨水唇膏)
- Yuskin Hand Cream
- Maidenform

=== Album ===
- I Love Blackies(我愛黑澀會) (2006-07-14, Linfair Records Ltd.)
- A Private Day of Beauty – Honey (美眉私密的一天 ─ 甜心轟炸機) (2006-12-15, Linfair Records Ltd.)
- Beauty Private Party (美眉私密Party) (2007-06-07, Linfair Records Ltd.)
- Brown Sugar Macchiato OST(黑糖瑪奇朵電視原聲帶) (CD+DVD) (2007-08-31, EMI Taiwan, Capitol Records Ltd.)
- Hey Girl(黑Girl首張同名專輯) (2008-08-29, Warner Music Taiwan Ltd.)

=== Music video ===
- 《Male Servant》男傭
- 《Blackie Teenage Club》我愛黑澀會
- 《Shining Kiss》
- 《Sunny doll》晴天娃娃
- 《Shake it Baby》
- 《The Brown Sugar Show》黑糖秀
- 《Happiness Bubbles》幸福的泡泡
- 《Call me JieJie》叫姊姊
- 《OOXX》
- 《Girl》女生
- 《Hakuna Matata》哈庫呐瑪塔塔

== Filmography ==
=== Drama/TV Series ===
Date	Channel	Name	Role	Functions
2007-07-15	FTV(民視); Star Taiwan(衛視中文台)	《Brown Sugar Macchiato》(黑糖瑪奇朵)	MeiMei(as herself)	Heroine
2007-10-06	Woo.com(Online Show)	《Here Comes Brown Sugar》(黑糖來了)	MeiMei	Heroine
2008-07-26	Star Taiwan(衛視中文台)	《The Legend of Brown Sugar Chivalries》(黑糖群俠傳)	Guardian Saintess(聖女護法)	Supporting actress

== Website Link ==
- Woo.com (Another Entrance)
