= Owodog =

Taiwanese actor and singer

OWOdog
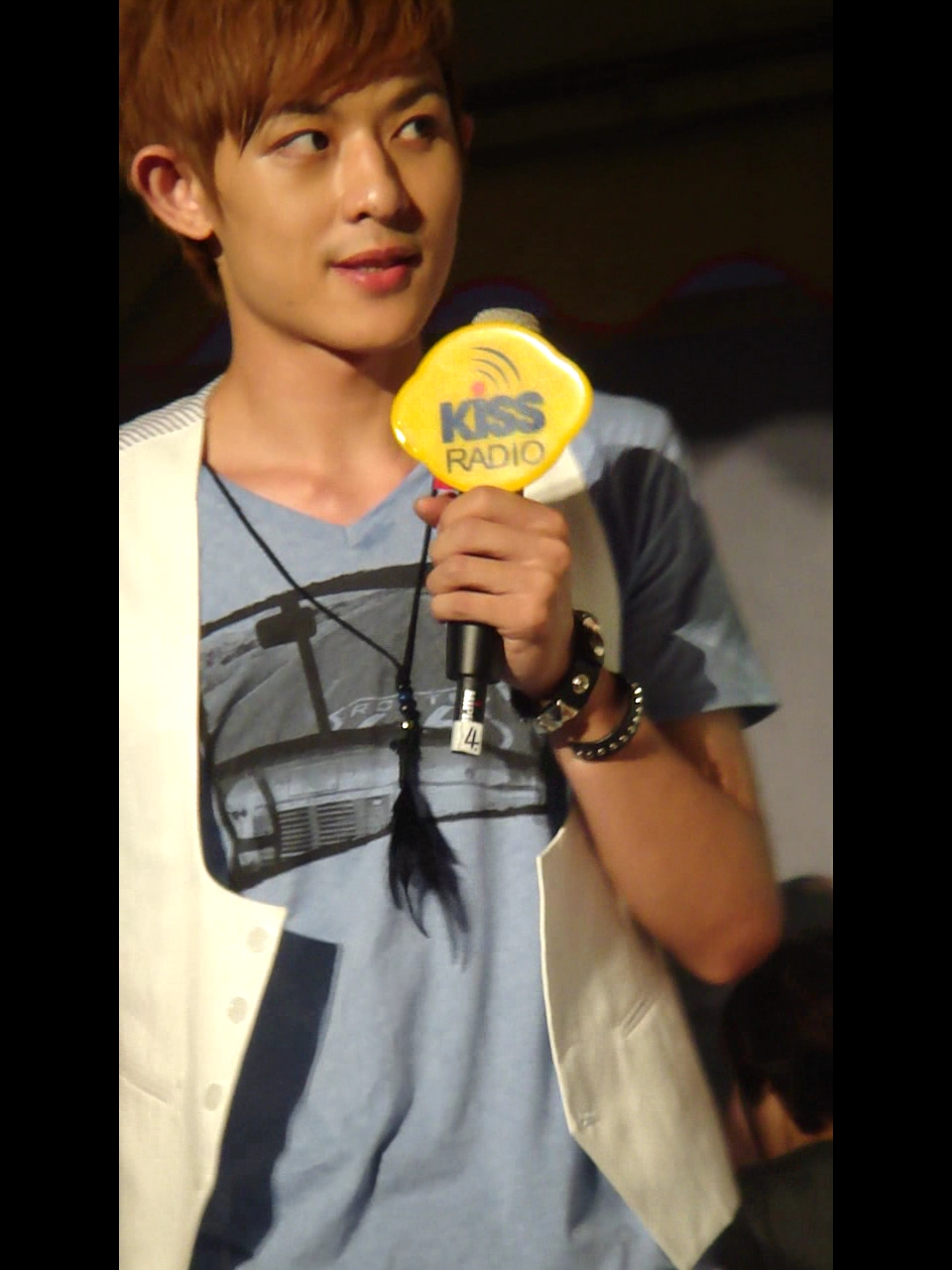
- OWOdog in Tainan, Taiwan on July 25, 2009 promoting I am Legend
- Born: 莊濠全; Chng Hô-choân; October 30, 1982 (age 43)
- Occupations: Singer, songwriter, dancer, actor, presenter
- Years active: 2006–present

Chinese name
- Chinese: 敖犬
Transcriptions
Standard Mandarin
- Hanyu Pinyin: Áo Quǎn
Southern Min
- Hokkien POJ: Ngô͘ Khián
- Musical career
- Origin: Republic of China (Taiwan)
- Genres: Mandopop
- Label: Gold Typhoon (formerly EMI Music)
- Website: Gold-Typhoon.com.tw, Lollipopf.net Official website and fan club

Owodog is a member of Lollipop F, a Taiwanese Mandopop boyband currently signed under the label Gold Typhoon (formerly EMI Capitol). The group consists of six members, all chosen in 2006 from Channel [V] Taiwan's show 模范棒棒堂 (Bang Bang Tang, or BBT), a show which sought to create new male artists in the entertainment business of Taiwan. Since then, Owodog has debuted as a singer, a host, an actor, and a short film director and has contributed three lyrics to the group's albums to date.

== Biography ==
=== Background ===
Owodog was born on October 30, 1982, in Taiwan, and his family consists of his parents and an older sister. Originally from Taichung, Owodog moved to Taipei when attending Takming University of Science and Technology, where he met Liljay. Since becoming members of Lollipop, they have transferred to Hsing Wu College. He currently lives with other members of the group in an apartment rented to them by BBT show host FanFan in Taipei, having moved several times since their debut.

Owodog, along with Liljay and A-Wei are members of Taiwanese breakdance group Black Angle Crew. Shortly after Owodog and Liljay joined Bang Bang Tang, the crew performed at 我愛黑澀會, the female version of BBT that debuted a year earlier on Channel V.

In 2006, Owodog became among the first group of boys to be selected into Bang Bang Tang after auditioning for the show in Taipei with Liljay. The show would officially debut on August 17, 2006, and he would be selected to act as the class leader in the show. For all three of the elimination contests before the selection, Owodog received first place. For one of these performances, he collaborated with Liljay.

==== The formation of Lollipop ====
On November 27, 2006, the episode in which the six members of the group were selected and revealed was aired. The order in which the members were announced is as follows: Liljay, Prince, Owodog, Fabien, William, and A-Wei. The members signed a contract to Channel V, and Dora Ao became their agent. The group, named Lollipop, then officially signed a contract with EMI Capitol on December 2, 2006. Owodog, being the leader in BBT, was named the group leader as well. On December 9, 2006, Lollipop made its first public performance as a group at the V-Power Music Storm Concert.

Lollipop first EP Colorful Lollipop was released on January 26, 2007, with six different covers, each featuring a member of the group. Four months later, on May 25, a second EP titled Summer's First Experience was released along with a photobook compiled with photos taken in Okinawa, as well as a DVD.

=== 2007–2008 ===
==== Acting and hosting debut ====
During the summer of 2007, members of Lollipop made their acting debut in the drama Brown Sugar Macchiato, a collaboration with Hey Girl, in which, Owodog acted as the oldest brother in the family. Because of the large number of main characters, fifteen in total, and the many obligations both groups had apart from the drama, the original director quit after directing five episodes. Nevertheless, the first episode was aired in Taiwan on July 15, 2007. Later, Lollipop admits on Kangsi Coming that the drama had been more of an introduction of the two groups instead of a major acting challenge, as the members were told to act like themselves, and that many subplots were explained only briefly due to the large number of main characters. After thirteen episodes, the drama ended on October 7, 2007. Additionally, an official soundtrack was released with songs from Lollipop and Hey Girl.

The same year, Lollipop began hosting their own show Lollipop Gyashan (LOLLIPOP哪裡怕) on October 27 until April 19, 2008, when the show stopped airing.

==== Official debut album and concert ====
Lollipop's debut album Gyashan (Chinese: 哪裡怕; pinyin: Nǎli Pà) was released on December 28, 2007. Gyashan entered Mandarin charts in the number one position, outselling F4's album Waiting for You – Await Your Love (在這裡等你) released the same day.

On January 26, 2008, a year after the release of their first EP, Lollipop held its debut concert at the Taipei Arena. The concert DVD was released on June 6, 2008, breaking chart records with sales rates of more than 35%. The DVD has topped the charts for a period of one month since. Due to copyright issues, Owodog's tribute to Michael Jackson could not be included in the DVD, but was aired on Bang Bang Tang.–

=== 2008–2009 ===
==== Graduation from Bang Bang Tang ====
Lollipop had been appearing regularly on Bang Bang Tang since August 14, 2006. With Channel [V]'s decision to select a new batch of boys and create a second season, Owodog and most of the other members "graduated" from Bang Bang Tang. For his last performance, another tribute to Michael Jackson's Ghosts and a collaboration with members of 我愛黑澀會, Owodog received first place. Their last official episode aired on August 29, 2008, marking the end of the first season. In total, the members of Lollipop had participated in more than 500 episodes of the show. Since the start of Bang Bang Tang II, Owodog had, on several occasions, returned to the show as a guest or a co-host.

==== Drama, hosting, film, and other performing opportunities ====
Owodog guest starred in the dramaThe Legend of Brown Sugar Chivalries, which starred other members of Lollipop and Hey Girl that had debuted July 26, 2008, on Star TV Chinese Channel. On October 3, 2008, the original soundtrack was released by Gold Typhoon.

At the same time, he also began hosting Na Li Wu Da Kang (哪裡5打坑) with Liljay, Awei, Hey Girl's Apple, and Channel V's VJ Rong Jia. The show has ended around December 2008.

Having performed in Singapore a week before, the group returned to Taiwan to participate in the 2008 V-Power Love Music Concert on November 29, 2008. The concert united Liljay, Owodog, and A-wei with other Black Angle Crew members for a dance performance. Together, the six members of Lollipop performed five songs. Lollipop's participation in the concert also marks, symbolically, the second anniversary of the group's formation.

A week later, on December 6, 2008, Lollipop performed four songs with themes of wushu at the 45th Golden Horse Awards ceremony.

After talks with Paco Wong in 2008, the chairman of Gold Records, Owodog is starring in a kung fu film called Hot-blooded Union (熱血同盟) with Theresa Fu and a member of The Flowers. The film has started filming near the end of 2008 in Beijing. Later news also reveal that A-Wei, who impressed the director with his wushu skills, has been invited to guest star in the film. The name of the film has since been changed to Martial Spirit (武動青春), and a trailer was shown at Lollipop's I am Legend concert in Hong Kong.

As one of Channel [V]'s Chinese New Year programs, a short film called 狼牙棒 aired on January 26, 2009. The short film is produced by Owodog, along with bandmates William and A-Wei, starring also in the film themselves.

==== Bang Bang Tang III ====
In February, 2009, Channel [V] began filming its revamped version and new season of Bang Bang Tang, which marked the return of several members from the first season, including Owodog. For the new season, Owodog shot and directed a promotional ad of members dancing at several sites in Taipei with Aben of Choc7. Bang Bang Tang III began airing on March 2, 2009, with Show Lo being the first guest star. In 2009, Lollipop, as a group, made its first lyric contributions to other artists, which are included in the mini album of the group Choc7, composed of seven members selected from the same show.

=== 2009–present ===
==== I Am Legend: Second album and Asia tour ====
Lollipop's second album I Am Legend was released on June 19, 2009. For the album, Owodog wrote the lyrics to the song "綜藝咖" and co-wrote the lyrics for the title song "I Am Legend" with Prince, as well as, "One Way" with Liljay. A concert tour in Asia with the same name as the album commenced in Hong Kong Coliseum on July 4 and July 5, 2009.

While promoting I Am Legend on several Taiwanese variety shows, including Kangxi Lai Le, 100% Entertainment, Azio Superstar, etc., Owodog and other members of Lollipop created a series of dance performances specifically for the show hosts of each show, thus completing a mini TV tour.

==== End of Bang Bang Tang ====
With show host FanFan leaving the show to focus on her musical career, Bang Bang Tang's last episode was aired on July 30, 2009. This marks the end of Owodog's participation in the show.

==== Call Me by Fire ====
In 2021, he joined the cast of Call Me by Fire as a contestant. He was subsequently eliminated in episode 9.

== Discography ==
=== Albums ===
Album	Name	Release date	Label
1st	Gyashan; Chinese: 哪裡怕; pinyin: Nǎli Pà	December 28, 2007	EMI Music
	Gyashan – Limited Edition; Chinese: 哪裡怕 – 限量炫光珍藏版; pinyin: Nǎli Pà – Xiàn Liàng Xuàn Guāng Zhēn Cáng Bǎn	February 1, 2008	EMI Music
2nd	I Am Legend; Chinese: 我是傳奇; pinyin: Wŏ Shì Chuán Qí	June 19, 2009	Gold Typhoon
	Lollipop's I Am Legend + Choc7's Sonic Youth; Chinese: 卒業紀念限定盤 (合體雙拼改版); pinyin: Cù Yè Jì Niàn Xiàn Dìng Pán (Gĕ Tĭ Shuāng Pīn Găi Băn)	August 14, 2009	Gold Typhoon

=== EPs ===
Album	Name	Release date	Label
1st	Colorful Lollipop; Chinese: 七彩棒棒堂; pinyin: Qī Cǎi Bàng Bàng Táng	January 26, 2007	EMI Music
	Colorful Lollipop – Special Edition; Chinese: 七彩棒棒堂 – 無敵慶功版; pinyin: Qī Cǎi Bàng Bàng Táng – Wú Dí Qìng Gōng Bǎn	March 9, 2007	EMI Music
2nd	Summer's First Experience; Chinese: 夏日初體驗; pinyin: Xià Rì Chū Tǐ Yàn	May 25, 2007	EMI Music
3rd	I Am Legend 2009 ASIA TOUR Special Issue; Chinese: 我是傳奇2009亞洲巡迴演唱會-寫真限定單曲; pinyin: Wǒ Shì Chuán Qí 2009 Yà Zhōu Xún Huí Yǎn Chàng Huì – Xiě Zhēn Xiàn Dìng Dān Qǔ	February 6, 2010	Gold Typhoon

=== Original soundtracks ===
Album	Name	Release date	Label
1st	Brown Sugar Macchiato – OST; Chinese: 黑糖瑪奇朵 – 原聲帶; pinyin: Hēi Táng Mǎ Qí Duǒ – Yuán Shēng Dài	August 31, 2007	EMI Music
2nd	The Legend of Brown Sugar Chivalries (Limited Edition) – OST; Chinese: 黑糖群俠傳 (群俠包袱限量版) – 電視原聲帶; pinyin: Hēi Táng Qún Xiá Chuán (Qún Xiá Bāofu Xiàn Liàng Bǎn) – Diàn Shì Yuán Shēng Dài	October 3, 2008	Gold Typhoon
	The Legend of Brown Sugar Chivalries – OST; Chinese: 黑糖群俠傳 (型男奇俠版) – 電視原聲帶; pinyin: Hēi Táng Qún Xiá Chuán (Xíng Nán Qí Xiá Bǎn) – Diàn Shì Yuán Shēng Dài	October 9, 2008	Gold Typhoon

=== Concert DVDs ===
Album	Name	Release date	Label
1st	The Dream Embarks – Sparkling Taipei Arena Concert; Chinese: 夢想出發 – 閃耀小巨蛋演唱會; pinyin: Mèng Xiǎng Chū Fā – Shǎn Yào Xiǎo Jù Dàn Yǎn Chàng Huì	June 6, 2008	EMI Music

=== Lyrics contributions ===
Release date	Album	Song title	Performer
2009-05-29	Sonic Youth	《太青春》	Choc7
2009-06-19	I Am Legend	綜藝咖; 我是傳奇 I Am Legend; One Way	Lollipop

== Filmography ==
=== Television series ===
Year	English name	Chinese name	Role
2006	Express Boy	惡男宅急電	Cameo – PUB dancing guests
2006	White Robe of Love	白袍之戀	Extended cast
2006	The Magicians of Love	愛情魔法師	Cameo
2007	Brown Sugar Macchiato	黑糖瑪奇朵	敖犬 Owodog
2008	The Legend of Brown Sugar Chivalries	黑糖群俠傳	洪十八 Eighteen Hung
2010	Untold Stories of 1949	大江大海一九四九	Young Chiang Kai-shek
2010	Gloomy Salad Days	死神少女	A Jie (阿介)
2011	"Love Keeps Going"	美樂。加油	Big Star
2013	"PMAM"		戴維君(戴大藍)
2013	First Kiss	真愛配方	Yan Yi Fei
2014	Shenzhen Roommate Diaries	深圳合租记	Hua Qiang

=== Films ===
Year	English name	Chinese name	Role
2008	Truth or Dare: 6th Floor Rear Flat 2	六樓后座2	Guest star
2009	Martial Spirit	武動青春	高大偉 David Kao
2011	Summer Love	戀夏戀夏戀戀下	阿犬
2011	You Are the Apple of My Eye	那些年，我們一起追的女孩	Tsao Kuo-sheng
2013	Machi Action	變身	Face
2013	Get Together	逗陣ㄟ	Kindergarten Teacher
2016	Girls' Generation		
2019	Nezha Returns		
2019	Erlang Shen		

=== Short films ===
This table includes short films that are directed and produced by members of Lollipop, which were aired on Channel [V] independently (i.e. not as part of the show Bang Bang Tang).

Year	Name	Role
2009	狼牙棒	Actor, producer, editor

=== Variety shows ===
Premiere date	Channel	Name
August 18, 2006	Channel V Taiwan	模范棒棒堂 Bang Bang Tang
October 27, 2007	Channel V Taiwan	LOLLIPOP哪裡怕
September 7, 2008	Channel V Taiwan	哪裡5打坑
August 12, 2021	Mango TV China	披荆斩棘的哥哥 Call Me By Fire

== Concert appearances ==
This list does not include year-end galas or autograph/performance sessions.

=== Lollipop's concerts ===
Date	English name	Chinese name	Notes
January 26, 2008	Lollipop Taipei Arena Concert	哪裡怕 台北小巨蛋演唱會	Debut concert
July 4–5, 2009	Lollipop "I am Legend" Asia Tour: Hong Kong	棒棒堂《我是傳奇》亞洲巡迴演唱會- 香港站	First stop of Asia Tour
December 12, 2009	Lollipop "I am Legend" Asia Tour: Guangzhou	棒棒堂《我是傳奇》亞洲巡迴演唱會- 廣州站	

=== Appearances as guests ===
Date	English name	Chinese name	Notes
April 21, 2007	Stefanie Sun celebratory concert	孫燕姿慶功演唱會	Guest
February 23, 2008	Show Lo Show on Stage Concert	羅志祥一支獨秀演唱會	Guest for first HK show; First concert performance in Hong Kong
November 1, 2008	"We Are Friends" FanFan Concert	我們是朋友 范瑋琪 2008巡迴演唱會	Guest for Taipei show
August 19, 2009	FanFan F.One "We are Friends" Concert	范瑋琪F.one我們是朋友香港北京巡迴演唱會	Guest for Hong Kong show

=== Other concerts ===
This table consists of concerts where Lollipop is one of many artists who performed.

Date	English name	Chinese name	Notes
December 9, 2006	V-Power Music Storm Concert	V-Power 音樂風暴演唱會	First public performance as Lollipop; Hosted by Channel V and leTea
June 9, 2007	Kaoshiung LeParty	高雄樂派對	Hosted by Channel V and leTea
October 27, 2007	MTV Concert	MTV樂翻天演唱會	Hosted by MTV and leTea
March 1, 2008	2008 HITO Music Awards Concert	2008 HITO流行音樂獎暨萬人演唱會	Hosted by Hit FM
June 1, 2008	Artistes 512 Fundraising Campaign	演藝界512關愛行動	Fundraising campaign in Hong Kong for the Sichuan earthquake
July 4, 2008	Maokong Gondola Concert	貓纜演唱會	Hosted by TRTC
November 29, 2008	V-Power Love Music Concert	V-Power 愛音樂演唱會	Hosted by Channel V and McDonald's
January 31, 2009	Kaoshiung Lantern Festival Opening Night	犇牛迎世運‧高雄愛幸福「開幕之夜」	Hosted by Kaoshiung city government
October 6, 2009	11th Chinese/Korean Music Festival	第十一屆中韓歌會	Performance in Qingdao

== Endorsements/Commercial appearances ==
Year	English name	Chinese name
2006	566 Shampoo	566 洗髮精
2006	KFC	肯德基
2006	Edwin Denim	Edwin 牛仔褲
2006	NIKE shoes	NIKE 耐吉是專屬球鞋代言
2007	leTea Melon soda drink	leTea melon哈蜜瓜微發泡蘇打汽水
2007	Formosa Eyewear	寶島眼鏡
2007	MSN Live Earth	MSN愛護地球環保大使
2007	Harry Potter and the Deathly Hallows Mandarin version	哈利波特第7集中文版
2008	Levi's Denim	Levis 牛仔褲
2008	Taiwan Dairy Association	中華民國乳業協會
2008	Hong Kong '唯舞獨尊Online' Game	《唯舞獨尊Online》香港版
2008	China Youth Innovation Competition	創業戰鬥格大賽
2008	Adidas – Euro 2008	歐錦賽"拍就隊EURO BUS"
2008	Formosa Eyewear	寶島眼鏡
2008	Noordhoff Craniofacial Foundation	羅慧夫顱顏基金會
2008	OLD & NEW (Clothing)	鎏恆色
2009	Noordhoff Craniofacial Foundation	羅慧夫顱顏基金會

== Awards ==
Awards received as part of Lollipop

Year	English name	Chinese name
2007	SINA MUSIC Most Popular Awards – My Favourite New Group (Silver)	SINA MUSIC樂壇民意指數頒獎禮 – 我最喜愛新組合(銀獎)
2007	Canada HIT Chinese Billboard – Nation's Recommended New Group	加拿大至HiT中文歌曲排行榜 – 全國推崇新組合
2008	Hito Radio Music Awards – HITO Male Group of the Year	Hito流行音樂獎 – HITO男團體
2008	TVB8 Awards – Best Group	TVB8金曲榜 – 最佳組合獎
2009	Metro Radio Awards – Best Group; Metro Radio Awards – Nation's Most Popular Group	新城國語力頒獎禮2009 – 新城國語力組合; 新城國語力頒獎禮2009 – 新城國語力全國最受歡迎組合
