= Esther Huang =

Taiwanese actress and singer

- 黃瀞怡
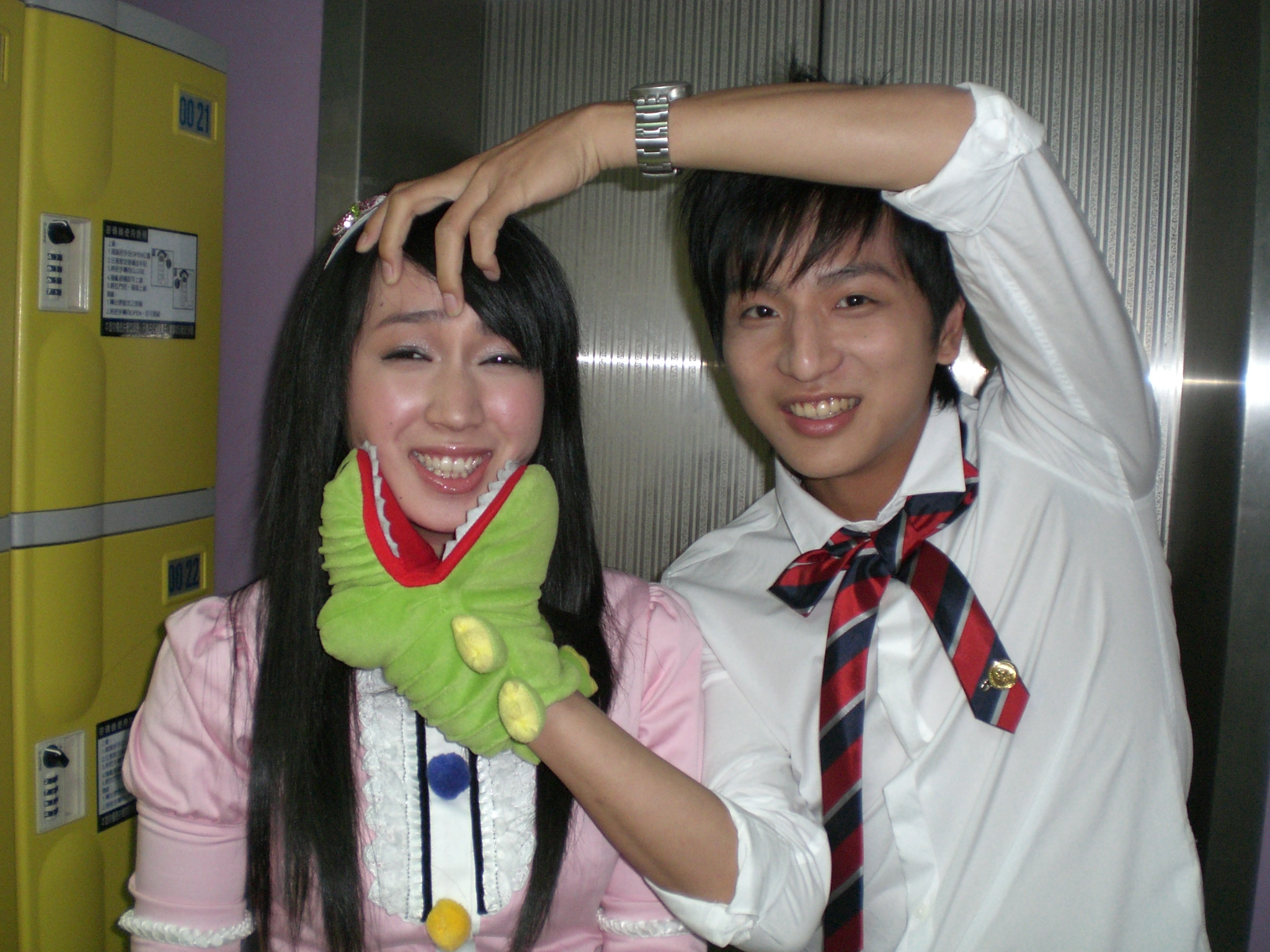
- Huang (left) in 2006
- Born: Huang Ching-i; 27 February 1989 (age 37); Longtan, Taoyuan County, Taiwan
- Education: Hsin Sheng College of Medical Care and Management
- Occupations: Actress, singer
- Years active: 2005–present

Chinese name
- Traditional Chinese: 黃瀞怡
- Simplified Chinese: 黄瀞怡
Transcriptions
Standard Mandarin
- Hanyu Pinyin: Huáng Jìngyí
- Musical career
- Also known as: Albee Huang; Xiao Xun
- Genres: Mandopop
- Labels: Linfair Records (2006-2007); Warner Music Taiwan

Esther Huang (born 27 February 1989), formerly known as Albee Huang, is a Taiwanese actress and singer. She is a former member of the Taiwanese girl band Hey Girl. She is sometimes known as Xiao Xun in the media along with other pseudonyms.

== Career ==
Huang is in a girl group originally known as Hei Se Hui Mei Mei which underwent a name change to Hey Girl. Hey Girl consisted of seven other girls, and they are known to work with another popular Taiwanese boyband, Lollipop. Huang has also worked with Ah Ben from Choc7 in The Teen Age.

== Filmography ==
=== Television series ===
- 2006: Angel Lover - Episode 3
- 2007: Brown Sugar Macchiato- Xiaoxun
- 2007: The Teen Age - Xia Nian Qiao
- 2008: Rolling Love - Wasabi
- 2008: The Legend of Brown Sugar Chivalries - Ren Ying Ying
- 2011: Love Keeps Going - Han Yi Fei
- 2011: Love You
- 2011: Rookies' Diary
- 2012: What Is Love
- 2012: Love Me or Leave Me (TV series)
- 2014: Fabulous 30
- 2014: Dear Mom
- 2015: Love or Spend
- 2017: See You in Time

=== Film ===
- Double Trouble (2012)
- Love Is Sin (2012)
- The Ideal City (2013)
- Knight of Cups (2013)
- Hang in There, Kids! (2016)
- Binding Souls (2018)
- Hidden Treasures in the Mountain (2018)
- Han Dan (2019)
- Gaga (2022)
- The Embers (2024)
- The Taste of Pork Belly (2025)

=== Music video appearances ===
- "I Love Blackie" - (Mei Mei Private Diary)
- "Shining Kiss" - (Mei Mei Private Day - Tian Xin Hong Jia Ji)
- "Shake it baby" - (Mei Mei Private Day - Tian Xin Hong Jia Ji)
- "Sunny Dolls" - (Mei Mei Private Day - Tian Xin Hong Jia Ji)
- "Sweet Sweet Circle / Donuts" - (18 Jin Bu Jin OST)
- "Happiness Bubbles" - (Mei Mei Private Day)
- "Brown Sugar Show" - (Brown Sugar Macchiato OST)
- "Jiao Jie Jie" - (Hey Girl)
- "OOXX" - (Hey Girl)
- "Nu Sheng" - (Hey Girl)
- "哈庫吶瑪塔塔" - (Hey Girl)
- "Slow For Half a Beat" - (黃靖倫 Jing Huang)
- "Hey Girl" - ( 黑Girl)
- "Lovers and Friends" - ( 黑Girl)

== Discography ==
=== Studio albums ===
- 2008 - Hey Girl (首張同名專輯)

=== Extended plays ===
- 2006 - Wo Ai Hei Se Hui mei mei (我愛黑澀會)
- 2006 - Mei Mei Si Mi De Yi Tian - Fen Hong Gao Ya Dian/Tian Xin Hong Jia Ji (美眉私密的一天-粉紅高壓電/甜心轟炸機)
- 2007 - Mei Mei Si Mi Party (美眉私密Party)
- 2011 - Hey Girl (黑 Girl)

=== Soundtrack appearances ===
- 2007 - 18 Jin Bu Jin OST (18禁不禁電視原聲帶)
- 2007 - Brown Sugar Macchiato OST (黑糖瑪奇朵原聲帶)
- 2008 - The Legend of Brown Sugar Chivalries OST (黑糖群俠傳電視原聲帶)
