= Brown Sugar Macchiato =

- Brown Sugar Macchiato promotional poster
- Also known as: 黑糖瑪奇朵; Hēitáng Mǎqíduǒ
- Genre: School, Comedy, Teen Drama, Romance, Slice of life
- Written by: Su Da-i / Wu Wei-chun / Chang Wan-ni
- Directed by: Wang Ming-tai (王明台) / Chen I-hsian / Lian Shu-hsian
- Starring: Ao Chuan; Wang Chi; Hsiao Yu; Hsiao Chieh; Wei Lian; A-Wei; Jung Chia; Gui Gui; Ya Tou; Pei Tong Tong; Da Ya; Hsiao Xun; MeiMei; Hsiao Man; Ning Er; Apple; Na Tou
- Opening theme: "黑糖秀" (Brown Sugar PK Show) by Lollipop F and Hey Girl
- Ending theme: "愛情瑪奇朵" (Love Macchiato) by Lollipop F
- Country of origin: Taiwan
- Original language: Mandarin
- No. of episodes: 13

Production
- Producer: Lian Shuxian / An Jinghong
- Production location: Taipei
- Cinematography: Huang Fengming (黃峰銘)
- Running time: approx. 70 minutes (Sundays at 21:30)

Original release
- Network: Formosa Television (FTV)
- Release: 15 July – 7 October 2007

Related
- The Legend of Brown Sugar Chivalries

Brown Sugar Macchiato (Chinese: 黑糖瑪奇朵; pinyin: Hēitáng Mǎqíduǒ) is a Taiwanese drama starring members of Taiwanese bands Lollipop F and Hey Girl. It was first broadcast in Taiwan on free-to-air Formosa Television (FTV) from 15 July 2007 to 7 October 2007 and cable TV STAR Chinese Channel. It was also broadcast in China on Xing Kong.

== Relationships ==
- Ao Chuan is seemingly coupled with Tong Tong and Mei Mei initially but ends up with Da Ya.
- Wang Zi is in love with Rong Jia and initially paired up with Xiao Xun, but ends up as a couple with Gui Gui.
- Xiao Yu is seemingly coupled with Mei Mei at her birthday party but he rejects her because he likes Xiao Xun and he is coupled with Xiao Xun in the end.
- Xiao Jie likes Ya Tou in the beginning and his rival is his younger brother Ah Wei who also likes Ya Tou. He falls in love with Xiao Jie (Ya Tou's friend) when he helped her in the school competition.
- Wei Lian has a crush on Rong Jia. Rong Jia is initially hesitant and refuses him, but slowly learns to accept him after Wang Zi rejects her.
- Ah Wei is in love with Ya Tou and has a rivalry with his fourth brother (Xiao Jie). He later becomes a couple with Ya Tou.

== Synopsis ==
Six boys with different personalities and backgrounds are notified that they share the same father. On top of that, they are entitled to a huge inheritance. However, there is only one catch: they must attend the same school and live together in the same house for a year. In the end, they become from total strangers to close brothers, as well as making themselves adaptable to the changes in their life.

However, the six brothers not only have to deal with their uneasiness and dislike for one another, but also everything the ten mean girls (Tong Tong, Da Ya, Gui Gui, Ya Tou, Hsiao Hsun, Hsiao Man, Apple, MeiMei, Hsiao Chieh and Ko En) would do to make their school days a living hell for them. Unknown to the other nine girls, Ya Tou is actually the housekeeper of the brothers' mansion.

To add to their stress, someone is after their inheritance, trying to make them break their contract, and is sending people to their school to do so. Meanwhile, love blossoms among the brothers and their classmates.

== Cast ==
=== Class 206 ===
==== The Brothers ====
The Brothers is played by boy group Lollipop F.

- Owodog Chuang as Ao Chuan (敖犬; Áo Quǎn) – The eldest brother and leader of the brotherhood. Cool, athletic, funny, and responsible. He usually acts as spokesperson for the younger brothers. Ao Chuan became the class president after he outdid Tong Tong for the boys' justice, but later lost it to Hsiao Ma in an election. When Hsiao Ma returned to America, his position as class president was returned.
  He dates the spokesperson for the girls in their class, Da Ya. They separated shortly after she found out about his true relationship to his brothers and Ya Tou, but reunited on Ya Tou's birthday.
- Prince Chiu as Wang Chi (王子; Wáng Zǐ) – The second brother. Calm, smart, and elegant. He tends to act cold in front of everybody. Sometimes, he would take the lead for his brothers when Ao Chuan is in a bind, and sometimes he is the cook of the family.
  He takes admiration in Hsiao Hsun, who shares his personalities and intelligence, but ends up dating the mischievous Gui Gui, who won his heart by staying beside him. He first confesses his feelings when he and Ya Tou are led to believe that Gui Gui had cancer, which turned out to be a mistaken report.
- Fabien Yang as Hsiao Yu (小煜; Xiǎo Yù) – The third brother. His passion for music is the only thing that matters to him, and is a leading member of the music band "Be-Cool". Of all the brothers, he is the only one who is in no interest of inheriting his father's money. But after some bonding with his brothers, he becomes willing to help them out.
  He has a crush on the class' smartest girl, Hsiao Hsun, but she despises him for his ignorance. At the same time, he becomes friends with another girl named MeiMei. After he "saves" Hsiao Hsun from a gang of mobsters, her heart is won by him.
- LilJay Liao as Hsiao Chieh (小傑; Xiǎo Jié) – The fourth brother. Sporty and athletic. He lost his memory at one point in the story in a rollerskating contest, but eventually recovers.
  He has a crush on their housekeeper, Ya Tou, and always fights with A-Wei for her affection. But in the end, he ends up becoming a couple with the clumsy Hsiao Chieh (筱婕) when she confesses to him. Their names often cause confusions in their class.
- William Liao as Wei Lian (威廉; Wēi Lián) – The fifth brother. Naïve and kind, but lacks brain cells. His hobby involves bicycling.
  Wei Lian has a crush on Rong Chia, who is one older year than he is. Though she looks at him as a little brother at first, he eventually wins her heart with his naivety and pure goodness.
- Wayne Liu as A-Wei (阿緯; Ā Wěi) – The youngest brother. Dancer and energetic. Hip-hop is his favorite. Of all the brothers, he is the most nonexistent one.
  Because he and Hsiao Chieh (小傑) have a crush on their housekeeper, Ya Tou, they would constantly fight for her heart. He usually pays more attention to Ya Tou even when he is among beautiful girls and is usually more helpful to her than the other brothers. After Hsiao Chieh (小傑) began a relationship with Hsiao Chieh (筱婕), he seizes his chance to confess to Ya Tou.

==== The Sisters ====
The Sisters is played by 9 members of the girl Hey Girl, (Tuan Lin) and (Candice Liu).

- Julie Tsai as Tong Tong (彤彤; Tóng Tóng) – The former class president of Class 206. She lost her position to Ao Quan due to a misunderstanding that led to a scandal before it was cleared up. She always acts tough in front of boys and acts as the girls' leader. Her best friend in the sisterhood is Mei Mei.
  She once dated a cool schoolmate named Hsiao Ma, but their relationship ended after she found out he was using her for his tricks against the brothers.
- Tina Chou as Da Ya (大牙; Dà Yá) – The voice of reason. Strong, tough and righteous. She tends to think logical and fair for everybody else.
  After spending time with Ao Quan, they fall in love. She is the first (after Gui Gui) to find out about the brothers' relationship and contract agreements after she overhears Ao Quan and William talking about it. She was furious to find out the truth the hard way and broke up with Ao Quan. However, they reconcile after a while.
- Emma Wu as Gui Gui (鬼鬼; Guǐ Guǐ) – The most mischievous girl in the class. She can do tricks most people usually cannot. Of all the girls in class, she is the only one who knows of Ya Tou's secret identity and her relation to the brothers.
  She has been in love with Wang Chi since their first encounter. She was mistaken to have cancer when the health care center accidentally switched her results with another man. It was through this experience that Wang Chi confesses his feelings to her and they become a couple.
- Yako Chan as Ya Tou (丫頭; Yā Tóu) – The brothers' housekeeper. Kind and hardworking but clumsy. No one other than Gui Gui knows of her identity. The brothers' father took her in when she lost touch with her mother as a kid. Whenever things get messy, she uses her voice to get the brothers in order.
  She is the subject of A-Wei and Hsiao Chieh (小傑)'s crush. A-Wei confessed to her in the final episode, and though she did not respond, her expression was clear that she had thoughts about accepting him.
- Alexis Kuo as MeiMei – Tong Tong's best friend. Shy, but selfless and energetic.
  She has a crush on musician Hsiao Yu, but because he likes Hsiao Hsun, she is torn between happiness and sorrow. In the end, she decides to let him go and help them get together, and is finally able to move on. Aside from being her friend, she is also his supportive manager.
- Albee Huang as Hsiao Hsun (小薰; Xiǎo Xūn) – The smartest girl in the class. Her personality resembles much of Wang Chi's, and because of that, they often spend time together.
  Hsiao Yu, like many boys in school, has a major crush on her, which prevents him from falling for MeiMei. Though she did not like Hsiao Yu at first, she begins to have a change of heart after he "saved" her from a bunch of mobsters. After that, she and Hsiao Yu are selected to participate in a contest, which later turns out to be from the year before. During the time they practiced, Hsiao Hsun's feelings for Hsiao Yu change gradually and they become a couple.
- Mini Chang as Hsiao Chieh (筱婕; Xiǎo Jié) – A real klutz and bad at everything she does. She was once selected for a roller skating competition, but because she couldn't harness even the easiest tricks, she has the fourth brother, Hsiao Chieh (小傑), take her place instead.
  Ever since then, she has had a crush on him, which she reveals in the final episode and the two of them end up dating. Their names would often cause confusions.
- Victoria Huang as Apple – Rich and fun-loving, she is Da Ya's closest friend. In the final episodes, her family has evoked in a financial crisis, and she is forced to work to pay for her father's debt. When Da Ya finds out about this, she decides to help her out.
- Chanel Wang as Hsiao Man (小蠻; Xiǎo Mán) – The resident fortune-teller in their class. She brings her Tarot cards wherever she goes, and her prediction is always correct.
- Tuan Lin as Ko En (可恩; Kě Ēn) – A girl student in their class. Of all the sisters, she has the fewest lines and the least screen time.
- Candice Liu as Jung Chia (容嘉; Róng Jīa) – Jung Chia is MeiMei's cousin and a part-time worker at an auto shop. She had a crush on Wang Chi, who turned her down after he found out. She was aware of Wei Lian's crush on her, but because she lacks romantic feelings to him, she turned him down. Later, his naive yet kind personality got to her heart and she decided to accept him.

==== The Other Boys ====
- Shawn Chien as Hsiao Ma (小馬; Xiǎo Mǎ) – The new boy transferred to the brothers' school. Tough, athletic and aggressive. He was sent by his father to make the brothers unwittingly break their contract so that they could take their money. His devilish plots are partly based on his jealousy of the brothers' relationship. After everyone found out about his intention, he returns to America against his father's wishes.
  Hsiao Ma started a relationship with former class monitress, Tong Tong, soon after he came to their school. However, their relationship ends after she found out that he used her to break the brothers' contract.
- Peter Lee as Lee Chuan (李銓; Lǐ Quán) – The new boy transferred to the brothers' school. Kindhearted and secretive. Everybody in class likes him. Since he always walks away when he is on the phone, Wang Chi and some of the other brothers have suspected that he might not be as good as he looks. The brothers' suspicion is proven wrong when he transferred to South Africa.
- Hsu-Wei Peng as Hsu Feng (旭風) – A boy student in their class.
- Anthony An as An Tong Ni (安東尼) – A boy student in their class.
- Chun-Han Lee as Chun Han (俊翰) – A boy student in their class.
- Cheng-Hao Yen as Yen Shuai (顏帥) – A boy student in their class.

=== Others ===
- Kuo Tzu-chien (郭子乾) as the boys' father – He was an adventurous, highly accomplished, wealthy man, who had traveled all over the world and met different women. This was how he had the boys and never told one another about their brotherhood. When he got sick, he gathered all his sons and told them they could inherit his money if they would fulfill the conditions of his contract.
- Lee Hsing-wen as father's lawyer – The main antagonist.
- Andy Chang (張世明) as Andy – The boys' father's assistant who came to their school in times of need.
- Na Tou (納豆) as Homeroom teacher, Na Tou – Pathetic and funny, he serves as a comic relief character. Cares for his students, but is wholly unqualified and lacks the knowledge and discipline needed of a good teacher.
- Miao Ke-li as Principal
- Hsiao Hsiang (小香) as Gym teacher
- Mei-Chao Lin (林美照) as Ya Tou Mama – Ya Tou's mother. She handed Ya Tou in the brothers' care in order to protect her. She remained missing in most of Ya Tou's life until they reunited on her 17th birthday.

=== Guest appearances ===
- Akemi Barbara Katsuki as father's assistant, Akemi – She was the one who gathered the boys to the same place and let the lawyer introduce them to each other.
- Kenji Wu (吳克羣) as himself – He makes an appearance during Hsiao Yu's competition to encourage him to pursue his dream to become a musician when he suddenly wanted to give up due to his stress.
- Janet Lee (李蒨蓉) as English teacher, Miranda – She was sent by the brothers' enemy to make them fail English test and take their father's money into his hands. She did not sign up freely, rather she was forced to do so in order to help her catatonic mother. She resigns from her job after she got help from the brothers' father. She ends up dating homeroom teacher, Na Tou.
- Yuli Lin as Tian Tian (甜甜) – Father's personal nurse, who was also a former model. She was sent to the brothers to take care of the amnesiac Hsiao Chieh while helping Ya Tou do with housework. Her beautiful looks and perfect domestic skills often drag attention from the brothers, which disheartens Ya Tou. Tian Tian herself is also aware of this, and feels bad for her. She resigns from her job after their father ordered her to return, but not before encouraging Ya Tou to keep being the brothers' housekeeper.
- Monkey as Postman
- Hakka-Pac (各派克) as Bystander #2

== Soundtrack ==
Brown Sugar Macchiato

Soundtrack album by Lollipop F and Hey Girl
- Released: August 31, 2007
- Genre: Mandopop
- Language: Mandarin
- Label: EMI Music Taiwan

Brown Sugar Macchiato Original TV Drama Soundtrack (CD+DVD) (黑糖瑪奇朵 偶像劇原聲帶) was released on August 31, 2007, by Lollipop F and Hey Girl under EMI Music Taiwan. It contains fifteen songs, in which ten songs are various instrumental versions of the five original songs. The album also includes a DVD. The opening theme song is "Brown Sugar PK Show" by Lollipop F and Hey Girl, while the ending theme song is by Lollipop F entitled "Love Macchiato".

=== Track listing ===
No.	Title	Singer(s)	Length
1.	"Brown Sugar Variation" (黑糖變奏 Intro inst.)
2.	"Brown Sugar PK Show" (黑糖秀)	Lollipop F and Hey Girl
3.	"Bitter Sweet Guitar" (苦茶七分甜 inst.)
4.	"Concerto of Macchiato" (微酸協奏曲 inst.)
5.	"Love Macchiato" (愛情瑪奇朵)	Lollipop F
6.	"Crystal Macchiato" (水晶瑪琪朵 inst.)
7.	"Charm of Brown Sugar" (黑糖放電 inst.)
8.	"Hello Breeze of Love" (Hello愛情風)	Hey Girl
9.	"Crystal Tea" (晶凍苦茶 inst.)
10.	"Rockin' Love" (搖滾吧！愛情 inst.)
11.	"Crazy Love Bozo" (暴走豬頭 inst.)
12.	"Love Bozo" (大豬頭)	Lollipop F
13.	"Comic Bozo" (甘草豬頭 inst.)
14.	"Macchiato Sonata" (瑪琪朵奏嗚曲 inst.)
15.	"Bitter Sweet" (苦茶)	Lollipop F and Hey Girl

DVD
No.	Title	Length
1.	"Brown Sugar drama highlights"
2.	"A day in the life of Brown Sugar Macchiato"
3.	"Brown Sugar Macchiato Interview"
4.	"Brown Sugar Macchiato - Lollipop adventure"
5.	"Brown Sugar PK Show music video" (黑糖秀 MV)
6.	"Love Macchiato music video" (愛情瑪奇朵 MV)
7.	"Love Bozo music video" (大豬頭 MV)

== Production credits ==
- Producer: Lian Shu Hsian / An Ching Hung
- Director: Ming-Tai Wang (王明台) / Chen I Hsian / Lian Shu Hsian
- Screenwriter: Su Da I / Wu Wei Chun / Chang Wan Ni
