= Mini Chang =

Taiwanese singer and actress

Ning Ni
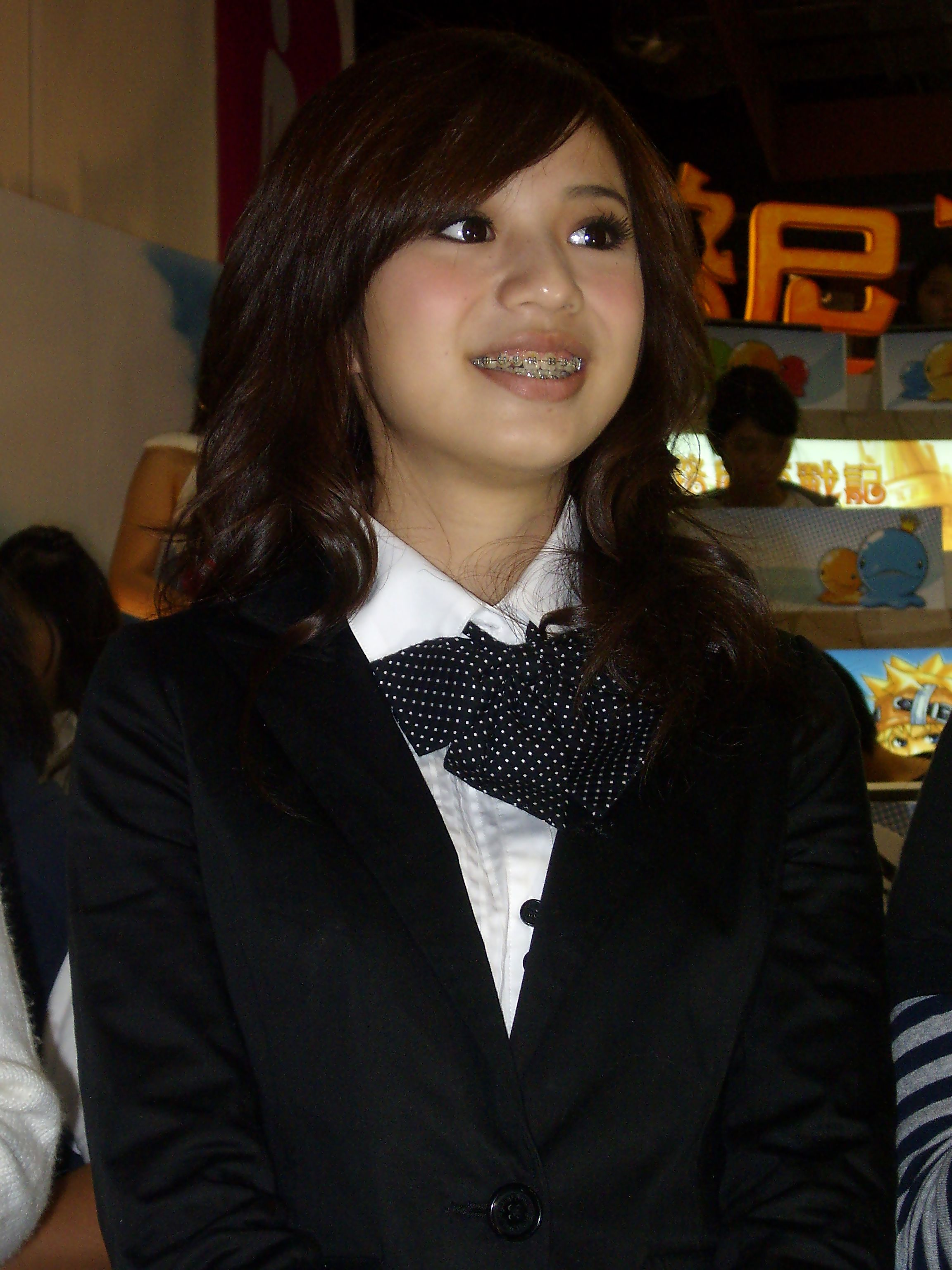
- Mini Chang
- Born: Mini Chang Hsiao Chieh; 25 July 1991 (age 35); Taiwan
- Occupations: singer, actor
- Years active: 2005–present

Chinese name
- Traditional Chinese: 張筱婕/張甯兒
- Simplified Chinese: 张筱婕/张宁儿
Transcriptions
Standard Mandarin
- Hanyu Pinyin: Chang Hsiao Chieh /Chang Ning Er
- Musical career
- Origin: Taiwan
- Genres: Mandarin pop
- Labels: Channel [V] (2006–2010.01.10); Linfair Records (2006–2007.06); Warner Music Taiwan (2008.05-2009); A Legend Star Entertainment (2010.01.10-present)
- Formerly of: Hey Girl
- Website: http://weibo.com/jie725 張甯兒Jie

Mini Chang (Chinese: 張甯兒; pinyin: Zhang Ning Er) is a singer and actress. She is in the Taiwanese girl band Hey Girl. To participate in the program because Blackie's Teenage Club (我愛黑澀會) outstanding performance. She was selected as the official debut of the first nine Hey Girl (formerly known as Blackie Beauties) a member of the youngest member of an also is the only team to crush braces.

On 17 March 2010, Ning Ni decided to leave Hey Girl as they are now signed to Andy Chang new agency company, named A Legend Star Ltd..

== Filmography ==
=== Presenter ===
Channel V

- 我愛黑澀會 Blackie's Teenage Club
- 我愛黑澀棒棒堂 Blackie Lollipop
- 模范棒棒堂 Mo Fan Lollipop
- 音樂飆榜 Top 20
- 美眉普普風 Pop Beauty Wind

TVBS-G

- 美眉ㄅ ㄠ ˋㄅ ㄠ ˋ

Lain

- 黑潮部落
- 2007台北最HIGH新年城跨年晚會

Drama

- 2006 – A Dangerous Mind (危險心靈) (episode 3) as Chang Hsiao Chieh (張筱婕)
- 2007 – Brown Sugar Macchiato (黑糖瑪奇朵) as Hsiao Chieh (筱婕)(as herself)
- 2008 – The Legend of Brown Sugar Chivalries (黑糖群俠傳) as Guardian Hsieh Nǚ (邪女護法)

== Discography ==
- 美眉私密日記：我愛黑澀會美眉 Beauties' Private Diary:I Love Blackie Beauties (released 14 July 2006, published by Linfair Records)
- 美眉私密的一天-甜心轟炸機 Beauties' Private Day-Honey (released 15 December 2006, published by Linfair Records)
- 美眉私密 Party：幸福的泡泡 Beauties' Private Party:Happiness Bubble (released 7 June 2007, published by Linfair Records)
- 黑糖瑪奇朵偶像劇原聲帶 Brown Sugar Macchiato OST (CD + DVD) (released 31 August 2007, issued by Capitol Records and EMI Taiwan)
- 黑Girl首張同名專輯 (released 29 August 2008, published by Warner Music)

== Book ==
- 美眉私密寫真集Party (released 7 June 2007)
- 黑糖瑪奇朵歡樂 Party
- 黑糖瑪奇朵電視小說
- Hey Girl Friend (released 22 July 2009)
