= The Legend of Brown Sugar Chivalries =

2008 Taiwanese television drama series

- 黑糖群俠傳
- Genre: Wuxia, School, Comedy, Drama, Romance, Teen Drama.
- Starring: Wang Chi; Hsiao Hsun; A-Wei; Ya Tou; Hsiao Man; MeiMei; A-Ben; Hsiao Yu; Hsiao Ma; Yeun Fei; Hsiao Chieh
- Opening theme: The Sutra Chamber (藏經閣) by Lollipop
- Ending theme: Sorry (對不起) by Wang Chi (1-6); Secret Base (秘密基地) by Lollipop (7-13)
- Country of origin: Republic of China (Taiwan)
- Original language: Mandarin
- No. of episodes: 13

Production
- Production location: Taipei
- Running time: approx. 70 minutes

Original release
- Network: Star TV
- Release: July 26 – October 18, 2008

Related
- Brown Sugar Macchiato (黑糖瑪奇朵); Brown Sugar Come

The Legend of Brown Sugar Chivalries, alias Kungfu Macchiato, (Chinese: 黑糖群俠傳; pinyin: Hēi Táng Qùn Xia Zhuan) is a Taiwanese television drama series, broadcast by Star TV in 2008. This show features most members from the Taiwanese music bands, Lollipop, Hey Girl, Choc7, and guest stars actresses Amanda Chou, Carmen Tang, Michelle Zhang, and FanFan.

The characters are mostly based on the stories of Jin Yong (金庸) and Gu Long (古龍).

== Media ==
It is related to the Chinese TV series Swordsman.

== Synopsis ==
This story incorporates the themes of modern wuxia (Chinese martial arts).

In the world of martial arts, there have been legends of many powerful warriors. The strongest to ever walk the Earth are West Side Principal, Chou Da Tong, Tian Shan Tong Lao, and the villain Dongfang Bu Bai, who engaged in a sex change in order to enhance his martial arts skills.

Right now, the four martial arts schools and the world are facing the danger posed by Dongfang Bu Bai. The principal of West Side School gathers the best students from all four schools in hopes to train them into powerful warriors so they can fight against the enemy and restore peace to the world.

On one occasion, their best student, Ling Huchong, encounters the enemy and loses all of his martial skills during the attack. Furthermore, his girlfriend has a change of heart after spending time with the kind-hearted student, Guo Jing. Ling Huchong's cuckolding becomes a distraction and prevents everyone on the team to focus.

== Cast ==
=== Main cast ===
Main cast is played at Episode 01- 13

- Wang Zi (from Lollipop) as Ling Huchong (令狐聰)
- Xiao Xun (from Hey Girl) as Ren Yingying (任瑩瑩)
- A-Wei (from Lollipop) as Guo Jing (郭敬)
- Ya Tou (from Hey Girl) as Lu Jienning (陸見寧)
- Xiao Man (from Hey Girl) as Xiao Long Nǚ (小聾女)
- MeiMei(from Hey Girl) as Guardian Saintess (聖女護法)
- Ah Ben (from Choc7) as Wei Xiaobao (韋曉寶)
- Xiao Yu (from Lollipop) as Chu Liuxiang (楚琉香)
- Xao Ma (from Choc7) as I He Cang Tai(伊賀蒼太)
- Yeun Fei (from Hey Girl, also from Blackie Beauties) as Shuang Er (霜兒)
- Carmen Tang as Lan Feng Huang (藍鳳煌)
- Michelle Chang as Little Nurse (小護士)
- Hsu Hsiao Shun as Chou Da Tong (周大通)
- Vicky Chen as Jin Xiang Yu(金鑲玉)
- Johnathan Chang as Lu Dayou (陸大有) [Jienning's Father]

==== Supporting cast ====
Support cast is played at 1 - 3 Episode and sometimes appeared in each episodes (1 - 13)

=== Guest appearances ===
- Hsiao Chieh (from Hey Girl) as Guardian Xie Nǚ (邪女護法)
- Ao Quan(from Lollipop) as Hong Shi Ba (洪十八)
- Amanda Chou as Tianshan Tong Lao (天山童荖)
- Fan Fan (Before see her, voice is B2) as Dongfang Bu Bai (東方不拜)

=== Additional Cast ===
- Eric Ma as Ren Hantian (任撼天) [Ren Yingying's Father]
- Tan Hsiao Lan 譚筱嵐 as Ren Yingying's mother (任母)
- Hsiao Chieh (from Lollipop) as Ronaldo [羅納度] (ep.13)
- Wei Lian (from Lollipop) as Beckham [貝克漢] (ep.13)
- Da Ya (from Hey Girl) as Guardian of Cult [邪教護法] (ep.13)
- Gui Gui (from Hey Girl) as Guardian of Cult [邪教護法] (ep.13)
- Apple (from Hey Girl) as Guardian of Cult [邪教護法] (ep.13)

== Soundtrack ==
The Legend of Brown Sugar Chivalries

Soundtrack album by Lollipop and Hey Girl
- Released: October 6, 2008
- Genre: Mandopop
- Language: Mandarin
- Label: EMI Music

The Legend of Brown Sugar Chivalries OST (黑糖群俠傳電視原聲帶) was released on October 6, 2008, by Lollipop and Hey Girl under EMI Music. It contains sixteen songs, in which twelve songs are various instrumental versions of the four original songs. The album also includes a DVD. The opening theme song is "The Sutra Chamber" by Lollipop, while the ending theme song is by Wang Chi entitled "Sorry".

=== Track listing ===
No.	Title	Singer(s)	Length
1.	"The Sutra Chamber" (藏經閣 Cang Jin Ge)	Lollipop
2.	"Sorry" (對不起 Duibuqi)	Wang Chi
3.	"Secret Base" (秘密基地 Mimi Jidi)	Lollipop
4.	"Dear Baby"	Lollipop (Hsiao Yu+A-Wei+Wang Chi) and Hey Girl (Ya Tou+Hsiao Hsun+Hsiao Man)
5.	"As Long As You Remember" (只要你還記得)	Hsiao Yu
6.	"Go In The Sutra Chamber" (衝進藏經閣)	inst.
7.	"Autumn From The Sutra Chamber" (藏經閣之秋)	inst.
8.	"It's Very Sorry" (真的很抱歉)	inst.
9.	"Sorry Amusement Park" (Sorry遊樂園)	inst.
10.	"I Am Not Deliberately" (我不是故意的)	inst.
11.	"Our Base"	inst.
12.	"Go On Next Place" (前往下一站)	inst.
13.	"Dear Honey Baby"	inst.
14.	"Pizzicato Baby"	inst.
15.	"Remember The Journey Of That Year?" (記得那年的旅行嗎？)	inst.
16.	"I Won't Forget" (我不會忘記)	inst.

== Production credits ==
- Producer: Ko I Chin
- Director: Yu Hua Kuen / Ko Han Chen
- Screenwriter: Fang I Te / Tsao Ching Ya
