= Yako Chan =

Taiwanese singer and actress

- 詹子晴
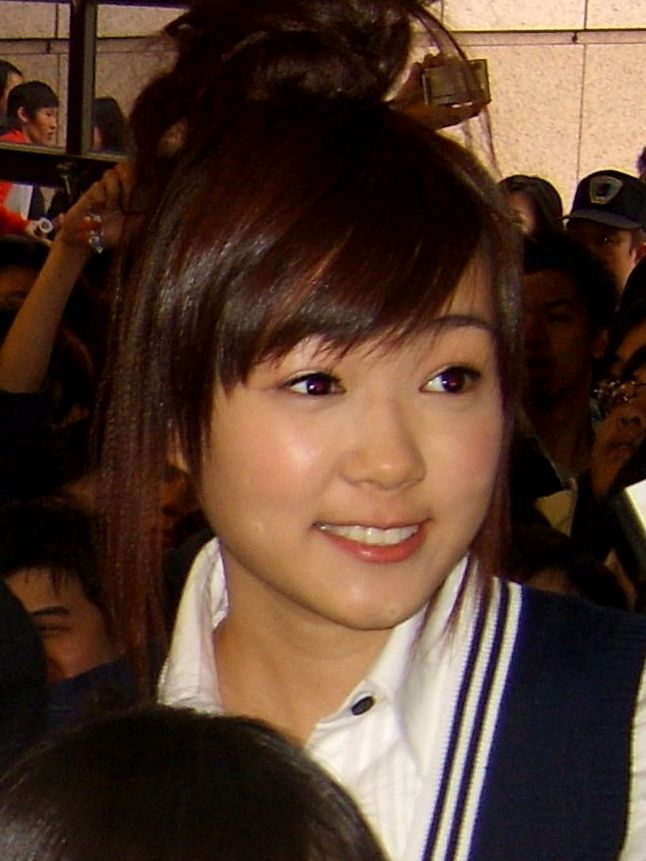
- Chan in 2007
- Born: 11 April 1988 (age 37); Taipei, Taiwan
- Occupations: singer, actor, commercial model
- Years active: 2005–present
- Spouse: William Wang (m. 2020)

Chinese name
- Traditional Chinese: 詹子晴
- Simplified Chinese: 詹子晴
Transcriptions
- Musical career
- Also known as: Yatou 丫頭; Zhan Yawen 詹雅文
- Origin: Taiwan
- Genres: Mandarin pop
- Labels: Linfair Records 2006–2007.6; Warner Music Taiwan 2008.5

Yako Chan (Chinese: 詹子晴; pinyin: Zhan Ziqing) is a Taiwanese singer and actress. She was a member of the band Hey Girl.

== Early life ==
Chan's parents divorced when she was young. Alongside her mother and brother, Chan reportedly lived in impoverished conditions, frequently moving between squalid houses, until she entered the entertainment business. In 2016, Chan bought her first apartment, stating that she hoped her mother and brother would now not have to move again.

== Career ==
Chan made her debut on the variety show Blackie's Teenager Club in 2005.

== Filmography ==
=== Presenter ===
Channel V

- Blackie Lollipop (Wo ai heise bangbang tang 我愛黑澀棒棒堂)
- Blackie's Teenager Club (Wo ai heise hui 我愛黑澀會)
- Pop Beauty Wind (Mei mei pupu feng 美眉普普風)
- Music Charts (Yinyue biaobang 音樂飆榜)
- Popular (Liuxing 流行)
- Model Lollipop (Mofan bangbang tang 模范棒棒堂)

Xing Kong

- Xing Kong 8-Claw Entertainment: Kuroshio Tribe (Xingkong 8 zhua yu – heihu buluo 星空8爪娛－黑潮部落)

=== Television ===
Year	Title	Role
2006	Live Left, Live Right (Zhu zuobian, zhu youbian 住左邊住右邊)	Xiao Zhu
2007	Brown Sugar Macchiato (Heitang maqiduo 黑糖瑪奇朵)	Yatou (herself)
2008	The Legend of Brown Sugar Chivalries (Heitangqun xiazhuan 黑糖群俠傳)	Lu Jianning
2009	Liao Asks More on the V Situation (Liao wen zhiyue V fengyun 廖問之越V風雲)	Xiaolu's wife
2016	Tear People to Order (Si ren dingzhi 撕人訂製）	Yatou (herself)
