= Xiao Man =

Taiwanese singer and actress

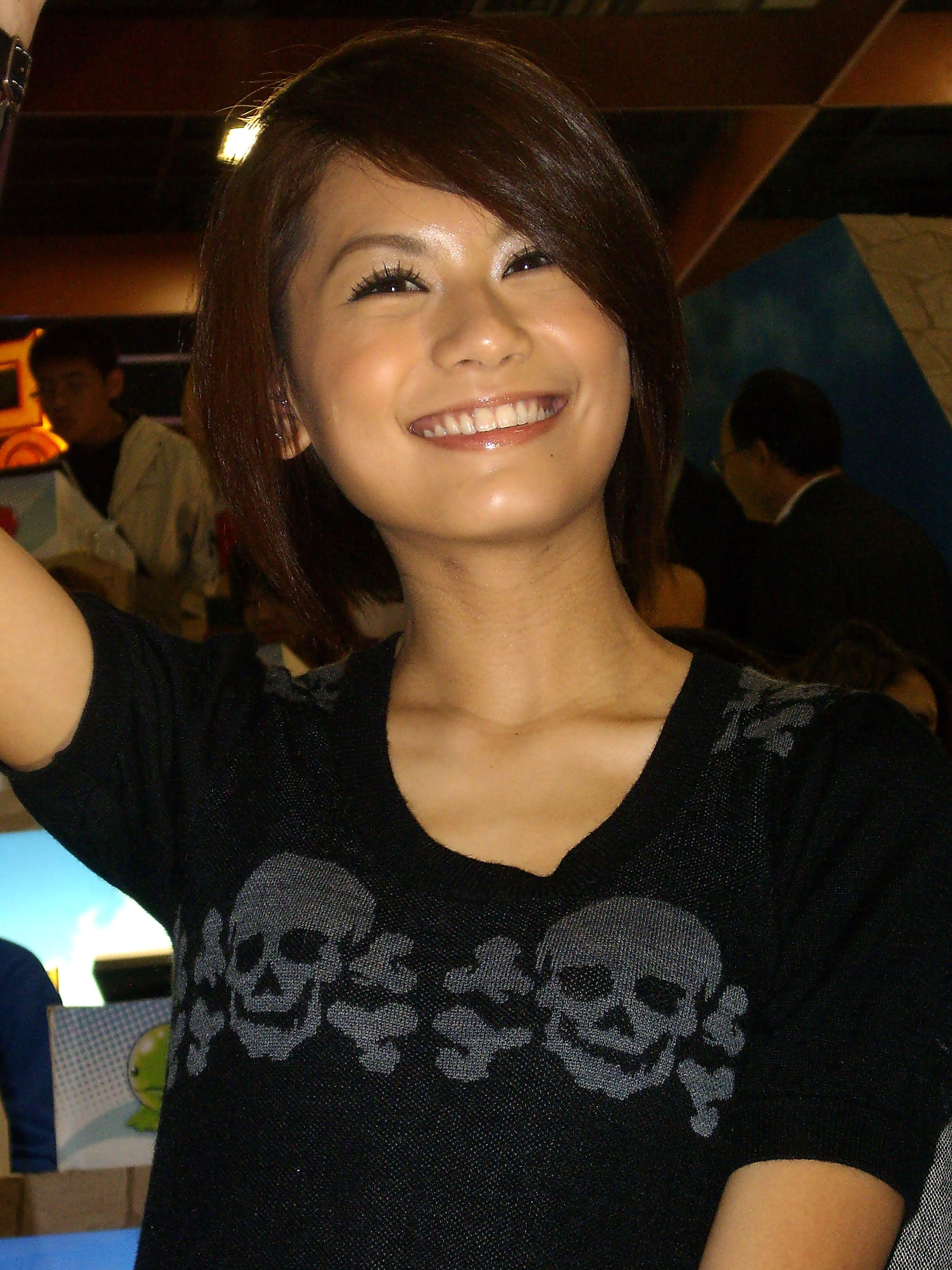
- Born: Wang Cheng-yen (王承嫣); 7 November 1989 (age 36); Taipei, Taiwan
- Occupations: singer, actress, model, host
- Years active: 2002–present
Xiao Man
- Musical career
- Also known as: Lilu Wang
- Origin: Republic of China (Taiwan)
- Genres: Mandarin pop
- Labels: Linfair Records; Warner Music Taiwan

Lilu Wang (Chinese: 王承嫣; pinyin: Wáng Chéngyān), stage name Hsiao Man (Chinese: 小蠻; pinyin: Xiǎo Mán), is a Taiwanese singer and actress. She was formerly in the girl band Hey Girl and currently works as a model in Eelin Modelling Agency.

== Biography ==
Suan Wang was in a group originally known as Hei Se Hui Mei Mei which underwent a name change to Hey Girl. Hey Girl consisted of seven other girls, and they are known to work with another popular Taiwanese boy band, Lollipop, which consists of six boys.

On 17 March 2010, Hsiao Man announced that she left Hey Girl to pursue her career as a model in Eelin Modelling Agency.

In 2010, Hsiao Man, along with the five other top models who turned 21 years old, established Cute Girl and released their first album, Cute Fantasy.

== Drama ==
Year	Channel	Title	Role
2007	FTV (民視); Star Taiwan (衛視中文台)	《Brown Sugar Macchiato》(黑糖瑪奇朵)	Hsiao Man(as herself)
2007	Woo.com (Online Show)	《Here Comes Brown Sugar》(黑糖來了)	Hsiao Man
2008	Star Taiwan (衛視中文台)	《The Legend of Brown Sugar Chivalries》(黑糖群俠傳)	Wave Amplifier(小聾女)
2010	PTS (公视)	《Death Girl》(死神少女)	Pei Pei (佩佩)
2012		Happy Michelin Kitchen (幸福三顆星)	
2012		《Gung Hay Fat Choy》(我們發財了)	

== TV Show Theme Songs ==
- Lollipop & Hey Girl – Ku Cha, Brown Sugar Macchiato (2007)
- Hey Girl – Hello Ai Qing Feng, Brown Sugar Macchiato (2007)
- Lollipop & Hey Girl – Hei Tang Xiu, Brown Sugar Macchiato (2007)
