= Hey Girl (group) =

Taiwanese girl group

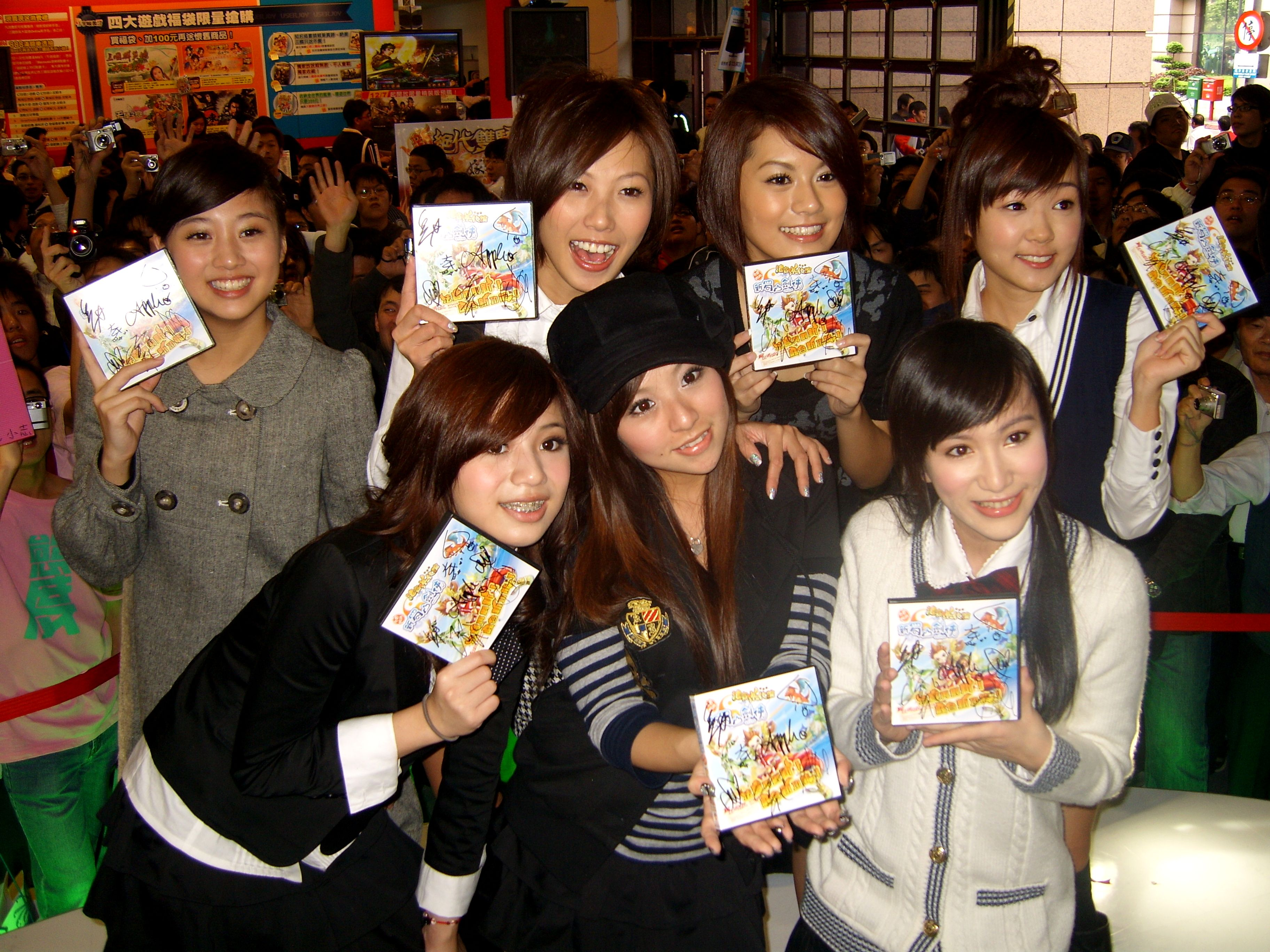
- 2007 Taipei IT Month: Members from Hey Girl at booth of Chinese Gamer International Corp.
- Born: Taiwan
- Occupations: singers; actors; commercial models
- Years active: 2006 May – 2013 Nov (7 years 6 months).
- Musical career
- Also known as: Hei Se Hui Mei Mei (Mean: Blackie Beauties)
- Origin: Taiwan
- Genres: Mandarin pop
- Labels: Linfair Records 2006–2007.6; Warner Music Taiwan 2008.5- 2009; M'stones 2011–2013.11
- Past members: Bae Tung Tung; Gui Gui; Da Ya; MeiMei; Apple; Ning Er; Hsiao Man; Yeun Fei; Si Ya; Ya Tou; Chi Ting; Hsiao Hsun

Hey Girl was a Taiwanese girl group. Channel [V] held an audition for the show Blackie's Teenage Club (我愛黑澀會), a variety show that aims to create new female entertainers in Taiwan. At the end of 2005, Channel [V] picked nine members to represent the other girls. These nine members were Gui Gui, Ning Er, MeiMei, Apple, Hsiao Hsun, Ya Tou, Hsiao Man, Bae Tung Tung, and Ta Ya. Together, they are affectionately known as the Nine Beauties (Chinese: 九妞妞; pinyin: Jiǔ Niū Niū) for short.

The nine members were separated into two groups for their third EP release: Ta Ya, Hsiao Man, Ya Tou, Gui Gui, and Apple comprised Pink (traditional Chinese: 粉紅高壓電; ; pinyin: Fěn Hóng Gāo Yā Diàn; lit. 'high-voltage pink'), and Mei Mei, Hsiao Hsun, Ning Er, and Bae Tung Tung comprised Honey (traditional Chinese: 甜心轟炸機; ; pinyin: Tián Xīn Hōng Zhà Jī; lit. 'sweet-hearted flying bombers').

== Issues and Scandals ==
=== Departure of Bae Tung Tung ===
On October 5, 2007, Bae Tung Tung left Hey Girl (including the Wo Ai Hei Se Hui show). It is rumoured that she left because of a rift with band leader Ta Ya over an alleged affair with Bae Tung Tung's boyfriend at the time, Hakka-Pac; other sources suggest that Bae Tung Tung was forced to depart due to violations of her contract. Bae Tung Tung reports that she began cutting herself during this stressful period.

Moving forward, Bae Tung Tung has stated that she plans to concentrate on her singing and dancing. She is currently working for Momo Kids, a Taiwanese television company featuring children's programming.

=== Departure of Gui Gui ===
Gui Gui has currently left the management of Channel V, where all the band members originate from. Andy Ge has admitted to the press that she is unlikely to renew her contract, with an ambiguous post on her own blog, Gui Gui had admitted to the news.

While Andy Ge also clarifies, Hey Girl is not under Channel V management so Gui Gui is still with Hey Girl and will be attending promotions per usual.

However, the Hey Girl promotion following his statement did not include Gui Gui who was said to be busy with MIT promotion before and during their promotion. On May 6, 2009, Andy Ge announced to the press that Gui Gui will not be renewing her contract with Channel V, he also states that her involvement with Hey Girl will have to be clarified with Warner Music, as Hey Girl do not belong to Channel V.

=== Departure of Hsiao Man ===
Hsiao Man has currently left the management of Channel V. She has signed to Eelin Model Agency. She has decided to leave Hey Girl to become a model.

=== Departure of Yeun Fei ===
On September 16, 2010, members of Hey Girl performed at an event in Nanchang which did not include Yeun Fei. Instead, it was a new member who was emerged from the event's promotional poster and the Hey Girl members' blogs. Ya Tou later confirmed in her Sina blog that Yeun Fei is no long a member of Hey Girl, but will continue to appear on the "Black Lollipop" show. The newest member, Chi Ting (子庭), has not yet appeared on any of the Channel V related shows and many fans seemed baffled and upset about the departure of Yeun Fei. Further speculations have suggested that the switch maybe due to Yeun Fei's high-profile relationship with one of the Didi "EDD", which the management frowns upon.

=== Departure of Si Ya ===
As of April 2011, Si Ya's personal "weibo" has listed herself as "without a management agent/agency". Subsequently, she did not appear in any of Hey Girl's promotional activities in China. She did, however, appeared in number of variety shows such as 麻辣天后宫 and 鑽石夜總會 as one of the special guests. On May 5, 2011, the Hong Kong promotion company has unveiled the "new" Hey Girl member which included only Ya Tou, Hsiao Hsun, and Chi Ting.

=== Departure of other members ===
Ta Ya, Ning Er, MeiMei & Apple had also decided to leave Hey Girl as they are now signed to Andy Ge's new agency company "A Legend Star Ltd". Ya Tou and Hsiao Hsun are still in Hey Girl, but with two new members, Si Ya and Yeun Fei. Although it has been rumoured that Ya Tou and Hsiao Hsun will also leave after they have fulfilled their contracts to join A Legend Star, which never occurred.

=== Departure of Chi Ting, Ya Tou, Hsiao Hsun ===
They left Hey Girl because their newest single Hey Girl did not sell well. They will not perform together for another 1 year. Ya Tou & Chi Ting have changed their talent agency to Jack Production (Ya Tou at 2013) & Yi Teng Entertainment (Chi Ting at 2014), just Hsiao Hsun stayed at M'stone International. This means that Hey Girl is disbanded. Chi Ting also married Andrew Lin in September 2014.

== Name Change ==
Originally, the group's name, Hei Se Hui Mei Mei, is a pun on the words "Mei Mei" (traditional Chinese: 美眉,1: beautiful girls) and "Hei She Hui" (traditional Chinese: 黑社會; ; lit. 'black society; triad'). Later, after the group's move to Warner Music Taiwan, its name was changed to 黑Girl, and the English name officially became Hey Girl. The change in name resulted from the record company's concerns that scandalous rumors of other members of the show Wo Ai Hei Se Hui would be associated with Hei Se Hui Mei Mei (Hey Girl).

== Members ==
=== Julie Tsai (Bay Tong Tong) ===
- Birth Name: Tsai Ti-Tong (Chinese: 蔡玓彤)
- Birthdate: December 10, 1986 (age 39)
- Stage Name: Bae Tong Tong (Chinese: 貝童彤) & Tong Tong Chieh Chieh (Chinese: 彤彤姐姐)
- Old Stage Name: Tong Tong (Chinese: 彤彤)
- English Name: Julie Tsai
- Languages: Mandarin
- Profession: Actress, Singer, and Host
- Education: National Chung Hsing Senior High School
- Talent agency: Hsingheng Entertainment
- Position: Main Dancer, Lead Vocalist, Rapper

=== Emma Wu (Gui Gui) ===
- Birth Name: Wu Ying-Chieh (Chinese: 吳映潔)
- Birthdate: August 11, 1989 (age 36)
- Stage Name: Gui Gui (Chinese: 鬼鬼)
- English Name: Emma Wu
- Languages: Mandarin, Taiwanese, English
- Profession: Actress, Host and Singer
- Education: Jhuang Jing Vocational School (Performing Arts)
- Talent agency: Emma Wu Studio
- Position: Sub Vocalist, Rapper

=== Tina Chou (Ta Ya) ===
- Name: Chou Yi-Pei (Chinese: 周宜霈)
- Old Name: Chou Yun-Chen (Chinese: 周雲溱)
- Birth Name: Chou Yi-Chun (Chinese: 周怡君)
- Birthdate: October 21, 1984 (age 41)
- Stage Name: Ta Ya (Chinese:大牙)
- English Name: Tina Chou
- Language: Mandarin
- Profession: Actress, Singer, and Host
- Education: Hwa Kang Arts School (Taipei, Taiwan)
- Talent agency: Sentimental Creative Studio
- Position: 1st Leader, Main Vocalist, Visual

=== MeiMei Kuo (MeiMei) ===
- Birth Name: Kuo Chieh-Chi (Chinese: 郭婕祈)
- Birthdate: August 16, 1985 (age 40)
- Stage Name: MeiMei
- English Name: Alexis, Isabelle, MeiMei Kuo
- Languages: Mandarin
- Profession: Actress, Singer, Model and Dancer
- Education: Taipei National University of the Arts and unezsa
- Now in: M4 (disbanded)
- Talent agency: No Limit Entertainment
- Position: Vice Leader, Lead Dancer, Lead Vocalist

=== Apple Huang (Apple) ===
- Birth Name: Huang Wei-Ting (Chinese: 黃暐婷)
- Birthdate: March 28, 1984 (age 42)
- Stage Name: Apple
- English Name : Apple Huang
- Language: Mandarin, Hakka, Cantonese (a little bit), Taiwanese
- Profession: Actress, Singer, and Host
- Education: Hwa Kang Arts School (Taipei, Taiwan)
- Sister or Brother: Yuri Huang (Yao Yao) + Man Huang (A Man)
- Talent agency: A Legend Star Entertainment
- Position: Lead Vocalist, Face of the group

=== Mini Chang (Ning Er) ===
- Name: Chang Ning-Er (Chinese: 張甯兒)
- Birth Name: Chang Hsiao-Chieh (Chinese: 張筱婕)
- Birthdate: July 25, 1991 (age 34)
- Stage name: Ning Er (Chinese: 甯兒)
- Old Stage Name: Hsiao Chieh, Hsiao Chieh (Chinese: 筱婕, 小婕)
- English Name: Mini Chang
- Languages: Mandarin
- Profession: Actress, Singer, Dancer, and Host
- Education: Jhuang Jing Vocational School
- Talent agency: A Legend Star Entertainment
- Position: Sub Vocalist

=== Lilu Wang (Hsiao Man) ===
- Name: Wang Cheng-Yen (Chinese: 王承嫣)
- Old Name:Wang Ching-Chiao (Chinese: 王婧喬)
- Birth Name: Wang Shu-Hsuan (Chinese: 王淑萱)
- Birthdate: November 7, 1989 (age 36)
- Stage Name: Hsiao Man (Chinese:小蠻)
- English Name: Lilu Wang
- Old English Name: Chanel Wang & Shuan Wang & Suan Wang
- Language: Mandarin, Taiwanese, English
- Profession: Actress, Singer, and Model
- Education: National Chung Hsing Senior High School
- Talent agency: Oneness Music Entertainment
- Position: Sub Vocalist

=== Ruby Lin (Yong Tu) ===
- Name: Lin Ting-Yu (Chinese: 林筳諭)
- Old Name: Chen Ting-Yu (Chinese: 陳筳諭)
- Birth Name: Chen Jung-Ying (Chinese: 陳融瑩)
- Birthdate: August 5, 1990 (age 35)
- Stage Name: Yong Tu (Chinese: 勇兔)
- Old Stage Name: Lin Yeun-Fei (Chinese: 林允菲) or Yeun Fei (Chinese: 允菲)
- English Name: Ruby Lin
- Languages: Mandarin, Taiwanese
- Profession: Dancer, Singer, and Host
- Education: Jhuang Jing Vocational School
- Talent agency: Chuan Hsuan Media Studio
- Position: Lead Dancer, Sub Vocalist

=== Candy Chen (Si Ya) ===
- Name: Chen Si-Ya (Chinese: 陳斯亞)
- Birth Name: Cheng Yu-Ting (Chinese: 鄭羽婷)
- Birthdate: January 3, 1993 (age 33)
- Stage Name: Si Ya(Chinese: 斯亞)
- Old Stage Name: Tang Kuo, Yi Ling (Chinese: 糖果, 伊凌)
- English Name: Candy Chen
- Old English Name: Emily Cheng & Nina Chen
- Languages: Mandarin, Taiwanese, English
- Profession: Dancer and Singer
- Education: Nan Chiang Industrial and Commercial Senior High School
- Related group: Twinko (2013–2016)
- Talent agency: Easy C&C
- Position: Main Dancer, Lead Vocalist, Visual

=== Yako Chan (Ya Tou) ===
- Name: Chan Tzu-Ching (Chinese: 詹子晴)
- Birth Name: Chan Ya-Wen (Chinese: 詹雅文)
- Birthdate: April 11, 1988 (age 38)
- Stage Name: Ya Tou (Chinese: 丫頭)
- English Name: Yako Chan
- Languages: Mandarin, English, Korean (a little bit)
- Profession: Actress and Singer
- Education: Hsing Wu College (English Program) Taipei, Taiwan
- Talent agency: Easy C&C
- Position: 2nd Leader, Lead Dancer, Sub Vocalist, Rapper, Face of the group

=== Mia Chang (Tzu Ting) ===
- Name: Chang Tzu-Ting (Chinese: 張子庭)
- Birth Name: Chang Ting-Wei (Chinese: 張庭瑋)
- Birthdate: September 23, 1985 (age 40)
- Stage Name: Tzu Ting (Chinese: 子庭)
- Old Stage Name: Hung Tou, Chang Ai-Ping, Ting Ting (Chinese: 紅豆, 張艾蘋, 庭庭)
- English Name: Mia Chang
- Spouse: Andrew Lin (林聖仁) (2014 Sep – present)
- Languages: Mandarin, Taiwanese, English
- Profession: Dancer, Singer and Model
- Education: Chinese Culture University
- Related group: Red Bean Girls (2005)
- Talent agency: Yi Teng Entertainment
- Position: Main Dancer, Lead Vocalist

=== Esther Huang (Hsiao Hsun) ===
- Birth Name: Huang Ching-Yi (Chinese: 黃瀞怡)
- Birthdate: February 27, 1989 (age 37)
- Stage Name: Hsiao Hsun (Chinese: 小薰)
- English Name: Esther Huang
- Old English Name: Albee Huang
- Languages: Mandarin, Taiwanese, English, Atayal
- Profession: Actress and singer
- Education: Hsin Sheng College of Medical Care and Management
- Talent agency: Fortune Entertainment
- Position: Main Vocalist, Visual

== Filmography ==
=== 2006 ===
- Angel Lover (Chinese: 天使情人; pinyin: Tiān Shǐ Qíng Rén) (2006) – Hsiao Hsun 小薰, Da Ya 大牙
- Taipei Family series (Chinese: 住左邊住右邊; pinyin: Zhù Zuǒ Biān Zhù Yòu Biān; English:Taipei Family) (2006–2007) – Ya Tou 丫頭

=== 2007 ===
- Brown Sugar Macchiato (Chinese: 黑糖瑪奇朵; pinyin: Hei Tang Ma Qi Duo) (2007) – Apple, Da Ya 大牙, MeiMei, Pei Tong Tong 貝童彤, Ya Tou 丫頭, Hsiao Hsun 小薰, Gui Gui 鬼鬼, Hsiao Man 小蠻, Ning Er 甯兒
- Wayward Kenting (Chinese: 我在墾丁*天氣晴; pinyin: Wǒ Zài Kěn Dīng Tiān Qì Qíng) – Da Ya 大牙
- Brown Sugar Come (Chinese: 黑糖來了; pinyin: Hēi Táng Lái Le) (2007) – Da Ya 大牙, MeiMei, Apple, and Hsiao Man 小蠻 (online drama)
- Does It 18+? (Chinese: 18禁不禁; pinyin: 18 Jīn Bù Jīn) (2007) – Hsiao Hsun 小薰

=== 2008 ===
- Rolling Love – (Chinese: 翻滾吧！蛋炒飯; pinyin: Fān Gǔn Ba! Dàn Chǎo Fàn) – Hsiao Hsun 小薰
- The Legend of Brown Sugar Chivalries – (Chinese: 黑糖群俠傳; pinyin: Hēi Táng Qùn Xia Zhuan) – Hsiao Hsun 小薰, Ya Tou 丫頭, Hsiao Man 小蠻,(Main Cast) Mei Mei, Gui Gui 鬼鬼, Da Ya 大牙, Apple, Ning Er 甯兒, Yeun Fei 允菲 (Minor Characters)
- Mysterious Incredible Terminator – (Chinese: 霹靂MIT; pinyin: Pī Lì MIT) – Gui Gui 鬼鬼

=== 2011 ===
- Story 33 – (Chinese: 33故事館; pinyin: 33 Gu Shi Guan]- Ya Tou 丫頭, Hsiao Hsun 小薰, Si Ya 斯亞
- Love You – (Chinese: 醉後決定愛上你; pinyin: Zui Hou Jue Ding Ai Shang Ni]- Hsiao Hsun 小薰
- Rookies' Diary – (Chinese: 新兵日記之特戰英雄; pinyin: Xing Bing Ri Ji Zhi Te Zhan Ying Xiong]- Hsiao Hsun 小薰
- Love Keeps Going – (Chinese: 美樂。加油; pinyin: Mei Le Jia You]- Hsiao Hsun 小薰

=== 2012 ===
- What Is Love (2012 Drama) – (Chinese: 花是愛; pinyin: Hua Shi Ai]- Hsiao Hsun 小薰
- Love Me or Leave Me (2012 Drama) – (Chinese: 我租了一個情人; pinyin: Wo Zu Le Yi Ge Qing Ren]- Hsiao Hsun 小薰

=== 2014 ===
- Fabulous 30 – (Chinese: 女人30情定水舞間; pinyin: Nü Ren 30 Qing Ding Shui Wu Jian]- Hsiao Hsun 小薰

== Short film ==
=== 2012 ===
- Eden Eternal – (Chinese: 聖境傳說; pinyin: Sheng Jing Chuan Shuo]- Hsiao Hsun 小薰, Ya Tou 丫頭, Chi Ting 子庭

== Film ==
=== 2011 ===
- Bu Dai Shuai Wei – (Chinese: 布袋甩尾; pinyin: Bu Dai Shuai Wei]- Ya Tou 丫頭

=== 2012 ===
- Love Is Sin – (Chinese: 白天的星星; pinyin: Bai Tian De Xing Xing]- Hsiao Hsun 小薰
- Double Trouble – (Chinese: 寶島雙雄; pinyin: Bao Dao Shuang Xiong]- Hsiao Hsun 小薰, Ya Tou 丫頭, Chi Ting 子庭
- Legend of the T-Dog – (Chinese: 命運狗不理; pinyin: Ming Yun Gou Bu Li]- Ya Tou 丫頭

=== 2013 ===
- The Ideal City – (Chinese: 一座城池; pinyin: Yi Zuo Cheng Chi]- Hsiao Hsun 小薰

== Discography ==
=== Digital Singles ===
Year	Artist	Song	Album
2006	Hey Girl	I Love Blackie's Teenage Club	Beauties' Private Diary : I Love Blackie Beauties
2006	Hey Girl	Shake It Baby	Beauties' Private Day- Pink+Honey
2006	Hey Girl	I Want To Love Well	Beauties' Private Day- Pink
2006	Hey Girl	123 Pinocchio	Beauties' Private Day- Pink
2006	Hey Girl	Shining Kiss	Beauties' Private Day-Honey
2006	Hey Girl	Sunny Dolls	Beauties' Private Day- Honey
2007	Hey Girl	Happiness Bubble	Beauties' Private Party : Happiness Bubble
2007	Hey Girl	Hello Breeze Of Love	Brown Sugar Macchiato OST
2008	Hey Girl	Call Big Sister	Hey Girl First Debut Album
2008	Hey Girl	OOXX	Hey Girl First Debut Album
2008	Hey Girl	Female	Hey Girl First Debut Album
2008	Hey Girl	Hakuna Matata	Hey Girl First Debut Album
2008	Hey Girl	Bread With Jam	Hey Girl First Debut Album
2008	Hey Girl	Love Is Dreaming	Hey Girl First Debut Album
2008	Hey Girl	Souvenir	Hey Girl First Debut Album
2008	Hey Girl	Goodbye, The Fool!	Hey Girl First Debut Album
2008	Hey Girl	Who Said	Hey Girl First Debut Album
2008	Hey Girl	Love Elastic Bonding Tapes	Hey Girl First Debut Album
2011	Hey Girl	Hey Girl	Hey Girl
2011	Hey Girl	Lover And Friend	Hey Girl

=== Collaborations ===
Year	Artist	Song	Album
2007	Lollipop & Hey Girl	Bitter Sweet	Brown Sugar Macchiato OST
2007	Lollipop & Hey Girl	Brown Sugar PK Show	Brown Sugar Macchiato OST
2008	Lollipop – Hsiao Yu+A-Wei+Wang Chi & Hey Girl – Ya Tou+Hsiao Hsun+Hsiao Man	Dear Baby	The Legend of the Brown Sugar Chivalries OST

=== Albums ===
- 2008 – Hey Girl First Debut Album (黑Girl首張同名專輯)

=== EP ===
- 2006 – I Love Blackie Beauties (我愛黑澀會美眉)
- 2006 – Beauties' Private Day – Pink/Honey (美眉私密的一天 – 粉紅高壓電 / 甜心轟炸機)
- 2007 – Beauties' Private Party : Happiness Bubble (美眉私密Party:幸福的泡泡)
- 2011 – Hey Girl

=== Soundtrack ===
- 2007 – Brown Sugar Macchiato OST (黑糖瑪奇朵偶像劇原聲帶)
- 2008 – The Legend of the Brown Sugar Chivalries OST (黑糖群俠傳電視原聲帶)

=== DVD ===
- 2006 I Love Blackie Beauties Secret Dairy
- 2007 Blackie Beauties Secret Party

=== Photo-books ===
- 2007 Beauties' Private Party Full Colour Photo-book
