= Kimberley Chen discography =

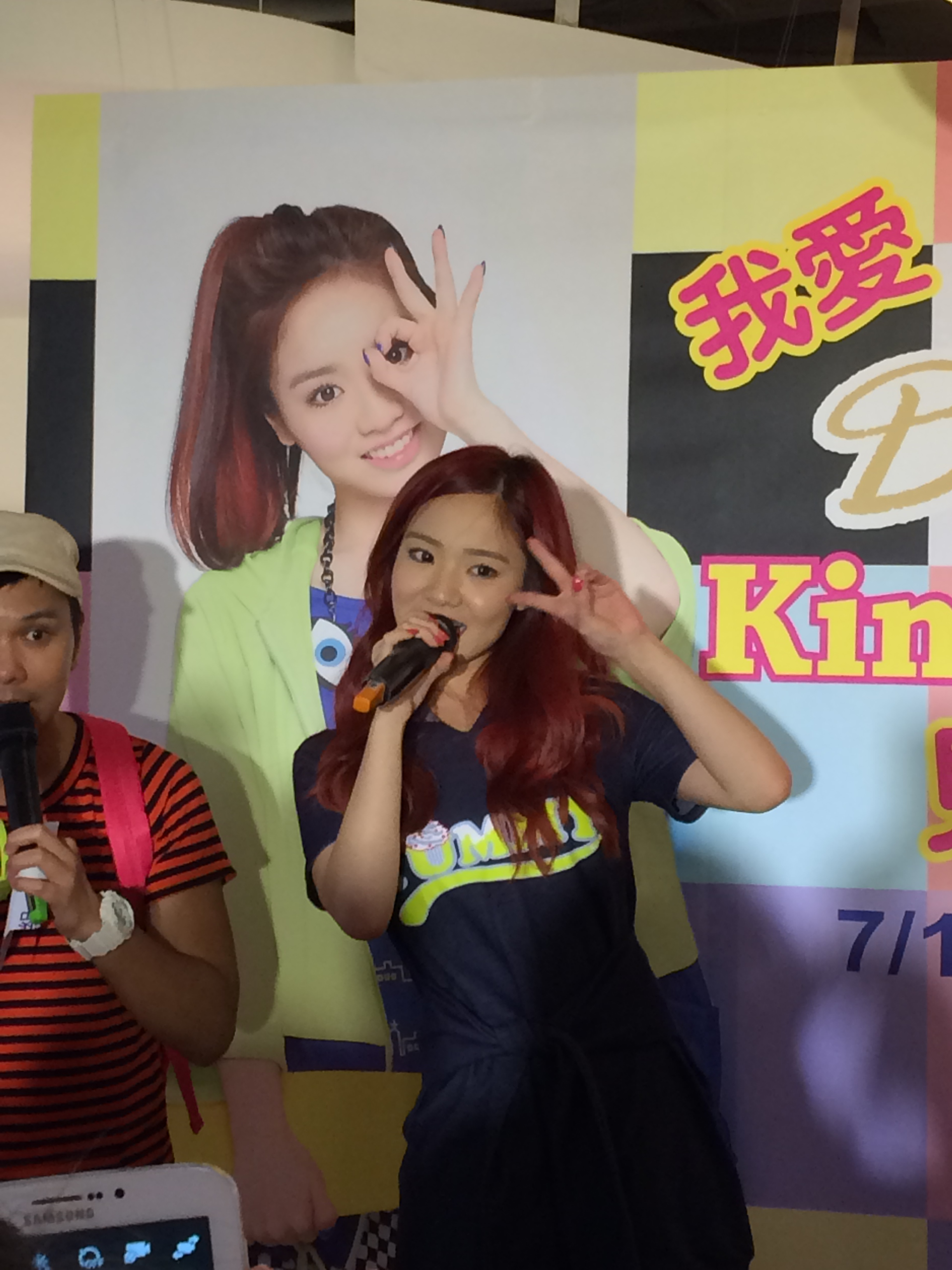
- Kimberley at Dailo in 2014
- Studio albums: 6
- EPs: 1
- Singles: 16
- Music videos: 30

Chen has released six studio albums and sixteen singles. She signed a record deal with Sony Music Taiwan in 2010 and released her self-titled album Kimberley in 2012.

She then released her second studio album, entitled Kimbonomics in 2013. In 2014, she terminated the contract with Sony Music. At the same year, she signed a new contract with B.ANGEL.

In 2015, "You Are My Happiness" and "Do You Know That I Love You?" were released.

In 2017, she released her third studio album with Sharp Music, entitled "#Tag Me".

In 2020, she released her fourth studio album with ChynaHouse, entitled "公主病" (Princess Tendencies). In 2021, she released her fifth studio album "wfh", and her sixth studio album "Up on the Roof" in 2022.

== Studio albums ==
#	English title	Chinese Title	Release date	Label
1st	Kimberley	Kimberley首張同名專輯	27 April 2012	Sony Music Taiwan
2nd	Kimbonomics	金式代	25 December 2013	Sony Music Taiwan
3rd	#Tag Me	#Tag Me	15 December 2017	Sharp Music
4th	Princess Tendencies	公主病	4 December 2020	ChynaHouse Digital Co. Ltd
5th	wfh	-	17 September 2021	ChynaHouse Digital Co. Ltd
6th	Up on the Roof	-	2 September 2022	ChynaHouse Digital Co. Ltd

== Singles ==
List of singles, released date
#	Title	Released date	Label	Ref.
1	原來你就是我的快樂 (You Are My Happiness)	April 1, 2015	B.ANGEL	
2	我愛你你知道嗎 (Do You Know That I Love You?)	May 20, 2015	B.ANGEL	
3	管你的擁抱 (Forget Your Feelings)	August 16, 2016	KKFARM	
4	心動拍拍 (Heartbeat)	August 22, 2018	Sharp Music Taiwan	
5	逆光 (Backlight)	May 22, 2020	ChynaHouse Digital Co. Ltd	
6	9 Million	July 17, 2020	ChynaHouse Digital Co. Ltd	
7	4am Calls	August 14, 2020	ChynaHouse Digital Co. Ltd	
8	話不好說	October 16, 2020	ChynaHouse Digital Co. Ltd	
9	L.O.V.E.S.H.I.T	October 30, 2020	ChynaHouse Digital Co. Ltd	
10	After the Rain	November 13, 2020	ChynaHouse Digital Co. Ltd	
11	Kow Tow	March 12, 2021	ChynaHouse Digital Co. Ltd	
12	in my toes	June 29, 2021	ChynaHouse Digital Co. Ltd	
13	已經 (already)	February 22, 2022	晨嵐 Music Studio	
14	Who Says	June 10, 2022	ChynaHouse Digital Co. Ltd	
15	小缺點	January 6, 2023	ChynaHouse Digital Co. Ltd	
16	street signs	May 30, 2023	ChynaHouse Digital Co. Ltd	

== Other Appearance ==
=== Collaborations ===
Year	Song title	Details
2012	Internet	Album: 365; Featuring Artist(s): JPM
2013	練習愛情 (Let's Work It Out)	Album: 你好 Hi; Featuring Artist(s): Dawen 王大文
2015	Feel Good	Album: 不需要裝乖 No Need To Pretend; Featuring Artist(s): R-Chord 謝和弦
2020	一起飄著 (Floating Together)	Album: 一起飄著; Featuring Artist(s): 呆伯特 Albert
2020	Cry Baby	Album: Cry Baby; Featuring Artist(s): Jinbo
2020	Feels Good	Album: Feels Good; Featuring Artist(s): RPG
2020	Walk with Me	Album: Walk with Me; Featuring Artist(s): 壞特 ?te
2021	Afterglow	Album: Afterglow; Featuring Artist(s): AmPm
2021	沒什麼大不了 (no biggie)	Album: 沒什麼大不了; Featuring Artist(s): EggPlantEgg
2021	玻璃心 (Fragile)	Album: 鬼才做音樂 Ghosician; Featuring Artist(s): Namewee 黃明志
2021	This Summer Was Fucked Up; Oh Kelly; 燒三小; Thank God You Called Me Back	Album: This Summer Was Fucked Up; Featuring Artist(s): DJ SON666, Jinbo, HighBoy, 縉 Jin
2021	(Not) Over You	Album: (Not) Over You; Featuring Artist(s): K.Swo
2022	打開太陽 - 美聲版; 雲煙 (Cloud of Smoke); 愛你 (超深情版)	Album: 歡迎美女來到野獸脫口秀; Featuring Artist(s): Flesh Juicer

=== Soundtrack Contributions ===
Year	Series	Contribution	Note
2012	Fondant Garden	"Ai Ni (Love You)" "So Good"	
2015	Sunshine boy dad blissfully unaware	"You Are My Happiness"	
2018	While You Were Sleeping	"One More Day"	Taiwan ETTV Drama Ending Theme Song for While You Were Sleeping
2019	亲爱的，热爱的 (Go Go Squid)	"我可以不在乎的你"	
2020	好想和你在一起 (Be With You)	"可不可以喜歡你"	Chinese Drama Soundtrack for Be With You
2021	聽不見的距離 (The Immeasurable)	"還是回到這"	Theme Song for The Immeasurable movie

== MV ==
Kimberley Chen's Official YouTube Channel (https://m.youtube.com/user/itsKimberleyChen) was set up in 2012, all of her music videos would be uploaded to the channel.

Song	Director	Released date	Note
愛你	張清峰	23 April 2012	Co-op with JPM 廖允傑合作
Never Change	黃中平	10 May 2012	
星際旅行 ft.戴愛玲	黃中平	4 June 2012	
Good Girl趕快愛 (Acoustic Version)		15 December 2013	
Good Girl趕快愛 ft. 廖允傑	游紹	19 December 2013	
分手說愛你 (Acoustic Version)		24 December 2013	
分手說愛你	張瀞予	25 December 2013	Co-op with 劉以豪
世界毀滅 (Acoustic Version)		4 January 2014	
寂寞咆哮 (Acoustic Version)		12 January 2014	
世界毀滅	游紹	15 January 2014	
I Loved Ü Before It Was Cool		23 February 2014	
你在身邊 (Acoustic Version)		5 April 2014	
我會再想你 (Acoustic Version)		19 July 2014	
Over The Moon (Acoustic Version)	YSFYM	16 August 2014	
我愛你 你知道嗎? (Lyrics Video)		20 May 2015	
我愛你 你知道嗎?		25 May 2015	
管你的擁抱 fyf		26 September 2016	
Tag Me	Zen	17 December 2017	
家在哪裡	Born Li	31 December 2017	ft. Miss Ko
再愛我一天	Shawn Yu	30 January 2018	
謝謝你沒有很愛我		30 March 2018	Released from Sharp Music Taiwan Channel
我不浪漫		19 June 2018	Released from Sharp Music Taiwan Channel
9 Million	陶逸群	16 July 2020	
4AM CALLS	陶逸群	13 August 2020	
郵票 (Good Times)		4 December 2020	
沒什麼大不了(no biggie)	陶逸群	16 September 2021	
always be my always	陶逸群	23 October 2021	
打開太陽 - 美聲版	陳仲宇	8 April 2022	ft. Flesh Juicer
雲煙 (Cloud of Smoke)		21 April 2022	ft. Flesh Juicer
street signs		12 July 2023	Released three music videos combining footage with AI
