= The People of the Dragon =

Song by Namewee
- Language: Chinese
- Released: January 26, 2024
- Length: 3:56
- Songwriter: Namewee
- Producers: Namewee, pooh for you (小熊为你, The Puns of Winnie the Pooh in Chinese)

"The People of the Dragon" ("龍的傳人") is a Lunar New Year song released by Malaysian singer Namewee on January 26, 2024, to celebrate the Year of the Dragon. The song has been interpreted as satirizing China's Little Pinks, "Wolf Warriors," General Secretary of the Chinese Communist Party Xi Jinping, political issues in mainland China, and Greater China nationalism.

The music video was filmed at the Baihe Great Wall in Tainan, Taiwan.

== Content ==
The opening of the video features a spoof of the Public Screening Permit from the "pooh for you State Administration of Press, Publication, Radio, Film and Television," (小熊為你新聞出版廣電總局) mimicking the review system that all film and TV productions in mainland China must undergo. In the video, the character pooh for you (小熊为你, The Puns of Winnie the Pooh in Chinese), who performs with Namewee, wears a yellow dragon robe and a Winnie-the-Pooh mask (References comparing Winnie The Pooh To CCP General Secretary Leader In Internet Memes To The Character), with the face pixelated. In the credits, some crew members’ names are also pixelated. The actor playing "pooh for you" is credited as "Jinping (禁評, it means "no comments")," a homophone for Xi Jinping.

The lyrics reference major political and social events in China from 2023, including topics like Myanmar Telecom Network Fraud, lip-syncing, insulting China, effeminate men, and China's Zero-COVID policy. They also mention terms such as "Little Pink" and "Heart in the motherland, body in London."

The song's introduction states that it is "dedicated to Chinese people from all around the world, including Singapore and Malaysia," a likely allusion to pan-Chinese nationalism.

== Reception and commentary ==
Brendan Kavanagh (Dr K), a British pianist known for his performance at London’s St. Pancras railway station, commented on YouTube that he loved the song and even invited Namewee to shoot a video in the UK.

=== Trivia ===
A user on Chinese social media platform TikTok (Mainland China version) claimed their account was permanently banned after sharing the song, believing it to be a harmless Lunar New Year tune. The user later warned others on Xiaohongshu about the song's anti-China nature. Upon hearing this, Namewee responded on Facebook with an apology to the user, sarcastically reiterating that The People of the Dragon is indeed a "patriotic and pro-party" song.

== Impact ==
On August 24, 2024, Namewee revealed that he had received a threatening phone call from Cambodia in April, demanding the removal of "The People of the Dragon" and "Fragile". After refusing, his business partners in China were reportedly harassed and intimidated, forcing them to cancel collaborations. As a result, 15 upcoming shows in his Big Plane World Tour (大飛機世界巡迴演唱會) had to be canceled. On September 10, Namewee held another press conference to announce the relaunch of his world tour and described how the tour, which began in April 2023 at Taipei Arena (台北小巨蛋), was suppressed by Chinese authorities. On China's National Day later that year, Namewee posted that Fragile had surpassed 73 million views on YouTube and The People of the Dragon was nearing 11 million views, jokingly adding that he was "just sharing," with "no other intention."
