= Censorship of Winnie-the-Pooh in China =

Suppression of fictional character

An internet meme comparing Carrie Lam and Xi Jinping (right half of image) to Piglet and Winnie the Pooh (left half), respectively. Such memes are censored in China.

Beginning in July 2017, the government of the People's Republic of China censored satirical memes comparing Xi Jinping, the general secretary of the Chinese Communist Party (CCP), to the anthropomorphic teddy bear Winnie-the-Pooh, particularly Disney's depiction. The CCP reportedly viewed such comparisons as ridicule and symbolic dissent. However, there is no comprehensive prohibition on content related to the character and other images of the character can be readily found on the Internet in China; books and merchandise remain available, and two Winnie-the-Pooh-themed attractions continue to operate at Hong Kong Disneyland and Shanghai Disneyland.

== Background ==
=== Censorship in China ===
The CCP engages in extensive censorship of topics it considers dissident or politically sensitive. Examples include the violence of the Cultural Revolution, the Falun Gong movement, the 1989 Tiananmen Square protests and massacre, and issues related to the Uyghurs, Tibet, and Taiwan.

There is no comprehensive prohibition on all content related to the character Winnie-the-Pooh. Books and merchandise remain available, and two Winnie-the-Pooh-themed attractions continue to operate at Hong Kong Disneyland and Shanghai Disneyland. Academic Michel Hockx summarizes: "Winnie-the-Pooh is literally all over the Internet in China, as well as in toy stores, theme parks, and so on." Chinese AI models, which are heavily regulated by the Cyberspace Administration of China, have also refused to answer prompts about Winnie-the-Pooh.

=== Comparisons between Xi Jinping and Winnie-the-Pooh ===
Chinese Internet users have compared Xi Jinping, the general secretary of the Chinese Communist Party, to Winnie-the-Pooh to satirize his public persona. The comparison dates to 2013, when Xi met U.S. President Barack Obama. An image of the two leaders walking side by side was immediately compared to Pooh and Tigger. Similar comparisons followed involving other leaders, including Japanese Prime Minister Shinzo Abe, who was likened to Eeyore. Chinese authorities responded negatively to the character after political activists and dissidents used it to express discontent.

As a result, the Chinese government blocked images and mentions of Winnie-the-Pooh on social media, part of a broader effort to prevent internet users from circumventing censorship in China.

The Western media focus on the censorship of Winnie-the-Pooh memes developed following July 17, 2017, articles in The New York Times and BBC. Academic Michel Hockx writes, "The articles in question were careful to point out that there was no blanket ban, explaining that the evidence for censorship revolved around only specific images of Winnie-the-Pooh used to make satirical comments about Xi Jinping on one specific social media site (Weibo)."

The 2018 Disney live-action film Christopher Robin was not shown in China, with it being speculated that it was due to the character of Winnie the Pooh becoming a symbol of political resistance. However, some analysts argued the decision may have been unrelated, citing China's annual quota of 34 foreign films. Similarly, the 2011 theatrical release of Winnie the Pooh also did not screen in China, predating both the controversy and Xi's tenure as general secretary.

=== Disneyland Shanghai ===
In 2018, according to Business Insider, China ordered all Winnie-the-Pooh theme park rides to be banned and replaced with new ones, due to the character's use in censored internet memes. However, rides themed towards the franchise have remained in operation as of 2023.

In May 2021, a Shanghai Disneyland employee dressed up as Winnie-the-Pooh was beaten by a child. Following the incident, the parent's dismissive attitude sparked anger among the public. Chinese mass media referred to the character as "Pooh Pooh Bear" (Chinese: 噗噗熊) in reports on the incident, as the name "Winnie" is censored. However, search results for "Pooh Pooh Bear hurt in Shanghai Disneyland" were censored on Weibo following the incident.

=== Others ===
When Xi visited the Philippines, protesters posted images of Winnie-the-Pooh on social media. Other politicians have been compared to Winnie-the-Pooh characters alongside Xi, including Barack Obama as Tigger, Rodrigo Duterte, and Carrie Lam as Piglet, and Fernando Chui as Eeyore.

Liu Xiaobo and his wife Liu Xia, both critics of the Chinese Communist Party, were photographed holding Pooh mugs as an act of protest.

When the film Christopher Robin was not approved for release in China, Taiwan's Ministry of Foreign Affairs criticized China, contending that it had banned the film due to its association with internet memes. CNN observed that only a limited number of foreign films are approved for release each year and approved films tend to be “blockbuster” style.

During pro-democracy protests in 2019 and 2020, Hong Kongers used costumes and masks of characters such as Winnie-the-Pooh to protest the Chinese government.

In 2019, a Chinese student studying in the United States was reportedly arrested upon returning to China and sentenced to six months in prison for posting an image comparing Xi to the cartoon character.

== Cultural impact ==
In June 2018, HBO's late-night talk show Last Week Tonight with John Oliver was blocked in China after an episode spoke about Xi Jinping and censorship of the media in China, including comparisons between Xi and Pooh.

On October 2, 2019, Pooh was featured in the South Park episode "Band in China" as a prisoner in China because of his resemblance to Xi. In the episode, Pooh is killed by Randy Marsh. South Park was banned in China as a result of the episode.

On October 10, 2019, Omegle added an image of the American flag on its front page bearing the text "Xi Jinping sure looks like Winnie-the-Pooh" over it.

On October 16, 2019, YouTuber PewDiePie uploaded an episode of his Meme Review series, in which he reacted to memes comparing Pooh and Xi. Shortly after, PewDiePie reported his content had been banned in China.

On October 15, 2021, the song "Fragile" by Namewee and Kimberley Chen was released. The song was intended to mock the Chinese government and Chinese censorship, and included a comparison between Xi Jinping and Winnie-the-Pooh. As a result, both artists were banned from Weibo in China.

On October 24, 2021, the NBA player Enes Kanter wore a pair of shoes emblazoned with the words "Free China" and featuring Winnie-the-Pooh. The shoes had been designed in collaboration with the Shanghai-born, Australia-based dissident cartoonist Badiucao. Earlier in the week, Kanter had worn other shoes with the messages "Free Tibet" and "Free Uyghur".

In March 2023, Movie distributor VII Pillars Entertainment announced that Winnie-the-Pooh: Blood and Honey, originally scheduled for release in March, would be cancelled for release in the Hong Kong and Macau regions. This move is speculated to be influenced by the amendment of Hong Kong's film censorship regulations in 2021, which prohibits the public screening of movies deemed "potentially harmful to national security." However, VII Pillars Entertainment did not provide any explanation for the decision.

In April 2023, the Taiwanese Air Force released an image of a Taiwanese pilot. The pilot was wearing a shoulder patch depicting a Formosan black bear punching Winnie-the-Pooh. The badge was designed by Alec Hsu in 2022. After the photo went viral, Hsu ordered more patches following increased demand among civilians and the military alike. "I wanted to boost the morale of our troops through designing this patch," he told the media. The patch is not an official part of the Taiwanese Air Force's uniform, although the military "will maintain an open attitude" to things that raise morale.

In 2024, Malaysian rapper Namewee released "Descendants of the Dragon", a song satirizing the Chinese government and its supporters. The music video features numerous references to Pooh, including a person in an emperor's robe wearing a pixelated Pooh mask.

In August 2026, Liberty Times reported that Bilibili deleted reposts of INMU KING, a Japanese AI-generated song based on the memes that spawned from the Manatsu no Yo no Inmu gay porn videos, from their website, partially due to the video featuring Pooh standing in as Xi in a dance-off scene.

=== Video games ===
In November 2018, the character was initially blurred out of the Chinese version of a trailer for Kingdom Hearts III. However, the same site that the trailer was posted on later uploaded a screenshot of the same trailer unedited.

In February 2019, the Taiwanese video game Devotion was found to contain an Easter egg comparing Xi Jinping to Pooh two days after the game's release. As a result, Devotion was subject to review bombing by Chinese gamers on Steam, and the game went from having "Overwhelmingly Positive" reviews overall to being "Mostly Negative". The game was removed from Steam in China on February 23. In July 2019, the Chinese government revoked the business license of Indievent, the original publisher of the game in China. The government's official statement was that the revocation was due to violations of relevant laws.

As of March 2019, Pooh's Chinese-language name (Chinese: 小熊维尼; lit. 'little bear Winnie') was censored in World of Warcraft, PUBG: Battlegrounds and Arena of Valor.

In June 2021, it was reported that the developers of Cyberpunk 2077 had used the tag "Winnie-the-Pooh" for media and content within the game's source code intended to be censored according to guidelines in China.

In 2022, Diablo Immortal was delayed, with publications speculating that this was due to a since-deleted post from the account, allegedly referencing "Winnie-the-Pooh" after China banned Immortal's Official Weibo account due to "violating related laws and regulations". NetEase delayed the launch from June 23 to July 7 in China.

On January 4, 2025, CBR reported that the Marvel-based video game Marvel Rivals had censored the phrase "Winnie-the-Pooh" in chat and displayed the message "Text contains inappropriate content" if a player attempts to use the phrase. According to CBR, this could have happened because the game's developer, NetEase, is a Chinese company that has a partnership with Marvel.

== See also ==
- Erdoğan–Gollum comparison trials, another case of censorship due to comparisons between a national leader and a fictional character
- Euphemisms for Internet censorship in China
- Streisand effect
- Xi Jinping's cult of personality
