= Li Yi Bar =

Subforum of the Baidu Tieba forum

- Website type: Internet forum
- Available in: Simplified Chinese
- Owner: Baidu
- Website: Li Yi Bar
- Registration: Optional
- Launched: 2004
- Current status: Online
- Content license: All rights reserved

Li Yi Bar (Chinese: 李毅吧; pinyin: lǐ yì bā; lit. 'Li Yi subforum', popular name Di Bar, also DB, D8, etc.) is a subforum of the Baidu Tieba forum. The subforum was originally opened for ridiculing soccer player Li Yi. It is well known for its large number of followers, who often flood other Internet forums or subforums.

== History ==
Li Yi Bar was opened in the year 2004, originally for ridiculing the soccer player Li Yi. He has been nicknamed Imperator Li Yi the Great (Chinese: 李毅大帝; pinyin: lǐ yì dà dì), or "Great Emperor" (Chinese: 大帝; pinyin: dà dì) for short, so the Li Yi Bar is nicknamed "Emperor Bar" (Chinese: 帝吧; pinyin: dì bā), "DB", "D8", etc. It is also nicknamed "the Louvre of Baidu" (Chinese: 百度卢浮宫; pinyin: bǎi dù lú fú gōng). Because this subforum has a large number of followers and its followers often flood forums, the phrase "whenever Di Bar sends its expeditionary force, not even a blade of grass is left alive" (Chinese: 帝吧出征，寸草不生; pinyin: dì bā chū zhēng, cùn cǎo bù shēng) has been used to describe it. By 2021 the forum had become much less active compared to its heyday as part of the broader decline of Baidu Tieba, with most of its core users having migrated over to Weibo.

=== 21 June flood event ===
In the year 2007, the subforum Li Yuchun Bar was in conflict with the subforum Li Yi Bar, which caused the owner of Li Yi Bar to be blocked. Then, the followers of Li Yi Bar organized a message flood on Li Yuchun Bar. At about 18:20 on 21 June 2007, Li Yi Bar started flooding, and the owner of Li Yuchun Bar deleted the spam messages continuously. At about 20:20, the flood was as fast as 30 posts per second, so the deletion was not fast enough to remove the spam messages.

=== 29 July flood event ===
From 28 July 2013 to 29 July 2013, there was a large flood on Baidu Tieba. On 28 July 2013, a Tencent Weibo user named Pan Mengying insulted some famous soccer players such as Cristiano Ronaldo and Lionel Messi, which angered many Chinese fans of Real Madrid CF and FC Barcelona. These angry fans decided to flood the over 20 subforums of the Baidu Tieba forum at 8:00 PM. As a larger and larger number of internet users joined in this flood event, this inflamed anger at Chinese fans of Korean stars, and resulted in the participation of the followers of Li Yi Bar and WOW Bar. On the evening of 28 July 2013, the flood reached its climax. Billions of spam messages were posted in dozens of subforums of Baidu Tieba.

=== 2016 Chinese meme war on Facebook ===
In January 2016, a Sina Weibo user organized a flood team from Li Yi Bar, whose mission was to flood Taiwanese president Tsai Ing-wen's Facebook pages under the theme of opposing Taiwan independence. At 19:00 on 20 January 2016, the flood began. The Facebook pages of Tsai Ing-wen, Apple Daily, and SET News were seriously flooded, and had to ban comments in order to stop the flood of spam messages. The members of the Flood team is also known as Little Pink. During this event, these Facebook pages were flooded by billions of meme pictures and stickers; it was therefore referred to as a meme war. Participants in the expedition deemed it successful and used its methods in subsequent responses to what they viewed as Western or Japanese transgressions.

=== 2018 flood on the Facebook pages of the Ministry for Foreign Affairs of Sweden ===
On 24 September 2018, the followers of Li Yi Bar organized a flood team again, in order to flood the Facebook pages of the Swedish Ministry for Foreign Affairs, Swedish television broadcasters, and Swedish TV host Jesper Rönndahl. These spammers sent myriads of comments, including profanity, to the targeted Facebook pages. More than ten thousand spam comments were left on Jesper Rönndahl's Facebook page. Most of these comments were later deleted.

=== Counteractions to the 2019 Hong Kong protests ===
On 21 July 2019, in solidarity with the Hong Kong government and the police force in the anti-extradition bill protest, the followers of Li Yi Bar claimed that a flood would be initiated on 23 July 2019 at 20:00. Their targets would include Facebook or LIHKG. However, the operation started in advance on 22 July 2019, and the Facebook pages of the Civil Human Rights Front and Hong Kong National Front were flooded. Very soon, some core members were doxed. On the same day, an admin of Li Yi Bar called off the operation "to prevent disturbing the normal life of Hong Kong citizens."

== See also ==
- Chinese nationalism
