= Erdoğan–Gollum comparison trials =

2010s and 2020s Turkish legal proceedings

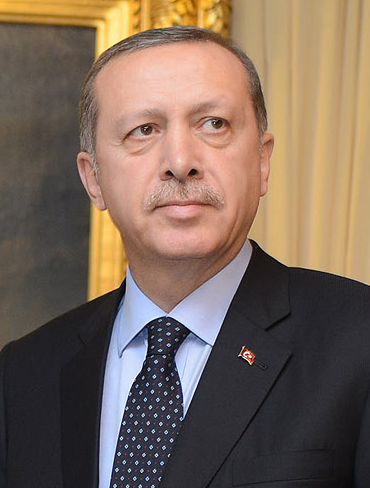
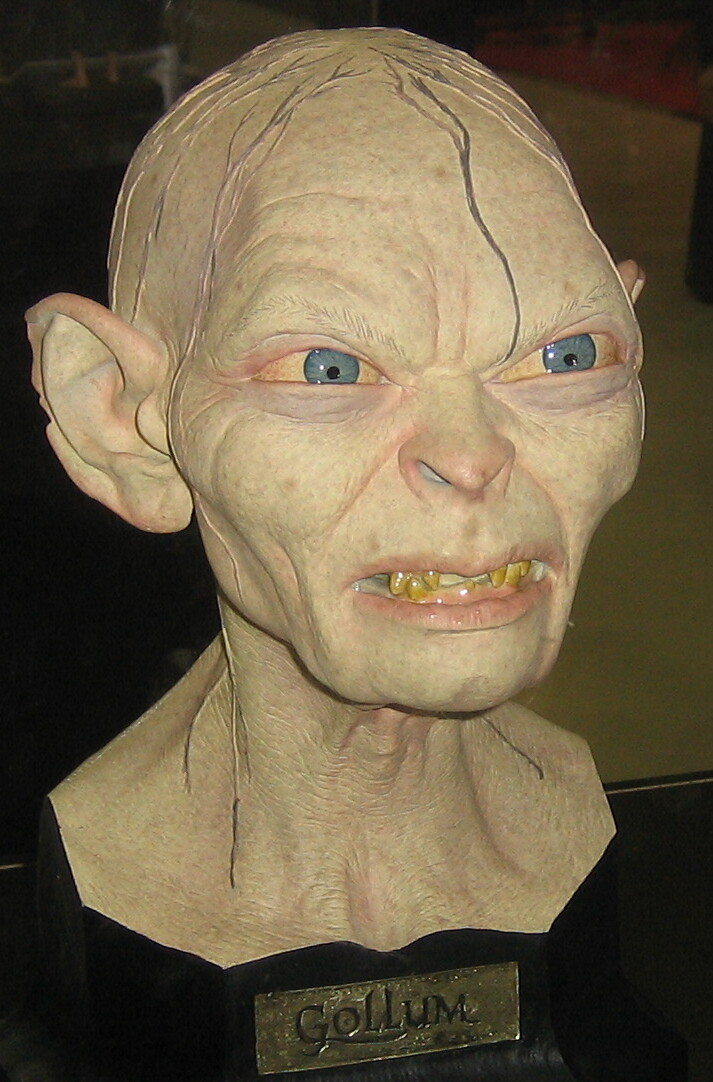
Recep Tayyip Erdoğan (left) has been compared to Gollum, which has led to multiple criminal trials for insulting the president

Recep Tayyip Erdoğan, the president of Turkey, has been compared to Gollum—a fictional character in J. R. R. Tolkien's novel The Lord of the Rings and its film adaptations—in social media posts, which has led to several trials for insulting the president in the 2010s and 2020s in Turkey.

== Background ==
Under Article 299 of the Turkish Penal Code, it is a punishable offense to insult the president; a violation can lead to a prison sentence of up to four years.

Gollum is a fictional character in J. R. R. Tolkien's Middle-earth fantasy novels, introduced in The Hobbit and given a major role in its sequel The Lord of the Rings. He subsequently appeared in the film adaptations as a pale-skinned creature wearing only a loincloth. Although portrayed as purely malevolent in The Hobbit, the later books gave him a more complex backstory, revealing that he had once been a hobbit named Sméagol who underwent a transformation through the supernatural influence of the One Ring.

== Trials ==
=== Rifat Çetin trial ===
In 2014, while Erdoğan was prime minister of Turkey, Rifat Çetin shared a Facebook post that included three photographs of Gollum beside three photographs of Erdoğan with similar facial expressions. In 2016 a court in Antalya delivered Çetin a suspended sentence of one year and the loss of his parental custody rights; he stated that he planned to appeal the decision, as Erdoğan was not a president at the time of the Facebook post. Çetin was acquitted on appeal in April 2017.

=== Bilgin Çiftçi trial ===
In August 2014, physician and civil servant Bilgin Çiftçi also shared an image comparing Erdoğan to Gollum. The post led to his dismissal from public service in October 2015. In December 2015, Çiftçi was formally charged, with the prosecution demanding a sentence of up to two years in prison. Çiftçi's lawyer argued that what her client did was protected speech, but this was ruled out by the court. The lawyer then argued that Gollum was not a bad character, following which the court in Aydın established an expert committee to investigate whether the comparison was an insult. The panel of expert witnesses was to consist of a film and television expert, two academics and two behavioral scientists or psychologists. The trial was adjourned until February 2016.

The case received global attention, with the director of The Lord of the Rings films, Peter Jackson, and the screen writers Fran Walsh and Philippa Boyens releasing a joint statement on the trial in December 2015. The statement argued that the images posted by Çiftçi actually depicted Sméagol, the joyful and helpful alter-ego of Gollum, and that the two characters should not be confused. US comedian and television host Stephen Colbert staged a show during which he performed as Çiftçi's lawyer dressed as actor Gregory Peck in the film To Kill A Mockingbird, demanding Çiftçi's release.

An initial evaluation prepared in April 2016 by the three experts was deemed insufficient as it was not delivered in only one file. A second report, prepared by a clinical psychologist, a psychologist, and an assistant professor of the Istanbul Bilgi University, was delivered in July and described Gollum as an oppressed and victimized personality, taking into account that Gollum returned to the original alter-ego Sméagol when he began to accompany the other hobbits. The experts examined relevant passages of the books and the films to come to their conclusion. In April 2017, Çiftçi was acquitted.

=== Barbaros Şansal trial ===
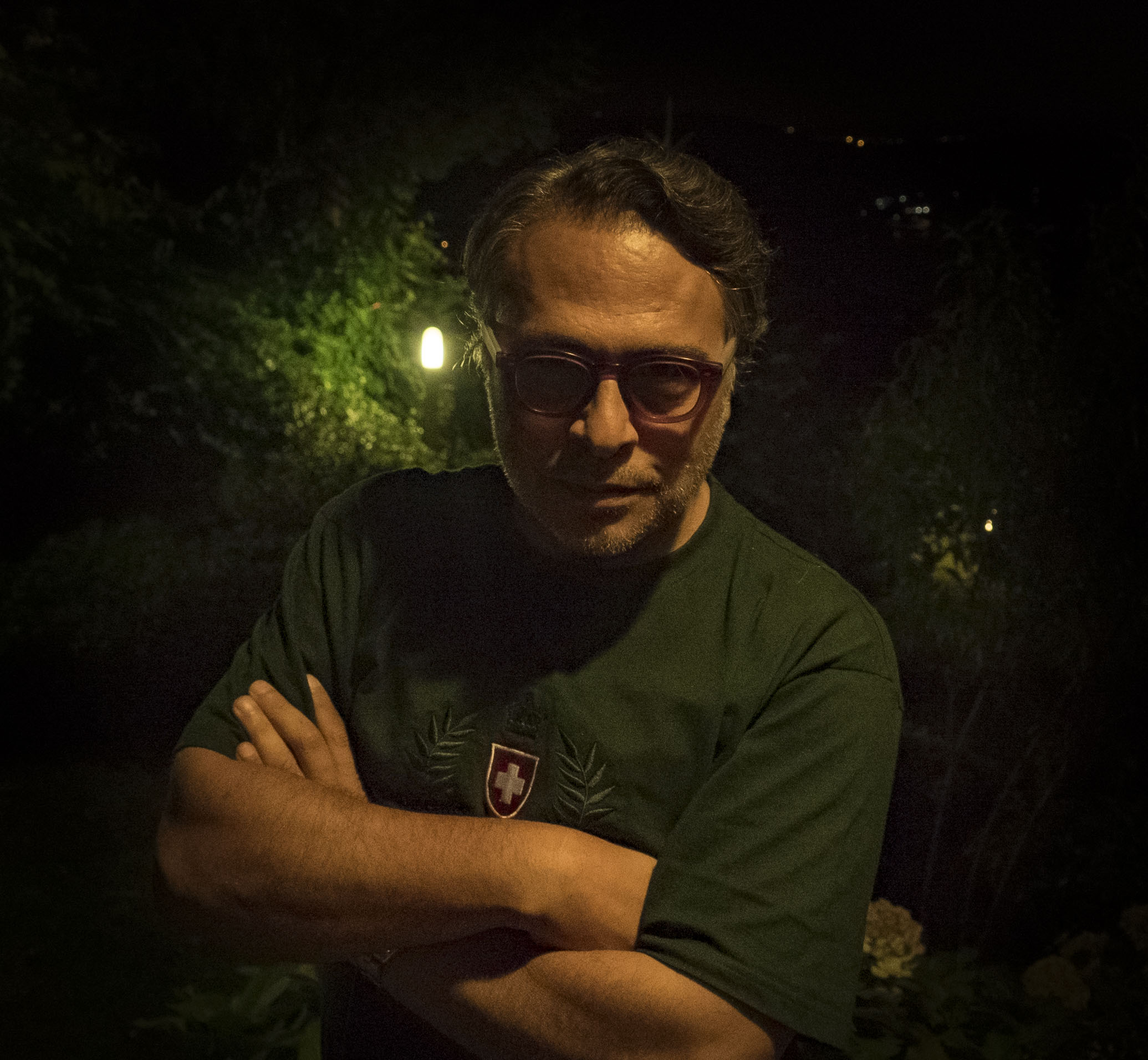
Barbaros Şansal in 2017

In December 2021, fashion designer Barbaros Şansal was sentenced to one year and two months in prison for having retweeted the photographs posted by Bilgin Çiftçi. Şansal claimed that he had retweeted the post only after he had heard the decision of the court that Gollum is "a helpful and good character". Erdoğan's lawyer appealed the verdict, demanding a higher sentence. However, in December 2022 the judges overturned the original prison sentence, as Şansal had already been tried on the same charge, and the case remained under review.

== See also ==
- Censorship of Winnie-the-Pooh in China, another case of censorship due to comparisons between a national leader and a fictional character
