= Little Pink =

Nationalistic group of Chinese internet users

Little Pink (Chinese: 小粉红; pinyin: xiǎo fěnhóng) is a term used to describe Chinese nationalists on the internet. They are primarily active on Chinese social media, with some active on social media sites blocked in China such as Facebook, Twitter, and Instagram. The term originated in 2008 to describe predominantly young female nationalists in internet fandom subcultures. After 2015, it became more broadly applied regardless of gender.

== History ==
Little Pink is a term used to describe young Chinese nationalists on the internet, often referring to female-led groups in fandom subcultures. They developed notoriety for their collective self-organized online "expeditions" on various social media platforms through which they promote their own views of nationalism and criticize individuals and groups with contrary views. They are primarily active on Chinese social media, with some active on social media sites blocked in China such as Twitter, Instagram, and YouTube. Little Pinks use popular cultural elements like memes, emojis, and political irony to advocate for nationalist viewpoints.

The term Little Pink was coined in 2008. It originated when a group of Jinjiang Literature City users started strongly criticizing people who published posts containing negative views and news about China. Within the website, this group became known as the "Jinjiang Girl Group Concerned for the Country", or the Little Pink, which was the main color of the website's front page. In 2011, the Little Pink group from Jinjiang Literature City had disagreements with the website administrator and left to set up their own site. The term "Little Pink" became popularized after a quarrel on Weibo between female nationalists and the Weibo personality Daguguguji, who is known for his liberal stance. Daguguguji used the term in a derogatory sense.

The term further spread in 2015 and 2016, starting with the "Di Ba expedition", also known as the Facebook Memes War. The expedition occurred after Taiwan idol singer Tzuyu displayed a Republic of China flag on a Korean television show (Tzuyu incident). A Taiwan pro-unification singer, Huang An, stated that Tzuyu supported Taiwan independence. The incident, which occurred in the run up to the 2016 elections on Taiwan, led to significant debate on Chinese social media. Members of Di Ba, a subforum of Baidu Tieba with a predominantly male user base, called for internet users to flood the comments sections of Facebook pages for Tzuyu, Tsai Ing-wen, and some Taiwan media organizations. Tens of thousands of people left comments including memes, ironic jokes, and insults. Participants in the expedition deemed it successful and used its methods in subsequent responses to what they viewed as Western or Japanese transgressions. The Di Ba expedition increased the use of the term "Little Pink" to refer to the younger generation of online Chinese nationalists, regardless of their gender.

Other occasions in which Little Pinks and the younger generation of Chinese online nationalists became notably active include the South China Sea arbitration case, the deployment of a Terminal High Altitude Area Defense system in South Korea, and the 2020-2021 China-India border skirmishes. During the 2019–2020 Hong Kong protests, Little Pinks also began describing themselves as "fandom girls". A frequent perspective contended by online fandom nationalists during the protests was that protestors had violated democratic principles by using street protests and attacks on police rather than advocating their positions through parliamentary means. In the first days of the 2022 Russian invasion of Ukraine, the Little Pink expressed pro-Russia sentiments on the Chinese internet.

== Members ==
The Little Pink are self-organized and not employed by the state like the 50 Cent Party. In terms of demographics, according to Zhuang Pinghui of South China Morning Post, 83% of the Little Pink are female, with most of them between 18 and 24 years old. More than half of the Little Pink are from third- and fourth-tier cities in China. In the 2016 Di Ba expedition, most of the active participants of the expedition were males, according to The China Project, citing research by Fang Kecheng.

According to Yu Liang, the Little Pink movement originates from the complex feelings of China's online youth. Among these: the desire to feel taken seriously, especially in comparison to the western world; the opposition to Chinese and international "universalist" intellectuals, as Little Pink feel they have failed by the promises of 1990s universalism and "end of history"; celebration of the Chinese state and state-owned enterprises, linked to a rise of Marxist views, as a reaction to inequality in Chinese society; sense of individual failure and powerlessness, related to the "lying flat" movement.

Journalist Zhang Shuyu describes Little Pink as "a burgeoning population of young Chinese netizens who voluntarily consume and promulgate fervent nationalist rhetoric, traditionally propelled by Chinese political elites to promote CPC legitimacy." According to Zhang, "Contrary to the depiction of them as an 'army of trolls,' 'little pinks' represent the complex, dynamic nature of China's new youth." They are "young people who idolize their country and their identity as Chinese, equipped with well-versed internet dialect to express this sentiment."

According to 2017 research by the Mercator Institute for China Studies, most Little Pinks are young, tech-savvy university students, and young professionals. Little Pinks tend to be male and to have travelled abroad more than average.

== Responses ==
The Central Committee of the Chinese Communist Party's official newspaper People's Daily and its daily tabloid Global Times have both praised the Little Pink, as has the Communist Youth League of China. Some Western critics have described Little Pink as ultranationalist or engaged in jingoism. In October 2021, the Little Pink were the subject of criticism by the satirical song "Fragile" by Malaysian singer Namewee and Australian singer Kimberley Chen.

== See also ==
- Fan activism
- Fenqing
- Vatnik
- Netto-uyoku
- State-sponsored influencer
