= Fenqing =

"angry youth" in China

Fenqing (simplified Chinese: 愤青; traditional Chinese: 憤青; pinyin: Fènqīng), or FQ (abbreviation), which is itself an abbreviation for Fennu Qingnian (simplified Chinese: 愤怒青年; traditional Chinese: 憤怒青年; pinyin: Fènnù Qīngnián), means literally "angry youth". It mainly refers to Chinese youth who display a high level of Chinese nationalism. This term first appeared in Hong Kong in the 1970s, referring to those young people who were not satisfied with Chinese society and sought reform. It has now evolved into a term used predominantly in Internet slang. Whether fenqing is derogatory or not usually depends on the person. Chinese critics often refer to them using the homophone characters "粪青" which are pronounced identically but translate to "shit-youth". This is often changed further to fènfèn (粪粪) as a derogatory nickname.

== Development ==
The phenomenon of fenqing arose after the reform and opening up of the Chinese government, during the period of fast economic development that occurred in China. Some people argue that fenqing are a natural reaction to recent neoconservatism in Japan and the neoconservatism in the United States. Fenqing and these foreign neo-conservative elements intensely dislike each other, but all of them share certain similarities: distrust of foreign powers, support for the military and boundary disputes, etc. However, fenqing are not to be confused with Chinese neoconservatives, who espouse a more pragmatic and gradualist approach to political reforms and favor the development of an "East Asian Community" with Japan and Korea, an idea that is anathema to the fenqing.

As a group, fenqing are diverse in their opinions. However, they are usually nationalistic and patriotic, are often left-wing in political ideology, and tend to defend Mao Zedong's controversial actions during the Great Leap Forward and the Cultural Revolution. The fenqing are very much concerned with political issues, especially in domestic policy relating to Tibet and foreign policy relating to Japan, Taiwan, or the United States.

They often harbour negative attitudes towards Japan due to the invasion of China by Imperial Japan, and support aggressive political stances towards Japan. For example, some believe that the Japanese government's apologies for Japanese war crimes are insincere and inadequate (some even believe no apologies will ever be adequate). More recent incidents, such a former Japanese prime minister's patronage of the Yasukuni Shrine, territorial disputes surrounding the Senkaku Islands (known as Diaoyu in China), and the revisions of history textbooks by uyoku dantai (Japanese right-wing extremists), lead these young people to conclude that the Japanese government is again seeking to expand militarily. These anti-Japanese sentiments are not necessarily only directed against the Japanese government and military, but often fiercely towards the Japanese culture, economy, and people.

Fenqing also refers to "20-somethings often use the Internet to publicly express their views on politics and society."

== See also ==
- Little Pink
- Angry white man – a similar phenomenon among white American and Australian men
- Chinese nationalism
- Netto-uyoku
