= Daguguguji =

Chinese writer and internet personality

Daguguguji (Chinese: 大咕咕咕鸡) is a Chinese author and internet personality, also known by various names such as Fú lǒu mì (Chinese: 佛搂蜜), and Zhāngdà chuí (Chinese: 张大锤). He is often referred to by some of his readers as the literary master (Chinese: 严肃文学大师) and the grand master (Chinese: 特师).

== Works ==
Daguguguji first gained the attention of Chinese netizens through his writings on electronics forums such as Hi!PDA and TGFC. Currently, Sina Weibo is his main channel for publishing his writings, with topics ranging from cultural commentary to political satire. His works are marked by their use of Defamiliarization, often achieved by the use of local dialects and made-up words.

== Influence ==
As of 2018, Daguguguji has reached more than three million followers on Sina Weibo, the Chinese equivalent of Twitter. His unique style of writing and his creation of new phrases have a wide influence among his readers and even the general public. Daguguguji is known for his assertive style and liberal views.

Daguguguji popularized the term "Little Pink" in 2015 as part of an online quarrel he had with female nationalists on Weibo. Daguguguji used the term in a derogatory sense. In 2016, pro-establishment news publication Global Times criticized him for doing so.
