= Tag Me =

#Tag Me

Studio album by Kimberley Chen
- Released: 15 December 2017
- Recorded: 2017
- Genre: Mandopop
- Length: 29:20
- Language: Chinese
- Labels: Sharp Music (production); Universal Music Taiwan (release)
- Producer: zh:阿弟仔

Kimberley Chen chronology
Kimbonomics (2013)	#Tag Me (2017)

Singles from #Tag Me
- 1. "Tag Me" Released: 14 December 2017; 2. "Where I Belong" Released: 2017; 3. "One More Day" Released: 2018; 4. "Thank You For Nothing" Released: 2018

#Tag Me is the third studio album from Kimberley Chen, produced by Sharp Music, released by Universal Music Taiwan on 15 December 2017. Its first single, "Tag Me", is a fusion of hip hop and dance, which is different from her previous style. "Where I Belong" is the second single from the album, features the rapper Miss Ko who wrote the song. The music video for the third single, "One More Day", features the actor Derek Chang.

This album is her first in 4 years after the release of Kimbonomics. It is also the first album she released after signing a record deal with Sharp Music.

== Track listing ==
#Tag Me CD track listing
No.	Title	Lyrics	Music	Length
1.	"Unromantic" (我不浪漫)	Chen Xinyan	Andrew Underberg; April Michelle Bender	4:10
2.	"Tag Me"	Nese; Zhou Qimin	Nese; Song Xingkai	2:31
3.	"Where I Belong" (ft. Miss Ko; 家在哪裡)	Miss Ko	Miss Ko; Hai	3:16
4.	"One More Day" (再愛我一天)	Angel Chen; Wu I-wei	Angel Chen; JerryC	4:04
5.	"Thank You For Nothing" (謝謝你沒有很愛我)	Zhou	Wu Zhenhao	4:34
6.	"For You" (為你)	Boon Hui Lu	Boon; WaiiHoong	3:32
7.	"I Want You To Love Me"	Weibird Wei	Wei	4:06
8.	"Gold Star" (摘一顆星星)	Dino Chun	Terrytyelee	3:07
Total length:				29:20

== Music videos ==
Title	Director	Date	Channel	Note
Tag Me	Huang Ziran	14 December 2017	Tag Me on YouTube	Lead single
Where I Belong	Born Li	28 December 2017	Where I Belong on YouTube	Second single
One More Day	Shawn Yu	30 January 2018	One More Day on YouTube	Third single
Thank You For Nothing		30 March 2018	Thank You For Nothing on YouTube	Fourth single

== Live performance ==
=== Promotional concert ===
Year	Date	Title	Venue	Note
2017	24 December	Kimberley Chen【#Tag Me】Album Promotion Concert	Taipei RedHouse	
2017	30 December	Kimberley Chen【#Tag Me】Album Promotion Concert	Tainan Southern Park	
2017	30 December	Kimberley Chen【#Tag Me】Album Promotion Concert	Taichung Taroko Mall	
