= Barbaros Şansal =

Turkish fashion designer and activist

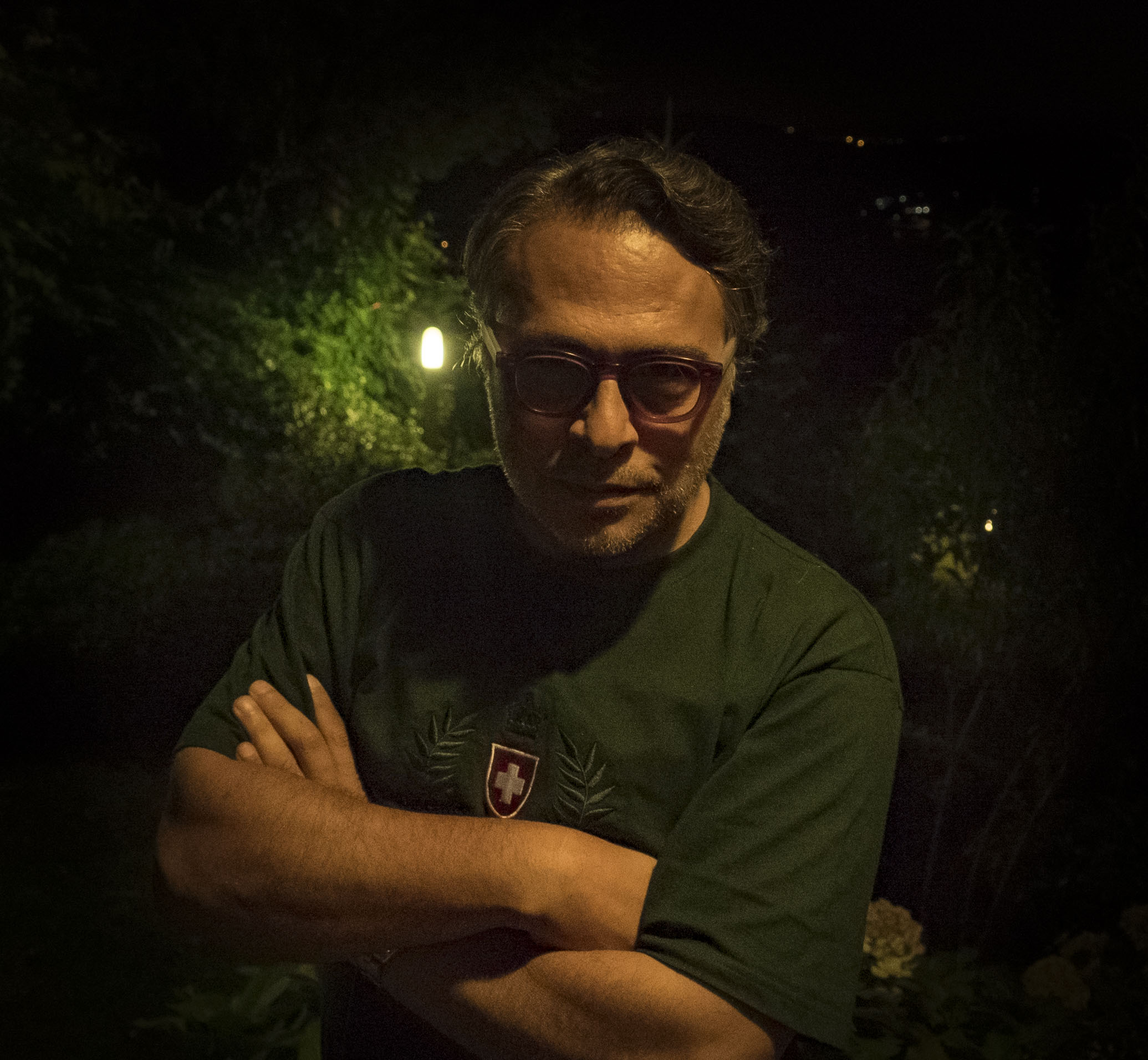
- Born: 10 July 1959 (age 66); Ankara, Turkey
- Occupation: Fashion designer
- Known for: Fashion, activism

Barbaros Şansal (born 10 July 1959) is a Turkish fashion designer and activist.

== Early life and career ==
Şansal was born in 1959 in Turkey’s capital Ankara as the child of Sungur Tekin Şansal and Güner Eczacıbaşı. He studied Business Management at Marmara University and mastered in design and chromatics at the Royal Academy of Arts in London, before becoming an apprentice to prominent fashion designer Yıldırım Mayruk. Besides being a fashion designer, Şansal is also known as an LGBT rights advocate and an anti-war activist.

Barbaros Şansal hosted two TV programmes on Turkish TV channels called “Pin” and “Safety Pin”. He also wrote two books called “Printing Ink Lives on Newsprint” and “Fitting Room”. He translated the book “101 things I Learned in Fashion School” written by Matthew Frederick and Alfredo Cabrera. Şansal gave lectures about the history of fashion at Marmara University and Ankara Baskent University.

In September 2020, Barbaros Şansal and Yıldırım Mayruk bid farewell to their fashion careers with a theatrical jubilee in Istanbul.

== Political and legal issues ==
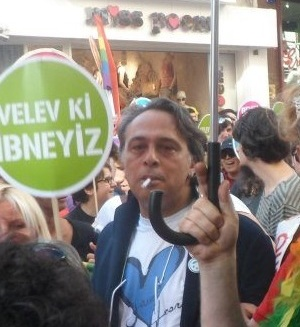
Şansal at Istanbul gay pride in 2012

Barbaros Şansal took part in the Gezi Park protests in 2013, which took place very close to his offices in Istanbul's Beyoğlu neighbourhood. He was reportedly detained and threatened by police after criticising the police's use of excessive force on Halk TV.

In May 2015, Şansal was found in possession of 6 grams of cannabis at Ercan Airport in Cyprus, where he had recently bought a house. Şansal was released on condition that he paid ₺40 thousand bail. He was sentenced to one month in prison in November 2015.

On 1 January 2017, while at his residence in North Cyprus, Şansal shared a video on social media in which he criticised Turkish society: "While scores of journalists are in prison, while children are sexually harassed, raped, while corruption and bribes are everywhere, while |extremists are distributing shit to you in the streets, are you still celebrating the New Year? I am not... Carry on your celebration in disgrace, misery and dirt. Drown in your shit, Turkey."

Because of these words, the Turkish Republic of North Cyprus Interior Ministry detained Şansal and deported him to Atatürk Airport by airplane. After landing at the airport, Şansal was physically and verbally attacked by people on the tarmac. After being taken into custody by the police, he was taken to court and was arrested the following day charged with ‘inciting the public to hatred or hostility’ under Article 216 of the Turkish Penal Code. Şansal said that the words he used were "a satire against discrimination" and did not accept the accusations directed against him.

Şansal was released from prison on March 2, 2017, but faces charges of 'insulting the Turkish nation' which carry a penalty of one to three years in prison. Following his release from prison, Şansal wrote about his treatment in prison in a book about his arrest and attempted lynching.

Şansal and Mayruk have decided to close their business in Turkey and move to Cyprus. They gave a farewell fashion show in September 2020, which was moderated by Mert Fırat as well as Tuğçe Sarıkaya Dağıstan.

In December 2022, he was sentenced to 1 year and 2 months for insulting the president after he tweeted a picture of Recep Tayyip Erdoğan beside one of Gollum from Lord of the Rings. Erdoğan's lawyer appealed demanding a higher sentence and in January 2023, the verdict was overturned by a regional alleging repeated trials with the same charge.

== Personal life ==
Şansal is an atheist. In November 2014, it was reported that Şansal became a member of the Atheism Association. In September 2015, he was elected to the board of directors of the Atheism Association. Şansal resides in the Turkish Republic of Northern Cyprus.
