= Fragile (Namewee song) =

Single by Namewee and Kimberley Chen

from the album Ghosician
- Language: Mandarin Chinese
- Released: 15 October 2021
- Genre: Mandopop
- Length: 3:58
- Songwriter: Namewee
- Producers: Namewee and Peter Chong

Music video
- 《玻璃心》official MV on YouTube

"Fragile" (Chinese: 玻璃心; pinyin: bōlí xīn; Wade–Giles: po^{¹}li^{²} hsin^{¹}; lit. 'glass heart') is a Mandarin single by Malaysian singer Namewee and Australian singer Kimberley Chen released on 15 October 2021. On YouTube, the song had over 15 million views within days, and it held the top spot of Hong Kong, Taiwan, Malaysia and Singapore's music trends for several weeks. Written as a comedic pop duet and featuring a dancing panda in the music video, "Fragile" satirizes the social issues in China, the political status of Taiwan, the Xinjiang re-education camps, censorship in China, as well as the Little Pinks' response.

== Production ==
The song is composed in the key of E major, and has a tempo of 94 beats per minute. The lyrics includes phrases used in communication between lovers: 'You claim that (I belong to you); don't deny (ask me to return); never let go any part (give me an explanation)'. However, this is a metaphor for the government of the People's Republic of China's attitude toward Taiwan's sovereignty and that over the South China Sea. The line 'Over there, fuming with anger, you curse my mommy' can be interpreted as referring to the use of the Internet slang NMSL (Chinese: 你妈死了; pinyin: nǐmāsǐle; lit. 'Your mother died') when insulting others. The music video is also full of references to controversial issues in China, including depicting Xi Jinping as Winnie-the-Pooh, stirring a pot of bat soup, and swallowing an apple.

== Response ==
=== China ===
Sina Weibo blocked Namewee and Kimberley Chen's accounts, while other Chinese platforms such as Douyin and Baidu Tieba have also hidden the song after its release. State-owned tabloid Global Times described the song as "malicious" and said, with no ironic undertone, that it had "insulted the Chinese people".

=== Kimberley Chen ===
In a social media post attaching an adapted version of "Fragile", Kimberley Chen mentioned that she does not care about being blocked by Weibo because she has accounts on Facebook and Instagram.

=== Namewee ===
As a response to getting banned in China, Namewee states in a post that he does not think that he is banned, as the ones who are truly banned are those who have been denied the right to listen to songs freely.

=== Scholarly views ===
Jeroen de Kloet, a professor of media studies at the University of Amsterdam, said that the song was about censorship and that its censorship in China only amplified its impact.

Geremie Barmé, a sinologist at the Australian National University, praised the song for its "celebration of joyfulness while also being politically pointed", saying also that it "offers a valuable lesson for the world about China and its increasingly complex cultural reach". Kwei-Bo Huang from the department of diplomacy at National Chengchi University expressed his belief that the song would intensify the disputes across the Taiwan Strait, but that nothing could be done about this in a short timeframe; he expected that people with insight on both sides of the strait would eventually reverse this.

=== NFT ===
On 7 November 2021, non-fungible tokens of "Fragile" were sold for 209 ETH, netting the singers around 27 million NTD within three hours of launch.

== Charts ==
=== Weekly charts ===
Chart Performance for "Fragile"
Charts (2021)	Peak Position
Hong Kong (KKBOX Mandarin singles)	1
Malaysia (KKBOX Mandarin singles)	1
Taiwan (Hit FM)	1
Taiwan (KKBOX Mandarin singles)	1
Singapore (KKBOX Mandarin singles)	1
Singapore (YES 933 Top 20)	1

== Accolades ==
Awards and nominations
Year	Awards	Category	Result	Ref.
2021	Google YouTube Yearly Chart in Taiwan	Top7 Hot Music Videos	Won	
2022	7th Lavender Music Awards	Most Popular Song	Nominated	
2022	2022 Hito Music Awards	Hito Duet Song	Won	
2022	33rd Golden Melody Awards	Song of the Year	Nominated	
2022	4th Walk Bell John Awards	Best Music Video	Won	
