= Cyber manhunt in Hong Kong =

A cyber manhunt (Chinese: 起底) in Hong Kong is a term for the behavior of tracking down and exploring an individual's private information via internet media. A cyber manhunt generally involves netizens and is regarded as the purpose of a cyber judgment to the target through blaming, shaming, and naming culprits.

== Background ==
A cyber manhunt is developed from the word ‘manhunt’. A manhunt is a way of searching background information of an objective person. The term is broadly used by the police and media. Manhunts were limited during the use of traditional media in the 1990s because of technological constraints. However, cyber manhunts became popular in the 21st century. It gained popularity on the ‘Hong Kong Golden Forum’ and thus spread to other social media websites.

The emergence of cyber manhunts was led by the common practice of sharing individual photographs and information on social networks. Owing to the exploitation of cyberspace technology, more and more free social networking websites appear nowadays, (i.e. Qzone, Tencent QQ, Tencent Video, Weibo, etc.) People are then more willing to share their daily lives on the web. This trend highly raises the accessibility of various internet users to one's personal information.

== Method ==
=== Application of search engine ===
One of the methods is to make use of search engines to obtain the information of people. Netizens search the target by using multitudes of search engines, including Baidu, Petal, Sogou, etc. They type the keywords or the name of the target into the search engines to find related websites, for instance, the social networking sites, private blogs, and albums of the target. They can obtain the target's private information by visiting those websites. Eventually, they would post and show the information they get to the public through the internet.

=== Browsing public online platforms ===
Moreover, there are columns in public online platforms called the ‘Column for betraying friends’. Netizens usually post the private information and photos of their friends in these columns. For instance: telephone numbers, emails, addresses, etc. Other netizens would browse these columns and obtain information. Some of them even criticize targets in columns, causing cyber bullying.

== Purpose ==
=== Expression of dissatisfaction ===
Cyber manhunt gives the Netizens a good channel to let off their anger and dissatisfaction with the society and social phenomenon. Once an undesirable subject is posted on the internet, it can easily trigger or anger netizens. For instance, "Kong girl 500" rejected people to come to her wedding with $500 for a blessing on her Facebook. She has exposed most of her personal information and wedding location on the internet. It reveals the dissatisfaction of netizen toward "Kong girl" and money worship.

=== Acquisition of satisfaction ===
People have the desire for discourse power which they are not given in traditional media while able to get in the cyberspace. Dennis Wong, the Professor of Applied Social Sciences of City University, indicated that cyber manhunt is a behavior that wishes own happiness and satisfaction by causing pain to others. He explained that some netizens obtain happiness and satisfaction via a cyber manhunt, and some of them will even see it as a network game to increase their sense of identity if they can find more information than others.

=== Sense of justice ===
Some cyber manhunt was motivated by the sense of justice and some of the netizens use cyber manhunt as a punishment for the individuals who act inappropriately or immorally. There exist many examples of cyber manhunt about moral and ethical issues. For example, some animal abusers have been arrested because of the power of cyber manhunt.

== Influences ==
=== Influences on victims ===
Victims who suffer trauma from cyber manhunts may leave an indelible imprint worrying about what people browse to them. They are also at risk of getting mental and psychological damage. Also, a common thing to happen to victims is that they would continuously search the situation on the internet and know how the event goes on. It deteriorates victims’ mental health and may even stimulate them to commit suicide.

=== Influences on netizens ===
Some netizens may also endure emotional distress and fear of becoming the next target of cyber manhunt. They do not need to be consciously responsible for their actions. Therefore, they may criticize others easily. When the cyber manhunt occurs in an uncontrolled situation, some netizens would dread to be the next target.

== Related law ==
The netizens who involve in cyber manhunt or explore other's private information without permission may violate the following laws.

=== Universal declaration of human rights ===
No one shall be subjected to arbitrary interference with his privacy, family, home or correspondence, nor to attacks upon his honor and reputation. Everyone has the right to the protection of the law against such interference or attacks.

=== Personal Data Ordinance ===
According to the Personal Data Ordinance which was enacted in 2012, a person commits an offense if the person discloses any personal data of a data subject which was obtained from a data user without the data user's consent, with an intent to cause loss or gain in other property or cause harm to the data subject.

The netizen will commit an offense if they disclose one's private information on the internet without consent. However, Joe Lam, the chief executive officer of Discussion forum points out that it is hard to the law like the speed of communication on the internet is too fast and it is hard to determine if there has been any contravention as Cyber manhunt always involve countless netizens.
