= Kimberley (album) =

Studio album by Kimberley Chen
- Released: 27 April 2012
- Recorded: 2011–2012
- Genre: Mandopop
- Length: 46:58
- Label: Sony Music Taiwan

Kimberley Chen chronology
Kimberley (2012)	Kimbonomics 金式代 (2013)

Kimberley is the first self-titled and debut album by Australian singer-songwriter, Kimberley Chen, which was released on 27 April 2012.

== Track listing ==
CD
No.	Title	Writer(s)	Producer(s)	Length
1.	"Love You"	Skot Suyama; Kimberley; 黃祖蔭	Skot Suyama	3:28
2.	"Star Trek (ft.Princess Ai)"	Terrytyelee; Victor Wai-Tak Lau; Kimberley	Terrytyelee; Lau	4:06
3.	"Satellite"	Terrytyelee; Kimberley	Terrytyelee	4:30
4.	"Wonderland"	Terrytyelee; Kimberley	Terrytyelee	4:28
5.	"Can't Live Without You"	Terrytyelee; 王知音; Jaydaone; 姜憶萱; 趙心蕾	Terrytyelee; 王知音	4:47
6.	"Can't Do Without Me"	Terrytyelee; 王知音; Kimberley	Terrytyelee	4:40
7.	"Friday"	Terrytyelee; 王知音	Terrytyelee	4:10
8.	"Nike Air"	Terrytyelee; 王知音	Terrytyelee	4:02
9.	"GPS"	Terrytyelee; 王知音; Daryl Yao	Terrytyelee	4:51
10.	"So Good"	Terrytyelee; Ezekiel "Muzique" Kieran	Terrytyelee; Ezekiel "Muzique" Kieran	4:29
11.	"Never Change"	Skot Suyama; Kimberley	Skot Suyama	3:22

== Awards and nominations ==
Year	Award	Category	Nominated work	Result	Ref.
2012	Metro Radio Hits Awards	Best New Overseas Singer	Herself	Won	
2012	Metro Radio Hits Awards	Digital Songs of the Year	Love You	Won	
2013	Ultimate Song Chart Awards Presentation	Top 10 Songs	Love You	Won	
2013	Ultimate Song Chart Awards Presentation	My Favorite Songs	Love You	Nominated	
2013	Ultimate Song Chart Awards Presentation	Best New Female Artist	Herself	Gold Award	
2013	Top Ten Chinese Gold Songs Award Concert	Top Mandarin Songs	Love You	Gold Award	
2013	Top Ten Chinese Gold Songs Award Concert	Top 10 Chinese Songs	Love You	Nominated	
2013	Top Ten Chinese Gold Songs Award Concert	Best New Artist	Herself	Merit	
2013	Top Ten Chinese Gold Songs Award Concert	Top 10 Artists	Herself	Nominated	
2013	KKBOX Music Awards	KKBOX Top 100 Singles	Love You	2nd Place	
2013	KKBOX Music Awards	KKBOX Top 100 Albums	Kimberley	2nd Place	
2013	Neway Karaoke Music Awards	Top 5 Overseas Songs	Love You	Won	
