= Kimberley Chen =

Australian pop singer and actress

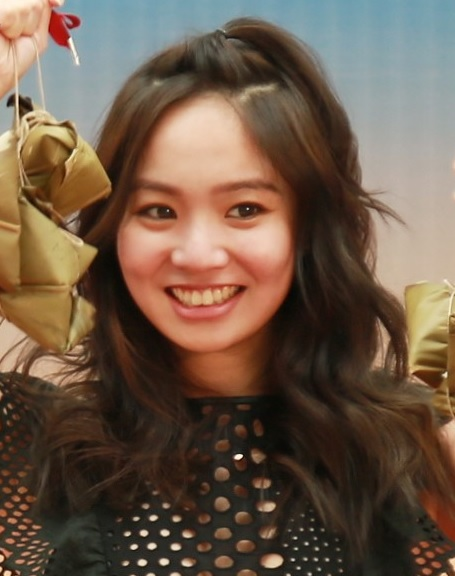
- Chen in 2019
- Born: 23 May 1994 (age 32); Melbourne, Victoria, Australia
- Occupations: Singer; actress; model
- Years active: 2012–present
- Musical career
- Origin: Australia
- Labels: JYP (2005–2009); Sony Music Entertainment (Taiwan) (2012–2014); B.ANGEL (2014–2016); Sharp Music (2017–2019); Chynahouse (2020–present)

Chinese name
- Traditional Chinese: 陳芳語
- Simplified Chinese: 陈芳语
Transcriptions
Standard Mandarin
- Hanyu Pinyin: Chén Fāngyǔ
Southern Min
- Hokkien POJ: Tân Phang-gí

Kimberley Chen (born 23 May 1994) is an Australian singer, actress and model based in Taiwan. In 2009, she landed her first hit with the love ballad "愛你" (Aini, "Love You"). In 2012, she became a professional singer in Taiwan, singing in both English and Mandarin.

Chen has been banned in Mainland China as a result of the song and music video "Fragile" a collaboration with Malaysian-Chinese hip hop artist Namewee which went viral in October 2021.

In 2020, she signed to Chynahouse, belonging to Kkbox, the first streaming platform and largest digital conglomerate in Taiwan.

== Early and personal life ==
Chen grew up in Melbourne as the daughter of Malaysian migrants. She attended Tintern Grammar and the Victorian College of the Arts.

Chen began her singing career at the age of four, first coached by her father. She performed regularly at charity concerts and clubs. Later, she was trained by Vladimir Vasilev, the conductor and musical director of the Russian Bolshoi Ballet for over five years. She learnt Ballet, Pointe, Tap, Jazz, Contemporary, HipHop, Locking, Popping, acrobatics and acting. She was offered three scholarships by the age of 10 but had to turn them down due to her other work. She was the only child model on Nine Network's The Price Is Right. In 2005 and 2006, she appeared as Young Nala in the Broadway production of Disney's The Lion King in Melbourne and Shanghai.

From a young age, Chen was an active performer and actress. She appeared in numerous commercials such as a McDonald's commercial that aired throughout Asia.

During the East Timor Crisis, she donated to Caritas Australia to directly aid East Timor. At the age of eight, she sang and danced a rendition of Jennifer Lopez's song, Let's Get Loud, with back-up dancers on the Royal Children's Hospital's 2003 Good Friday Appeal fundraiser on the Seven Network.

Discovered by Grundy Television executive director Michael Whyte, Chen was offered an ongoing role as the featured child model on The Price Is Right for its 2003 revival. She performed in over 400 episodes on the Nine Network over 2 1/2 years.

Later in 2005, Chen was selected by JYP Entertainment in New York City as a trainee to debut in America. Yolanda Wyns trained her in singing, dancing, and acting. She left JYP Entertainment in 2009 when the company decided to close down their U.S. operations. She was offered to become a trainee in South Korea instead but since her parents didn't have any plans to relocate to South Korea she turned down the offer. Chen attended Stella Adler Studio of Acting and recorded with Grammy-award winners Gordon Chambers and Barry Eastmond. She was also trained by Jermaine Browne and Jazzy J. In March 2007, Chen was selected to sing the national anthem at the Australian Football League NAB Cup Grand Final.

Chen's whole family relocated to Taiwan in 2009 to pursue her professional singing career. When arriving, she had little command of Mandarin. She studied the language intensively, which was key to her ability to succeed in the Asian music market. In March 2010, she was invited to compete in the Taiwanese televised singing competition One Million Star. She was then asked to be the guest singer for Kelly Clarkson's All I Ever Wanted World Tour in Taipei. Chen has released eight studio albums and is currently signed to Chynahouse.

In 2023 she was nominated for a Golden Melody Award for song of the year. The following year she released her self produced album KIKI and then another in 2025 titled Colors of Love.

In 2026 she won KKBOX award for Top Artist of the Year.

== Music career ==
=== 2012: Debut with Kimberley ===
After nearly three years of preparation, Chen's debut album was released on 27 April 2012, featuring six Mandarin songs and five English songs. Two of her songs were featured on the Taiwanese series Fondant Garden starring Park Jung-min. Her debut single "愛你 (Love You)" has been a success on YouTube, with over 106 million views and generally positive comments.

Chen's second single, "Never Change," was her debut in songwriting. Chen has released music videos of her two singles: 愛你 (Love You), also starring JPM, and "廖允傑" (LilJay). They have been a success on YouTube, gaining over 15 million views. In Taiwan, she has come first in KKBOX charts with her debut album ezPeer, 台灣大哥大, 中華電信 and 遠傳電信, topping ringtone download charts.

Chen briefly worked with the B.ANGEL production house in 2014 before signing with Hong Kong–based company Sharp Music and Universal Music. She appeared in the Chinese version of Produce 101 in 2018. She was appointed A+, the highest ranking in the show, and received over 4.3 billion views for each of her performances.

=== 2013: Kimbonomics ===
Sony Music announced on 16 December 2013, that Chen would be releasing her second studio album, Kimbonomics. The album was released on 25 December 2013 and contained 10 tracks. It placed 4th on the weekly music charts of KKBOX in Taiwan on 25 January 2014.

=== 2017–2018: #Tag Me and Produce 101 China ===
In late 2017, Chen released her third studio album, #Tag Me. In 2018 she was one of the participants in Produce 101 and finished No. 26.

In 2019, Chen left Sharp Music due to Sharp Music's breach of contract. She dropped all charges in hope for peace but they continued to defame her using the media. She then filed for defamation and they were forced to stop harassing her. According to sources they unrightfully took a lot of her money.

=== 2020: Princess Tendencies ===
Not long after signing with ChynaHouse Chen recorded a 31 track album. She decided to call and market it as a mixtape. She collaborated with over five artists.

=== 2021: WFH ===
During the pandemic she self recorded her WFH EP MINI ALBUM in her home studio. The whole project took less than six months to complete.

=== 2024: KIKI ===
In 2024 Chen released her 7th studio album titled kiki. Her album highlights and raises awareness on animal rights and global warming.

=== 2025: Colors of Love ===
Just after her contract ended with her label ChynaHouse, Chen worked on her album with well renowned producer Skot Suyama. They previously worked together on Chen’s first album.

== Discography ==
- Kimberley (2012)
- Kimbonomics (2013)
- #Tag Me (2017)
- Princess Tendencies (2020)
- WFH (2021)
- Up on the Roof (2022)
- KIKI (2024)
- Colors of Love (2025)

== Filmography ==
=== Television ===
Year	Title	Network	Ref.
2003	Good Friday Appeal	Seven Network	
2003–05	The Price Is Right	Nine Network	
2007	2007 NAB Cup	Seven Network	
2010	One Million Star	China Television	

=== Music video appearances ===
- 2012 – "Internet", from Kimberley with JPM
- 2021 – "玻璃心 Fragile", from 鬼才做音樂 Ghosician with Namewee 黃明志

== Awards and nominations ==
=== 2012 Metro Radio Mandarin Hits Music Awards Presentation ===
Year	Award	Nominated work	Result	Ref.
2012	Metro Best Overseas Rookie	Herself	Won	

=== Global Chinese Pop chart ===
Year	Award	Nominated work	Result	Ref.
2012	Most Promising Rookie	Herself	Won	

=== 2012 Metro Hit Awards ===
Year	Award	Nominated work	Result	Ref.
2012	Metro Best New Media Song	Love You	Won	
2012	Best Overseas Rookie	Herself	Won	

=== 2012 Ultimate Song Chart Awards Presentation ===
Year	Award	Nominated work	Result	Ref.
2013	Top 10 Songs	Love You	Won	
2013	Best New Artist	Herself	Gold Award	

=== 2012 Top Ten Chinese Gold Songs Award Concert ===
Year	Award	Nominated work	Result	Ref.
2013	Best Mandarin Song	Love You	Gold Award	
2013	Most Promising New Artist	Herself	Merit	

=== Canadian Chinese Music Pop chart ===
Year	Award	Nominated work	Result	Ref.
2013	Top 10 Songs	Love You	Won	

=== KKBOX Music Awards ===
Year	Award	Nominated work	Result	Ref.
2013	Top 100 Songs	Love You	2nd place	
2013	Top 100 albums	Kimberley	2nd place	
2013	Best New Artist	Herself	Won	

=== Global Chinese Golden Chart Awards ===
Year	Award	Nominated work	Result	Ref.
2013	Best New Artist	Herself	Silver Award	

=== 2013 HITO Music Awards ===
Year	Award	Nominated work	Result	Ref.
2013	Most Popular New Artist	Herself	Won	

=== Neway Karaoke Songs chart ===
Year	Award	Nominated work	Result	Ref.
2013	Top 5 Overseas Songs	Love You	Won	

=== 2015 Music King Awards ===
Year	Award	Nominated work	Result	Ref.
2015	Best New Artist in Taiwan	Herself	Won	

=== 2022 Golden Melody Awards ===
Year	Award	Nominated work	Result	Ref.
2022	Song of the Year	Herself	Nominated	

=== 2022 HITO Music Awards ===
Year	Award	Nominated work	Result	Ref.
2022	Song of the Year	Herself	Won	

=== 2023 KKBOX Music Awards ===
Year	Award	Nominated work	Result	Ref.
2023	Artist of the Year	Herself	Won	

=== 2026 KKBOX Music Awards ===
Year	Award	Nominated work	Result	Ref.
2026	Artist of the Year	Herself	Won	
