= Elva Hsiao discography =

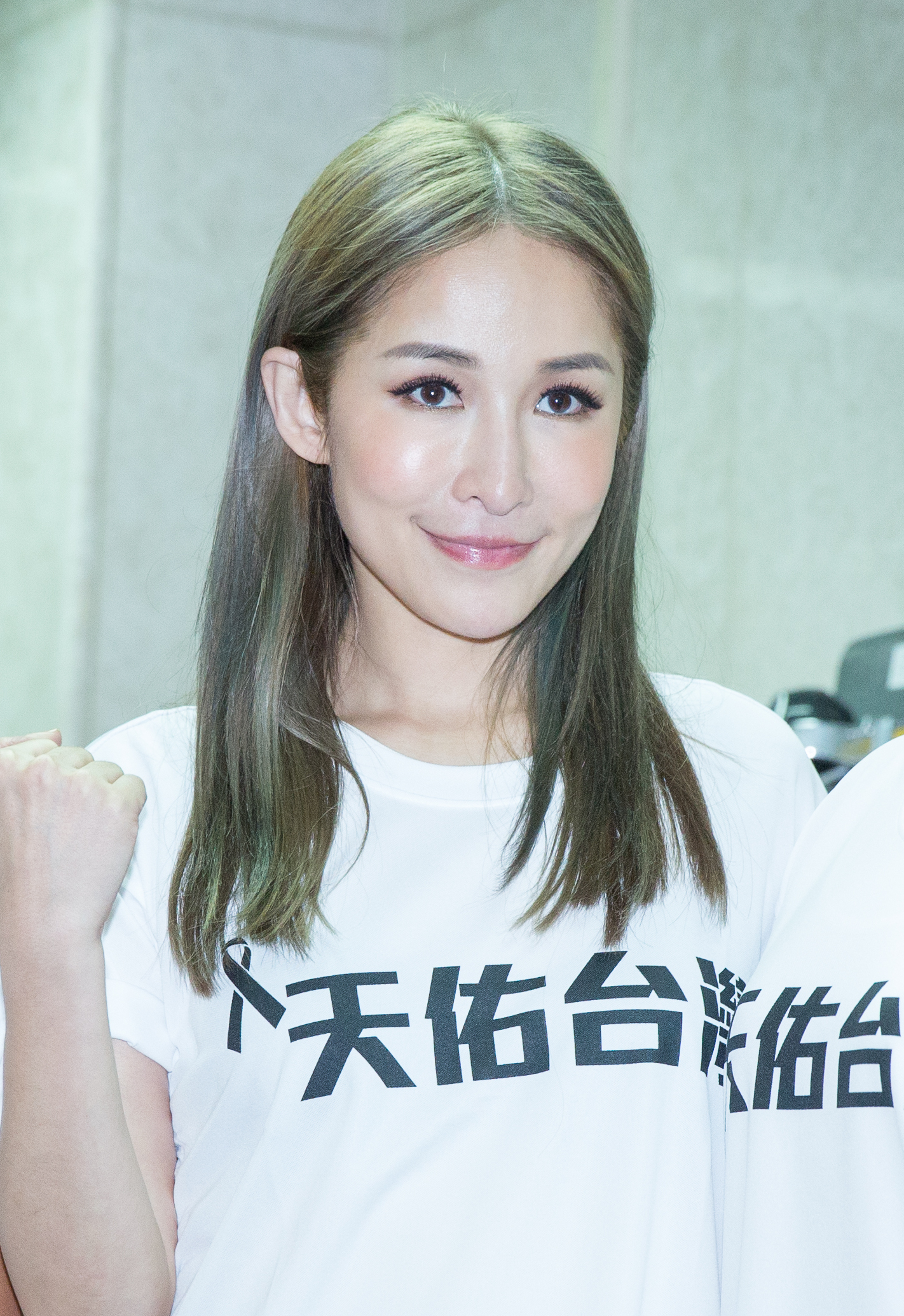
- Hsiao in 2014
- Studio albums: 15
- Compilation albums: 3
- Live albums: 2

The discography of Taiwanese singer Elva Hsiao (Chinese: 蕭亞軒) consists of fifteen studio albums, three compilation albums, and two live albums. Her debut album, Elva First Album, was released in November 1999 and sold more 500,000 copies in Taiwan, becoming the best-selling album of the year. It sold an estimated 1.5 million copies across Asia.

Her second album, Red Rose (2000), became only one of the dozen albums to have sold over 300,000 copies in Taiwan since 2000. It likewise went on to sell over 1.5 million copies across Asia.

== Studio albums ==
Title	Album details	Peak chart positions		Sales
Title	Album details	TWN	SGP	Sales
Elva First Album	Released: November 17, 1999; Label: Virgin Records; Formats: CD, cassette, digital download, SACD	—	—	Asia: 1,500,000; TWN: 500,000
Red Rose	Released: August 15, 2000; Label: Virgin Records; Formats: CD, cassette, digital download	—	—	Asia: 1,500,000; TWN: 300,000
Tomorrow	Released: April 21, 2001; Label: Virgin Records; Formats: CD, cassette, digital download	—	—	TWN: 290,000; CHN: 400,000; HK: 55,000; MLY: 55,000; SGP: 55,000
Elva First	Released: October 23, 2001; Distributor: Toshiba EMI; Formats: CD, cassette, digital download	—	—	TWN: 120,000
4U	Released: February 11, 2002; Label: Virgin Records; Formats: CD, cassette, digital download	—	4	TWN: 150,000
Theme Song of Love, Kissing	Released: August 30, 2002; Label: Virgin Records; Formats: CD, cassette, digital download	—	6	TWN: 100,000
So Elva	Released: May 16, 2003; Label: Virgin Records; Formats: CD, cassette, digital download	—	4	TWN: 180,000
5th Avenue	Released: December 30, 2003; Label: Virgin Records; Formats: CD, cassette, digital download	—	5	TWN: 100,000
1087	Released: December 22, 2006; Label: Warner Music; Formats: CD, digital download	1	—	TWN: 200,000
3 Faced	Released: June 15, 2008; Label: Virgin Records; Formats: CD, digital download	2	—	
Diamond Candy	Released: October 9, 2009; Label: Gold Typhoon; Formats: CD, digital download	1	—	TWN: 72,000
Miss Elva	Released: September 24, 2010; Label: Gold Typhoon; Formats: CD, digital download	1	—	Asia: 500,000; TWN: 100,000
I'm Ready	Released: December 23, 2011; Label: Gold Typhoon; Formats: CD, digital download	1	—	
Shut Up and Kiss Me	Released: August 22, 2014; Release company: Sony Music; Formats: CD, digital download	1	—	
Naked Truth	Released: December 24, 2020; Label: Take One Music; Formats: Digital download	—	—	

== Compilation albums ==
Title	Album details	Peak chart positions		Sales
Title	Album details	TWN	SGP	Sales
Beautiful Episode	Released: July 16, 2004; Label: Virgin Records; Formats: CD, digital download	—	2	CHN: 400,000
Love Elva... Remix & More	Released: December 8, 2006; Label: Virgin Records; Formats: CD, digital download	10	—	
Super Girl Fearless	Released: December 21, 2012; Label: Gold Typhoon; Formats: CD, digital download	1	—	

== Live albums ==
Title	Album details
Elva Live in Concert in Hong Kong	Released: February 9, 2002; Label: Virgin Records; Formats: CD
2003 UP2U Taipei Concert	Released: July 25, 2003; Label: Virgin Records; Formats: CD

== Singles ==
=== 1990s and 2000s ===
Title	Year	Album
"The Most Familiar Stranger"	1999	Elva First Album
"Suddenly Thinking of You" (突然想起你)	1999	Elva First Album
"Cappuccino"	1999	Elva First Album
"My Exciting Solitary Life" (一個人的精彩)	2000	Red Rose
"Rose" (薔薇)	2000	Red Rose
"I Love You Lots" (我愛你那麼多)	2001	Tomorrow
"Next Romance" (下一次戀愛)	2001	Tomorrow
"Love You With Smile" (笑著愛你)	2002	4U
"Theme Song of Love"	2002	Theme Song of Love, Kissing
"U Make Me Wanna"	2002	Theme Song of Love, Kissing
"Walk Style" (進行式) (featuring Tiger Hu)	2003	So Elva
"Map of Happiness" (幸福的地图)	2003	5th Avenue
"Confession" (表白)	2006	1087
"Spokesgirl" (代言人)	2006	1087
"Honey Honey Honey"	2006	1087
"Impulse" (衝動)	2008	3 Faced Elva
"Similar to Love" (类似爱情)	2008	3 Faced Elva
"Our Loneliness" (我們的寂寞)	2008	3 Faced Elva
"Shining Love" (闪闪惹人爱)	2009	Diamond Candy
"Diamond Candy" (鑽石糖)	2009	Diamond Candy
"Beautiful Encounter"	2009	Diamond Candy

=== 2010s and 2020s ===
Title	Year	Peak chart positions	Album
Title	Year	CHN	Album
Wrong Man" (錯的人)	2010	—	Miss Elva
"Rhapsody" (狂想, 曲)	2010	—	Miss Elva
"Miss Genuine" (瀟灑小姐)"	2010	—	Miss Elva
"Let Love Fly" (讓愛飛起來)	2010	—	Miss Elva
"Love Yourself" (我愛我)	2011	—	I'm Ready
"Stubborn" (逞强)	2011	—	I'm Ready
"Heartbroken" (遗失的心跳)	2011	—	I'm Ready
"Super Girl" (愛無畏)	2012	—	Super Girl
"Shut Up and Kiss Me" (不解释亲吻)	2014	—	Shut Up and Kiss Me
"Romance Strikes" (浪漫来袭)	2014	—	Shut Up and Kiss Me
"Tomorrow's Secret"	2017	—	Non-album singles
"Wu Wu Wu" (舞舞舞)	2018	—	Non-album singles
"In a Heartbeat" (当你和心跳一起出现)	2019	15	Naked Truth
"Celebrate Everyday" (不如先庆祝能在一起)	2020	25	Naked Truth
"Naked Truth"	2020	100	Naked Truth
"Love is Blameless" (爱没有错)	2023	76	Non-album single
"—" denotes that chart did not exist, or was not released in that region.
