= Kenji Wu =

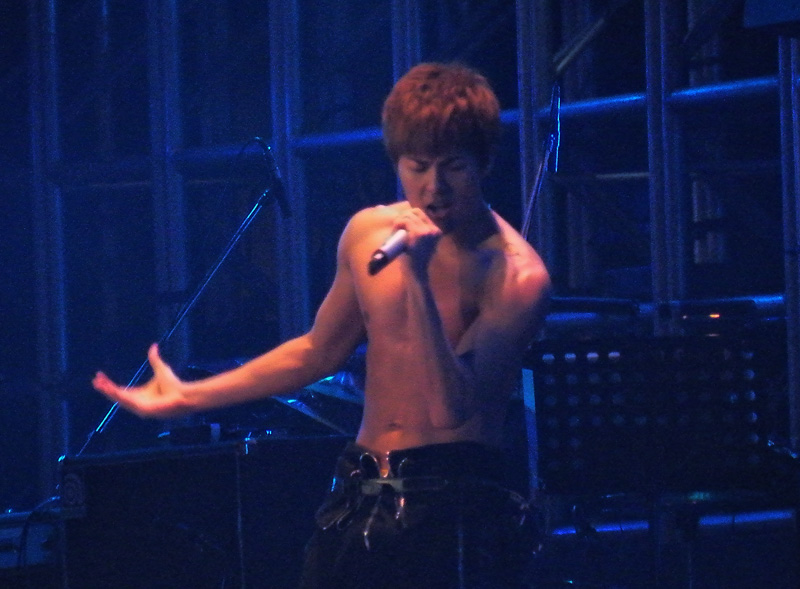
- Wu at Taipei New Year's Eve Party 2011
- Born: 18 October 1979 (age 46); Kaohsiung, Taiwan
- Education: National Taiwan University of Arts
- Occupations: Singer; songwriter; actor; television host; director
- Years active: 2000–present

Chinese name
- Traditional Chinese: 吳克群
- Simplified Chinese: 吴克群
Transcriptions
Standard Mandarin
- Hanyu Pinyin: Wú Kèqún
Southern Min
- Hokkien POJ: Ngô͘ Khek-kûn
- Musical career
- Also known as: Wu Kei-chun; Wu Kequn
- Genres: Mandopop
- Instruments: Guitar, piano
- Labels: Pourquoi Pas Music (2019–present); Warner Music Taiwan (2014–2017); Sony Music Taiwan (2013–2014); Seed Music (2004–2012); Virgin Records (2000)

Kenji Wu (traditional Chinese: 吳克群; simplified Chinese: 吴克群; pinyin: Wú Kèqún; Pe̍h-ōe-jī: Ngô͘ Khek-kûn; born 18 October 1979) is a Taiwanese singer, songwriter, actor and director.

== Early life ==
Wu was born on 18 October 1979 in Kaohsiung, Taiwan. When he was six, he moved to Argentina, but came back to Taiwan to compete in MTV Taiwan's "New Artist Fight Game".

He attended the National Taiwan University of Arts majoring in theater.

== Career ==
After competing in the "New Artist Fight Game" competition in 2000, he was subsequently signed to Virgin Music. Within half a year, Wu released his debut album Tomorrow, Alone (一個人的Tomorrow). Despite the involvement of top producers, the album received lukewarm response and weak sales. However, this gave him opportunities to act in Taiwanese drama such as Peach Girl and Moonlight Forest. During his time acting, he continued to perform songs he wrote and composed at pubs.

With an intense passion for music, Wu made a comeback to the music industry in November 2004 with a self-titled album, released by Seed Music. All ten songs in the album were written by him. Critics around Asia gave highly positive reviews. The hit song Wu Ke Qun cleverly incorporated the impersonations of well-known singers such as A-do, Leehom Wang, David Tao, Jay Chou, Fei Yu Ching, Emil Chau and Shin band. The song demonstrated Wu's determination to be a unique singer in his own right. In Hong Kong, it peaked at the 7th spot out of 20 in RTHK's Chinese chart for the week of 20–26 February 2005; however, the song did poorly in Singapore, debuting at 19th position on YES 933's chart for the week of 9–15 January 2005, and remained on the chart for only 2 weeks.

He returned in October 2005 with a new album titled The Kenji Show (大頑家 – 吳克群), also released by Seed Music. Working on a theme of having fun, the album comprises songs with his style of simple yet intriguing lyrics. Songs like "Da She Tou" (literally "Big Tongue") and "Bu Xie Ji Nian" rose to hit charts and were popular among students mostly. He has nominated for the best Chinese male singer in Taiwan at the 2006 and 2007 Golden Melody Awards, but the award went to Leehom Wang and Korean-born singer Nicky Lee, respectively.

In 2006, Wu released a new album entitled A General Order (將軍令) and again, all songs were written by Wu himself showing his creativity. This time he experimented with the Chinese music style, therefore the title song was written in that way. Other Chinese style songs including "Peaked You And Me" and "Champion" as well as the hit ballad "Cripple" are featured on this album. Wu will also be featured on a track on Hakka-Pac's album called Doing it Chikan Style. He also had a cameo appearance in Brown Sugar Macchiato.

In 2008, he release the album Poems For You (為你寫詩), in which he composed all the songs. This album was number one on the sales chart for 7 weeks. All of the five MVs that were released from this album were ranked in the top 10 in two of the largest KTV chains, thus breaking a record.

Aside from writing songs only for his own albums, he also composed and produced songs for other popular singers. He wrote "Ai Ku Gui" for Maggie Chiang, "Sha Gua" for Landy Wen, "Nan Ren Nu Ren" for Valen Hsu and A Mu Long, and "Da Ming Xing" for the superboys Yu Hao Ming and Wang Yue Xin.

In 2010, he released his eighth studio album Love Me, Hate Me (愛我 恨我) under Seed Music. The track "沒關係" (No Relations) is listed at number 24 on Hit Fm Taiwan's Hit Fm Annual Top 100 Singles Chart (Hit-Fm年度百首單曲) for 2010.

== Discography ==
1. A Lonely Tomorrow (一個人的Tomorrow) (2000)
2. First Creative Album (吳克群) (2004)
3. The Kenji Show (大頑家) (2005)
4. General's Command (將軍令) (2006)
5. Poems for You (為你寫詩) (2008)
6. Love Me, Hate Me (愛我 恨我) (2010)
7. Parasitism (寄生) (2010)
8. How To Deal With Loneliness? (寂寞來了怎麼辦？) (2012)
9. On The Way to the Stars (數星星的人) (2015)
10. Humorous Life (人生超幽默) (2017)
11. I Am Listening (你說 我聽著呢) (2020)

=== Selected compositions ===
- 2007 – "瘋了瘋了" (Going Mad) for Genie Chuo in Oxygenie of Happiness
- 2008 – "女生" (Girl) for Hey Girl in Hey Girl Self-Title Albunm
- 2010 – "錯的人" (Wrong Person) for Elva Hsiao in Miss Elva

== Filmography ==
=== Television series ===
Year	English title	Original title	Role	Notes
2001	Peach Girl	蜜桃女孩	Kazuya Tojigamori	
2001	Sunshine Jelly	陽光果凍		
2002	Moonlight Forest	月光森林	Chang Ching	
2003	The Rose	薔薇之戀	Mao Ji's friend	Cameo
2005	The Doctor	大熊醫師家	Himself	Cameo
2007	Brown Sugar Macchiato	黑糖瑪奇朵	Himself	Cameo
2011	Love Recipe	料理情人夢	Fu Yong-le	
2015	Heart of Steel	鋼鐵之心	Jimmy	Cameo
2016	Golden Darling	原來1家人	David	Cameo
2018	Age of Rebellion	翻牆的記憶	Himself	Cameo
2019	The Legends of Monkey King	大潑猴	Tianpeng	

=== Film ===
Year	English title	Original title	Role	Notes/Ref.
2003	Rain Coat	雨衣 / 7–11之戀	Chih	Also known as Love at 7–11
2008	The Fatality	絕魂印	Ho Shih-jung / Asanee	
2012	Million People	萬人•迷	Kevin	Short film
2014	The Old Cinderella	脫軌時代	Kang Shao	
2016	70 80 90	708090之深圳戀歌	Liu Mingzhe	
2017	Hanky Panky	大釣哥	Chang Shih-pang	
2018	Crazy Little Thing	為你寫詩	Chen Shijie	Also as director

=== Variety and reality show ===
Year	English title	Original title	Notes
2008	Unbeatable Youth	無敵青春克	Host
2013	Celebrity Battle	全能星戰	Participant
2022	Call Me by Fire (season 2)	披荊斬棘	Participant

=== Music videos ===
==== As director ====
Year	Song title	Artist
2006	"The Genius of Drama 戲劇天才"	Himself
2008	"Hold My Hand 牽牽牽手"	Himself
2008	"Love Hurts 愛太痛"	Himself
2009	"Closer Hearts 把心拉近"	Himself

==== Appearances ====
Song title	Artist
"Legend 神話"	Valen Hsu
"Meet Another Person 遇見另外一個人"	Valen Hsu
"In a Wink 轉眼"	Penny Tai
"On What Grounds 憑什麼"	Qu Ying
"What Time Is It There? 你那裡幾點"	Ginny Liu
"In Your Heart 留在誰心裡"	Maggie Chiang
"Missing You, Again 我又想起你"	Maggie Chiang
"Gentleness of Both Hands 雙手的溫柔"	Maggie Chiang
"Must Meet Again 要再見"	Cindy Chen
"Only If You Can Remember Me 只要你想起我"	Cindy Chen

== Awards and nominations ==
Year	Award	Category	Nominated work	Result
2006	17th Golden Melody Awards	Best Mandarin Male Singer	The Kenji Show	Nominated
2007	HITO Radio Music Awards	Most Popular Singer-songwriter (popular vote)	—N/a	Won
2007	Singapore Hit Awards 2007	Most Popular Male Artist	—N/a	Nominated
2007	18th Golden Melody Awards	Best Composer	"A General Order"	Nominated
2007	18th Golden Melody Awards	Best Mandarin Male Singer	A General Order	Nominated
2015	2015 MTV Europe Music Awards	Best Taiwanese Act	—N/a	Nominated
2016	The 4th V Chart Awards	Best Singer-songwriter of the Year	—N/a	Won
