= 1986 (disambiguation) =

1986 was a common year starting on Wednesday of the Gregorian calendar.

1986 may also refer to:

- 1986 (EP), a 2007 EP by Kavinsky
- 1986 (album), an album by Genie Chuo
- 1986 (American TV series), an American news magazine series
- 1986 (Portuguese TV series)
