= Oxygenie of Happiness =

- Oxygenie of Happiness cover

Studio album 幸福氧氣 by Genie Chuo
- Released: 26 October 2007
- Genre: Mandopop
- Language: Mandarin
- Label: Rock Records

Genie Chuo chronology
Be Used To (2006)	Oxygenie of Happiness (2007)	My Favorite Kind of Geniie (2008)

Alternative cover

Oxygenie of Happiness (Chinese: 幸福氧氣; pinyin: Xing Fu Yang Qi) is Taiwanese Mandopop artist Genie Chuo's (Chinese: 卓文萱) third Mandarin studio album. It was released by Rock Records on 26 October 2007. It was available for preorder which includes a photo notebook. A further edition was released on 14 December 2007, Oxygenie of Happiness (Sweet Taste Edition) (幸福氧氣 香甜限定盤), with a bonus DVD.

The album features one of the insert songs, "瘋了瘋了" (Going Mad), of Taiwanese drama Rolling Love, starring Chuo, Jiro Wang, Danson Tang and Xiao Xun, which is composed by Taiwanese singer-songwriter Kenji Wu.

== Track listing ==
1. "幸福氧氣" Xing Fu Yang Qi (Oxygenie of Happiness)
2. "手心" Shou Xin (Hand Heart)
3. "小脾氣" Xiao Pi Qi (Short Tempered)
4. "最後，鹽對胡椒說…" Zui Hou Yan Dui Hu Jiao Shuo (Lastly, Salt Said to Pepper)
5. "瘋了瘋了" Feng Le Feng Le (Going Mad) – insert song for Rolling Love – composed by Kenji Wu
6. "自從遇見你" Zi Cong Yu Jian Ni (Since Meeting You)
7. "讀心術" Du Xin Shu (Heartology)
8. "忍心" Ren Xin (Hardhearted)
9. "被你愛過我很快樂" Bei Ni Ai Guo Wo Hen Kuai Le (Happy to Have Been Loved by You)
10. "甜甜圈" Tian Tian Quan (Sweet Circle)

== Releases ==
Three editions of the album were released by Rock Records:

- 26 October 2007 – Oxygenie of Happiness (Notebook Preorder Edition) (幸福氧氣 寫真筆記書預購版) – includes a photo notebook.
- 26 October 2007 – Oxygenie of Happiness (Regular Edition) (幸福氧氣)
- 14 December 2007 – Oxygenie of Happiness (Sweet Taste Edition) (幸福氧氣 香甜限定盤) (CD+DVD) – with a DVD containing four music videos and behind-the-scene footage.
1. "幸福氧氣" (Oxygenie of Happiness) MV
2. "手心" (Hand Heart) MV
3. "小脾氣" (Short Tempered) MV
4. "被你愛過我很快樂" (Happy to Have Been Loved by You) MV
5. Oxygenie of Happiness behind-the-scene + Jeju Island Travelog
