= Towards Tomorrow's Journey =

- Towards Tomorrow's Journey (Guardian Edition) cover

Greatest hits album 開往明天的旅行 by Danson Tang
- Released: 26 April 2011
- Genre: Mandopop
- Language: Mandarin
- Label: Avex Taiwan

Danson Tang chronology
The First Second (2010)	Towards Tomorrow's Journey (2011)

Alternative cover

Towards Tomorrow's Journey (New songs + Collection) (Chinese: 開往明天的旅行) is Taiwanese Mandopop artist Danson Tang's (Chinese: 唐禹哲) first greatest hits album. Two editions of the album were released on 26 April 2011 by Avex Taiwan: Towards Tomorrow's Journey (Guardian Edition) (守護盤) and Towards Tomorrow's Journey (Journey Edition) (啟程盤). Both editions contains 15 previously released tracks, three new songs, a 52-page lyrics and photo book, a bonus DVD with 13 music videos and three Danson Tang music specials.

The first lead track is "開往明天的旅行" (Towards Tomorrow's Journey), it peaked at number one at week 37, on 25 June 2011, on TVB8 Gold Song Chart, run by Hong Kong television station TVB8.

== Track listing ==
- **New tracks in bold**
1. **"對眼" (Opposite Eyes)**
2. **"開往明天的旅行" (Towards Tomorrow's Journey)**
3. **"觸電" (Electric Shock)**
4. "最愛還是你" (Still Love You the Most) - The X-Family ep 1 to 30 ending theme
5. "情報" (Intelligence)
6. "造飛機" (Airplane)
7. "新歌" (New Song)
8. "Kiss Me Now"
9. "I’m Back" (Rap feat Amber of F(x))
10. "分開以後" (After The Breakup)
11. "愛我" (Love Me)
12. "灰色河堤" (Grey Riverbank)
13. "最溫柔的懸念" (Most Gentle Suspense)
14. "Be With You"
15. "放過你自己吧" (Forgive Yourself)
16. "The Best Of DT" medley

== Bonus DVD ==
- **New tracks in bold**
1. **"開往明天的旅行" (Towards Tomorrow's Journey) MV**
2. "愛我" (Love Me) MV
3. "分開以後" (After The Breakup) MV
4. "回馬槍" (The Gun) MV
5. "造飛機" (Airplane) MV
6. "情報" (Intelligence) MV
7. "新歌" (New Song) MV
8. "最溫柔的懸念" (Let Go of Yourself) MV
9. "Kiss Me Now" MV
10. "灰色河堤" (Grey Riverbank) MV
11. "放過你自己吧" (Let Go of Yourself) MV
12. "Be With You" MV
13. Love Me Music Special (愛我 音樂特輯)
14. D's New Attraction Music Special (D新引力 音樂特輯)
15. The First Second Music Special (D一秒 音樂特輯)
