= 1+1 Play 'n' Fun =

- 1+1 Play 'n' Fun cover

Compilation album by Genie Chuo
- Released: 6 November 2009
- Genre: Mandopop
- Language: Mandarin
- Label: Rock Records

Genie Chuo chronology
My Favorite Kind of Geniie (2008)	1+1 Play 'n' Fun (2009)

1+1 Play 'n' Fun is Taiwanese Mandopop artist Genie Chuo's first compilation album and fifth album release. It was released by Rock Records on 6 November 2009. It contains six new tracks and 17 previously released songs.

The track, "1+1" won one of the Songs of the Year at the 2010 Metro Radio Mandarin Music Awards presented by Hong Kong radio station Metro Info.

== Track listing ==
CD 1 – new tracks in bold

1. **"真相大白" Zhen Xiang Da Bai (The Truth Revealed)**
2. **"一秒也好" Yi Miao Ye Hao (If Only For a Second)**
3. **"在你身邊" Zai Ni Shen Bian (By Your Side)**
4. "香草戀人" Xiang Cao Lian Ren (Vanilla Lovers)
5. "怎麼知道你愛我" Zen Me Zhi Dao Ni Ai Wo (How Do I Tell You Love Me)
6. "愛情魔法衣" Ai Qing Mo Fa Yi (Love's Magic Coat) – Rolling Love insert song
7. "永不消失的彩虹" Yong Bu Xiao Shi De Cai Hong (Never-Disappearing Rainbow) – Rolling Love ending theme
8. "Super No. 1" – Love Queen opening theme
9. "幸福氧氣" Xing Fu Yang Qi (Breath of Happiness)
10. "梁山伯與茱麗葉" Liang Shan Bo Yu Zhu Li Yei (Liang Shan-Bo and Julliet) – feat Gary Chaw – Love Queen ending theme

CD 2 – new tracks in bold

1. **"1+1"**
2. **"忘了我是誰" Wang Le Wo Shi Shei (Forgetting Who I Am)** – feat Victor Wong
3. **"Especially For You"** – feat Leon Williams
4. "想家" Xiang Jia (Homesick)
5. "愛的城堡" Ai De Cheng Bao (Love Castle)
6. "幸福的調味" Xing Fu De Tiao Wei (Spice of Happiness)
7. "手心" Shou Xin (Palm)
8. "冬天的桔子" Dong Tian De Ju Zi (Winter Tangerines)
9. "愛我好嗎" Ai Wo Hao Ma (Please Love Me)
10. "一句話" Yi Ju Hua (A Promise)
11. "甜甜圈" Tian Tian Quan (Doughnut)
12. "獨家快樂" Du Jia Kuai Le (Unique Happiness)
13. "愛的主旋律" Ai De Zhu Xuan Lü (Love Theme) – feat Alien Huang
