= Shut Up and Kiss Me =

Shut Up and Kiss Me may refer to:

- Shut Up and Kiss Me (film), a 2004 film

== Music ==
- Shut Up and Kiss Me (Michelle Wright album), 2002
- Shut Up and Kiss Me (Elva Hsiao album), 2014

=== Songs ===
- "Shut Up and Kiss Me" (Mary Chapin Carpenter song), 1994
- "Shut Up and Kiss Me" (Orianthi song), 2010
- "Shut Up & Kiss Me" (Reece Mastin song), 2012
- "Shut Up & Kiss Me", by Echosmith, from the album Lonely Generation, 2020
- "Shut Up & Kiss Me", by Whitesnake, from the album Flesh & Blood, 2019

== See also ==
- Kiss Me (disambiguation)
- Shut up (disambiguation)
- "Shut Up Kiss Me", by Angel Olsen, from the album My Woman, 2016
