= MTV Europe Music Award for Best Taiwanese Act =

Category of MTV Europe Music Awards

The following is a list of the MTV Europe Music Award winners and nominees for Best Taiwanese Act.

== 2010s ==
Year	Winner	Nominees
2013	Show Lo	Jam Hsiao; JJ Lin; Rainie Yang; Vanness Wu
2014	Hebe Tien	A-mei; Mayday; Sodagreen; Will Pan
2015	Jay Chou	JJ Lin; Jolin Tsai; Kenji Wu; Leehom Wang
