= Love Recipe =

- Also known as: 料理情人夢
- Genre: Romance, Comedy
- Directed by: Huang Keyi
- Starring: Kenji Wu; Li Jiaying; Emma Wu(Gui Gui); Rhydian Vaughan
- Opening theme: 愛的秘方 – Kenji Wu
- Ending theme: 一半一半 – Kenji Wu
- Composer: Kenji Wu
- Country of origin: Taiwan
- Original language: Mandarin
- No. of series: 1
- No. of episodes: 10

Production
- Production location: Taiwan
- Running time: 60 mins

Original release
- Network: CTV
- Release: 4 September – 6 November 2011

Love Recipe (Chinese: 料理情人夢) is a 2011 Taiwanese romance drama written by Lu Huixin, Yang Huiwen and directed by Huang Keyi (黃克義). It stars Kenji Wu, Li Jiaying, Emma Wu (Gui Gui) and Rhydian Vaughan as the main characters in the drama.

== Synopsis ==
Fu Yongle (Kenji Wu) is a handsome and easygoing young man. He has a great talent for cooking food and he had a happy childhood. However, his parents died and he was adopted by his father's best friend. Fu Yongle does not give up his cheerful character because of the misfortune. He tries to restore his father's canteen, and along the way he encounters a lot of surprises, including his true love.

== Cast ==
Actor	Character
Emma Wu(Gui Gui)（吳映潔）	Wang Meiya （王美亞）
Kenji Wu	Fu Yongle (傅永樂)
Li Jiaying (李佳穎)	Li Anan （黎安安）
Rhydian Vaughan（鳳小岳）	He Xia (何夏)

== Music ==
=== Theme Song ===
- 愛的秘方 – Kenji Wu (Opening)
- 一半一半 – Kenji Wu (Ending)

== Reception ==
China Television ratings
Original broadcast date	Episode number	Average	Timeslot rank	Section peak (every 15 mins)	Notes
4 September 2011	1	0.87	2		
11 September 2011	2	0.67	3		
18 September 2011	3	0.51	3		
25 September 2011	4	0.52	3		
2 October 2011	5	0.42	4		
9 October 2011	6	0.30	4		
16 October 2011	7	0.24	4		
23 October 2011	8	0.29	4		
30 October 2011	9	0.18	4		
6 November 2011	10	0.24	4		
Average		0.41			
