= Red Rose (album) =

- Standard edition album cover

Studio album by Elva Hsiao
- Released: August 15, 2000
- Recorded: 2000
- Studio: Take One Music
- Genre: Pop
- Length: 46:25
- Language: Chinese
- Label: Virgin
- Producer: Chen Wei; Azlan Abu Hassan; Jae Y. Chong; Hari 'Haze' Krish Menon; Chris Babida; Jit W. Lim

Elva Hsiao chronology
Elva First Album (1999)	Red Rose (2000)	Tomorrow (2001)

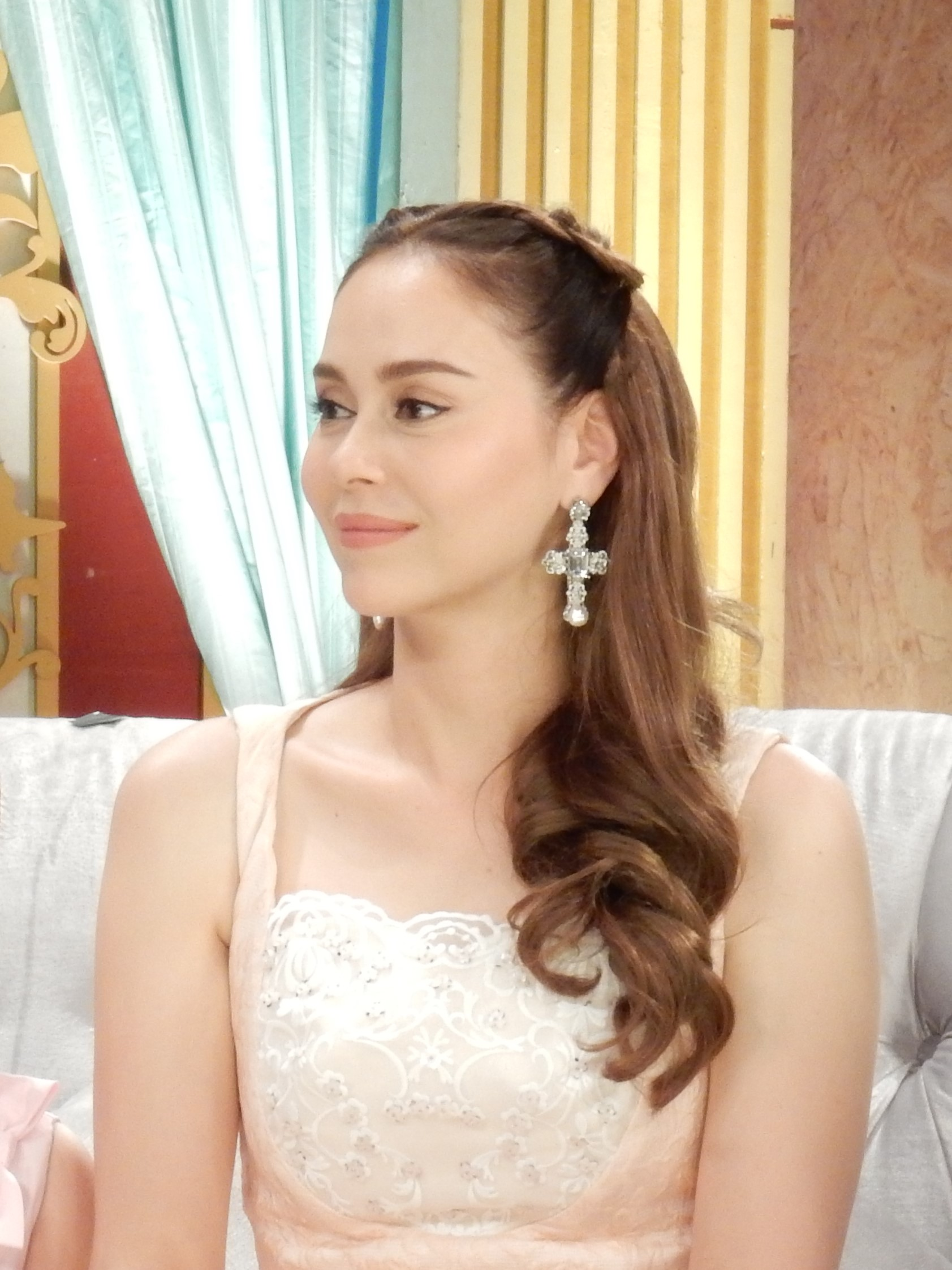
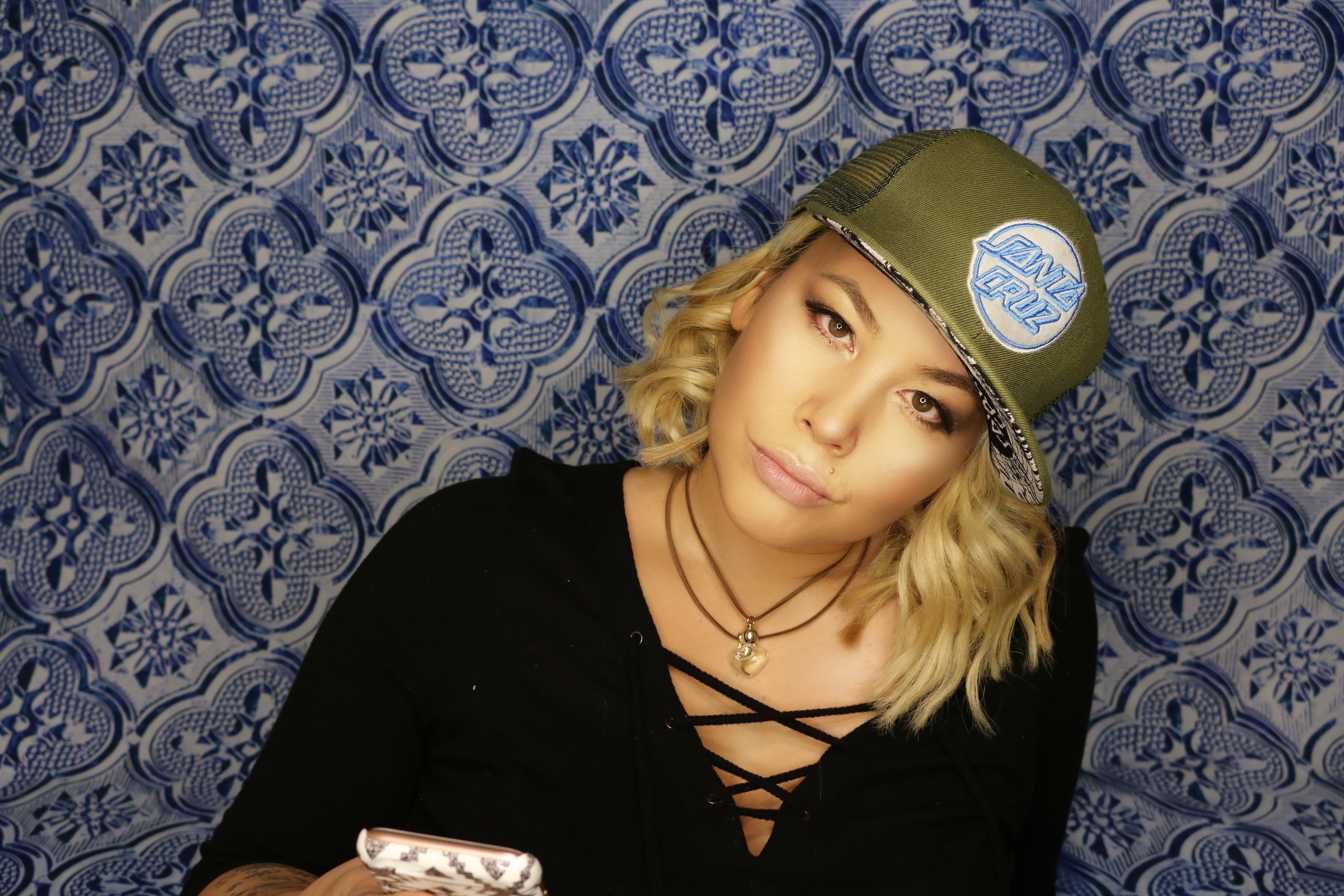
"My Exciting Solitary Life" (cover contains Nat Myria ("Rak Gan Choie Loie") from 1999 album: Freshy Myria) (left), "Blossom In Red" was written by Sakura (right)

Red Rose (simplified Chinese: 红蔷薇; traditional Chinese: 紅薔薇) is the second studio album by Taiwanese singer Elva Hsiao, released on August 15, 2000, by Virgin Records Taiwan. The songs, "My Exciting Solitary Life" and "Rose", reached number fifteen and forty-three respectively on Hit FM Annual Top 100 Singles in 2000.

== Track listing ==
Red Rose – Standard edition
No.	Title	Writer(s)	Producer(s)	Length
1.	"Rainy Season" (雨季中)	Chien Yao; Chen Wei	Chen Wei	4:10
2.	"My Exciting Solitary Life" (一個人的精彩)	Chang Yu; Voravit Pikul Thong	Azlan Abu Hassan	3:11
3.	"Weather Outside the Window" (窗外的天氣)	Chien Yao; Sky Wu	Jae Y. Chong	4:32
4.	"Ready" (準備好了沒有)	Chang Yu; Wang, Yi-long; Hari 'Haze' Krish Menon	Hari 'Haze' Krish Menon	3:54
5.	"Locked" (上鉤了)	Adam Hsu; Jae Y. Chong	Jae Y. Chong	4:03
6.	"Night" (夜)	Chien Yao; Chris Babida	Chris Babida	3:32
7.	"Rose" (薔薇)	Chien Yao; Sakura	Chen Wei	5:25
8.	"Movie Preview" (電影預告)	Chow Yiu-fai; Azlan	Azlan Abu Hassan	3:16
9.	"Give Me a New Love's Chance" (給我重新愛你的機會)	Luo, Fang-you	Hari 'Haze' Krish Menon	4:30
10.	"Ask Yourself First" (先問你自己)	Julian Yu; Keith Robertson	Chen Wai	4:08
11.	"Memory Letter" (回憶信箋)	Chang Yu; Jit W. Lim	Jit W. Lim	5:44
Total length:				46:25
