= My Favorite Kind of Geniie =

- My Favorite Kind of Geniie (Sexy Edition) cover

Studio album 超級喜歡 by Genie Chuo
- Released: 7 November 2008
- Genre: Mandopop
- Language: Mandarin
- Label: Rock Records

Genie Chuo chronology
Oxygenie of Happiness (2007)	My Favorite Kind of Geniie (2008)	1 + 1 Play n Fun (2009)

Alternative cover

My Favorite Kind of Geniie (Chinese: 超級喜歡) is Taiwanese Mandopop artist Genie Chuo's (Chinese: 卓文萱) fourth Mandarin studio album. It was released by Rock Records on 7 November 2008 with two album cover versions: My Favorite Kind of Geniie (Sexy Edition) (超級喜歡 [初] 輕熟性感盤) and My Favorite Kind of Geniie (Sweet Edition) (超級喜歡 [漾] 可口甜心盤) both with the same bonus DVD. Two more editions were released: My Favorite Kind of Geniie (Collectable Edition) (超級喜歡 獨家快樂珍藏盤) on 23 December 2008 and My Favorite Kind of Geniie (New Year Edition) (超級喜歡 新春感謝回饋盤) on 20 January 2009, both with different bonus DVD.

== Track listing ==
1. "愛的城堡" Ai De Cheng Bao (Love Castle)
2. "一句話" Yi Ju Hua (A Promise)
3. "超級喜歡" Chao Ji Xi Huan (My Favorite Kind of Geniie)
4. "獨家快樂" Du Jia Kuai Le (Exclusive Happiness)
5. "Save Me"
6. "下個幸福" Xia Ge Xing Fu (Next Love)
7. "自己找答案" Zi Ji Zhao Da An (I Found The Answer)
8. "不說" Bu Shuo (Be Quiet)
9. "一個人勇敢" Yi Ge Ren Yong Gan (Brave Myself)
10. "靜電" Jing Dian (Static)

== Releases ==
Four editions were released by Rock Records:

- 7 November 2008 - My Favorite Kind of Geniie (Sexy Edition) (超級喜歡 [初] 輕熟性感盤) with a bonus DVD:
1. "愛的城堡" (Love Castle) MV
2. "一句話" (A Promise) MV
3. "愛的城堡" (Love Castle) dance training footage
4. Genie dance steps secrets
5. Genie dance steps behind-the-scene
- 7 November 2008 - My Favorite Kind of Geniie (Sweet Edition) (超級喜歡 [漾] 可口甜心盤) with the same bonus DVD as listed at the sexy edition.
- 23 December 2008 - My Favorite Kind of Geniie (Collectable Edition) (超級喜歡 獨家快樂珍藏盤) with a bonus DVD containing the music video of "獨家快樂" (Exclusive Happiness) and a 46 minutes My Favorite Kind of Geniie television special.
- 20 January 2009 - My Favorite Kind of Geniie (New Year Edition) (超級喜歡 新春感謝回饋盤) with a bonus DVD containing four music videos and concert footage:
1. "愛的城堡" (Love Castle) MV
2. "一句話" (A Promise) MV
3. "獨家快樂" (Exclusive Happiness) MV
4. "超級喜歡" (My Favorite Kind of Geniie) MV
5. 2008 Jeju Island, Korea music special
6. Love Castle Love Music concert live highlight footage
