= Elva Hsiao (album) =

Elva First Album
- Standard edition album cover

Studio album by Elva Hsiao
- Released: November 17, 1999
- Recorded: 1999
- Studio: Take One Music
- Genre: Pop
- Length: 41:04
- Language: Chinese
- Label: Virgin
- Producer: Chen Wei; Jae Y. Chong; Azlan Abu Hassan

Elva Hsiao chronology
Elva First Album (1999)	Red Rose (2000)

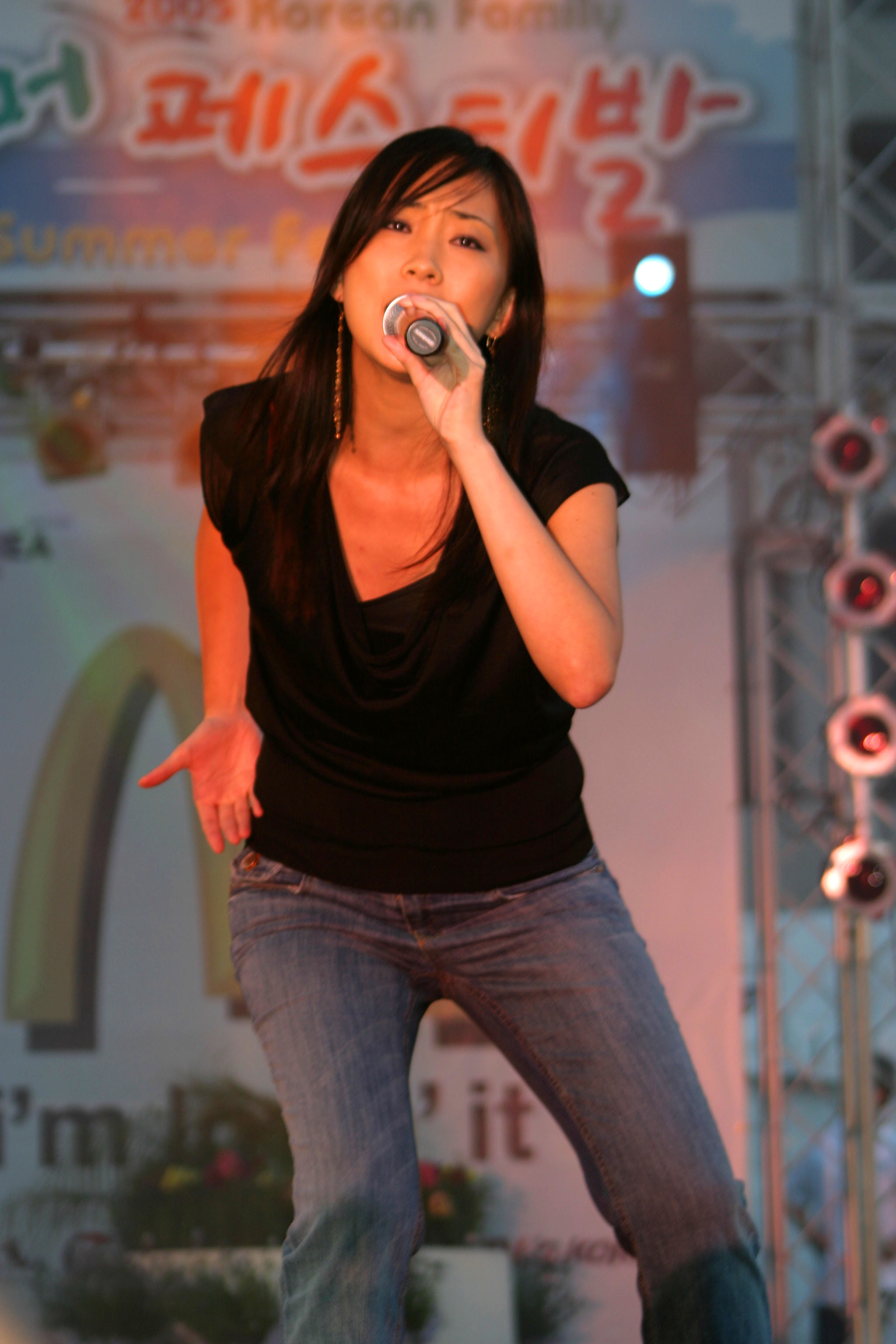
"Cappuccino" (cover contains J.ae - 너의 향기 ("The Very Scent of You") from 1998 album: J-Gold / J-Blue)

Elva First Album (simplified Chinese: 萧亚轩同名专辑; traditional Chinese: 蕭亞軒同名專輯) is the debut album by Taiwanese singer Elva Hsiao, released on November 17, 1999, by Virgin Records Taiwan.

== Track listing ==
Elva First Album – Standard edition
No.	Title	Writer(s)	Producer(s)	Length
1.	"Nobody" (沒有人)	Chien Yao; Chen Wei	Chen Wei	4:31
2.	"Cappuccino"	Chien Yao; Jae Y. Chong	Jae Y. Chong	3:37
3.	"Suddenly Thinking of You" (突然想起你)	Lin Xi; Chen Wei	Chen Wei	3:51
4.	"Born to Choose"	Francis Lee; Johnny Jam & Delgado	Azlan Abu Hassan	3:36
5.	"Love Is a Bad Thing" (愛是個壞東西)	Hsieh Ming-hsun; Mike Michaels; Mark Tabak; MM Dollar; Flow	Jae Y. Chong	5:12
6.	"The Most Familiar Stranger" (最熟悉的陌生人)	Chien Yao; Xiao Ke; Azlan Abu Hassan	Azlan Abu Hassan	4:19
7.	"Dump It Dump It" (甩拉甩拉)	Mark; Azlan Abu Hassan; Hawa Junaidi; Latifah Y.	Azlan Abu Hassan	3:47
8.	"You Come, You Go" (你來你走)	Li Xiu-zhen; Martine McCutcheon; Jason Hazeley; Ben Parker; Azlan Abu Hassan	Azlan Abu Hassan	4:23
9.	"Love Myself More" (多愛自己一下)	Bau Bi; Alejandro Jo Pigueras Ramirez; Fermado Rodriguez Fernandez; Lydia Rodriguez Fernandez; Jeremy Lee	Chen Wei	4:11
10.	"What's Next"	Chow Yiu-fai; Detlef Petersen; Barry Alfonso; Rainey Haynes; Jeremy Lee	Chen Wai	3:37
Total length:				41:04
