= Where's the Dragon? =

2015 Chinese-Hong Kong animated film by Foo Sing-Choong

- Film poster
- 龙在哪里?
- Directed by: Foo Sing-Choong, Betty Tang
- Starring: Zhang Ziyi; Wang Leehom; Michael Wong; Maggie Chiang; Fish Leong; Leon Dai
- Production companies: Beijing Dedao Education Investment; Beijing Duobaoshu Entertainment; Hongkong Longzai Nali; Caihong Engineering
- Distributed by: 北京星美影视发行有限公司
- Release date: October 23, 2015 (China)
- Running time: 97 minutes
- Countries: China; Hong Kong
- Language: Mandarin
- Box office: CN¥3.3 million (China)

Where's the Dragon? (Chinese: 龙在哪里?) is a 2015 3D animated comedy film directed by Foo Sing-Choong, co-directed by Betty Tang. A China-Hong Kong co-production, the film was released in China on October 23, 2015.

== Voice cast ==
- Zhang Ziyi
- Wang Leehom
- Michael Wong
- Maggie Chiang
- Fish Leong
- Leon Dai

== Reception ==
The film has earned CN¥3.304 million at the Chinese box office.
