= Midnight Microblog =

- Starring: Danson Tang
- Release date: March 1, 2013 (China)
- Running time: 90 minutes
- Country: China
- Language: Mandarin

Midnight Microblog (Chinese: 午夜微博) is a 2013 Chinese horror film.

== Cast ==
- Danson Tang
