= Be Used To =

- Be Used To cover

Studio album 習慣 by Genie Chuo
- Released: 27 October 2006
- Genre: Mandopop
- Language: Mandarin
- Label: Rock Records

Genie Chuo chronology
1986 (2001)	Be Used To (2006)	Oxygenie of Happiness (2007)

Alternative cover

Be Used To (Chinese: 習慣) is Taiwanese Mandopop artist Genie Chuo's (Chinese: 卓文萱) second Mandarin studio album. It was released by Rock Records on 27 October 2006 Two more editions were released: Be Used To (Celebration Edition) (習慣 慶功/感謝超值版), on 8 December 2006, with an AVCD containing three music videos and two remix tracks and Be Used To (Thank You Edition) (習慣 真心感謝超值版), on 15 February 2007 with a bonus VCD containing five music videos and five karaoke tracks.

The album features the opening and ending theme songs for Taiwanese drama Love Queen, "Super No. 1" and "梁山伯與茱麗葉" (Liang Shan Bo Yu Zhu Li Ye), which features Malaysian Mandopop artist Gary Chaw. The tracks "長衣袖" (Chang Yi Xiu) and "幸福調味" (Xing Fu Tiao Wei) were composed by Taiwanese singer-songwriter David Tao.

== Track listing ==
1. "Super No. 1" (Love Queen opening theme) - 3:39
2. "對你的愛" Dui Ni De Ai (The Love For You) -4:06
3. "梁山伯與茱麗葉" Liang Shan Bo Yu Zhu Li Ye (Liang Shan Bo and Juliet) feat Gary Chaw (Love Queen ending theme) - 3:53
4. "冬天的桔子" Dong Tian De Ju Zi (Winter Orange) - 4:14
5. "長衣袖" Chang Yi Xiuv (Long Sleeves)- (3:42
6. "幸福調味" Xing Fu Tiao Wei (Taste of Happiness) - 3:57
7. "可以不可以" Ke Yi Bu Ke Yi (Can Cannot)- 4:39
8. "小空間大愛戀" Xiao Kong Jian Da Lian Ai (Small Space Big Love) - 3:47
9. "烏魯木齊小女人" Wu Lu Mu Qi Xiao Nu Ren (Ürümqi Woman) - 3:58
10. "愛我好嗎?" Ai Wo Hao Ma (Love Me?)- 4:25

== Releases ==
Three editions of the album were released by Rock Records:

- 27 October 2006 - Be Used To (習慣)
- 8 December 2006 - Be Used To (Celebration Edition) (習慣 慶功/感謝超值版), on 8 December 2006, with an AVCD containing three music videos and two remix tracks:
1. "梁山伯與茱麗葉" (Liang Shan Bo and Juliet) MV
2. "幸福調味" (Taste of Happiness) MV
3. "對你的愛" (The Love For You) MV
4. Behind-the-scene footage
5. "梁山伯與茱麗葉" (Liang Shan Bo and Juliet) Remix
6. "冬天的桔子" (Winter Orange) Remix
- 15 February 2007 - Be Used To (Thank You Edition) (習慣 真心感謝超值版) with a bonus VCD containing five music videos and five karaoke tracks.
1. "梁山伯與茱麗葉" (Liang Shan Bo and Juliet) MV
2. "對你的愛" (The Love For You) MV
3. "幸福調味" (Taste of Happiness) MV
4. "Super No 1" MV
5. "冬天的桔子" (Winter Orange) MV
6. "梁山伯與茱麗葉" (Liang Shan Bo and Juliet) karaoke version
7. "對你的愛" (The Love For You) karaoke version
8. "幸福調味" (Taste of Happiness) karaoke version
9. "Super No 1" karaoke version
10. "冬天的桔子" (Winter Orange) karaoke version
