= The First Second =

- The First Second (Dance Edition) cover

Studio album D1秒 by Danson Tang
- Released: 24 June 2010
- Genre: Mandopop
- Length: 39:07
- Language: Mandarin
- Label: Avex Taiwan

Danson Tang chronology
D's New Attraction (2009)	The First Second (2010)	Towards Tomorrow's Journey (2011)

Alternative cover

The First Second (Chinese: D1秒; pinyin: D Yī Miǎo) is the Taiwanese Mandopop artist Danson Tang's (Chinese: 唐禹哲) third Mandarin studio album. Two versions of the album were released on 24 June 2010 by Avex Taiwan: The First Second (Dance Edition) and The First Second (Touch Edition), they include a bonus DVD and a photo book respectively. Two more editions were released: The First Second (MV Edition) and The First Second (Summer Cool Edition), both on 23 July 2010, they include a bonus DVD and postcards respectively.

The first lead track, "I'm Back", a high-tempo dance track, features English and Korean rap by Amber of the Korean girl band f(x), who also starred in the music video. The track "灰色河堤" (Grey Riverbank) is listed at number 97 on Hit Fm Taiwan's Hit Fm Annual Top 100 Singles Chart (Hit-Fm年度百首單曲) for 2010.

== Track listing ==
1. "I'm Back" (rap feat. Amber) - 3:32
2. "灰色河堤" huī sè hé dī (Grey Riverbank) - 3:40
3. "陪你" péi nǐ (Accompany You) - 4:09
4. "放過你自己吧" fàng guo nǐ zì jǐ ba (Let Go of Yourself) - 4:01
5. "Be With You" - 4:19
6. "不成文規定" bù chéng wén guī dìng (Not Yet Written) - 3:23
7. "你那首歌" nǐ nà shǒu gē (Your Song) - 4:33
8. "You Are The One" - 4:36
9. "淚偶" lèi ǒu (Rain Tears) - 4:41
10. "開心對不對" kāi xīn duì bù duì (Happy, Right) - 2:55

== Music videos ==
- "I'm Back" (rap feat Amber) MV
- "灰色河堤" (Grey Canel) MV
- "Be With You" MV
- "放過你自己吧" (Let Go of Yourself) MV
- "陪你" (Accompany You) - feature clips from autograph singing events

== Releases ==
Four editions were released by Avex Taiwan:

- 24 June 2010 - The First Second (Dance Edition) (D1秒 Dance舞動個性版) (CD+DVD) - includes DVD with "I'm Back" music video and making of
- 24 June 2010 - The First Second (Touch Edition) (D1秒 Touch型男魅力版) (CD+DVD) - includes a Danson photobook
- 23 July 2010 - The First Second (MV Edition) (D1秒 燃燒熱力影音版) (CD+DVD) - includes DVD with 3 music videos and making of:
1. "I'm Back" (rap feat Amber) MV and making of
2. "灰色河堤" (Grey Canel) MV and making of
3. "放過你自己吧" (Let Go of Yourself) MV and making of
- 23 July 2010 - The First Second (Summer Cool Edition) (D1秒 陪你消暑酷愛版) (CD+MV DVD) - includes a set of 4 postcards and a mini-poster
