= Tomorrow (Elva Hsiao album) =

- Standard edition album cover

Studio album by Elva Hsiao
- Released: April 21, 2001
- Studio: Take One Music
- Genre: Pop
- Length: 41:25
- Language: Chinese
- Label: Virgin
- Producers: Chen Wei; Jae Chong; Jim Lee

Elva Hsiao chronology
Red Rose (2000)	Tomorrow (2001)	4U (2002)

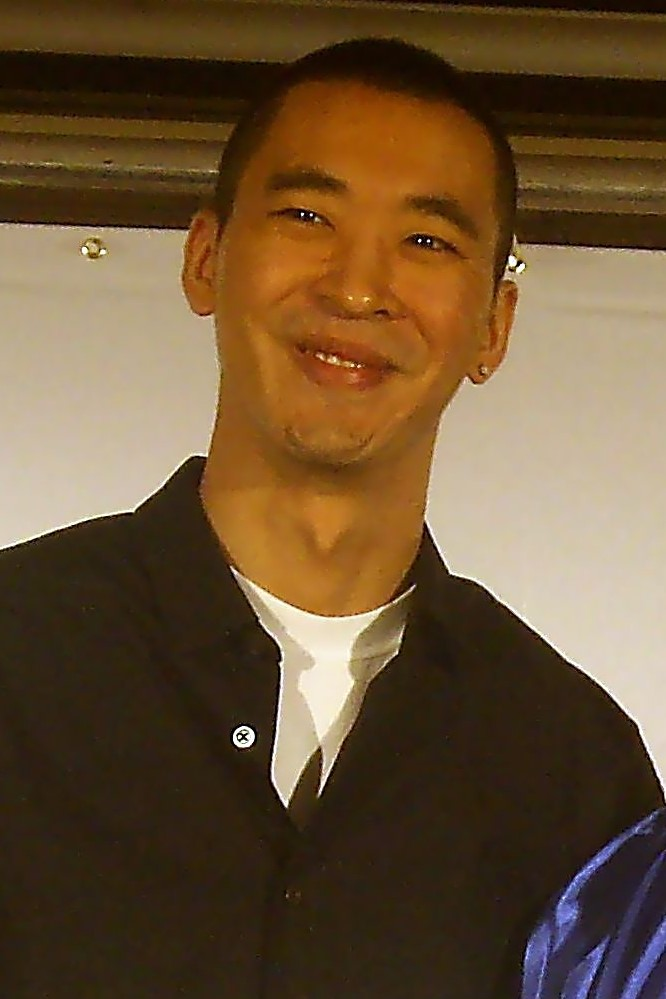
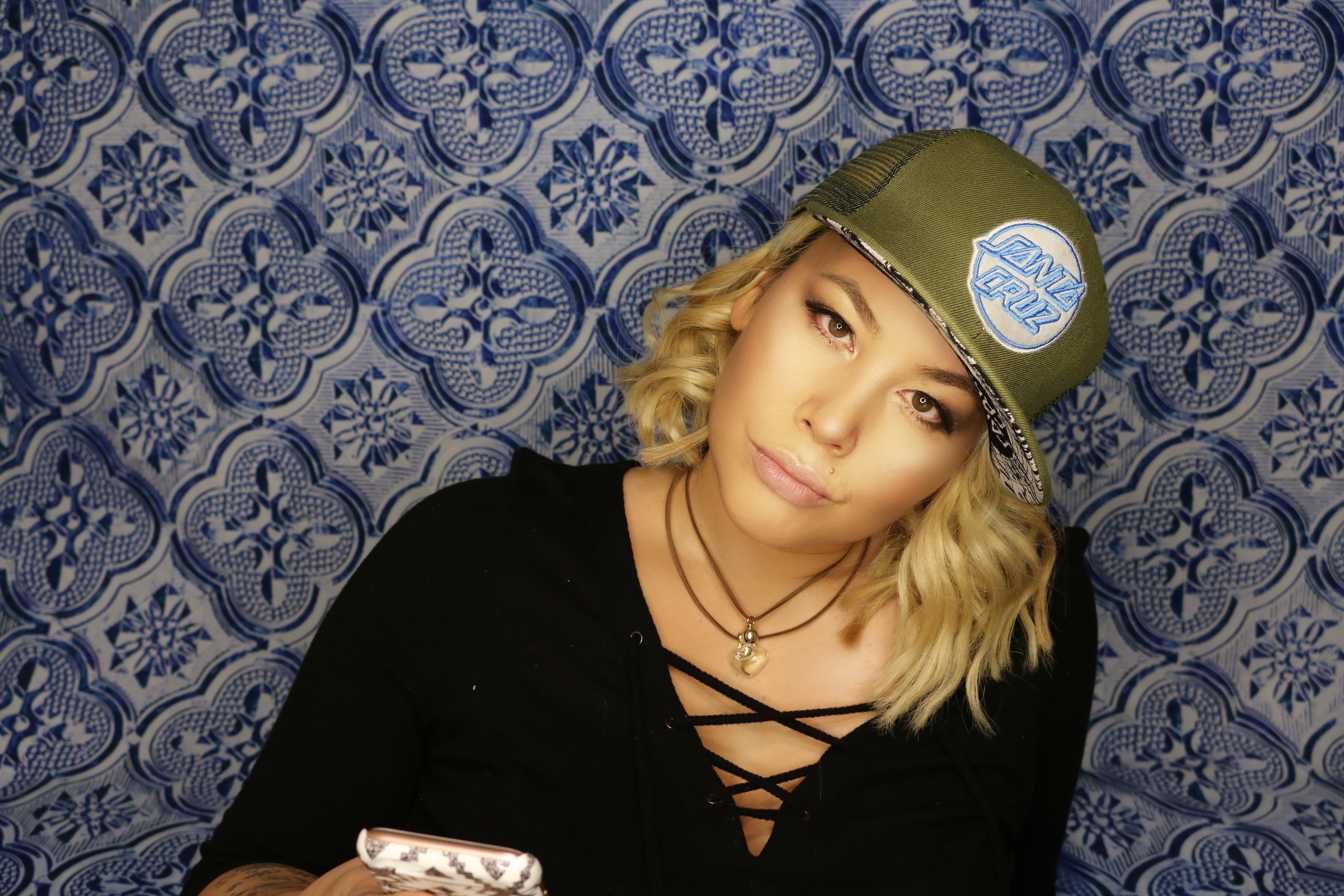
Two of Hsiao's collaborators on the album were Taiwanese singer-songwriter Stanley Huang (left) and Japanese singer-songwriter Sakura (right)

Tomorrow (Chinese: 明天) is the third studio album by Taiwanese singer Elva Hsiao, released on April 21, 2001, by Virgin Records Taiwan. The songs, "I Love You Lots" and "Tomorrow", reached number twenty–six and forty–nine respectively on Hit FM Annual Top 100 Singles in 2001.

== Track listing ==
Tomorrow – Standard edition
No.	Title	Writer(s)	Producer(s)	Length
1.	"Tomorrow" (明天)	Chien Yao; Chen Wei	Chen Wei	4:29
2.	"Secret" (秘密)	Chien Yao; Sky Wu; Jae Chong	Jae Chong	4:01
3.	"Let It Go" (feat. Stanley Huang)	Chien Yao; Jason Levine; James McCollum; Lau Chi Yuen	Jim Lee	3:59
4.	"Angel Has Left" (天使暫時離開)	Chien Yao; Anders Dannvik; Winston Sela; Lau Chi Yuen	Jim Lee	4:09
5.	"Say Less" (長話短說)	Lin Xi; Cho Gyu-Chan; Lau Chi Yuen	Jim Lee	4:17
6.	"I Love You Lots" (我愛你那麼多)	Chien Yao; Chen Wei	Chen Wei	3:38
7.	"Next Love" (下一次戀愛)	Chien Yao; Akira; Lau Chi Yuen	Lau Chi Yuen	5:04
8.	"Love's Beauty" (愛情美)	Lin-Xi; Budy Mokoginta; Lau Chi Yuen	Jim Lee	3:34
9.	"Say Yes" (答應我)	Daryl Yao; Lin Li-jien; Jae Chong	Jae Chong	4:30
10.	"Third Love" (愛第三次)	Julian Yu; Jae Chong	Jae Chong	3:44
Total length:				41:25

Tomorrow – Bonus VCD
No.	Title	Length
1.	"August 2000 concert tour" (夏日薔薇演唱會精彩實錄VCD)

Tomorrow – Hong Kong edition (Bonus CD)
No.	Title	Writer(s)	Producer(s)	Length
1.	"Let It Go (Cantonese Version)" (Let GO後樂園（廣東歌）)	Lin Xi; Jason Levine; James McCollum; Lau Chi Yuen	Jim Lee	3:59
Total length:				3:59
