= D's New Attraction =

- D's New Attraction (Cool Guy Edition) cover

Studio album D新引力 by Danson Tang
- Released: 16 January 2009
- Genre: Mandopop
- Length: 46:08
- Language: Mandarin
- Label: Avex Taiwan

Danson Tang chronology
Love Me (2007)	D's New Attraction (2009)	The First Second (2010)

Alternative cover

D's New Attraction (Chinese: D新引力; pinyin: D Xin Ying Li) is Taiwanese Mandopop artist Danson Tang's (Chinese: 唐禹哲) second Mandarin studio album. It was released on 16 January 2009 by Avex Taiwan with two album cover versions: D's New Attraction (Gentle Edition) and D's New Attraction (Cool Guy Edition), both with a bonus DVD. Two more editions were released: D's New Attraction (MV DVD Edition) and D's New Attraction (Photobook Edition), both on 13 February 2009.

The album features an insert song of Taiwanese drama, Rolling Love, "告訴我" (Tell Me), starring Danson, Jiro Wang and Genie Chuo.

== Track listing ==
1. "Kiss Me Now" - 4:17
2. "一言為定" Yī Yán Wéi Dìng (It's A Deal) - 3:23
3. "新歌" Xīn Gē (New Song) - 4:24
4. "告訴我" Gào Su Wǒ (Tell Me) - insert song of Rolling Love - 3:18
5. "捨不得放手" Shě Bù Dé Fàng Shǒu (Reluctant To Let Go) - 4:30
6. "傳話遊戲" Chuán Huà Yóu Xì (Messenger Game) - 3:47
7. "絕無僅有" Jué Wú Jǐn Yǒu (Unique) - 3:51
8. "不能不想她" Bù Néng Bù Xiǎng Tā (Can't Stop Thinking Of Her) - 4:48
9. "最溫柔的懸念" Zuì Wēn Róu De Xuán Niàn (Most Gentle Suspense) - 3:08
10. "情報" Qíng Bào (Intelligence) - 3:57

== Music videos ==
- "情報" (Intelligence) MV
- "新歌" (New Song) MV - directed by Huang Zhong Ping (黃中平)
- "最溫柔的懸念" (Most Gentle Suspense) MV
- "Kiss Me Now" MV
- "捨不得放手" (Reluctant To Let Go) MV

== Releases ==
Four editions were released by Avex Taiwan:

- 16 January 2009 - D's New Attraction (Gentle Edition) [D新引力 (D調柔情版)] (CD+DVD) - includes DVD with a 45-minute "Love Me Danson" music special
- 16 January 2009 - D's New Attraction (Cool Guy Edition) [D新引力 (唐潮酷男版)] (CD+DVD) - includes DVD with a 45-minute "Love Me Danson" music special
- 13 February 2009 - D's New Attraction (MV DVD Edition) [D新引力 (魅力影音版)] (CD+MV DVD) - includes DVD with 4 music videos (Note: as listed in the Music Videos section)
- 13 February 2009 - D's New Attraction (Photobook Edition) [D新引力-珍愛寫真版] (CD) - includes 40-page photobook
