= Theme Song of Love, Kissing =

Studio album by Elva Hsiao
- Released: 30 August 2002
- Genre: Mandopop
- Language: Chinese
- Label: Virgin

Elva Hsiao chronology
4U (2002)	Theme Song of Love, Kissing (2002)	So Elva (2003)

Theme Song of Love, Kissing (simplified Chinese: 爱的主打歌·吻; traditional Chinese: 愛的主打歌·吻) is the fifth studio album by Taiwanese singer Elva Hsiao, released on 30 August 2002 by Virgin Records Taiwan. The song, "Theme Song of Love", reached number nine on Hit FM Annual Top 100 Singles in 2002.

== Track listing ==
1. "愛的主打歌" (Theme Song of Love)
2. "U Make Me Wanna" (featuring Blue)
3. "吻" (Kissing)
4. "他和她的故事" (The Story of Him and Her)
5. "開始飛吧" (Spread Your Wings and Fly)
6. "穿越時空遇見你" (Meeting You Through Time and Space)
7. "轉眼之間" (In the Blink of an Eye)
8. "把心放進來" (Put Your Heart Inside)
9. "想念聖誕節" (Remembering Christmas)
10. "離境" (The Point of Goodbye)
11. "願" (Wishes)
12. "未來" (Future)
