= So Elva =

Studio album by Elva Hsiao
- Released: 16 May 2003
- Genre: Mandopop
- Language: Chinese
- Label: Virgin

Elva Hsiao chronology
Theme Song of Love, Kissing (2002)	So Elva (2003)	5th Avenue (2003)

So Elva (simplified Chinese: 爱上爱; traditional Chinese: 愛上愛) is the sixth studio album by Taiwanese singer Elva Hsiao (simplified Chinese: 萧亚轩; traditional Chinese: 蕭亞軒), released on 16 May 2003 by Virgin Records Taiwan.

== Track listing ==
1. "我就是我 (Remix)" (I Am Me)
2. "進行式" (Walk Style)
3. "開始愛" (Love Start)
4. "愛情專用" (Exclusive for Love)
5. "一輩子做你的女孩" (Your Girl for Life)
6. "愛上愛" (In Love with Love)
7. "想到你" (Think of You)
8. "原始" (Beginning)
9. "不配" (Not Worth)
10. "魔術" (Magic)
11. "我就是我" (I Am Me)
