= Rolling Love =

2008 Taiwanese television series

- Promotional poster
- Also known as: 翻滾吧！蛋炒飯; Fan Gun Ba! Dan Chao Fan
- Genre: Romance, comedy
- Directed by: Mingtai Wang (王明台)
- Starring: Jiro Wang; Danson Tang; Genie Chuo; Xiao Xun
- Opening theme: "恆星" (Shining Star) by Fahrenheit
- Ending theme: "永不消失的彩虹" (Never Ending Rainbow) by Genie Chuo
- Country of origin: Republic of China (Taiwan)
- Original languages: Mandarin; Min Nan
- No. of episodes: 12

Production
- Production locations: Jinshan, Taipei, Taiwan
- Running time: 90 minutes (Sundays at 22:00 to 23:30)
- Production company: Comic International Productions

Original release
- Network: China Television (CTV)
- Release: 4 May – 20 July 2008

Related
- They Kiss Again (惡作劇2吻); Hot Shot (籃球火)

Rolling Love (Chinese: 翻滾吧！蛋炒飯; pinyin: Fan Gun Ba! Dan Chao Fan) is a 2008 Taiwanese drama starring Jiro Wang of Fahrenheit, Danson Tang, Genie Chuo and Xiao Xun of Hey Girl. It was produced by Comic International Productions (可米國際影視事業股份有限公司) and directed by Mingtai Wang (王明台). The drama started filming on 30 October 2007 and wrapped on 21 March 2008. It was filmed on location in Jinshan, Taipei, Taiwan.

It was first broadcast in Taiwan on free-to-air China Television (CTV) (中視) from 4 May 2008 to 7 July 2008, every Sunday at 22:00 to 23:30 and cable TV Gala Television (GTV) Variety Show/CH 28 (八大綜合台) from 10 May 2008 to 26 July 2008, every Saturday at 21:00 to 22:30.

== Synopsis ==
Mi Qi Lin(米麒麟) (Jiro Wang) is the chef of lunchtime diner "Egg Fried Rice" in a village by the sea in Jinshan, Taipei that only serves a popular egg fried rice dish. However little does people, outside of the village, know that this infamous egg fried rice dish is the only thing that he knows how to cook. He relies on this skill that his father passed onto him, and earns a reputation and a living by cooking 100 plates of it every day.

In another world, there is Leng Lie (冷冽) (Danson Tang), a young talented chef, who graduated from the best cordon bleu school at 14 years old and regarded by many for his near perfect cuisine. He is admired as a representative of the highest standards and by women as their Mr Perfect. He is the executive chef at Imperial Hotel, owned by his father. However he has one regret in his heart ...

Two years ago on Valentine's Day, the day Leng Lie planned to confess his feeling to his childhood sweetheart Guan Xiao Shu (關小舒) (Genie Chuo), they were involved in a car accident. As a result, Xiao Shu, a singer/songwriter, lost her sight. Naturally Leng Lie feels responsible but Xiao Shu refuse to blame him and did not change her happy outlook to life. However every time he talks to her about their future together, she turns him down, not wanting a love based on remorse.

Until one day, Xiao Shu arrives at Mi Qi Lin's diner and tasted his egg fried rice. This simple and plain dish had an odd effect on her, she felt relaxed and carefree, giving her a sweet taste of happiness. Upon meeting Xiao Shu, Mi Qi Lin experiences many flavours of food and love and likewise, Mi Qi Lin's frank nature gives Xiao Shu the ability to cultivate an independent lifestyle. All the while, the growing feelings between Xiao Shu and Mi Qi Lin is witnessed by Leng Lie.

== Cast ==
Actor	Character	Relationships
Jiro Wang (汪東城)	Mi Qi Lin/Michelin (米麒麟)	
Danson Tang (唐禹哲)	Leng Lie (冷冽)	
Genie Chuo (卓文萱)	Guan Xiao Shu (關小舒)	
Xiao Xun (小薰)	Wa Sa Mi or Wasabi (哇莎米)	manageress of "Egg Fried Rice"
Ken (黃萬伯)	Cai San Cheng (蔡山城)	Mi Qi Lin's friend
Huang Jia Qian (黃嘉千)	Nancy	Xiao Shu's aunt and Leng Lie's housekeeper
Lance Yu (余秉諺)	Jerry	Xiao Shu's record company manager
Liu Zhe Ying (劉喆瑩)	Tilly	Leng Lie's PA
Yun Zhong Yue (雲中岳)	Leng Zhong Tian (冷中天)	Leng Lie's father
Huang Xi Tian (黃西田)	林萬福	
Jin Wen (僅雯)	Gui Po Po (鬼婆婆)	Mi Qi Lin's landlady
A Jiao (阿嬌)	阿好姨（餿水桶姨）	Mi Qi Lin's neighbour
Bu Xue Liang (卜學亮)	Fu Ye (福爺)	Head chef at Imperial Hotel
Judy Zhou	Qiu Lin (仇琳)	Leng Lie's old school friend
Chen Han-dian	Rogue	Cameo
	Shan Cheng Ju (單承矩)	
	Xu Yu Zhen (煦于蓁/羽兒)	
	Ah Mai Er (阿脈兒)	

== Soundtrack ==
Rolling Love

Soundtrack album by Various artists
- Released: 13 June 2008
- Genre: Mandopop
- Language: Mandarin
- Label: Rock Records

Rolling Love Original Soundtrack (CD+DVD) (翻滾吧！蛋炒飯 電視原聲帶) was released on 13 June 2008 by Various artists under Rock Records. It contains eleven songs, in which five songs are various kala versions of the songs. Two versions were released for the album: CD+VCD edition (with lyrics photo booklet and a VCD), and CD+DVD edition (with lyrics photo booklet, TV drama recipe cards, and a DVD). The track, "永不消失的彩虹" (Never Ending Rainbow) by Genie Chuo was the ending theme song of the TV series.

=== Track listing ===
No.	Title	Singer(s)	Length
1.	"Never Ending Rainbow" (永不消失的彩虹)	Genie Chuo
2.	"La La La Love Code" (LALALA愛情密碼)	Genie Chuo
3.	"Love's Magic Coat" (愛情魔法衣)	Genie Chuo
4.	"Initiative Response" (直覺反應)	Fong Jiong Jia (方炯嘉)
5.	"Initiative Response - Redface version" (直覺反應 - 臉紅版)	Fong Jiong Jia (方炯嘉)
6.	"Going Mad" (瘋了瘋了)	Genie Chuo - composed by Kenji Wu
7.	"Never Ending Rainbow Kala version" (永不消失的彩虹)
8.	"La La La Love Code Kala ver." (LALALA愛情密碼)
9.	"Love's Magic Coat Kala ver." (愛情魔法衣)
10.	"Initiative Response Kala ver." (直覺反應)
11.	"Going Mad Kala ver." (瘋了瘋了)

Bonus VCD / DVD
No.	Title	Length
1.	"Never Ending Rainbow music video - feat Jiro Wang" (永不消失的彩虹 MV)
2.	"Rolling Love" (drama highlights)
3.	"Rolling Love" (behind-the-scenes footage)
4.	"Over The Rainbow" (music special)
5.	"Guan Xiao Shu vs Genie Chuo" (Interview)

In addition, there are two songs not included in the original soundtrack: The opening theme song, which is "恆星" or "Shining Star" by Fahrenheit from their Love You More and More album, and an insert song by Danson Tang entitled "Tell Me", released in his D's New Attraction album.

== Books ==
- 12 May 2008: Rolling Love Photobook (翻滾吧！蛋炒飯幕後紀實) - ISBN 978-957-565-816-8
- 23 May 2008: Rolling Love TV Drama Novel (翻滾吧！蛋炒飯電視小說) - ISBN 978-957-565-817-5

== Reception ==
China Television (CTV) (中視) Ratings
Episode	Original Broadcast Date	Average	Rank	Remark
1	4 May 2008	1.30	2	Peaked 1.45
2	11 May 2008	1.17	2	
3	18 May 2008	0.82	3	CTS Wish To See You Again series finale
4	25 May 2008	0.97	3	CTS Honey & Clover premiere
5	1 June 2008	0.97	3	
6	8 June 2008	0.83	2	
7	15 June 2008	0.83	2	
8	22 June 2008	0.94	2	
9	29 June 2008	0.98	2	
10	6 July 2008	0.63	3	
11	13 July 2008	0.62	3	
12	20 July 2008	0.75	2	
Average		0.90		

Rival dramas on air at the same time:

- Taiwan Television (TTV) (台視): Fated to Love You
- Chinese Television System (CTS) (華視): Wish To See You Again (這裡發現愛) / Honey & Clover (蜂蜜幸運草)
