= Miss Elva =

- Standard cover

Studio album by Elva Hsiao
- Released: September 24, 2010
- Recorded: 2010
- Genre: Dance-pop; electropop
- Length: 41:21
- Language: Chinese
- Label: Gold Typhoon
- Producer: Andrew Chan; Jae Chong; Elva Hsiao; Adia; Paula Ma; Xharkie

Elva Hsiao chronology
Diamond Candy (2009)	Miss Elva (2010)	I'm Ready (2011)

Alternative cover

Singles from Miss Elva
- 1. "Miss Genuine" Released: September 1, 2010; 2. "Wrong Man" Released: September 24, 2010; 3. "Rhapsody" Released: September 24, 2010; 4. "Let Love Fly" Released: September 24, 2010

Miss Elva (Chinese: 蕭灑小姐; pinyin: Xiāosǎ xiǎojiě) is the eleventh studio album by Taiwanese recording artist Elva Hsiao, released on September 24, 2010, by Gold Typhoon. Hsiao enlisted various songwriters to help produce and compose the record, including Andrew Chan, Jae Chong, Adia, Paula Ma, and Kenji Wu.

Miss Elva saw commercial success upon release, becoming the ninth best-selling album in Taiwan during 2010. It went on to sell over 100,000 copies in Taiwan and over 500,000 across Asia. The album produced singles such as the lead single "Miss Genuine", "Wrong Man", "Rhapsody", and "Let Love Fly".

== Singles ==
The lead single "Miss Genuine" premiered on radio stations across Asia on September 1, 2010. The songs, "Wrong Man", "Miss Genuine", and "Rhapsody", reached number four, twenty-five, and sixty-five respectively on Hit FM Annual Top 100 Singles in 2010.

== Critical reception ==
Music critic Sanshi Yisheng commented that the album featured not only eye-catching music videos and stylish promotions but also many lyrical and slow songs that resonate with listeners. The editor also commented that Hsiao's medium-tempo dance tracks showcased an excellent performance that "keeps pace with the times," and suggested that the album is destined for "strong momentum in the future."

== Commercial performance ==
Pre-orders for Miss Elva reached 45,000 copies. Ten days after the album was released, it topped the seven major record charts in Taiwan, with a total sales of 75,326 copies. Within two months, 97,365 copies were sold in Taiwan, and 500,000 copies were shipped in Asia. On the year-end Taiwanese album chart for 2010, Miss Elva ranked as the ninth best-selling album of the year.

== Track listing ==
Miss Elva – Standard edition
No.	Title	Writer(s)	Producer(s)	Length
1.	"Miss Genuine" (瀟灑小姐)	David Ke; Andrew Chan	Andrew Chan	3:42
2.	"Rhapsody" (狂想∙曲)	Jang, Jae Young; Jae Chong	Jae Chong	3:40
3.	"Complete Me - The Overture of Hold You Tight" (完整我 (抱緊你序曲))	Elva Hsiao; Josh Chen	Elva Hsiao	1:14
4.	"Hold You Tight" (抱緊你)	Luke Tsui; Justin Michael Drury; Kemal Golden; Kemal Golden; Cheryline Ernestine Lim; Jae Chong	Jae Chong	3:30
5.	"Let Love Fly" (讓愛飛起來)	Elva Hsiao; Lars Quang; Niels Gade	Andrew Chan	3:34
6.	"Thin" (瘦瘦瘦瘦)	Issac Chen; Frida Molander; Christinan Rabb; Jonas Nilsson; Charlie Mason	Liu Wenren	3:22
7.	"Joke" (玩笑)	Howard Chiang; Zyan Chen; Martin Tang	Paula Ma	4:43
8.	"Mr. Liar" (大說謊家)	Elva Hsiao; Justing Michael Drury; Kemal Golden; Kristen Ashley Cole; Malcolm Harvest	Jae Chong	3:25
9.	"Wrong Man" (錯的人)	Kenji Wu; Chou Henyi	Paula Ma	5:09
10.	"Two Faced Goddess" (雙面女神)	Ma Songwei; Anjulie Persaud; Jon Levine; Liao Weije	Adia	3:14
11.	"Dream I: Show Me Your Way" (夢境 I)	Elva Hsiao; Josh Chen	Elva Hsiao	1:38
12.	"Dream II: I Am Not Afraid" (夢境 II)	Elva Hsiao; C. Shack; K. Karlin; Frankie Storm; Josh Chen	Elva Hsiao; Xharkie	4:23
Total length:				41:21

== Charts ==
=== Weekly charts ===
Chart (2010)	Peak position
Taiwanese Albums (G-Music)	1

=== Year-end charts ===
Chart (2010)	Position
Taiwanese Albums (G-Music)	9

== Sales ==
Region	Certification	Certified units/sales
Taiwan	—	100,000
Summaries
Asia	—	500,000

== Release history ==
Release history for Miss Elva
Region	Date	Format(s)	Version	Label
Taiwan	September 24, 2010	CD; CD+DVD; digital download; streaming	Standard	Gold Typhoon
Taiwan	September 24, 2010	CD	Chic edition	Gold Typhoon
Taiwan	September 24, 2010	CD	Miss edition	Gold Typhoon
Taiwan	November 12, 2010	CD+DVD	Commemorate CD+DVD Edition	Gold Typhoon
