= 3 Faced Elva =

- 3 Faced Elva cover

Studio album by Elva Hsiao
- Released: June 15, 2008
- Recorded: 2008
- Genre: Pop
- Length: 48:57
- Language: Mandarin
- Label: EMI Music Taiwan

Elva Hsiao chronology
1087 (2006)	3 Faced Elva (2008)	Diamond Candy (2009)

3 Faced Elva (Chinese: 3面夏娃; pinyin: San Mian Xia Wa) is the ninth studio album by Taiwanese recording artist Elva Hsiao. It was released on June 15, 2008 by EMI Music Taiwan and her first album since returning to EMI Music Taiwan. It was made available for pre-order on June 2, 2008.

== Background and release ==
The release of 3 Faced Elva contains the standard edition plus three new editions. 3 Faced Elva (Self Edition) was released on June 27, 2008, 3 Faced Elva (Brave Edition) was released on July 17, 2008, and 3 Faced Elva (MV Collectible Edition) was released on July 25, 2008.

== Accolades ==
The track "I'll Be There" won one of the Songs of the Year at the 2008 Metro Radio Mandarin Music Awards presented in Hong Kong.

== Track listing ==
3 Faced Elva – Standard edition
No.	Title	Length
1.	"I'll Be There"	3:40
2.	"Impulse" (衝動)	4:35
3.	"Both Lonely" (兩個人的寂寞)	4:13
4.	"More More More"	3:13
5.	"Time Tunnel" (時光隧道)	5:18
6.	"Speed Dating" (速配程度; featuring Nese Ni)	3:11
7.	"Hereafter" (之後)	5:01
8.	"Baby Girl"	3:19
9.	"Hey Girl"	3:09
10.	"Similar to Love" (類似愛情)	4:40
11.	"Pulses of Love" (暫停戀愛)	3:36
12.	"You Can't See the Places" (你看不見的地方)	5:02
Total length:		48:57

3 Faced Elva – DVD
No.	Title	Length
1.	"I'll Be There"
2.	"Impulse"
3.	"More More More"
4.	"Both Lonely"

== Charts ==
Chart performance for 3 Faced Elva
Chart (2008)	Peak position
Taiwanese Albums (G-Music)	2

== Release history ==
Release history for 3 Faced Elva
Region	Date	Format(s)	Version	Label	Ref.
Taiwan	June 15, 2008	CD; digital download; streaming	Standard	Gold Typhoon	
Taiwan	June 27, 2008	CD	Self edition	Gold Typhoon	
Taiwan	July 17, 2008	CD	Brave edition	Gold Typhoon	
Taiwan	July 25, 2008	CD+DVD	MV Collectible edition	Gold Typhoon	
