= Diamond Candy =

Studio album by Elva Hsiao
- Released: October 9, 2009
- Recorded: 2009
- Genre: Electropop; dance-pop
- Length: 38:40
- Language: Chinese
- Label: Gold Typhoon

Elva Hsiao chronology
3 Faced Elva (2008)	Diamond Candy (2009)	Miss Elva (2010)

Alternative cover

Singles from Diamond Candy
- 1. "Shining Love" Released: September 21, 2009; 2. "Diamond Candy" Released: October 9, 2009; 3. "Beautiful Encounter" Released: October 9, 2009

Diamond Candy (Chinese: 鑽石糖) is the tenth studio album by Taiwanese recording artist Elva Hsiao, released on October 9, 2009, by Gold Typhoon. It produced various singles such as "Shining Love" and "Diamond Candy". The album became the seventh best-selling album of the year in Taiwan.

== Singles ==
"Shining Love" premiered as the lead single from the album on radio stations across Asia on September 21, 2009. The title track "Diamond Candy" and "Beautiful Encounter" were also promoted after the album's release.

== Track listing ==
Diamond Candy – Standard edition
No.	Title	Length
1.	"Beautiful Encounter" (豔遇)	3:08
2.	"Shining Love" (閃閃惹人愛)	3:19
3.	"Count Down" (倒數)	4:06
4.	"Cry with You" (我陪你哭)	3:53
5.	"Sync Breathing" (同步呼吸)	4:06
6.	"Goodbye Bye Bye" (不愛·請閃開)	3:28
7.	"Diamond Candy" (鑽石糖)	4:11
8.	"Confession" (坦白)	3:48
9.	"No Hand in Hand" (我們多久沒牽手)	5:02
10.	"Thriller Legend" (顫慄傳奇)	3:39
Total length:		38:40

Wow Concert Songs + Remixes – Bonus tracks
No.	Title	Length
11.	"Wow" (羅志祥)	3:11
12.	"Shining Love" (閃閃惹人愛; Break Beat Remix)	4:12
13.	"Goodbye Bye Bye" (不愛，請閃開; Trance Remix)	4:21
14.	"Illusion" (沒有人; Spanish Version)	4:33
15.	"I Love You That Much" (我愛你那麼多; Just Chill Out Remix)	4:01
16.	"Cast Aside" (甩啦甩啦; Salsa Hot Mix)	3:53
17.	"More More More" (Techno Remix)	3:49
18.	"The Most Familiar Stranger" (最熟悉的陌生人; Urban Beat Remix)	4:41
Total length:		32:41

== Charts ==
=== Weekly charts ===
Chart (2009)	Peak position
Taiwanese Albums (G-Music)	1

=== Year-end charts ===
Chart (2009)	Position
Taiwanese Albums (G-Music)	7

== Release history ==
Release history for Diamond Candy
Region	Date	Format(s)	Version	Label
Taiwan	October 9, 2009	CD; digital download; streaming	Pre-order version	Gold Typhoon
Taiwan	October 9, 2009	CD; digital download; streaming	Diamond edition	Gold Typhoon
Taiwan	October 9, 2009	CD; digital download; streaming	Candy version	Gold Typhoon
Taiwan	November 6, 2009	2CD	Wow Concert Songs + Remixes	Gold Typhoon
