= Chien Yao =

Taiwanese lyricist

Chien Yao 姚謙
- Born: June 21, 1961 (age 65); Tainan, Taiwan
- Occupation: Lyricist
- Years active: 1980s-present

Chien Yao (Chinese: 姚謙; pinyin: Yáo Qiān; born June 21, 1961) is a Taiwanese lyricist and author, known for supporting and beginning the careers of many artists. Yao is known to write about female sentiments. He has supported the careers of many A-list singers. Yao had served in Dian Jiang Records and Sony Music Taiwan, and had been the GM of EMI Records Taiwan, Virgin Records Taiwan, and Music Nation Group Taiwan. Yao is currently retired from executive positions and serves as an exclusive writer for Warner Chappell Music, Hong Kong Limited Taiwan Branch.

== Early life ==
Yao grew up in a veteran family from Tainan. From a very young age, his love for arts has developed and he was very active in participating in all kinds of arts contest. Although he never received any recognition then, the contests allowed him to reinforce his passion for arts and develop his own perspective. With Industrial Design as his major, Yao studied in Tainan Kunshan College (now Kunshan Technology University), he started his career being a car salesman in Honda. Yao suffered from health problems and had to quit his job. Yao decided that he should engage in something that he is passionate about. When the Taiwanese pop music industry was booming in the early 1980s, Yao quickly found himself a marketing job in the industry.

== Career ==
| 1984-1987 | Hai Li Records |
| 1987-1995 | Dian Jiang Records |
| 1995-1997 | Sony Music Taiwan, Director of Local Market |
| 1997-1998 | Sony Music Taiwan, Director |
| 1999-2002 | Virgin Records, General Manager |
| 2002-2005 | EMI Records, General Manager |
| 2008-2009 | Music Nation Group Taiwan, General Manager |
| 2005-Now | Music Nation Ursa Major Limited, General Manager |

=== Early career ===
Initially, Yao worked at Haili Records as the Recording Administrative Assistant. He worked with Ling Jiang. Yao incorporated Murong Xi's poem “Regretless Youth 無怨的青春”, and the album was financially successful. After that album, Yao went to Dianjiang Records, a record label at the time, to manage Stella Chang's album. Nana Chiang's “Jin Sheng Zui Tong De Ge 今生最痛的歌” was his debut work.

He used to go to Japan very often, and on one occasion, after heard a Japanese Enka “Yakushya”, wrote Taiwanese lyrics, dubbing that song. That was Yao's first attempt to write in Taiwanese. The song that would later on lead to Yao and Jody Chiang's collaboration.

Over the decade of Yao's career at Dianjiang, he helped various artists, including Nana Chiang, Sky Wu, Jody Chiang, Monique Lin, etc. His work “I'm Willing 我願意” in 1994, written for Faye Wong, has reached and remained on the KTV charts since then. Eventually, Dianjiang was acquired by EMI, and Yao went to Sony Music to be the General Manager for Chinese pop music. Under his management, Yao assisted in the careers of artists such as Coco Lee, Harlem Yu, and Leehom Wang.

In 1998, Virgin Music invited Yao to be the General Manager, in charge of the Chinese music business under the whole Virgin Group. Yao assisted artists Elva Hsiao, Maggie Chiang, Angela Hou, Sandy Lam, Stanley Huang, Rene Liu, Ailin Dai during his employment.

Yao left Virgin Music in 2005 and served as the General Manager for Music Nation Ursa Major Limited, and the Vice President for Le Music, managing artists like Xiaoming Huang, Quan Yuan, and Coco Lee.

=== Songwriting ===
In the 1980s, Yao's “The Dull Ice Flower 魯冰花” was popular in the Chinese music industry. In 1989, a Taiwanese director Li-Kuo Yang produced the movie “The Dull Ice Flower”. As the theme song, being too hard for the children actors to learn, Li-kuo Yang sought the assistance of Yao. Yao wrote a new song for the movie, which met success, winning "Best Original Film Song" from Golden Horse Awards in the same year.

After that, Yao continued musical productions and worked with singers such as Monique Lin, Stella Chang, Sky Wu, Jody Chiang, Coco Lee, Leehom Wang, Harlem Yu, Sandy Lam, Rene Liu, etc. His works include Jody Chiang's “Life of an Artist 藝界人生”, Stella Chang's “La California 加州陽光”, Sky Wu's “Sharing 分享”, Winnie Hsin's “Scent 味道”, Faye Wong's “I'm Willing 我願意”, Harlem Yu's “Just for You 只有為你”, and Coco Lee's “Di Da Di”, etc. Later in the years, Yao would produce songs Hsiao's “The Most Familiar Stranger 最熟悉的陌生人”, Karen Mok's “Love 愛情”, Ailing Dai's “Mr. Right 對的人”, Tanya Chua's “Ji Nian 紀念”, “Stranger 陌生人”, and Maggie Chiang's “How I Envy You 我多麼羨慕你”.

=== Other productions ===
In 2006, Yao was awarded with Best Original Film Song by Hong Kong Film Award with “Perhaps Love 如果愛”. He also served as the music director of “Amber 琥珀”, a multimedia musical that was successful in China, Hong Kong and Singapore, and “Mo Shan魔山”, a children's theater production. He also worked with Subaru China on its annual theme song “Wo Xing Wo Lu 我行我路” in 2011. Invited by Director Han Xiao in 2016, Yao produced the music for the documentary “Masters in the Forbidden City”. He collaborated with many young musicians and used softer melodies to express the craftsmen's attitude towards life.

Other than these contributions on music, Yao also engaged himself in film productions. In 2012, Yao produced “Melody 腳趾上的星光”, which is an animated movie that incorporated his scriptwriting, novel story, and music. The story used love letters to tell the story of a long-distance relationship between Taipei and Beijing. In 2017, Yao was inspired by his own experiences in art collection, and invited Director Hao-Hsuan Hsu to film and produce the movie “Ah-Art”. This movie was later selected by Toronto Reel Asian Film Festival as the movie representative of Taiwan.

=== Other appearances ===
Yao has been engaged in fashion and exhibitions. In 2007, he organized the "Southeast Asian Art Exhibition". Other than this particular exhibition, Yao's involvement in the promotion and organization of artistic events has continued over the years.

In 2013, Yao published "Sense It", expressing his personal perspective on fashion, taste, and lifestyle. In 2014, Yao compiled columns he wrote for Crown Culture Corp. and published “Mei Li De Xiang Yu 美麗的相遇”. Other than publishing literature, Yao also participated as the panel judge for "Chinese Million Star". He was one of the eight pallbearers for Coco Lee's funeral, 31 July 2023. Currently, Yao is informally retired, but is still occasionally involved in the music industry, arts, and literature

=== Style ===
Yao has been influenced by the writings of Tien-wen Chu and Eileen Chang when he was reading their novels at a young age. He has been influenced by them, with his writing style following a pattern of describing the environment first, followed by actions, then writing out the people's state of mind.

Yao's lyrics are mostly about revelation and liberation from emotions after ending a relationship. In his later career, Yao has the habit of reading his lyrics out loud, for the purpose of detecting phony terms and revising the words to be more colloquial.

=== Female perspective ===
In Yao's work, observations of female emotions are often seen. He personally believes that his frequent association with female artists is just a coincidence, as the artists in the record label at the time were all women (Jody Chiang, Nana Chiang, Monique Lin, Shu-chin Tseng, etc.)

Yao's lyrics often include themes of women's empathy and sentiments. Singers like Rene Liu, Elva Hsiao, Coco Lee, Winnie Hsin, and Tanya Chua often respect him and see him as their teacher and brother.

When being asked to compare himself with Jonathan Lee, another songwriter who's highly acclaimed for his understanding of women, Yao thinks that Lee writes about women from a male perspective, whereas he himself writes from a female perspective.

=== Collector ===
Other than music, Yao is also active in culture and arts in general. In his house in Taipei, there is a wall in the living room that's dedicated to what he claims to be the collection of "Greatest Asian oil paintings in the 20th century". His house in Beijing is also full of artworks that he gathered from around the globe. The insights and perspectives he's provided in his written articles have been cited by many art history scholars and students from Central Academy of Fine Arts and National Tsing Hua University.

=== Literary works ===
Other than written critics on arts, Yao also published several literary works like prose writing and novels. In 2010, he compiled his published columns into the novel “Wo Yuan Yi 我願意”, which is a love story about the letter correspondences between Beijing and Taichung. In 2012, he published a fictional romantic novel “Melody 腳趾上的星光”, along with its animated movie. In 2013, his work “Sense It品味” was published In 2018, his newest publication “As Song, As Life” was published by UNITAS Publishing Co. Over the years, Yao has published six books in total. He also has numerous appearances online, such as on shixiang.xin to discuss about Eileen Chang's work, and also on “Ge Ci Shi Guang 歌詞時光”, the page he built on Douban.com to share his lyrical writings.

== Works ==
| Songs | Singer |
|---|---|
| 今生最痛的歌、有伴的心、兩個人的月亮 | Nana Chiang |
| 加州陽光、簾後、舉棋不定、認真的眼睛 | Stella Chang |
| 分享、最愛是你、有夢有朋友 | Sky Wu |
| 我願意 | Faye Wong |
| 味道、夢外、無奈、我也會愛上別人的 | Winnie Hsin |
| 直覺、心情卡片、多想 | Jeff Chang |
| 靠近、只有為你、讓你媽媽NEW一下、讓自己HIGH | Harlem Yu |
| 我是如此愛你、可以勇敢可以溫柔、愛難求、天天夜夜 | Monique Lin |
| 公轉自轉、信任 | Leehom Wang |
| 往日情、Di Da Di、自己（電影「花木蘭」中文主題曲） | Coco Lee |
| 最熟悉的陌生人、進行式、地下鐵、Cappuccino | Elva Hsiao |
| 盼你在此、飛的理由、非愛不可 | Sandy Lam |
| 電台情歌、愛情 | Karen Mok |
| I'm Sorry、Dear Friend、恰好的寂寞、眷戀 | Shunza |
| 親愛的你怎麼不在身邊、我們都是有歌的人 | Maggie Chiang |
| 陌生人、紀念、下一次愛情來的時候、深信不疑 | Tanya Chua |
| 對的人、分分秒秒、我該得到 | Ailin Dai |
| 黑的意念、你身邊 | Stanley Huang |
| 分開旅行、聽是誰在唱歌、越愛越美麗 | Rene Liu |

== Awards and recognition ==
- “Perhaps Love 如果愛”, Winner of Hong Kong Film Award for Best Original Film Song (2006)
- “The Dull-Ice Flower 魯冰花”, Winner of Golden Horse Awards for “Best Original Film Song” (1989)
- “When Dreams Come True 明月幾時圓” was nominated for “Best Lyricist” in the 4th Golden Melody Awards (1992)
- “Jiu Shang Xin Qin 舊傷新情” was nominated for “Best Lyricist” in the 3rd Golden Melody Awards (1991)
