= Danson Tang =

Musical artist of Taiwan

Danson Tang 唐禹哲
- Born: 2 September 1984 (age 41); Keelung, Taiwan
- Occupations: Singer, actor, model
- Years active: 2004–present
- Children: 2 sons
- Awards: 2007 Metro Radio Hit Awards – Best Overseas New Artist; 2008 Metro Radio Mandarin Music Awards – Songs of the Year
- Musical career
- Also known as: DT
- Genres: Mandopop
- Instruments: Vocal, piano, guitar
- Label: Comprise Boundless Entertainment (2011–present)

Danson Tang (Chinese: 唐禹哲; pinyin: Táng Yǔzhé) is a Taiwanese model, actor and singer.

== Early life ==
Tang was born on 2 September 1984, in Keelung, Taiwan. He has an elder sister who is four years older. When Tang was fourteen, his father died in a work-related accident, leaving his mother to care for him and his sister on her own. To support the family and fund his sister’s overseas education, Tang’s mother had to leave home to find work, leaving him to live alone. Relatives and neighbors occasionally checked in on him to ensure his well-being. Tang has stated that this experience of living alone made it difficult for him to open up to others about his feelings.

Tang dropped out from Asia Eastern University of Science and Technology in 2006. He later studied at Hsing Wu University, majoring in English, until he dropped out.

== Career ==
=== Pre-debut ===
Tang was discovered while working part-time at a Japanese restaurant during his college years. His career started out as a commercial model and appearing on other artists' music videos. Some of his more popular early work included appearing in two music videos for Hong Kong pop duo Twins during the height of their popularity.

=== Acting ===
After gaining recognition through his commercial work, Tang was contacted by Taiwanese television station GTV for an acting management contract. After reviewing his new career endeavor with his mother, he signed with GTV in 2004 to act in dramas that aired on their network. At first appearing only in minor supporting roles he eventually moved up to main cast roles when he was cast as the villain in 2005 popular idol drama KO One starring opposite Taiwanese boy band Fahrenheit members. He continued his collaboration with the group and their acting management company "Comic International Productions" in idol dramas such as Hanazakarino Kimitachihe, The X-Family, They Kiss Again and Rolling Love.

Originally cast as the main lead in Mysterious Incredible Terminator, the drama production company later switched his role with Fahrenheit member Aaron Yan, which Tang ended up starring as the second male lead in Rolling Love due to Yan suffering an injury. Due to Rolling Love's subpar ratings, as well as feeling overshadowed and under promoted by his acting management company, he eventually left GTV's management in 2011 and signed with Comprise Boundless Entertainment.

After leaving GTV he continued with main supporting roles in Mainland produced dramas. In 2012, Tang landed his first leading role in a major production for newly formed Hong Kong television network HKTV, starring in the idol drama Love in Time playing a 200-year-old vampire who falls in love with a human girl. Tang, who is not fluent in Cantonese, had his voice dubbed over by a voice actor. However, as of current the drama remains un-aired and does not have a set schedule of when it will air due to HKTV unavailability to obtain a free television programme service licence from the Hong Kong government.

In 2013 Tang returned to Taiwan produced dramas by signing an acting contract with local cable station SETTV. His first drama with SETTV was as the second male lead in A Hint of You. The following year he was cast as the male lead in SETTV's weekly drama Fabulous 30. With strong ratings from Fabulous 30, he was once again offered a leading role by SETTV for their 2015 Friday night drama Murphy's Law of Love. Then in 2017, Tang scored a supporting role as Bai Zhou in Chinese drama, Our Boyhood (我们的少年时代), which starred the famous idol boy band, TFBOYS. Tang also had sung the song in 我们的少年时代, 再见安打.

=== Music ===
On 9 July 2007, Tang signed with Avex Taiwan and released his debut solo album Love Me (愛我) on 17 August 2007. This was followed by D's New Attraction (D新引力) in 2009 and The First Second (D1秒) in 2010. He released his first new song plus collection compilation album, Towards Tomorrow's Journey (開往明天的旅行) on 26 April 2011, in two versions, Guardian Edition (守護盤) and Journey Edition (啟程盤). It contains 15 previously released tracks and three new songs, including lead track "Towards Tomorrow's Journey" (開往明天的旅行).

== Personal life ==
Tang often collaborated with boyband Fahrenheit to the point that he was sometimes mistaken as a member of the band. He is close friends with one of the band's members, Jiro Wang.

In 2023, Tang proposed to Becky Su, an American-Taiwanese actress and model whose family business served as the agency for Daikin in Taiwan, on the Chinese reality show Call Me By Fire (Season 3). Shortly after he revealed that had a son with his ex-girlfriend 11 years ago, of which Su was aware. In 2024, Tang revealed that he had a second son, born two years ago, with Su.

== Filmography ==
=== Television series ===
Year	Network	Chinese title	English title	Role	Character
2004	GTV	火線任務	Blazing Courage	Supporting role	Tang Yun Sheng (唐雲生)
2005	GTV / CTV	撞球小子	Nine-Ball	Supporting role	Ah Cao (阿草)
2005	GTV	終極一班	KO One	Main cast	Lei Ke Si (Lex) (雷克斯)
2006	PTS	幸福牌電冰箱	Lucky Brand Refrigerator	Main cast	Bo Bo (波波)
2006	CTS / GTV	花樣少年少女	Hanazakarino Kimitachihe	Supporting role	Liang Si Nan (梁思南) / Minami Nanba
2007	CTS / GTV	熱情仲夏	Summer x Summer	Supporting role	Tian Guang Zhen (田光楨)
2007	GTV	終極一家	The X-Family	Main cast	Xia Lan Xing De Yu (夏蘭荇德‧宇) / Gui Feng (鬼鳳)
2007	CTV / GTV	惡作劇2吻	They Kiss Again	Supporting role	Ouyang Gan (aka Gan Gan) (歐陽幹 (aka 幹幹))
2008	CTV / GTV	翻滾吧！蛋炒飯	Rolling Love	2nd Male lead	Leng Lie (冷冽)
2009	Youku	愛戀狂潮	Crossing Love	Supporting role	Li Da Zheng (李達正)
2009	GTV	我用音樂說愛你	I Use Music to Say I Love You	Male lead	Jiang Ming Hao (江明皓)
2011	CTS	拜金女王	Material Queen	Supporting role	Li Hai (李海)
2013	SETTV	美味的想念	A Hint of You	2nd Male lead	Du Huai An (杜懷安)
2013	Next TV / TTV	幸福的蒲公英	Blissful Dandelion/Happy Dandelion	Male lead	Song Li Xing (宋力行)
2014	SETTV	女人30情定水舞間	Fabulous 30	Male lead	Edward Ai De Hua (艾德华)
2015	SETTV	莫非，這就是愛情	Murphy's Law of Love	Male lead	Ji Jia-wei (紀家尉)
2015	HKTV	還來得及再愛你	Love in Time	Male lead	Roy
2015	Liaoning TV	戀上黑天使(真愛追擊)	Love Actually (Love You, Love Me)	Male lead	Ma Liang (馬梁)
2016	Hunan TV	尋找愛的冒險	The Adventure for Love	2nd Male lead	Xia Meng Long (夏夢龍)
2017	Hunan TV	我們的少年時代	Boyhood	2nd Male lead	Bai Zhou (白舟)
2019	Jiangsu TV	山月不知心底事	Love Under the Moon / Being Lonely in Love	2nd Male lead	Shen Ju An

=== Movies ===
Year	Chinese title	English title	Role
2010	鎧甲勇士之帝皇俠	Armor Hero Emperor	Zi Yang (子陽)
2012	午夜微博	Midnight Microblog	
2017		Almost Perfect: Love Actually	
2017		West River	
2019		Meta Area	

== Discography ==
=== Studio ===
#	English title	Chinese title	Released	Label
1st	Love Me	愛我	17 August 2007	Avex Taiwan
2nd	D's New Attraction	D新引力	16 January 2009	Avex Taiwan
3rd	The First Second	D1秒	24 June 2010	Avex Taiwan
4th	Towards Tomorrow's Journey	開往明天的旅行	26 April 2011	Avex Taiwan

=== Compilation ===
#	English title	Chinese title	Released	Label
1st	Towards Tomorrow's Journey	開往明天的旅行	26 April 2011	Avex Taiwan

=== Soundtrack contributions ===
Year	Album Information	Tracks Contributed
2007	The X-Family Original Soundtrack (終極一家 電視原聲帶)	"最愛還是你" Zuì Ài Hái Shì Nǐ (Still Love You the Most) – ep 1 to 30 ending theme – also released in Love Me
2008	Rolling Love (翻滾吧！蛋炒飯)	"告訴我" Gào Su Wǒ (Tell Me) – insert song – released in D's New Attraction

=== Music videos appearances ===
*Self MV's

Year	Song title	Details	Video
2007	Still Love You the Most (ver. 1) (最愛還是你 (冬、夏季版))	Album: Love Me (愛我)	Video on YouTube
2007	Still Love You the Most (ver. 2) (最愛還是你)	Album: Love Me (愛我)	Video on YouTube
2007	Love Me (愛我)	Album: Love Me (愛我)	Video on YouTube
2007	After The Breakup (分開以後)	Album: Love Me (愛我)	Video on YouTube
2007	Airplane (造飛機)	Album: Love Me (愛我)	Video on YouTube
2007	The Gun (回馬槍)	Album: Love Me (愛我)	Video on YouTube
2009	Intelligence (情報)	Album: D's New Attraction (D新引力)	Video on YouTube
2009	New Song (新歌)	Album: D's New Attraction (D新引力)	Video on YouTube
2009	Most Gentle Suspense (最溫柔的懸念)	Album: D's New Attraction (D新引力)	Video on YouTube
2009	Kiss Me Now	Album: D's New Attraction (D新引力)	Video on YouTube
2009	Reluctant To Let Go (捨不得放手)	Album: D's New Attraction (D新引力)	Video on YouTube
2010	I'm Back ft. f(x) Amber	Album: The First Second (D1秒)	Video on YouTube
2010	Grey Canel (灰色河堤)	Album: The First Second (D1秒)	Video on YouTube
2010	Be With You	Album: The First Second (D1秒)	Video on YouTube
2010	Let Go of Yourself (放過你自己吧)	Album: The First Second (D1秒)	Video on YouTube
2010	Accompany You (陪你)	Album: The First Second (D1秒)	Video on YouTube
2011	Towards Tomorrow's Journey (開往明天的旅行)	Album: Towards Tomorrow's Journey (開往明天的旅行)	Video on YouTube

*Other artistes MV's

Year	Song title	Details	Video
2005	DaDaDa	Singer(s): Cyndi Wang (王心凌); Album: Shining 2005 (閃耀2005)	Video on YouTube
2005	Anniversary (紀念)	Singer(s): Vangie Tang (鄧穎芝); Album: V2	Video on YouTube
2005	Starlight Amusement Park (星光遊樂園)	Singer(s): Twins; Album: Trainee Cupid (見習愛神)	Video on YouTube
2006	I Really Want to Love Him (我很想爱他)	Singer(s): Twins; Album: Around the World with 80 Dollars (80块环游世界)	Video on YouTube
2007	Good Tears Bad Tears (好眼淚壞眼淚)	Singer(s): Vivian Hsu (徐若瑄); Album: Love Vivian	Video on YouTube
2009	Love Choice (戀愛絕句選)	Singer(s): Huang Yali (黃雅莉); Album: I Shall Not Fear (雅莉不怕)	Video on YouTube

== Books ==
- 4 December 2007: Tang Tang Photo Novel Tang Yu Zhe Ying Zi Shu (唐禹哲影字書) – ISBN 978-986-124-976-6
- 15 April 2008: Tang Tang Photo and Writing Collection (D調型男：唐禹哲寫真文字集) – ISBN 978-957-803-689-5
- 8 December 2010: DisPLAY Tang TANG (曝光唐禹哲) – ISBN 978-986-6175-12-1
- 21 March 2012: In the Land of the Sacred and Love Tang Tang(在那神聖與愛的國度 唐禹哲) – ISBN 978-986-6175-65-7

== Awards and nominations ==
Year	Award	Category	Nomination	Result	Ref
2007	Metro Radio Hit Awards	Best Overseas New Artist	Tang Tang	Won	
2007	Metro Radio Hit Awards	Best New Artist (popular vote)	Tang Tang	Won	
2008	Metro Radio Mandarin Music Awards	Songs of the Year	"分開以後" (After The Breakup) from Love Me	Won	
2008	Metro Radio Mandarin Music Awards	Best Improved Singer (躍進歌手)	Tang Tang	Won	
2009	2009 Modern Shanghai Awards; 2009摩登上海精彩在沃年度大賞	Trend Setter Award (潮流先鋒獎)	Tang Tang	Won	
