= 1986 (Portuguese TV series) =

- Genre: Comedy
- Created by: Ana Markl; Filipe Homem Fonseca; Joana Stichini Vilela; Nuno Markl
- Country of origin: Portugal
- No. of seasons: 1
- No. of episodes: 13

Production
- Producer: Henrique Oliveira
- Production company: Hop!

Original release
- Network: RTP1
- Release: March 13 – June 19, 2018

1986 is a Portuguese television series by RTP and produced by Hop!.

The series will portray, in a dramatic comedy record and from the point of view of high school adolescent students, their parents and teachers, one of the most striking moments of Portuguese democracy: the 1986 presidential election second round disputed between Diogo Freitas do Amaral and Mário Soares.
