= 4U (album) =

Studio album by Elva Hsiao
- Released: 11 February 2002
- Genre: Mandopop
- Language: Chinese
- Label: Virgin

Elva Hsiao chronology
Tomorrow (2001)	4U (2002)	Theme Song of Love, Kissing (2002)

4U is the fourth studio album by Taiwanese singer Elva Hsiao (simplified Chinese: 萧亚轩; traditional Chinese: 蕭亞軒), released on 11 February 2002 by Virgin Records Taiwan.

== Track listing ==
1. "愛你不要距離" (No Distance in Love)
2. "問自己" (Ask Yourself)
3. "我喜歡你快樂" (Like You Happy)
4. "快歌" (Fast Song)
5. "靠近一點" (Come Closer)
6. "自己人" (Personal)
7. "我們的寂寞" (Our Loneliness)
8. "笑著愛你" (Smiling Love You)
9. "因為你" (Because of You)
10. "插曲" (Insert Song)
11. "And I Know" (Remix)
