= 1986 (album) =

- 1986 cover

Studio album by Genie Chuo
- Released: 27 July 2001
- Genre: Mandopop
- Language: Mandarin
- Label: Rock Records

Genie Chuo chronology
1986 (2001)	Be Used To (2006)

1986 is Taiwanese Mandopop artist Genie Chuo's (Chinese: 卓文萱) debut Mandarin studio album. It was released on 27 July 2001 by Rock Records. It is available with a power CD. Chuo debuted with this album at 15 years of age and there was a hiatus of 5 years, with the exception of a few soundtrack contributions, before her second album Be Used To (Chinese: 習慣) in 2006.

== Track listing ==
1. Introduction
2. "C.P.Z" (Crazy Party Zoo)
3. Interlude 1
4. "我怎麼知道" (How Do You Know) – China Television (CTV) Ikkyū (一修和尚) ending theme
5. Interlude 2
6. "我做不到" (I Can't Do It)
7. Interlude 3
8. "Hala"
9. Interlude 4
10. "怎麼辦" (What To Do)
11. "想家" (Homesick)
12. Interlude 5
13. "感受" (Feeling)
14. "我喜歡這樣的愛" (Like This Love)
15. Interlude 6
16. "I L U"
17. Interlude 7
18. "Goodbye"

Power CD

1. Summer Genie's card
2. Magic school grounds
3. Genie's talk
4. Welcome to Genie's world
