= Genie Chuo =

Taiwanese singer and actress

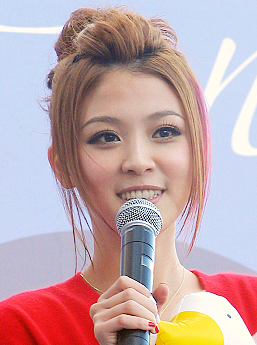
- Chuo in 2010
- Born: 20 January 1986 (age 40); New Taipei, Taiwan
- Other names: Genie Zhuo; Zhuo Wenxuan; Chuo Wen-hsuan
- Occupations: Singer, actress, television host
- Years active: 2001–present

Chinese name
- Chinese: 卓文萱
- Hanyu Pinyin: Zhuó Wénxuān
- Wade–Giles: Cho Wen-hsüan
- Musical career
- Genres: Mandopop
- Label: Rock Records

Genie Chuo (Chinese: 卓文萱; pinyin: Zhuó Wénxuān; born 20 January 1986) is a Taiwanese singer, actress and television host.

== Life and career ==
Chuo won several karaoke competitions when she was a first year in the Taipei County Fuho Junior High School. Chuo was scouted during one of the competitions and became a stand-in singer for Supachaya "Bell" Lattisophonkul of China Dolls for their first Chinese album, in which the producer stated that Chuo's vocals was used to correct Bell's weak enunciation of Chinese words. After a number of lessons and training for singing, she debuted as a singer.

She attended Hua Kang Art School where she briefly dated Alien Huang during her first year. After graduating from high school, she continued recording, and has been active in television series in Taiwan including the 2007 drama, Romantic Princess and 2006 Taiwanese movie, Do Over (一年之初).

In 2010, Chuo sang the theme song for the theatrical drama Summer Snow directed by Golden Horse Awards winner Lee Hsing (李行). The EP was released on 30 July 2010 with proceeds going to the Red Cross.

== Discography ==
=== Studio albums ===
Album#	English title	Original title	Released	Label
1st	1986	1986	27 July 2001	Rock Records
2nd	Be Used To	習慣	27 October 2006	Rock Records
3rd	Oxygenie of Happiness	幸福氧氣	26 October 2007	Rock Records
4th	My Favorite Kind of Geniie	超級喜歡	7 November 2008	Rock Records
5th	Just The Way I Am	反正 卓文萱	4 November 2011	Rock Records
6th	Burning Sense of Music	灼樂感	16 October 2014	Rock Records

=== Compilation albums ===
Album#	English title	Original title	Released	Label
1st	1 + 1 Play n Fun (New Song + Collection)	1+1 Play n Fun 珍選集	6 November 2009	Rock Records

=== Soundtrack contribution ===
Year	English title (Chinese title)	Track listing
2004	Lover of Herb Original Soundtrack (香草戀人館電視原聲帶)	"香草戀人" (Lover of Herb); "有星星的夜" (Starry Night)
2005	Holiday Dreaming Original Soundtrack (夢遊夏威夷電影原聲帶)	"怎麼知道你愛" (Don't Know You Loved)
2006	Love Queen (戀愛女王 電影原聲帶)	"Super No. 1" – Opening Theme; "梁山伯與茱麗葉" (Liang Shan Bo and Juliet) feat Gary Cao – Ending Theme
2008	Rolling Love Original Soundtrack (翻滾吧！蛋炒飯 電視原聲帶)	永不消失的彩虹" [Never Ending Rainbow] – Ending Theme; "LALALA愛情密碼" [La La La Love Code]; "愛情魔法衣" [Love's Magic Coat]; "瘋了瘋了" [Going Mad]
2010	Summer Snow Theatrical Drama Theme Song EP (夏雪舞台劇主題曲 EP)	1. "夏雪" (Summer Snow); 2. "夏雪MMO" (Summer Snow MMO)

=== Collaboration ===
Song and Music video: 2007 Alien Huang & Genie Chuo – "愛的主旋律" [The Melody of Love]
Song and Music video: 2013/2014 Alien Huang & Genie Chuo – "心愛的" [Beloved]

== Filmography ==
=== Television ===
Year	English title	Original title	Role	Network	Notes
2006	Engagement for Love	愛情經紀約	Zhu Kexin	TTV	
2006	Love Queen	戀愛女王	Yu Qiaole	CTS	
2007	Romantic Princess	公主小妹	Gong Moli	CTV	
2007	Mean Girl Ah Chu	惡女阿楚	Wang Zhier	CTS	
2007	The Teen Age	18禁不禁	Zhu Yixuan	CTV	
2008	Rolling Love	翻滾吧！蛋炒飯	Guan Xiaoshu	CTV	
2010	The Love River	藍海一加一	He Zhenai	HiHD	
2011	Boys and Girls	男女生了沒	Hei Younan	CTV	
2011	Soldier	勇士們	Xu Yushu	TTV	
2012	Say That You Love Me	爱情是从告白开始的	Chi Zao Zao		
2014	GTO In Taiwan		Xie Li	Fuji TV Kansai TV	

=== Film ===
Year	English title	Original title	Role	Notes
2002	Forever of Forever	永遠永遠永遠的永夜	Xuan Xuan	
2006	Do Over	一年之初	Toll Station Girl	
2013	Love Transplantation	幸福快遞	Sun I-Jung	
2018	Love Story in College	兵荒馬亂的愛情	Mo Luan	
2019	It's a Mad, Mad, Mad, Mad Show	瘋狂電視台瘋電影	Chung Lin	

== Awards and nominations ==
Year	Award	Category	Nominated work	Result	Ref.
2009	Metro Radio Mandarin Music Awards	Best New Artists	Genie Zhuo	Won	
2010	Metro Radio Mandarin Music Awards	Songs of the Year	"1 + 1" from 1 + 1 Play n Fun	Won	
2010	Metro Radio Mandarin Music Awards	Best Improved Singer (力躍進歌手)	Genie Zhuo	Won	
2022	57th Golden Bell Awards	Best Host in a Variety Show	Stylish Man - The Chef	Nominated	
