= Maggie Chiang =

Taiwanese singer and songwriter

Maggie Chiang Mei-chi
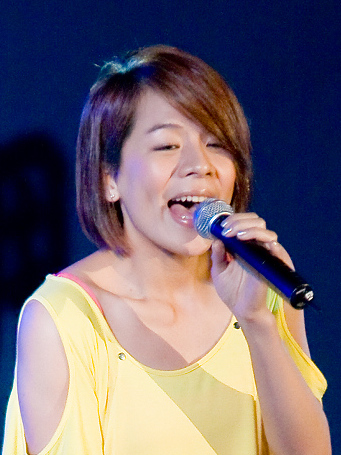
- Chiang at the 2010 Dayeh University Graduation Concert
- Born: 14 August 1980 (age 46); Zhongli, Taoyuan County, Taiwan (now Zhongli District, Taoyuan City)
- Education: Fudan Senior High School
- Occupations: Singer; songwriter; actress
- Years active: 1999–present
- Musical career
- Also known as: Melody Chiang
- Genres: Mandopop
- Instrument: Vocals
- Labels: Virgin Music (EMI) (1999–2005); Seed Music (2006–2008); XY Music (2010–2016); Sony Music Taiwan (2017–2021); Warner Music (2022–present)

Maggie Chiang Mei-chi (Chinese: 江美琪; pinyin: Jiāng měiqí) is a Taiwanese singer and songwriter. She is dubbed a "therapeutic singer" (療傷系歌手) by the Chinese-language media for her heartfelt delivery of ballads.

== Discography ==
=== Studio albums ===
- 1999: I Love Faye Wong (我愛王菲)
- 1999: Love at Second Sight (第二眼美女)
- 2000: Whispering Words (悄悄話)
- 2001: Remembrance (想起)
- 2002: Once Again (再一次也好)
- 2003: Melody (美樂地)
- 2003: Friend of a Friend (朋友的朋友)
- 2005: Lover's Poem (戀人心中有一首詩)
- 2006: Crybaby (愛哭鬼)
- 2012: My Room (房間)
- 2017: Dear World (親愛的世界)
- 2018: As Long, As Life (我們都是有歌的人)

=== Compilation albums ===
- 2004: Beautiful But Lonely (又寂寞又美麗)

=== Extended plays ===
- 2010: The Weight of Love (愛情的重量)

=== Singles ===
- 2010: "Under the Moonlight" (月光下)
- 2010: "You Do Love Me" (你是愛我的)
- 2018: "Spinner" (陀螺)
- 2018: "Treasure" (家珍)

== Filmography ==
- Where's the Dragon? (2015)

== Awards and nominations ==
Year	Award	Category	Nomination	Result
1998	11th Golden Melody Awards	Best New Artist	I Love Faye Wong	Nominated
2005	16th Golden Melody Awards	Best Music Video Director	張時霖 / The 101st Answer	Won
