= Shut Up and Kiss Me (Elva Hsiao album) =

- Standard cover

Studio album by Elva Hsiao
- Released: August 22, 2014
- Recorded: 2014
- Genre: Dance-pop; electronic
- Length: 44:43
- Language: Chinese
- Label: Sony Music Taiwan

Elva Hsiao chronology
I'm Ready (2011)	Shut Up and Kiss Me (2014)	Naked Truth (2020)

Alternative cover

Singles from Shut Up and Kiss Me
- 1. "Shut Up and Kiss Me" Released: July 23, 2014; 2. "Romance Strikes" Released: August 22, 2014

Shut Up and Kiss Me (Chinese: 不解釋親吻; pinyin: Bù jiěshì qīnwěn; lit. 'Kiss without explanation') is the thirteenth studio album by Taiwanese recording artist Elva Hsiao, released on August 22, 2014, by Sony Music Taiwan. The album produced the singles "Shut Up and Kiss Me" and "Romance Strikes".

== Singles ==
The titular single "Shut Up and Kiss Me" premiered on radio stations in Asia and Chinese radio stations in Canada on July 23, 2014. The production for its music video cost NT$5 million.

== Commercial performance ==
Shut Up and Kiss Me peaked at number one on the Taiwanese G-Music album chart.

== Track listing ==
Shut Up and Kiss Me – Standard edition
No.	Title	Length
1.	"Shut Up and Kiss Me" (不解釋親吻; Bu Jie Shi Qin Wen)	4:07
2.	"Romance Strikes" (浪漫來襲; Lang Man Lai Xi)	4:11
3.	"Dare to Love" (敢傷; Gan Shang)	4:11
4.	"Surviving" (劫後餘生; Jie Hou Yu Sheng)	4:17
5.	"Good For Anyone" (對誰都好; Dui Shui Dou Hao)	4:32
6.	"Love Detention" (留愛查看; Liu Ai Cha Kan)	3:51
7.	"Embrace Yourself" (擁抱自己; Yong Bao Zi Ji)	3:29
8.	"Trigger to the Thunder of Love" (天雷地火; Tian Lei Di Huo)	3:14
9.	"Love Like a Teen" (愛面前誰都17歲; Ai Mian Qian Shui Dou 17 Sui)	3:23
10.	"Suffocating Love" (窒愛; Zhi Ai)	4:47
11.	"Remember to Smile" (記得要微笑; Ji De Yao Wei Xiao)	4:41
Total length:		44:43

== Charts ==
Chart performance for Shut Up and Kiss Me
Chart (2014)	Peak position
Taiwanese Albums (G-Music)	1

== Release history ==
Release history for Shut Up and Kiss Me
Region	Date	Format(s)	Edition	Label
Taiwan	August 22, 2014	CD; digital download; streaming	Standard	Sony Music Taiwan
Taiwan	August 22, 2014	CD	No Explanation edition	Sony Music Taiwan
Taiwan	August 22, 2014	CD	Kiss edition	Sony Music Taiwan
Taiwan	September 19, 2014	CD	Romance edition	Sony Music Taiwan
