= Elva Hsiao =

Taiwanese singer (born 1979)

- 蕭亞軒
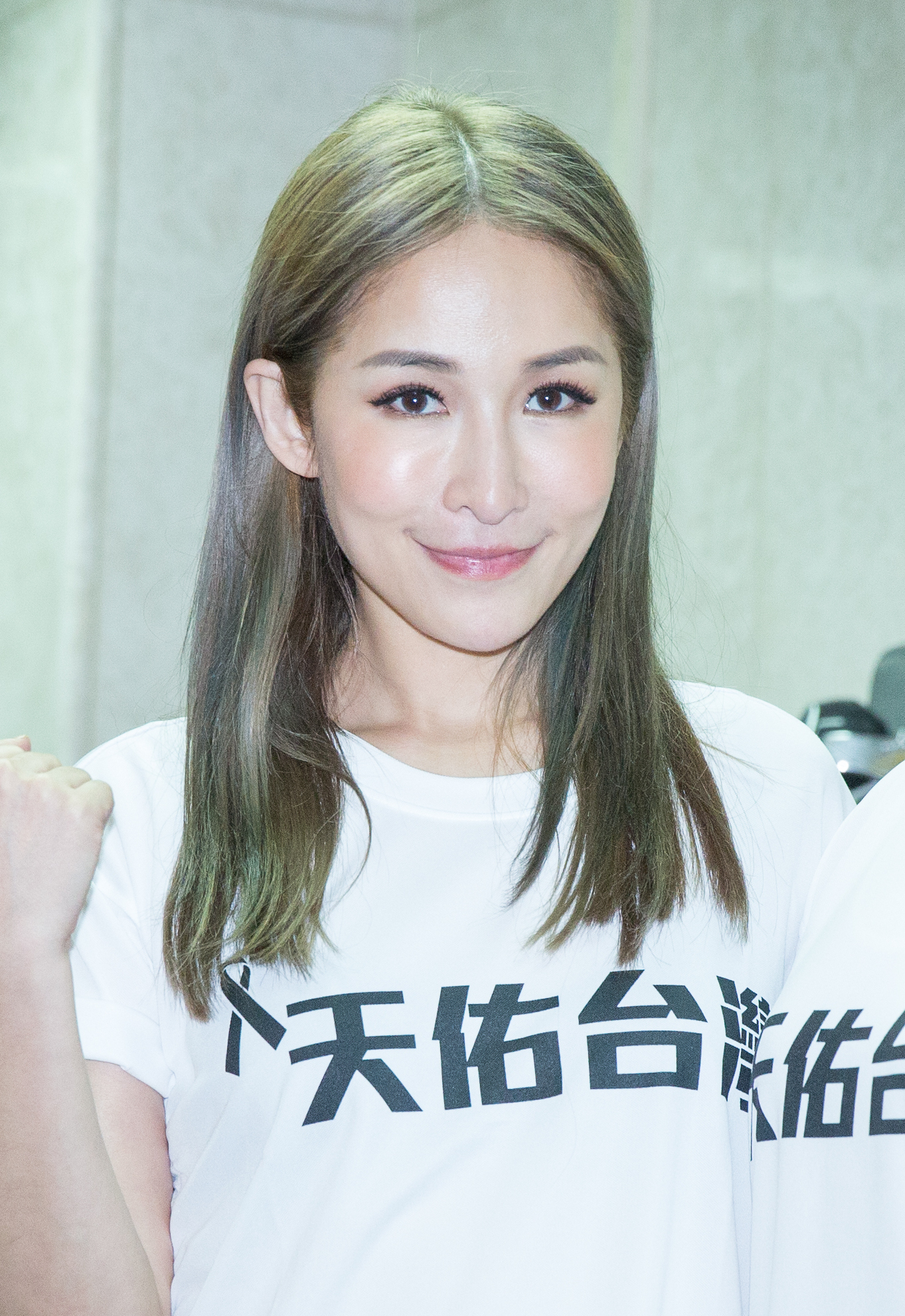
- Hsiao in 2014
- Born: Hsiao Ya-chih; 24 August 1979 (age 47); Zhongli, Taoyuan, Taiwan
- Education: Fu-Hsin Trade & Arts School
- Occupations: Singer; songwriter; dancer; actress; businesswoman
- Years active: 1999–present
- Musical career
- Genres: Mandopop; pop; R&B; dance
- Instrument: Vocals
- Labels: EMI; Virgin; Warner; Gold Typhoon; Sony

Chinese name
- Traditional Chinese: 蕭亞軒
- Simplified Chinese: 萧亚轩
Transcriptions
Standard Mandarin
- Hanyu Pinyin: Xiāo Yàxuān
- Wade–Giles: Hsiao^{1} Ya^{3}-hsüan^{1}

Birth name
- Traditional Chinese: 蕭雅之
- Simplified Chinese: 萧雅之
Transcriptions
Standard Mandarin
- Hanyu Pinyin: Xiāo Yǎzhī
- Wade–Giles: Hsiao^{1} Ya^{3}-chih^{1}

Elva Hsiao (traditional Chinese: 蕭亞軒; simplified Chinese: 萧亚轩; pinyin: Xiāo Yǎxuān, born 24 August 1979) is a Taiwanese singer. Having gained widespread popularity for her R&B-influenced ballads, she is recognized as one of the "Four Little Divas" of Mandopop.

== Life and career ==
=== 1979–1998: Early life and career beginnings ===
Hsiao was born on 24 August 1979, in Zhongli District, Taoyuan, Taiwan. She signed to EMI Virgin Records in 1998, as their first artist, after being scouted from the singing competition New Talent Singing Awards, affiliated with Hong Kong TV channel TVB. She was one of twelve finalists. Singers Jacky Chu and Ruby Lu also competed that year.

Hsiao was part of a girl group called Phenomenon initially, but pursued a solo career after her bandmates dropped out. She was studying design in Vancouver, Canada, at John Casablancas Institute, at the time. After signing, Hsiao was managed and groomed by songwriter Yao Chien, who was also the president of Virgin/EMI in Taiwan at the time. Yao would also have a hand in writing for many of Hsiao's albums released under Virgin/EMI.

=== 1999–2001: Debut and commercial breakthrough ===
Hsiao's first album was self-titled and was of the pop and R&B genre. The album was released in 1999 and was considered a pioneer for the R&B genre in Chinese-speaking markets. The album was a commercial success, selling a total 800,000 copies in Asia the following year. The success of the album paved the way for her first solo concert in Taipei later in 2000. The single, "Cappuccino", became popular in Chinese karaoke settings. Hsiao was also tapped to record the jingle for the re-branding effort by the Broadcasting Corporation of China in Taiwan.

For Hsiao's third album, Tomorrow, Virgin/EMI made a push for the mainland Chinese market, capitalizing on the singer's name recognition in the Taiwanese and Hong Kong music markets. The album included hip hop influences and faster tempos than Hsiao's previous releases, as well as a song performed in Cantonese. Despite a limited schedule of just four concerts and press conferences in China and Hong Kong, the album would still go on to sell 400,000 copies in the mainland in addition to 290,000 records sold in Taiwan in 2001.

=== 2002–2005: Increased recognition and venture into acting ===
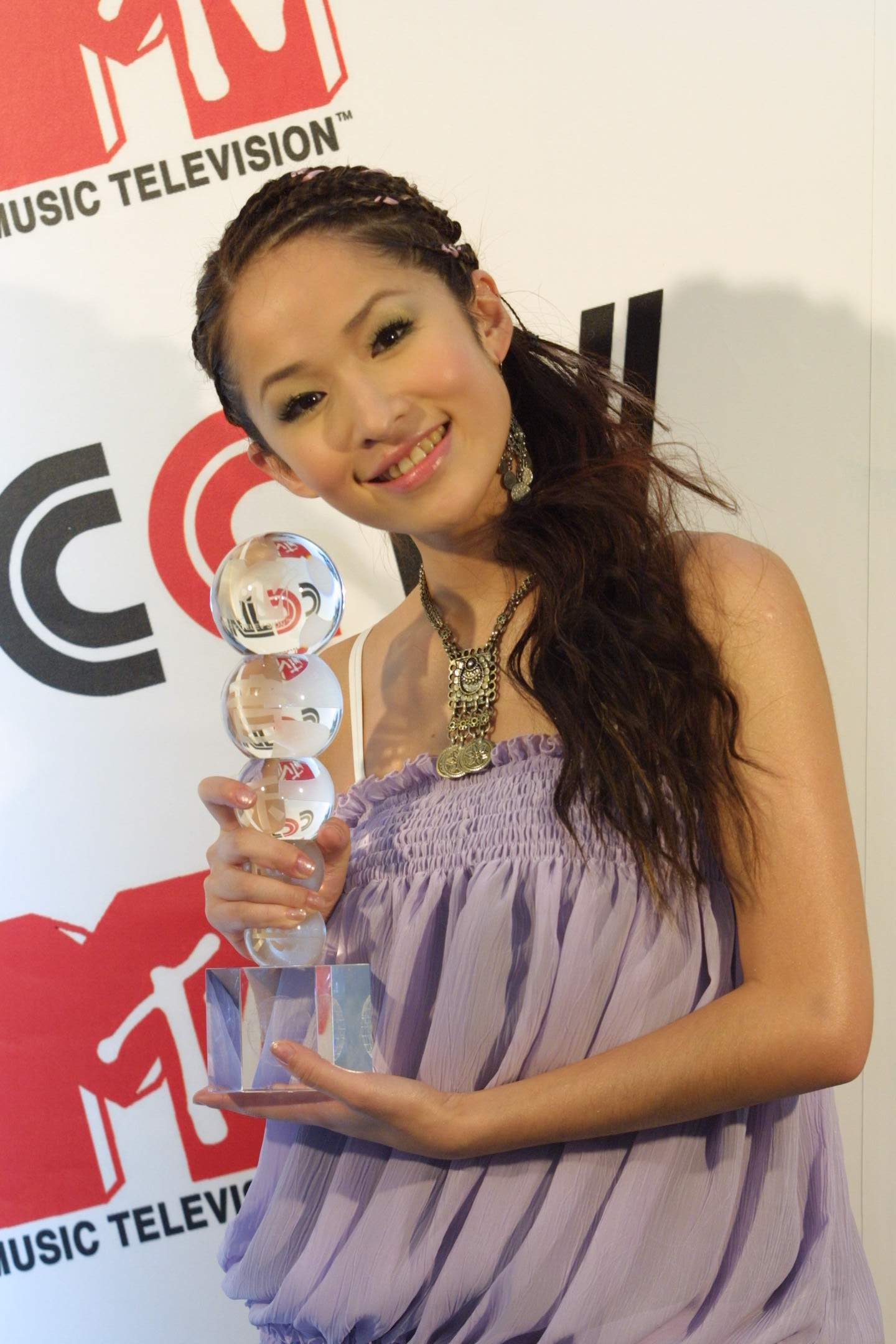
Hsiao at CCTV-MTV Music Awards in Beijing in July 2002.

Hsiao's next album, 4U, released in 2002, featured a song that Hsiao wrote the lyrics for. She collaborated with English boy band Blue that year on a remake of their song "U Make Me Wanna" for her album Theme Song of Love, Kissing. That album featured two songs in which Hsiao contributed to production. That same year, Hsiao made her feature film debut in the Hong Kong crime thriller, Infernal Affairs in a minor role as the ex-girlfriend of Tony Leung's character. The film was remade in the US as The Departed, which went on to win an Academy Award.

Hsiao would also lend her voice to the animated film The Butterfly Lovers, based on the classic Chinese fairytale of the same name in 2004. Two songs from Hsiao's next album, 5th Avenue, were also featured in soundtracks for a film and a television show. The singer's contract with Virgin/EMI ended in 2004 with the release of her greatest hits record Beautiful Episode. Despite a light marketing budget banking on Hsiao's public persona, the album sold well, with 400,000 copies moved in mainland China, becoming the biggest selling record for the label that year.

=== 2006–2012: Continued success ===
Elva Hsiao in 2008

Hsiao signed with Warner Music Taiwan but was only able to release her next album, 1087, in December 2006. The album was partly delayed because of an upheaval in staff at Warner and was named for the number of days between its release and Hsiao's previous studio album. Promotions for the album also experienced delays as the singer had to take five months to recover from tearing a ligament in her left leg while shooting a music video. Hsiao returned to EMI Music Taiwan in 2008 after releasing just one album with Warner, also reuniting her with former manager Yao Chien.

She released 3 Faced Elva that same year in June. The artist's subsequent album, Diamond Candy, was released under the Gold Typhoon label after it was announced in August that the company had bought EMI Music Taiwan. Her entire catalog would later appear under the Warner Music label after the latter bought Gold Typhoon's music interests in 2014. This album featured songs written by British songwriter Wayne Hector and one song, "Beautiful Encounter", from that album was later covered by Brazilian pop singer Wanessa. She embarked on a world tour on 31 December 2009. Hsiao ventured into more dance oriented music with the release of Miss Elva in 2010. She released another compilation album, Super Girl, in 2013, featuring a new duet with Chinese K-pop star Han Geng. Around this time, Hsiao also launched a fashion line called Carry Me.

=== 2013–2019: Shut Up and Kiss Me ===
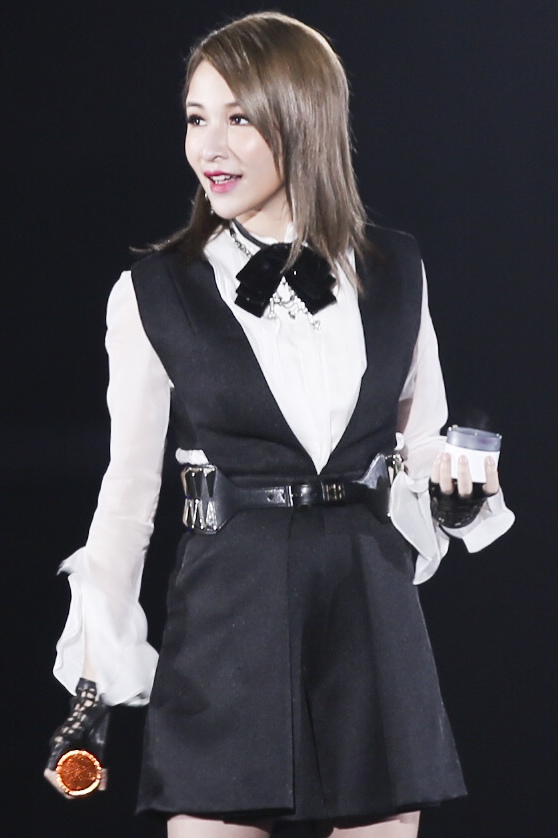
Hsiao performing in 2015

In 2013, Hsiao signed with Sony Music in the greater China region along with fellow Taiwanese pop star Show Luo. Hsiao released Shut Up and Kiss Me, which was preceded by a single of the same name. The music video for the single achieved 1 million views on YouTube after a day of release on the back of a NTD 4 million marketing blitz by Sony. A song from the same album was used as the main promotional song for The Amazing Spider-Man 2 in Taiwan.

Hsiao went on hiatus in August 2017, disappearing from the public eye for 18 months for undisclosed reasons, delaying the release of a new album that she had reportedly been preparing for three years. She was forced to cancel 13 tour dates scheduled for April 2018 in China as well. The singer broke her silence in August the following year to explain her absence, stating that she had suffered chest injuries in a fall, resulting in her being unable to sing due to difficulty breathing.

=== 2020–present: Naked Truth and comebacks ===
In November, Hsiao announced that she would be releasing a 10-song album, Naked Truth, in 2020 to coincide with her 20th year as a recording artist. The lead single, "In a Heartbeat", was released in 2019 and peaked at No. 2 on the Taiwanese KKBox chart. Hsiao also starred in the Chinese couple reality-show Meeting Mr. Right in late 2020, with her boyfriend at the time.

After making a surprise appearance at the 33rd Golden Melody Awards in July 2022, Hsiao confirmed that she was working on a new album. In August 2023, Hsiao signed with Warner Music China. At the press conference announcing the signing, she revealed that she had fractured her hip in 2022, which delayed preparations for her comeback. Hsiao continued to undergo surgeries and treatments for the injury over the next three years, including a hip replacement. She returned to the stage as a mentor on the Chinese singing show Let Me Sing in the summer of 2025.

== Awards ==
Year	Award	Category	Result	Ref.
2001	World Music Awards	Best Selling Chinese Artist	Won	

== Discography ==
Studio albums

- Elva First Album (1999)
- Red Rose (2000)
- Tomorrow (2001)
- Elva First (2001)
- 4U (2002)
- Theme Song of Love, Kissing (2002)
- In Love With Love (2003)
- 5th Avenue (2003)
- 1087 (2006)
- 3 Faced (2008)
- Diamond Candy (2009)
- Miss Elva (2010)
- I'm Ready (2011)
- Shut Up and Kiss Me (2014)
- Naked Truth (2020)
