= Ming Jie =

Taiwanese singer and actor

Brent Hsu
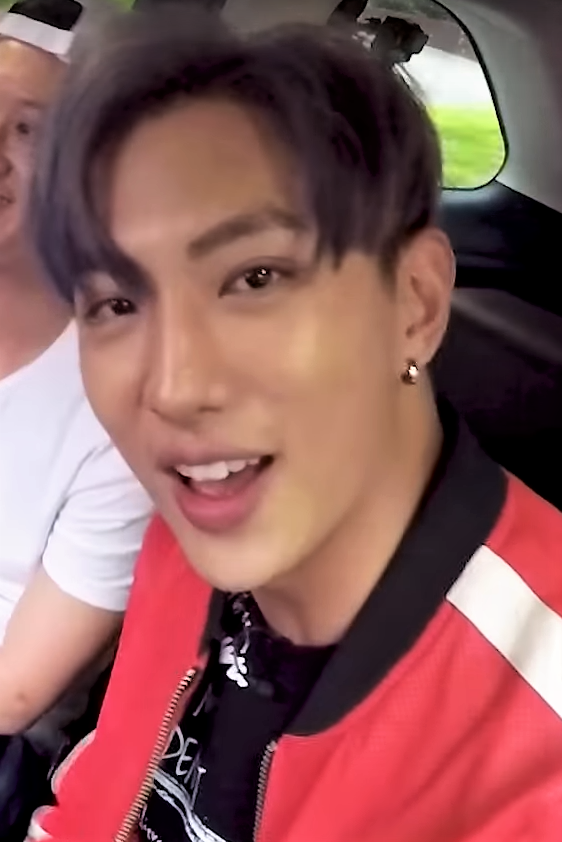
- Hsu in 2018
- Born: Hsu Ming-chieh; 12 May 1993 (age 33); Taipei, Taiwan
- Other names: Brent Hsu, Matthew
- Education: Taipei City University of Science and Technology (BS)
- Occupations: Actor; singer
- Years active: 2012–present
- Agent: Comic International Productions
- Height: 180 cm (5 ft 11 in)

Brent Hsu, born Hsu Ming-chieh (Chinese: 許明杰; pinyin: Xǔ Míng Jié; Pe̍h-ōe-jī: Khó͘ Bêng-kia̍t; born 12 May 1993), is a Taiwanese actor and singer. He was a member of the boyband SpeXial from 2012 to 2020.

== Biography ==
Hsu Ming-chieh was born in Taipei, Taiwan on 12 May 1993. His mother, Hsu Xianji, is an opera singer. He attended and graduated from Taipei City University of Science and Technology. Hsu debuted as a singer in 2012, after being scouted on the street with his friend Sam Lin, and became one of the four founding members of the boyband SpeXial, alongside Wes, Wayne, and Sam. Later that year, Huang debuted as an actor with a main role in the drama KO One Return. In the following years, he continued appearing in web series and movies, mostly with his bandmates.

In December 2014, Hsu temporarily left SpeXial in order to fulfill his mandatory military service. He was absent for the release of the group's first extended play, Love Killah, as well as the first SpeXial fan meeting at the National Taiwan University Sports Center.

He finished his military service on 10 December 2015 and rejoined the group on 24 January 2016, during the presentation of SpeXial at the KKBox Music Awards, where they performed the songs Love Guardian, Dangerous and Silly Girl, respectively. He is a big fan of singer Ian Broudie.

== Filmography ==
=== Television ===
Year	Title	Role	Notes
2012	KO One Return	Hua Linglong	Main role
2013	Fabulous Boys	Himself	Guest
2013	KO One Re-act	Hua Linglong	Main role
2014	The X Dormitory	Chen Wei / Ye Shen	Main role
2017	K.O. 3AN-GUO	Zhou Yu	Guest
2018	KO One Re-call	Bi Ling	Main role
2018	Fight For Fever	Yang Zijing	Main role
2018	Intern Doctor	Chen Tiancai	Main role
2018	Broken Net Moment	Xiong Wei	
2020	Proud of You	Yan Shengyuan	Main role
