= Wayne Huang =

Taiwanese singer and actor

- 黃偉晉
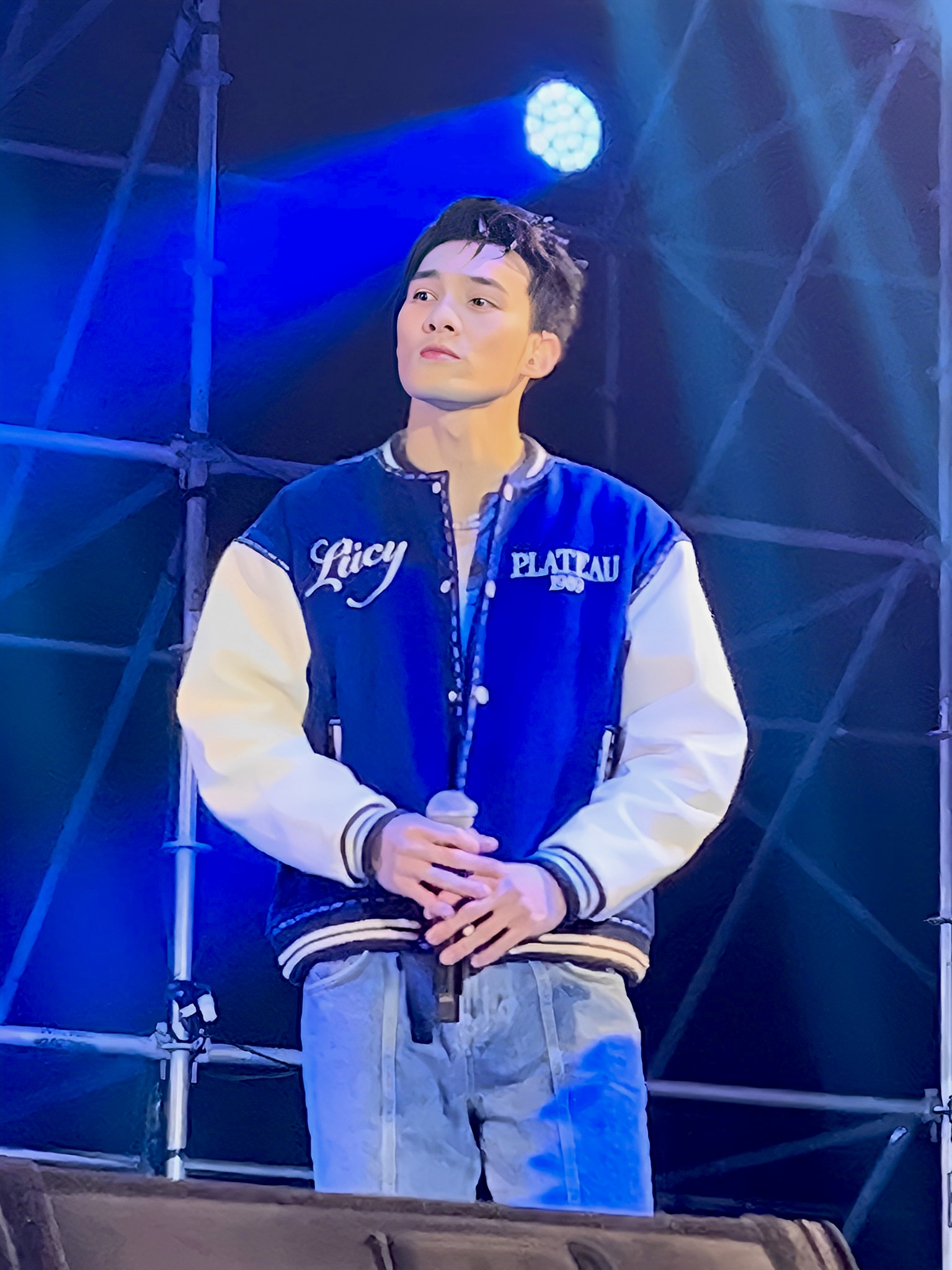
- Huang in 2023
- Born: Huang Weijin; March 23, 1990 (age 35); Shulin District, New Taipei City, Taiwan
- Education: Chihlee University of Technology (BS)
- Occupations: Actor; singer; dancer; host
- Years active: 2012–present
- Agent: Comic International Productions
- Height: 183 cm (6 ft 0 in)

Wayne Huang Weijin (Chinese: 黃偉晉; Pe̍h-ōe-jī: N̂g Úi-chìn, born March 23, 1990) is a Taiwanese actor, singer, dancer and host. He was a member of the boyband SpeXial from 2012 to 2019, and currently member of another Taiwanese band W0LF(S).

== Biography ==
Huang was born in Shulin District, New Taipei City on March 3, 1990. He is ethnically part Amis from his mother's side. Huang attended and graduated from Chihlee University of Technology. In 2009, he participated in Taiwanese TV singing contest One Million Star and was placed eighth. He debuted as a singer in 2012 as one of the four founding members of the boyband SpeXial, alongside Wes, Brent and Sam. Later that year, Huang debuted as an actor with a supporting role in the drama PM10-AM03. In the following years, he continued appearing in web series and movies, mostly with his bandmates.

On May 31, 2015, SpeXial won two Hito Music Awards. In 2016, the group became known in the Chinese market by acting in various series and web movies. In August, Huang starred in the popular web series Men with Sword, alongside bandmates Evan, Dylan, Zhiwei, Ian, Simon, and Win. On June 5, SpeXial again won two awards at the 2016 Hito Music Awards.

On March 23, 2018, Huang announced on his personal Facebook account that he was going to enlist in the army in order to fulfill his military service. His first solo concert took place on May 27 of the same year. He enlisted in the army on September 3, 2018 and came back on August 12, 2019. On September 19, 2019 Huang announced that he was going to leave SpeXial.

== Filmography ==
=== Television ===
Year	Title	Role	Notes
2012	PM10-AM03	Huang Hongwei	Minor role
2013	Fabulous Boys	Himself	Guest
2013	KO One Re-act	Zhi Ge	Guest
2014	The X-Dormitory	Ye Sheng	Minor role
2014	Angel 'N' Devil	Wang Dawei	Minor role
2015	Mr. Bodyguard	Han Bin / Xiao Hu	Main role
2015 - 2016	100% Entertainment	Himself	Substitute host
2016	Men with Sword	Yu Qing	Main role
2016	Global Chinese Music	Himself	Guest host
2016	KO One Re-member	Zhi Ge	Main role
2017	K.O. 3AN-GUO	Zhi Ge / Liu Bei	Main role
2017 - 2020	PS Play DNA	Himself	Host
2018	KO One Re-call	Zhi Ge	Main role
2018	Rock Soulmate	Chi Zhongxu	Main role
2018–present	100% Entertainment	Himself	Host
2021	Super Taste	Himself	Guest Host
2023	The 34th Golden Melody Awards 入圍就是肯定	Himself	Host (partnering Chen Ming Chu)
2024	2024 Super Star	Himself	Host (partnering Lulu, Sasa, Henry Hsu, Chen Ming Chu)

=== Movies ===
Year	Title	Role	Notes
2017	Super Firm	Nie Yincang	Main role
