= Simon Lian =

Taiwanese singer and actor

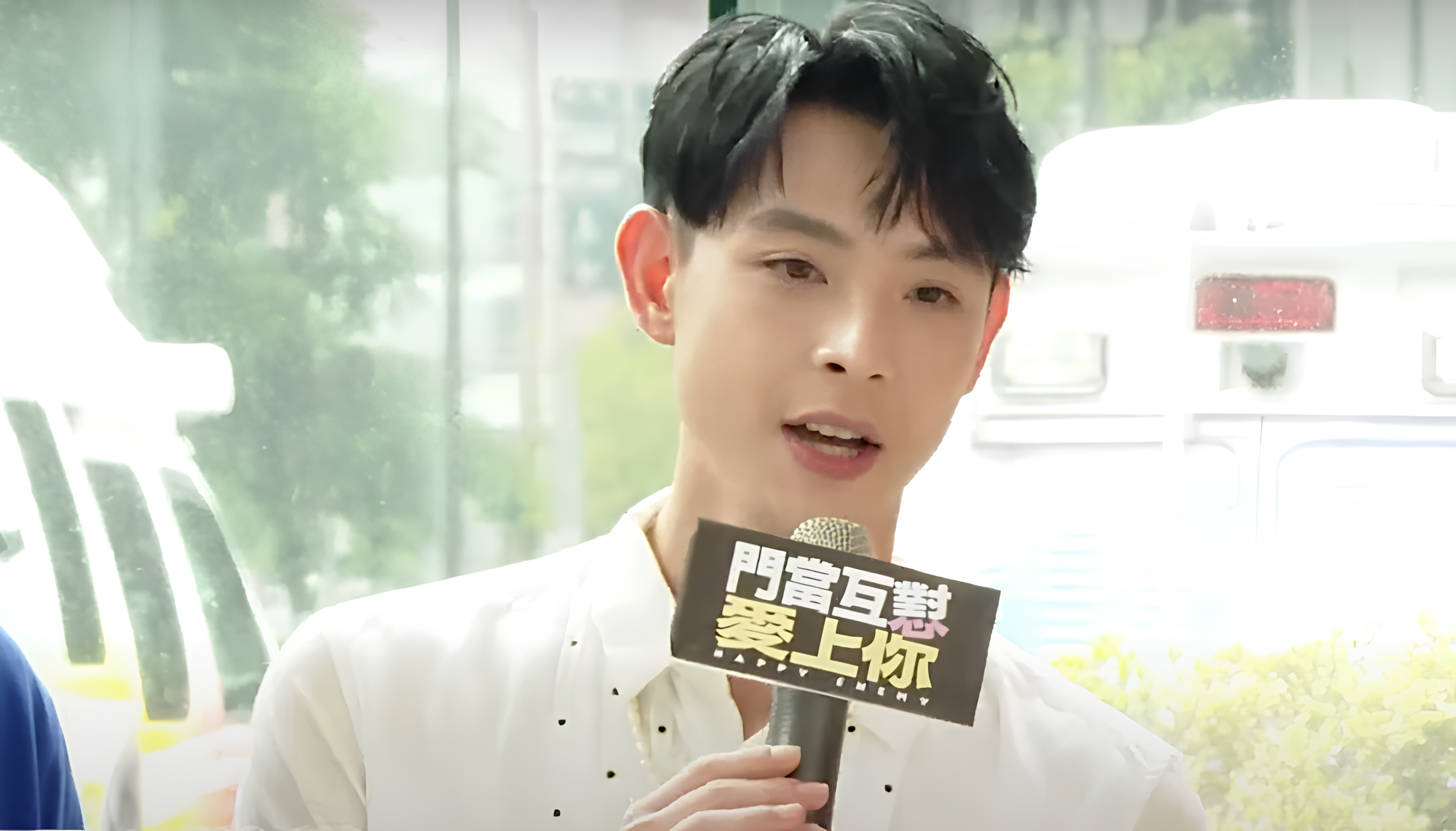
- Lian in 2022
- Born: Lien Chen-hsiang; January 3, 1992 (age 34); Shulin District, New Taipei City, Taiwan
- Other names: Simon
- Education: Ming Chuan University (BA)
- Occupations: Actor; singer
- Years active: 2014–present
- Agents: Warner Music Taiwan (2014–2017; 2019–present) Comic International Productions (2014–16) Mars Entertainment (2014–16); Top Fun Entertainment (2018–present)
- Height: 182 cm (6 ft 0 in)
- Spouse: Esther Liu (m. 2025)

Simon Lian Chen-hsiang (Chinese: 連晨翔; pinyin: Lián Chénxiáng; Pe̍h-ōe-jī: Liân Sîn-siông, born January 3, 1992), also known as Simon Lien or Lien Chen-hsiang, is a Taiwanese actor and singer. He was a member of the Taiwanese boyband SpeXial from 2014 to 2017.

== Biography ==
Lian Chenxiang was born in Shulin District, New Taipei City on January 3, 1992. He attended and graduated from Ming Chuan University with a degree in economics. On May 14, 2014, he became a member of the Taiwanese boyband SpeXial after being scouted while working in a clothing store. Lian debuted in SpeXial under its English name of "Simon" on June 5, during the press conference of the group's second album, Break It Down.

Along with several of his bandmates, he participated in the 2016 costume drama series Men with Sword. On November 4, 2016, he dropped his studies at the National Taiwan University of Arts in order to prepare for his mandatory military service. Lian continued working with the group until December 11, after a press conference for the series High 5 Basketball.

On January 25, 2017, he announced on his personal Facebook account that he had requested the termination of his contract with Comic International Productions due to "unclear accounts", and that he intended to leave SpeXial. He officially left the group on February 2, 2017. Lian was the first member to ever leave SpeXial, and was soon followed by bandmate Zhiwei, who left the group a month later, on March 23.

== Discography ==
=== EP ===
EP#	Details	Tracklist
1st	《CRAZY》: Released：December 6, 2019; Genre：Mandopop; Language: Mandarin; Label：Warner Music Taiwan; Format: CD, Digital download, streaming	1. You & Me; 2. Crazy Love
2nd	《A Hundred Percent (百分百)》: Released：November 27, 2020; Genre：Mandopop; Language: Mandarin; Label：Warner Music Taiwan; Format: CD, Digital download, streaming	1. Perfect Man (百分百男人); 2. Walk Away (走遠了); 3. TOO MUCH; 4. More than Friends (不只是朋友)

== Filmography ==
=== Film ===
Year	Title	Role	Notes
2021	Waiting for My Cup of Tea	Huang Zijie	Main role

=== Television ===
Year	Title	Role	Notes
2014	Angel 'N' Devil	Wang Charlie	Main role
2016	High 5 Basketball	Zhan Zhikai (James)	Main role
2018	Youth	Du Yaxiu	Main role
2019	The Teenage Psychic 2	Wang Jiejie	Cameo
2019	Someday Or One Day	Azhe	Cameo
2020	Lost Romance	Duanmu Qingfeng/Chen Qing	Main role
2020	The Legend of Xiao Chuo	Yelü Zhimo, King of Ning	Supporting role
2022	Happy Enemy	Li Yuxuan	Main role

=== Web series ===
Year	Title	Role	Notes
2014	Hold Live in Love	Evil Man	Guest (episode 9)
2014	GTO	Student	Guest
2014	The X-Dormitory		Guest (episode 40)
2014	Panic Syndrome No.3:44	Lian Chen-xiang	Guest
2016	Men with Sword	Qiu Zhen	Guest
