= Zhu Jian =

Zhu Jian may refer to:

- Zhu Youqian (died 926), warlord
- Zhu Jian (actor) (born 1991), Chinese actor and model
