= Lü Yunfeng =

Chinese actor

- Born: November 6, 1995 (age 30); Weifang, Shandong, China
- Other name: Lulu
- Education: Communication University of Zhejiang
- Occupation: Actor
- Years active: 2015–present
- Agent: Comic International Productions (2016-17)

Lü Yunfeng (Chinese: 呂鋆峰; pinyin: Lǚ Yúnfēng, born November 6, 1995) is a Chinese actor. He was affiliated to Comic Communication Co. between 2016 and 2017.

== Biography ==
He graduated from Communication University of Zhejiang and debuted as an actor in 2015 with a supporting role in the television series Long Distance, and officially entered the entertainment industry. In that same year, he acted as host of a meeting in China of the Taiwanese groups SpeXial and Angel 'N' Devil.

In 2016, he gained recognition acting as the melancholic king Ling Guang in the popular web series Men with Sword.

== Filmography ==
=== Web series ===
Year	Title	Role	Notes
2015	Long Distance	Zheng Hao	Secondary
2016	KO One Re-member	Xi-Xi	Secondary
2016	Men with Sword	Ling Guang	Main
2017	Men with Sword 2	Ling Guang	Main
2018	Like a Flowing River	Yang Su	Secondary
2019	Together	Doctor Shen	Secondary
2020	Jiu Gong Qi Ju	Liu Gui Yuan	Main
2020	Insect Totem	Ouyang Yanying	Secondary
2020	Like a Flowing River 2	Yang Su	Secondary
2021	Song of the Moon	Wan Sui	Secondary
2021	You Are My Glory	Xia Xue	Secondary

=== Movies ===
Year	Title	Role	Notes
2017	Love Strategy	Wang Xiaojian	Main
