= Evan Ma =

Canadian singer, rapper and actor

- Born: Ma Zhenhuan; November 2, 1992 (age 33); Taipei, Taiwan
- Other name: Evan
- Education: University of British Columbia (BA)
- Occupations: Actor; singer; rapper
- Years active: 2014–present
- Agent: Comic International Productions
- Height: 185 cm (6 ft 1 in)

Evan Ma (Chinese: 馬振桓; Pe̍h-ōe-jī: Má Chín-hoân, born November 2, 1992) is a Taiwanese-Canadian actor, singer and rapper. He was a member of the Taiwanese boyband SpeXial from 2014 to 2021.

== Biography ==
Ma Zhenhuan was born in Taipei, Taiwan, on November 2, 1992. His parents emigrated to Vancouver, Canada, when he was two and a half years old. In 2012, he won the Sunshine Nation contest. In 2013, he moved to Taipei after being recruited by the agency Comic International Productions, where he began to work as a musician.

On May 26, 2014, he joined the Taiwanese boy band SpeXial alongside two other new members. He debuted in SpeXial under its English name of "Evan" on June 5, during the press conference of the group's second album, Break It Down. In the group, he is one of the lead vocalists and rappers.

In August 2014, Ma returned to Canada in order to finish his studies at the University of British Columbia, where he graduated from the finance department. Due to this, he was absent during the recording and release of the band's first extended play, Love Killah, which was released on February 4, 2015. He rejoined SpeXial on May 31, 2015, during the Hito Music Awards ceremony. As an actor, he is best known for his roles in web series like Moon River, The Ultimate Ranger, Men with Sword, K.O.3an Guo and K.O. Re:Call.

== Filmography ==
=== Television ===
Year	Title	Role	Notes
2014	The X-Dormitory	Fighter	Guest (episode 40)
2015	Moon River	Feng Jianche	Co-protagonist
2018	Right Time to Right Person	Wen Cheng	

=== Web series ===
Year	Title	Role	Notes
2014	Hold: Live in Love	Young Man	Guest (episode 9)
2015	Happy Together	Wang Chengwen	Episodes 6, 14 y 15
2016	The Ultimate Ranger	Tong Yingjie (Jerry)	Co-protagonist
2016	Men with Sword	Jian Bin	Recurrent role (episodes 2–5, 8–9, 11–15, 19–27)
2017	K.O.3an Guo	Zhao Yun	Main
2018	KO One Re-call	Lan Siluo	Main
