= Cheng Feng-shih =

Taiwanese politician

- 鄭逢時

Personal details
- Born: 27 December 1941 (age 84) Shuangxi, Taihoku, Taiwan, Empire of Japan
- Party: Kuomintang
- Education: National Chengchi University (BA); Tunghai University (MPA)

Cheng Feng-shih (Chinese: 鄭逢時; pinyin: Zhèng Féngshí; born 27 December 1941) is a Taiwanese politician.

== Education ==
Cheng studied public relations at National Chengchi University, and later earned a master's degree in the subject at Tunghai University.

== Career ==
Cheng was elected to the Taipei County Council in 1968. He was subsequently elected to the National Assembly in 1972 and 1975. During his tenure as an assemblyman, Cheng chaired the presidium of the National Assembly. Between 1981 and 1993, Cheng sat on the Taiwan Provincial Council. Cheng was elected to his first term on the Legislative Yuan in 1995 with 3.28% of the vote, representing the multimember Taipei County district. He was subsequently placed on the Kuomintang party list and reelected twice via proportional representation. Until August 2000, Cheng was chairman of Taiwan Television, when he was succeeded by Lai Kuo-chou.

As a legislator, Cheng was also a member of the board of Kuang Wu Institute of Technology. While a member of the Legislative Yuan, Cheng led the Kuomintang legislative caucus, within the Kuomintang's Central Standing Committee, and was deputy director of the party's policy committee. He retained the policy committee position for some time after stepping down as a legislator.

During his third term on the Legislative Yuan, Cheng commented on Lee Teng-hui's past affiliation with the Chinese Communist Party, operations of the Overseas Chinese Affairs Commission, and the exchange of political donations and favors, among them the December 2002 election of Chu An-hsiung as speaker of the Kaohsiung City Council, which was linked with black gold politics.
