= Zhao Zhiwei =

Chinese singer and actor

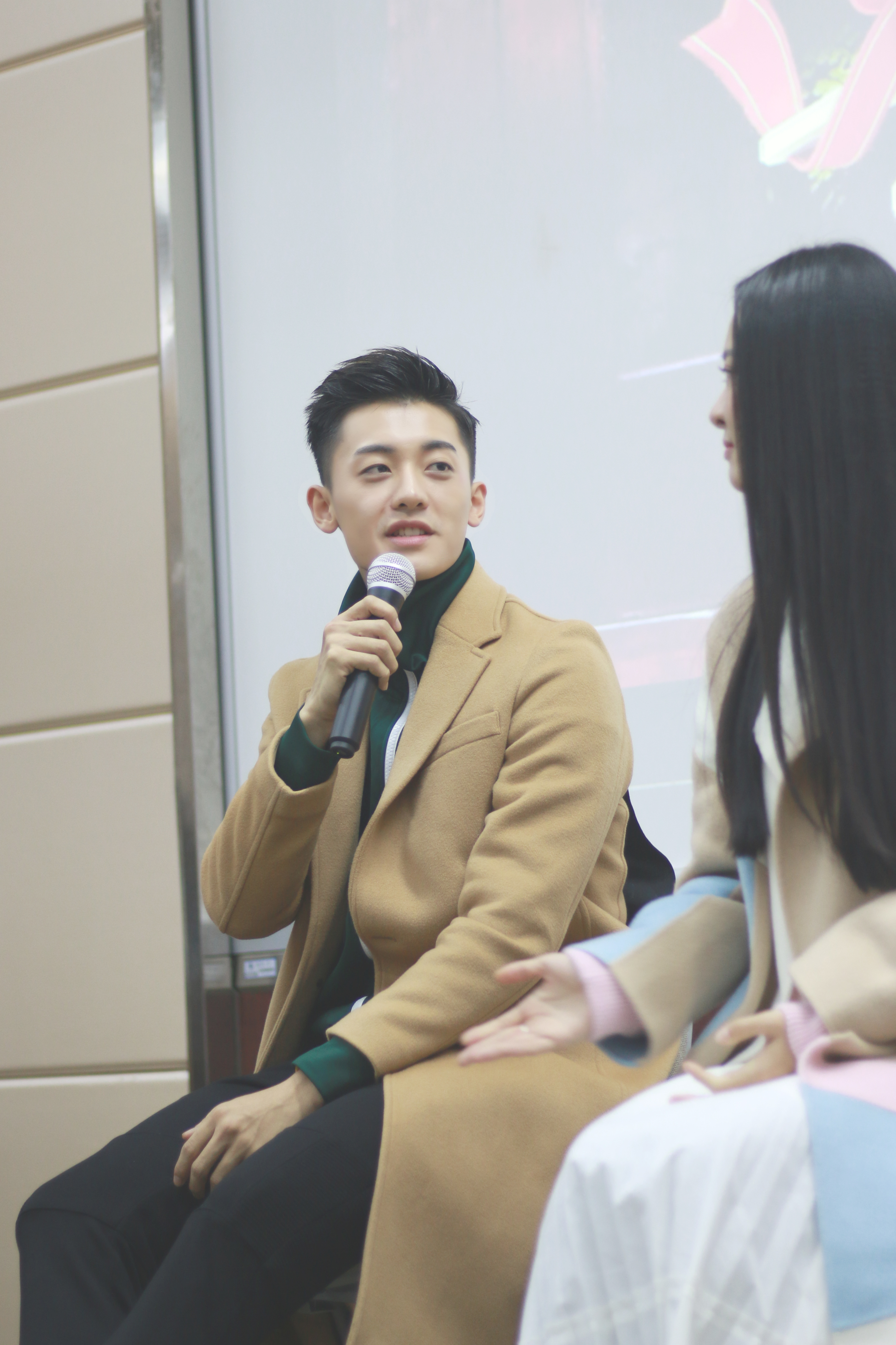
- Zhao in 2016
- Born: August 8, 1994 (age 32); Lanzhou, Gansu, China
- Other name: Eden Zhao
- Education: Shanghai Theater Academy
- Occupations: Actor; singer; dancer
- Years active: 2016–present
- Agent(s): Zhejiang Huace Film & TV (Huace Media)
- Height: 188 cm (6 ft 2 in)

Zhao Zhiwei (Chinese: 赵志伟; Chinese: 趙志偉; pinyin: Zhào Zhì Wěi, born August 8, 1994), also known as Eden Zhao, is a Chinese actor, singer and dancer. He was a member of the Taiwanese boyband SpeXial from 2016 to 2017.

== Biography ==
Zhao was born in Lanzhou, Gansu on August 8, 1994. He attended and graduated from Shanghai Theater Academy and performed as a dancer for ten years. Throughout the years, he participated in many national and international dance competitions, and has also acted as choreographer. Before graduating, the academy wanted Zhao to stay and serve as a teacher, but he was diagnosed with a serious knee injury that forced him to quit dancing. After that, he decided to become an actor and starred in his first television series, KO One Re-member, in 2016 and officially entered the entertainment industry.

On July 14 of the same year, Zhao became a member of the Taiwanese boyband SpeXial and participated in the recording of their 4th album, Boyz on Fire. Along with several of his bandmates, he participated in the costume drama series Men with Sword.

On March 20, 2017, Zhao announced that he was going to leave SpeXial for unspecified reasons. His departure took place three days later, on March 23, less than a year after joining the group. He was also the second member to leave SpeXial after his bandmate Simon, who left the group on February 2, 2017. Zhao signed with Huace Media following his departure to embark on his acting activities.

In 2019, Zhao starred in the romance web series Le Coup de Foudre, and Walk Into Your Memory.

== Filmography ==
=== Television series ===
Year	English title	Chinese title	Role	Notes
2016	KO One Re-member	终极一班4	Zhi	
2016	Men with Sword	刺客列传	Gongsun Qian	
2017	Fighter of the Destiny	择天记	Huo Guang	Guest appearance
2017	K.O.3an Guo	终极三国	Sun Ce	Guest appearance
2017	Take Your Mark	蔚蓝50米	Zhang Ruochen	
2018	Youth	最亲爱的你	Gao Lin	
2019	Le Coup de Foudre	我只喜欢你	Zhao Guanchao	
2019	Walk Into Your Memory	走进你的记忆	Long Haoqian	
2019	Please Love Me	拜托，请你爱我	Gu Chenyu	Cameo
2020	iPartment 5	爱情公寓2	Himself	Cameo
2020	Well Dominated Love	奈何Boss又如何	Yan Jingzhi	
2020	You Are So Sweet	你听起来很甜	Gu Chenyu	
2020	Hotel Interns	酒店实习生	Xie Fanyu	
2021	Two Conjectures About Marriage	婚姻的两种猜想	Chen Tonggang	
2022	Lighter and Princess	点燃我，温暖你	Gao Jianhong	

=== Film ===
Year	English title	Chinese title	Role	Notes
2018	Love Apartment	爱情公寓	Zhang Qiling	

=== Variety show ===
Year	English title	Chinese title	Role	Notes
2016	Grade One Graduation	一年级·毕业季	Cast member	

=== Theater ===
Year	English title	Chinese title	Role	Notes
2018	Just For Meeting You	我与世界只差一个你	Yang Yan	

== Discography ==
Year	English title	Chinese title	Album	Notes
2016	"Stars"	星辰	Grade One Graduation OST	
2016	"Finally One Day"	終有一天	Grade One Graduation OST	
2017	"Hero"	英雄	Men with Sword 2 OST	
2018	"Forever Not Far"	永远不远		
