= SpeXial =

Taiwanese boy band

- Origin: Taipei, Taiwan
- Genres: Mandopop
- Years active: 2012–2021
- Labels: Warner Music Group (2012-2016); Nut Music (2017-2021)
- Members: Win; Dylan
- Past members: Simon; Zhiwei; Riley; Wes; Wayne; Teddy; Brent; Sam; Evan; Ian
- Website: www.warnermusic.com.tw/spexial

SpeXial was a Taiwanese boy band formed by Comic International Productions in 2012. The group name is a combination of "eXtra" and "Special", which expressed the desire of the group to be unique. The group started off with four members and debuted on December 7, 2012 with their self-titled album, SpeXial. After several lineup changes, the group's final line-up consisted of only two members: Win and Dylan. Their fandom name is SXF (Chinese: 特使), which represents "Special Mission".

On May 21–22, 2016, SpeXial held their first major concert "SpeXial the 1st concert - SpeXial Land 2016" at Xinzhuang Gymnasium in New Taipei City, with a guest appearance by Pets Tseng.

== Career ==
=== 2012 to 2013: Debut ===
In 2012, Comic International Productions selected four boys whose average age was 20 years old and average height is 183 cm to form a new boy band named "SpeXial". The members included Wes (made his acting debut in Taiwanese Idol Drama K.O.3an Guo), Wayne (one of the top ten contestants of Taiwanese TV singing contest One Million Star (Season 6), Brent and Sam (made their acting debut in the television series KO One Return. Before releasing their first album, SpeXial received training in South Korea for a month.

On December 7, 2012, SpeXial debuted with their first self-titled Mandopop album, SpeXial. The album was funded by “2012 Funding the Production and Marketing of Outstanding Popular Music” of Bureau of Audiovisual and Music Industry Development. Also, SpeXial starred in Idol Drama KO One Return and performed the theme song and insert song.

In 2013, SpeXial starred in the sequel, KO One Re-act. They were invited by Executive Yuan for anti-drug campaign endorsement with Pets Tseng (who also starred in the sequel) because of their positive image in the drama.

=== 2014: Break It Down ===
On May 26, 2014, Comic International Productions announced the addition of three new members (increased to seven members), including Teddy (contestant of Shanghai Model Competition), Evan (Champion of 2012 Sunshine Nation – Sunshine Boyz) and Simon (scouted by the agency on the street). They officially debuted at the press conference of second Mandopop album Break it down on June 5, the album was released on June 12 and ranked No. 3 in Five Top Ranking (week 24 of year 2014) in the first week.

Also, Warner Music Taiwan spent 2 million TWD to create an online reality show Anything SpeXial, in order to introduce SpeXial in different aspects. The fourteen-episode show was released on May 27, 2014.

After starring in Idol Drama KO One Return and KO One Re-act and performing the theme songs, SpeXial took part in other dramas such as GTO in Taiwan, The X-Dormitory, Holding Love and Angel 'N' Devil, etc.

=== 2015: Love Killah and Dangerous ===
In the second half of 2014, Comic International Productions recruited three new members, including Riley (Taiwanese-Canadian), Win (Japanese) and Ian (the youngest member). They were then officially added to the group on January 13, 2015, so that SpeXial consisted of ten members.

SpeXial's first extended play Love Killah was released on February 4, 2015. Since Evan had to finish college in Canada from August 2014 and Brent started fulfilling military service from the end of December, 2014, only eight members participated in the recording. In the first week after the release of Love Killah, SpeXial held their first fan meeting at National Taiwan University Sports Center. On May 31, SpeXial won "hito Group" and "Most Popular Group" at 2015 hito Music Awards, which were their first two Taiwanese music awards. This event was Evan's comeback showcase, but Brent and Sam were absent at the ceremony as they were fulfilling military service.

In June 2015, SpeXial have been the endorser of a mobile game Junior Three Kingdoms, which was downloaded one million times. In July, the J-pop queen Ayumi Hamasaki and SpeXial collaborated on new single Sayonara feat. SpeXial, they also shot the music video together in Japan. On August 1, SpeXial's first travelogue photobook "SpeXial Life in Thailand" was released, while the shooting process was edited as LINE TV's first reality show SpeXial Life. On August 22, SpeXial were invited to perform at a-nation Summer Concert. It was the first time of them to perform Sayonara feat. SpeXial with Ayumi Hamasaki on stage.

SpeXial's third Mandopop album Dangerous was released on September 11, 2015, while Brent and Sam did not participate in the recording due to military services. Before the release of new album, one of the track Dangerous was selected by 20th Century Fox as the Chinese theme song of the film Maze Runner: The Scorch Trials. At the end of September, SpeXial held their second fan meeting under the theme of athletic meet at National Taiwan University Sports Center.

=== 2016: First major concert and Boyz On Fire ===
On January 5, 2016, KKBOX announced that Ding Dang and SpeXial were invited as guest performers of the 11th KKBOX Music Awards Presentation, which was SpeXial's first time performing at this ceremony. On January 9, SpeXial were firstly invited to participate in the recording of TTV's annual Lunar New Year music show - 2016 Super Star: A Red & White Lunar New Year Special. They participated as white team artists and performed two dance songs, Break It Down 11.11 and Dangerous. The music show was then broadcast on February 7. On January 24, SpeXial performed three dance songs at KKBOX Music Awards Presentation, including Love Guardian, Dangerous and Silly Girl. This performance was also Brent's comeback showcase after the end of military service. Although Brent had participated in the 2016 Super Star, the KKBOX Music Awards was broadcast earlier, so this was his official comeback showcase. During these two performance, Sam and Ian were absent at the ceremony as they were fulfilling military service and shooting TV drama respectively.

On May 21–22, SpeXial held their first major concert "SpeXial the 1st concert - SpeXial Land 2016" at Xinzhuang Gymnasium in New Taipei City, while Pets Tseng made guest appearance at their concert. The concert consisted of four themes, which included "Welcome to SpeXial Land", "SpeXial Lover", "Theme Park Challenge" and "Ultimate Theme Park". In addition, SpeXial returned as ten-member group with Sam's comeback showcase one week after the end of military service.

On June 5, SpeXial won "Hito Group" and "Most Popular Group" again at 2016 Hito Music Awards. However, Riley and Ian were absent at the ceremony as they were shooting TV dramas. On July 14, Comic International Productions announced the addition of two new Chinese members Dylan and Zhiwei. They were then debuted at the press conference of fourth Mandopop album Boyz On Fire on July 19, the album was released on August 12. Apart from starring in dramas KO ONE: RE-MEMBER and High 5 Basketball, SpeXial took part in film and micro films and hosted a number of variety shows. Meanwhile, SpeXial entered the Chinese market by taking part in web series and web films such as Ultimate Ranger, Men with Sword and Realm of the Immortals, etc.

On October 25, Wes injured his right leg with a comminuted fracture while shooting High 5 Basketball. He then announced that he will take a three-month break from his activities to rest on November 7. It is expected that Wes will come back in February 2017. On November 4, Simon dropped out of Master's Program at National Taiwan University of Arts to prepare for military service. He continued to work until the last public event, the press conference of High 5 Basketball, held on December 11.

=== 2017: Buddy Buddy ===
On January 25, Simon announced on his personal Facebook fan page that he has filed for contract termination from Comic International Productions due to "unclear accounts", and he intended to leave SpeXial. He is still close and often hangs out with the rest of the members.

On February 9, SpeXial's second travelogue photobook "SpeXial Okinawa Photobook" was released, while the shooting process was edited as LINE TV's reality show SpeXial Life 2. During the shooting of Photobook, SpeXial directed their own music video for "Really Really" from the album Boyz On Fire. These three projects were the last projects of SpeXial consisted of twelve members.

On March 20, Zhiwei officially announced that he was leaving the group. On August 25, Riley officially announced that he was leaving the group after his contract was terminated due to different career goals (he is still close and often hangs out with the other members). As a result, SpeXial will continue as a nine-member group, including Wes, Wayne, Brent, Sam, Evan, Teddy, Win, Ian and Dylan.

On December 17, the press conference for SpeXial's fifth album 'Buddy Buddy' was held in Beijing. The album was released on December 22.

=== 2018: Buddy Buddy ===
On January 5, SpeXial held a press conference for their fifth album 'Buddy Buddy' in Taiwan. However, Dylan was absent due to filming. On January 13, SpeXial was once again invited to participate in the '2018 Super Star' Awards for New Year's Eve, performing six songs, Buddy Buddy, Love Killah, Dangerous, Break it Down, Bad Bad Boy and Super Style, as singers from the white team. The program was broadcast February 15. Wes was originally unable to go on stage due to his leg injury, but in order to be with his fans and group members on New Year's Eve, he disregarded his injury and danced along to Super Style with them. Dylan was absent due to filming.

On March 23, Wayne announced on his birthday that he was going to enlist in the army in August, and it was expected that his first solo concert would be held before May 27. On May 15, Wes updated his Facebook contact information to the contact of the new company, and officially leave SpeXial now that his contract with Comic International Productions has ended, however the real reason was his leg injury never completely healed and it was difficult for him to dance. SpeXial will continue their activities in their group of eight, consisting of Wayne, Brent, Sam, Evan, Teddy, Win, Ian and Dylan.On December 17, a press conference was held in Beijing targeting the group's fifth album, Buddy Buddy, which was released on December 22.

=== 2018: Wes' departure ===
On January 5, 2018, a new press conference was organized for Buddy Buddy in Taiwan. However, Dylan was absent due to filming of other projects. On January 13, the group was again invited to participate in the 2018 Super Star 'Awards for New Years Eve, performing six songs: Buddy Buddy, Love Killah, Dangerous, Break It Down, Bad Bad Boy, and Super Style. The show aired on February 15.

On March 23, Wayne announced on his birthday that he was going to enlist in the army for his military service and that he expected his first solo concert to take place before May 27. On May 15, the group's leader, Wes, announced that he planned to leave SpeXial now that his contract with Comic International Productions had ended, in large part because his leg injury never fully healed and was It made it difficult for him to dance. His departure from the group took place that same day, 28 leaving the group with eight members; Wayne, Brent, Sam, Evan, Teddy, Win, Ian, and Dylan. Wayne enlisted in the military on September 3, 2018, and his military service ended on August 12, 2019.

=== 2019: Wayne and Teddy's departure ===
On September 19, 2019, Wayne announced that he would be leaving SpeXial. Teddy announced his departure from SpeXial on October 15, 2019, the same day as his twenty-sixth birthday.

=== 2020: Brent and Sam's departure ===
On February 7, 2020, Brent announced on the live streaming network's platform that he was officially retiring from SpeXial.

On May 7, 2020, Sam announced on his Facebook fan page that he would be joining TVBS, confirming his official retirement from SpeXial.

=== 2021: Evan and Ian's departure ===
Evan did not renew his contract with Comic International Productions, and signed with another company.

Ian did not renew his contract with Comic International Productions.

== Members ==
=== Members' information ===
Current members
Stage Name	Birth Name	English Name	Position	Birthdate / Nationality	Debut Period	Fan Name	Official Color	Fan Page
Win 風田	Masaya Toyota 豐田將也	Win	Vocalist	February 12, 1992 (age 33); Japan	Period 3	Little Windmill 小風車	Mysterious Black	Facebook; Instagram; Weibo
Dylan	Xiong Ziqi 熊梓淇	Dylan	Vocalist	June 6, 1992 (age 33); China	Period 4	Raccoon 小浣熊	Green	Facebook; Instagram; Weibo
Past members
Ian 易恩	Yi Pochen 易柏辰	Ian	Vocalist	October 24, 1996 (age 29); Taiwan	Period 3	Little Star 小星辰	Light Sky Blue	Facebook; Instagram; Weibo
Evan	Ma Zhenhuan 馬振桓	Evan	Lead Vocalist, Lead Rapper	November 2, 1992 (age 33); Canada	Period 3	Rocking Horse 小木馬	Royal Blue	Facebook; Instagram; Weibo
Chen Xiang 晨翔	Lian Chenxiang 連晨翔	Simon	Vocalist, Visual	January 3, 1992 (age 33); Taiwan	Period 2	Peter Pan 小飛俠	Jade	Facebook; Instagram; Weibo
Zhiwei 執	Zhao Zhiwei 趙志偉	Zhiwei	Vocalist, Lead Dancer	August 8, 1994 (age 31); China	Period 4	Obsession 執念	Indigo	Facebook; Instagram; Weibo
Yi Lun 以綸	Wang Yilun 王以綸	Riley	Lead Rapper	March 18, 1996 (age 29); Canada	Period 3	♀ Bad Princess 壞公主 ♂ Bad Prince 壞王子	Orange	Facebook; Instagram; Weibo; Twitter
Wes 宏正	Lo Hung-cheng 羅弘証	Wes	Leader, Vocalist, Main Dancer	July 26, 1989 (age 36); Taiwan	Period 1	Red Bean 紅豆	Rubine Red	Facebook; Instagram; Weibo
Wei Jin 偉晉	Huang Weijin 黃偉晉	Wayne	Main Vocalist	March 23, 1990 (age 35); Taiwan	Period 1	Little Helmet 小鋼盔	Lemon	Facebook; Instagram; Weibo
Teddy	Chen Xiangxi 陳向熙	Teddy	Vocalist	October 15, 1993 (age 32); Taiwan	Period 2	Honey 蜂蜜	Hot Pink	Facebook; Instagram; Weibo
Ming Jie 明杰	Xu Mingjie 許名傑	Brent (formerly Matt)	Main Vocalist	May 12, 1993 (age 32); Taiwan	Period 1	Pollen 花粉	Pure White	Facebook; Instagram; Weibo
Zi Hong 子閎	Lin Zihong 林子閎	Sam	Main Rapper, Vocalist, Visual	October 1, 1993 (age 32); Taiwan	Period 1	Black Tea 閎茶	Amethyst	Facebook; Instagram; Weibo

== Discography ==
=== Studio albums ===
Album	Album Information	Track
1st	SpeXial: Release Date: December 7, 2012; Label: Warner Music Taiwan; Genre: Mandopop	Track: 1. Super Style "Theme song of Idol Drama KO One Re-act"; 2. Celebrate Loneliness (慶祝寂寞) "Ending song of TV Drama Tie Lihua (Azio TV version)" 3. The Whole World Is Ambiguous (全世界都曖昧); 4. The Best Boyfriend (最佳男友); 5. Strictly Prohibited To Wait (嚴禁守候); 6. SpeXial; 7. Like Superman (超人一樣); 8. Be my girl 9. Only Sing For You To Hear (只唱給你聽); 10. Gone Mad (發飆) - SpeXial version "Theme song of Idol Drama KO one 2"
2nd	Break it down: Release Date: June 12, 2014; Repackage Release Date: August 1, 2014; Label: Warner Music Taiwan; Genre: Mandopop	Track: 1. Fight for Love (為愛戰鬥) "Insert song of Idol Drama KO One Re-act; Theme song of Anti-drug Advertisement (KO one 2 version)" 2. Break it down "Theme song of Idol Drama The X-Dormitory"; 3. Subtle Love (愛這種離譜感覺) "Theme song of Idol Drama Moon River"; 4. Love Flu (心流感); 5. Can't Breathe without You (愛不再呼吸) "Ending song of TV Series Bride of the Century (Star Chinese Channel version)" 6. X (X未知數); 7. Increasingly Love (愛上加愛); 8. Memory Collage (拼貼記憶) "Insert song of Idol Drama The X-Dormitory"; 9. Run Away with Me (陪我逃跑); 10. Just Be Friends (只能當朋友)
3rd	Dangerous: Release Date: September 11, 2015; Repackage Release Date: November 6, 2015; Label: Warner Music Taiwan; Genre: Mandopop	Track: 1. Love Guardian (貼身) "Theme song of Online Drama School Beauty's Personal Bodyguard"; 2. Dangerous "Chinese theme song of Film Maze Runner: The Scorch Trials"; 3. Jam; 4. Bad Bad Boy; 5. Are You OK? (有事嗎); 6. Showdown (攤牌); 7. The Sweet Boys (暖男製造機) "Promotional theme song of Idol Drama I Am Sorry, I Love You"; 8. My Lucky Star (兩個人的博愛特區); 9. Un-Huh! Un-Huh!; 10. Silly Girl (犀利Girl)
4th	Boyz On Fire: Release Date: August 12, 2016; Label: Warner Music Taiwan; Genre: Mandopop	Track: 1. Boyz On Fire "Theme song of Idol Drama KO ONE: RE-MEMBER"; 2. Exclusive News (獨家頭條); 3. When Grief Strikes (憂傷來襲); 4. Love's Attachment (愛的附加檔案); 5. Fire Flame; 6. Really Really; 7. Another Day; 8. Sun & Moon (小太陽大月亮); 9. Glorious; 10. Knight (大俠) "Theme song of Online Drama Ultimate Ranger"
5th	Buddy Buddy: Release Date: December 22, 2017; Label: Nut Music; Genre: Mandopop	Track: 1. Buddy Buddy "Theme song of Idol Drama KO ONE: RE-CALL"; 2. Encore (安可); 3. Bong; 4. Touch me like that 5. Your Champagne (妳的香檳); 6. You can call me 7. The Most Painful Stubborn (最痛的倔强); 8. Do not be a stupid girl 9. Ashamed·Loyalty (難為情·義) "Theme song and insert song of Idol Drama KO 3AN-GUO 2017"; 10. Want To Fly (想飛) "Insert song of Idol Drama KO 3AN-GUO 2017"

=== Extended play ===
Album	Album Information	Track
1st	Love Killah: Release Date: February 4, 2015; Repackage Release Date: March 24, 2015; Label: Warner Music Taiwan; Genre: Mandopop	Track: 1. Love Killah; 2. Break It Down 11.11 "Insert song of Idol Drama KO ONE: RE-MEMBER; Theme song of mobile game Junior Three Kingdoms"; 3. Satisfied (過癮); 4. Missing U (迷失in U)

=== Original soundtrack ===
Album	Album Information	Track
1st	KO One Return (Original Soundtrack): Release Date: January 18, 2013; Label: Warner Music Taiwan; Genre: Mandopop; Award: The 9th KKBOX Music Awards - Mandarin Chart (Album) - No. 8	Track: 1. Gone Mad (發飆) (Performed by SpeXial); 2. Thinking of Someone (一個人想著一個人) (Performed by Pets Tseng); 3. SpeXial Gou Gou (Performed by SpeXial); 4. Lovely Starry Sky (數不盡的星空) (Performed by Pets Tseng); 5. Be Nice To Me (對我好一點) (Performed by Wen Yu Fei); 6. I Think I Need Some Time (我想我需要時間) (Performed by SpeXial); 7. Lonely Time (Instrumental) (一個人想著一個人 配樂); 8. Madness (Instrumental) (發飆 配樂); 9. Fantastic (Instrumental) (發飆 配樂); 10. Dreaming (Instrumental) (一個人想著一個人 配樂)
2nd	The X-Dormitory Original TV Soundtrack: Release Date: July 11, 2014; Label: Warner Music Taiwan; Genre: Mandopop	Track: 1. Break it down (Performed by SpeXial); 2. Love still exists (愛存在) (Performed by Diana Wang); 3. When the time is right (剛剛好) (Performed by Diana Wang); 4. Never let you down (Performed by Hsieh Ho-hsien); 5. Tempting heart (換一個心動) (Performed by Wayne@SpeXial); 6. Memory collage (拼貼記憶) (Performed by SpeXial); 7. Love still exists (Instrumental) (愛存在 配樂); 8. When the time is right (Instrumental) (剛剛好 配樂); 9. Memory collage (Instrumental) (拼貼記憶 配樂); 10. Break it down (Instrumental); 11. Never let you down (Instrumental); 12. Tempting heart (Instrumental) (換一個心動 配樂)

=== Singles ===
- Sayonara feat. SpeXial (2015) — SpeXial (collaborated with Ayumi Hamasaki, appeared on her sixth extended play sixxxxxx)
- 劍心飛揚 (2016) — Evan and Dylan
- 月光訣 (2016) — Dylan
- 終有一天 (2016) — Zhiwei (collaborated with Li Shaminzi, Yu Shuxin, Cheng Yi, Tian Yitong and Liu Runnan)
- I'm Your Super Wang / 我是你的super王 (2017) — Ian
- Hero / 英雄 (2017) — Dylan and Zhiwei (collaborated with Cha Jie, Ryuuji Zhu, Lu Yunfeng and Peng Yuchang
- Fight For You (2017) — Riley
- 膽小鬼 (2017) — Wayne
- 畫師 (2017) — Dylan
- 超完美情人 (2017) — Brent
- 冒险家 (2017) — Dylan
- 戰火荒煙 (2017) — Dylan
- 破泪 (2017) — Wayne and Dylan
- 無名將 (2017) — Evan and Ian

== Concert ==
Concert	Date	Location	Venue	Special Guest(s)	Notes
SpeXial the 1st SpeXial concert - SpeXial Land "SpeXial Land 2016"	May 21, 2016 - May 22, 2016	New Taipei City, Taiwan	Xinzhuang Gymnasium	Pets Tseng	SpeXial's first major concert

== Filmography ==
=== Television series ===
Year 2012

Air Date	Chinese Title	English Title	Original Network	Featured Member(s)	Role	Notes
Aug - Sep 2012	-	PM10-AM03	MTV	Wayne	Huang Hung-wei (黃宏威)	Guest Star (Episode 1 - 4, 7)
Dec 2012 - Feb 2013	終極一班2	KO One Return	GTV Variety Show	Sam	Chung Wan-chun (中萬鈞)	Second Male Lead
Dec 2012 - Feb 2013	終極一班2	KO One Return	GTV Variety Show	Brent	Hua Ling-lung (花靈龍)	Third Male Lead

Year 2013

Air Date	Chinese Title	English Title	Original Network	Featured Member(s)	Role	Notes
May 2013	原來是美男	Fabulous Boys	FTV, GTV Variety Show	Wes, Wayne, Brent, Sam	SpeXial	Guest Stars (Episode 1, 5)
Jul - Nov 2013	終極一班3	KO One Re-act	GTV Variety Show	Sam	Chung Wan-chun (中萬鈞)	Second Male Lead
Jul - Nov 2013	終極一班3	KO One Re-act	GTV Variety Show	Brent	Hua Ling-lung (花靈龍)	Third Male Lead (Episode 1 - 12, 14 - 20)
Jul - Nov 2013	終極一班3	KO One Re-act	GTV Variety Show	Wes	Ku Chan (辜戰)	Supporting Cast (Episode 1, 4 - 20)
Jul - Nov 2013	終極一班3	KO One Re-act	GTV Variety Show	Wayne	Chih Ke (止戈)	Supporting Cast (Episode 1, 4 - 20)

Year 2014

Air Date	Chinese Title	English Title	Original Network	Featured Member(s)	Role	Notes
Mar 2014	麻辣教師GTO 台灣篇	GTO In Taiwan	GTV Variety Show	Wes	Li Huan (李皖)	Supporting Cast
Mar 2014	麻辣教師GTO 台灣篇	GTO In Taiwan	GTV Variety Show	Wayne	Hsu Hsien-sheng (許秈笙)	Supporting Cast
Mar 2014	麻辣教師GTO 台灣篇	GTO In Taiwan	GTV Variety Show	Simon, Teddy, Ian	Students	Guest Stars
Jun - Aug 2014	終極X宿舍	The X-Dormitory	GTV Variety Show, CTV Main Channel	Wes	Huyenchuehlo Tsang-chiung (呼延覺羅·蒼芎)	Male Lead
Jun - Aug 2014	終極X宿舍	The X-Dormitory	GTV Variety Show, CTV Main Channel	Wayne	Yeh Sheng (葉聖)	Supporting Cast (Episode 1 - 10, 12 - 26, 28 - 40)
Jun - Aug 2014	終極X宿舍	The X-Dormitory	GTV Variety Show, CTV Main Channel	Brent	Chen Wei/Yeh Shen (陳偉/葉神)	Supporting Cast (Episode 9, 15 - 25, 27 - 29, 31 - 40)
Jun - Aug 2014	終極X宿舍	The X-Dormitory	GTV Variety Show, CTV Main Channel	Sam, Simon, Evan, Teddy	Members of the War	Guest Stars (Episode 40)
Nov 2014 - Feb 2015	終極惡女	Angel 'N' Devil	GTV Variety Show	Simon	Wang Charlie (王查理)	Male Lead（第2 - 26集）
Nov 2014 - Feb 2015	終極惡女	Angel 'N' Devil	GTV Variety Show	Teddy	Hsiung Ya (熊亞)	Second Male Lead
Nov 2014 - Feb 2015	終極惡女	Angel 'N' Devil	GTV Variety Show	Wes	Kou Chui (勾追)	Supporting Cast (Episode 10 - 14, 19 - 26)
Nov 2014 - Feb 2015	終極惡女	Angel 'N' Devil	GTV Variety Show	Wayne	Wang Ta-wei (王大衛)	Supporting Cast (Episode 11 - 14, 19 - 26)
Nov 2014 - Feb 2015	終極惡女	Angel 'N' Devil	GTV Variety Show	Sam	Hsiang Ming (項冥)	Guest Star (Episode 4, 8 - 9, 25 - 26)

Year 2015

Air Date	Chinese Title	English Title	Original Network	Featured Member(s)	Role	Notes
Sep - Oct 2015	明若曉溪	Moon River	GTV Variety Show, LINE TV	Sam	Mu Liubing (牧流冰)	Male Lead
Sep - Oct 2015	明若曉溪	Moon River	GTV Variety Show, LINE TV	Evan	Feng Jianche (風澗澈)	Second Male Lead
Sep - Oct 2015	明若曉溪	Moon River	GTV Variety Show, LINE TV	Teddy	Lan Di (藍迪)	Guest Star (Episode 28 - 30)
Sep - Oct 2015	明若曉溪	Moon River	GTV Variety Show, LINE TV	Wes	Gui Tang (鬼堂)	Guest Star (Episode 28, 30)

Year 2016

Air Date	Chinese Title	English Title	Original Network	Featured Member(s)	Role	Notes
Jun - Sep 2016	終極一班4	KO ONE: RE-MEMBER	GTV Variety Show, iQiyi Taiwan, Youku	Wes	Ku Chan (辜戰)	Male Lead
Jun - Sep 2016	終極一班4	KO ONE: RE-MEMBER	GTV Variety Show, iQiyi Taiwan, Youku	Wayne	Chih Ke (止戈)	Second Male Lead
Jun - Sep 2016	終極一班4	KO ONE: RE-MEMBER	GTV Variety Show, iQiyi Taiwan, Youku	Zhiwei	Chih (執)	Third Male Lead (Episode 1 - 36, 44 - 49, 57 - 60)
Jun - Sep 2016	終極一班4	KO ONE: RE-MEMBER	GTV Variety Show, iQiyi Taiwan, Youku	Win	Shen Mi (榊覔)	Guest Star (Episode 33 - 40, 42 - 45, 47 - 48, 50 - 51, 59 - 60)
Oct 2016 - Jan 2017	High 5 制霸青春	High 5 Basketball	GTV Variety Show, iQiyi Taiwan	Wes	Ko Wei-chen (柯威震)	Male Lead
Oct 2016 - Jan 2017	High 5 制霸青春	High 5 Basketball	GTV Variety Show, iQiyi Taiwan	Simon	Chan Chih-kai (詹智凱)	Second Male Lead
Nov 6, 2016	有喜歡的人台湾篇 心有所屬	Sukinahito ga Iru Koto in Taiwan	WAKUWAKU JAPAN, Fuji Television	Teddy	Che (澈)	Second Male Lead

Year 2017

Air Date	Chinese Title	English Title	Original Network	Featured Member(s)	Role	Notes
	擇天記	Fighter of the Destiny		Zhiwei	Huo Guang	Supporting role
	稍息立正我愛你	Attention Love 520	EBC Variety	Riley	Wang Chin-li	Second male lead
	醉玲瓏	Lost Love in Times		Zhiwei		Supporting role
	浪花一朵朵	My Mr. Mermaid	Hunan TV	Dylan	Tang Yibai	Male lead

=== Web series ===
Year 2014

Air Date	Chinese Title	English Title	Original Network	Featured Member(s)	Role	Notes
Aug 18, 2014	HOLD住愛情	Holding Love	QQLive	Evan	Outgoing Boy (外向型男孩)	Guest Star (Episode 9)
Aug 18, 2014	HOLD住愛情	Holding Love	QQLive	Simon	Bad Man (壞男人)	Guest Star (Episode 9)
Aug 18, 2014	HOLD住愛情	Holding Love	QQLive	Teddy	Otaku Boy (阿宅型男孩)	Guest Star (Episode 9)

Year 2015

Air Date	Chinese Title	English Title	Original Network	Featured Member(s)	Role	Notes
May - Aug 2015	《孤獨的美食家》中國版 （第一季·台灣篇）	“Kodoku no Gourmet” China Version (Taiwan Season 1)	Youku, Tudou	Wes	A-wei at a young age (年輕阿偉)	Guest Star (Episode 6, 12)
Aug - Sep 2015	校花的貼身高手 第一季	Mr. Bodyguard Season 1	iQiyi	Wayne	Han Bin/ Xiao Hu (韓濱/小琥)	Third Male Lead (Episode 2 - 3,7 - 8,11 - 24)
Aug - Sep 2015	校花的貼身高手 第一季	Mr. Bodyguard Season 1	iQiyi	Sam	Lin Yi (林逸)	Cameo
Dec 2015 - Mar 2016	同樂會	Happy Together	Line TV	Evan	Paul (王成文)	Guest Star (Episode 8, 14 - 15)

Year 2016

Air Date	Chinese Title	English Title	Original Network	Featured Member(s)	Role	Notes
Apr - Jul 2016	終極遊俠	Ultimate Ranger	Mango TV	Evan	Jerry (童英傑)	Second Male Lead (Episode 4 - 40)
Apr - Jul 2016	終極遊俠	Ultimate Ranger	Mango TV	Dylan	Lan Bo (藍波)	Supporting Cast (Episode 6 - 12, 14 - 15, 18, 22, 24, 27, 31, 35)
Aug - Sep 2016	刺客列傳	Men with Sword	Sohu TV	Ian	Qi Zhikan (齊之侃)	Male Lead (Episode 2 - 5, 8 - 27)
Aug - Sep 2016	刺客列傳	Men with Sword	Sohu TV	Dylan	Zhong Kunyi (仲堃儀)	Male Lead (Episode 3 - 10, 14 - 20, 22 - 26, 28 - 30)
Aug - Sep 2016	刺客列傳	Men with Sword	Sohu TV	Zhiwei	Gongsun Qian (公孫鈐)	Male Lead (Episode 2, 4 - 13, 15 - 18, 21 - 27, 29 - 30)
Aug - Sep 2016	刺客列傳	Men with Sword	Sohu TV	Wayne	Yu Qing (毓埥)	Supporting Cast (Episode 16 - 18, 21 - 22, 25 - 27, 29 - 30)
Aug - Sep 2016	刺客列傳	Men with Sword	Sohu TV	Evan	Jian Bin (蹇賓)	Supporting Cast (Episode 2 - 5, 8 - 9, 11 - 15, 19 - 27)
Aug - Sep 2016	刺客列傳	Men with Sword	Sohu TV	Simon	Qiu Zhen (裘振)	Guest Star (Episode 1, 2, 8)
Aug - Sep 2016	刺客列傳	Men with Sword	Sohu TV	Win	Qi Kun (啟昆)	Guest Star (Episode 1)
Dec 2016	明星志願	STARDOM	iQiyi	Ian	Chen Yifu (陳奕夫)	Supporting Cast

Year 2017

Air Date	Chinese Title	English Title	Original Network	Featured Member(s)	Role	Notes
Jan 2017	明星志願2	STARDOM 2	iQiyi	Ian	Chen Yifu (陳奕夫)	Supporting Cast
Jan - Feb 2017	降龍伏虎小濟公		Sohu TV	Ian	Cheng Fenglin (程鳳麟)	Module Male Lead
Jan - Mar 2017	學院傳說之三生三世桃花緣	Taohua Yuan	LETV	Dylan	Liu Yun (流雲)	Supporting Cast
Feb - Mar 2017	我與你的光年距離	Long For You	LETV	Riley	Li Zhe (李哲)	Second Male Lead
	畫心師	Painting Heart Expert	Sohu TV	Dylan	Ning Weiyu (寧為玉)	Male Lead
	刺客列傳2龍血玄黃	Men With Sword 2	Sohu TV	Dylan	Zhong Kunyi (仲堃儀)	
	終極三國2017		Youku	Sam	Guan Yu (關羽)	Male Lead
	終極三國2017		Youku	Wayne	Liu Bei (劉備), Zhi Ge (止戈)	Second Male Lead
	終極三國2017		Youku	Evan	Zhao Yun (趙雲)	Supporting Cast
	終極三國2017		Youku	Ian	Ma Chao (馬超)	Supporting Cast
	囧爸練習生		Choco TV	Teddy	Mo Chia-hao (莫家豪)	

=== Feature film ===
Release date	Original title	English title	Featured member(s)	Role	Notes
Sep 23, 2016	我的蛋男情人	My Egg Boy	Win	Japanese sperm	Cameo

=== Short film ===
Release date	Original title	English title	Network	Featured member(s)	Role	Notes
Jan 19, 2012	一百分的吻	100 Kiss	Taiwan Yahoo Celebrity Entertainment	Wayne	Boyfriend in high school	Cameo
Sep 25, 2016	出發！航向遠大的夢想		Maritime and Port Bureau Premiere	Wes	A-cheng	

=== TV film ===
Release date	Original title	English title	Network	Featured member(s)	Role	Notes
Mar 21, 2015	傑克的爺爺	Jack's Grandfather	PTS	Sam	Lin Tzu-hung	
Jan 1, 2017	麥呆的劈腿日記	A Tale Of Two-Timer	VideoLand Movie	Sam	Mai Wei	

=== Web film ===
Release date	Original title	English title	Network	Featured member(s)	Role	Notes
Aug 25, 2016	仙俠學院	Realm of the Immortals	Youku	Riley	Lu Fan	Male lead
Oct 26, 2016	殺了我	Kill Me	Youku	Sam	Situ Qian	Male lead
Mar 6, 2017	異能事務所之嗜血判官	Super Firm	QQLive	Sam	Shen Yixing	Male lead
Mar 6, 2017	異能事務所之嗜血判官	Super Firm	QQLive	Wayne	Nie Yincang	Second male lead
Mar 6, 2017	異能事務所之嗜血判官	Super Firm	QQLive	Dylan	Ye Yuwen	Supporting cast
	玄筆錄前傳			Riley	Wu Xiaoxie	Male lead
	鐵嶺風雲			Dylan	Zhiming	Male lead
	超級王爺			Ian	Xiaoyin	Male lead
	擒愛攻略	Love Strategy	iQiyi	Teddy		Second male lead

=== Reality show ===
Date	Title	Network	Notes
May 27 - Aug 28, 2014 (Every Thursday)	Anything SpeXial	SpeXial YouTube channel	Topic: 1. 20140527 Welcome Party (迎新會); 2. 20140604 Radish Squatting (瘋狂蘿蔔蹲); 3. 20140612 The Heirs (繼承者們); 4. 20140619 Smiling Trampoline (微笑大作戰); 5. 20140626 Star Training Part One (大明星訓練班 上集); 6. 20140703 Star Training Part Two (大明星訓練班 下集); 7. 20140710 Cooperative Games Part One (團結大作戰 上集); 8. 20140717 Cooperative Games Part Two (團結大作戰 下集); 9. 20140724 Nanny Challenge (褓姆大作戰); 10. 20140731 Cooking Challenge - Shopping (料理大作戰 買菜篇); 11. 20140807 Cooking Challenge - Signature Dish (料理大作戰 手路菜篇); 12. 20140814 Sports Day (全民運動會); 13. 20140821 Keelung Night Market Challenge (基隆夜市大作戰); 14. 20140828 Final Episode (最終篇)
Jul 24 - Aug 7, 2015 (Every Friday)	SpeXial Life	SpeXial Life LINE TV official channel	Topic: 1. 20150724 EP01 SpeXial’s Vacation in Thailand! (SpeXial泰國大解放！); 2. 20150731 EP02 SpeXial’s Friendship Challenge? (SpeXial的友情試煉！？); 3. 20150806 Special Brown Drawing Competition (賣隊友之熊大盃繪圖比賽); 4. 20150807 EP03 SpeXial’s Summer Love! (SpeXial的夏日戀情大公開！)
May 6, 2016	Anything SpeXial Season 2	QQLive	Topic: 1. Anything SpeXial One; 2. Anything SpeXial Two
Jan 27, 2017 - (Every Friday)	SpeXial Life 2	SpeXial Life 2 LINE TV official channel	Topic: 1. 20170127 生日篇; 2. 20170203 對抗賽篇（上）; 3. 20170210 對抗賽篇（下）

=== Variety show ===
Original title	English title	Date	Network	Featured member(s)	Notes
娛樂百分百	100% Entertainment	Jan 21, 2015; Feb 12, 2015	GTV Variety Show	Wes, Wayne	Guest Hosts
娛樂百分百	100% Entertainment	Aug 10, 2016	GTV Variety Show	Wayne, Brent, Win	Guest Hosts
娛樂百分百	100% Entertainment	Sep 6, 2016; Oct 5, 2016; Oct 12, 2016; Oct 27, 2016; Nov 3, 2016; Nov 4, 2016; Nov 9, 2016; Dec 2, 2016; Dec 3, 2016	GTV Variety Show	Wayne, Sam	Guest Hosts
娛樂百分百	100% Entertainment	Nov 8, 2016	GTV Variety Show	Wayne, Teddy, Win	Guest Hosts
娛樂百分百	100% Entertainment	Nov 21, 2016; Dec 9, 2016	GTV Variety Show	Wayne, Win	Guest Hosts
天天向上	Day Day Up	Jan - Feb 2016	Hunan Television	Riley	Host
SpeXial的日本二本松之旅	Simon X Win X Koubaigou	Mar 2016	SET Metro	Simon, Win	Hosts
火星情報局	Mars Intelligence Agency	Apr & Jun 2016	Youku	Riley	Senior Agent
完全娛樂	ShowBiz	Aug 24, 2016	SET Metro	Riley	Guest Hosts
完全娛樂	ShowBiz	Nov 10, 2016; Nov 23, 2016; Nov 30, 2016; Dec 7, 2016; Dec 14, 2016; Jan 11, 2017; Jan 18, 2017; Jan 25, 2017	YouTube	Riley	Guest Hosts
完全娛樂	ShowBiz	Nov 16, 2016; Dec 20, 2016	YouTube	Brent, Riley	Guest Hosts
全球中文音樂榜上榜	Global Chinese Music	Sep 17, 2016; Oct 15, 2016	TVBS Entertainment Channel, TVBS	Wayne, Teddy	Guest Hosts
全球中文音樂榜上榜	Global Chinese Music	Nov 15, 2016	TVBS Entertainment Channel, TVBS	Wayne, Brent	Guest Hosts
全球中文音樂榜上榜	Global Chinese Music	Nov 19, 2016; Dec 10, 2016	TVBS Entertainment Channel, TVBS	Brent, Riley	Guest Hosts
一年級·畢業季	Freshman Graduation	Oct 2016 - Jan 2017	Hunan TV	Zhiwei	Auditor
綜藝3國智	3 Kingdoms	Nov 2016 -	TTV Main Channel	Brent, Evan, Teddy, Win, Riley, Ian	Hosts, Guests
最音樂 音樂三國論	The Groovin'	Dec 4, 2016; Dec 11, 2016; Dec 18, 2016	Youku	Win	Guest Host

=== Music videos ===
Year 2012

Date	English Title	Chinese Title	Lead Artist	Featured Member(s)
December 19	Celebrate Loneliness	慶祝寂寞	SpeXial	SpeXial
December 20	Gone Mad	發飆	SpeXial	SpeXial

Year 2013

Date	English Title	Chinese Title	Lead Artist	Featured Member(s)
January 9	Super Style	-	SpeXial	SpeXial
February 17	Thinking of Someone	一個人想著一個人	Pets Tseng	Sam
May 2	Hard to put it down	放心不下	Tiger Huang	Wes
September 8	Too Young To Love	早熟	Diana Wang	Simon
December 17	I Remember	-	F.I.R.	Wes, Simon

Year 2014

Date	English Title	Chinese Title	Lead Artist	Featured Member(s)
June 3	Break it down	-	SpeXial	SpeXial
July 14	Subtle Love	愛這種離譜感覺	SpeXial	SpeXial
August 23	Can't Breathe without You	愛不再呼吸	SpeXial	SpeXial
September 22	X	X未知數	SpeXial	SpeXial
September 24	Memory College	拼貼記憶	SpeXial	SpeXial

Year 2015

Date	English Title	Chinese Title	Lead Artist	Featured Member(s)
January 19	Love Killah	-	SpeXial	SpeXial
February 7	Missing U	迷失in U	SpeXial	SpeXial
July 19	Sayonara feat. SpeXial	-	Ayumi Hamasaki	SpeXial
August 17	Love Guardian	貼身	SpeXial	SpeXial
September 14	Dangerous	-	SpeXial	SpeXial
October 20	The Sweet Boys	暖男製造機	SpeXial	SpeXial
November 5	Silly Girl	犀利Girl	SpeXial	SpeXial

Year 2016

Date	English Title	Chinese Title	Lead Artist	Featured Member(s)
July 19	Boyz On Fire	-	SpeXial	SpeXial
August 10	When Grief Strikes	憂傷來襲	SpeXial	SpeXial
September 12	Please	最後的請求	Lion	Simon
December 12	I Don't Know	-	Diana Wang	Wayne

Year 2017

Date	English Title	Chinese Title	Lead Artist	Featured Member(s)
January 13	I'm Your Super Wang	我是你的super王	Ian	Ian
February 10	Fight For You	-	Riley	Riley
	Really Really	-	SpeXial	SpeXial

== Publications ==
=== Photobook ===
Publication Date	Publisher	Title	Member(s)
August 1, 2015	Kadokawa Taiwan Corporation	SpeXial Life in Thailand (SpeXial Life 泰青春寫真遊記)	Wes, Wayne, Simon, Evan, Teddy, Win, Riley, Ian
February 9, 2017	Kadokawa Taiwan Corporation	SpeXial Okinawa Photobook (SpeXial沖繩寫真遊記)	SpeXial

=== Television series publications ===
Publication date	Publisher	Title	Member(s)
December 28, 2012	Shui-Ling Culture & Books	KO One Return Photobook (終極一班2 故事寫真)	Brent, Sam
January 12, 2013	Shui-Ling Culture & Books	KO One Return Notebook (終極一班2 校園生活筆記書)	Brent, Sam
February 5, 2013	Shui-Ling Culture & Books	KO One Return - Behind the Scenes and Classic Quotes (終極一班2 劇照紀念冊)	Brent, Sam
July 10, 2013	Shui-Ling Culture & Books	KO One Re-act Photobook (終極一班3 酷帥寫真)	Wes, Wayne, Brent, Sam
August 7, 2013	Shui-Ling Culture & Books	KO One Return 3 Notebook (終極一班3 戰力筆記書)	Wes, Wayne, Brent, Sam
October 27, 2013	Shui-Ling Culture & Books	KO One Re-act Photobook (終極一班3 閃光戰鬥寫真)	Wes, Wayne, Brent, Sam
July 14, 2014	Shui-Ling Culture & Books	The X-Dormitory Photobook (終極X宿舍 電視寫真)	Wes, Wayne, Brent
November 15, 2014	Shui-Ling Culture & Books	Angel 'N' Devil Photobook (終極惡女 人物誌)	Simon, Teddy, Wes, Wayne
December 23, 2014	Shui-Ling Culture & Books	Angel 'N' Devil Story Photobook (終極惡女 故事寫真)	Simon, Teddy, Wes, Wayne, Sam
January 26, 2015	Shui-Ling Culture & Books	Angel 'N' Devil Story Battle Copper Dimension Notebook (終極惡女 決戰銅時空筆記書)	Simon, Teddy, Wes, Wayne, Sam
January 12, 2016	Suncolor	終極時空：時空旅人AR經典珍藏組	Simon, Teddy, Wes, Wayne, Sam
December 8, 2016	Kadokawa Taiwan Corporation	High 5 Basketball Photobook (High5制霸青春 熱血寫真本)	Wes, Simon

== Awards and nominations ==
Year	Award	Category	Result
2014	2014 Hito Music Awards	Hito Group	Nominated
2015	2014 Canadian Chinese Pop Music Awards	Best New Group	Won
2015	The 5th Global Chinese Golden Chart	Most Popular Group	Nominated
2015	2015 Hito Music Awards	Hito Group	Won
2015	2015 Hito Music Awards	Most Popular Group	Won
2016	2015 Canadian Chinese Pop Music Awards	Top 10 Mandarin Songs "Love Guardian"	Won
2016	The 6th Global Chinese Golden Chart	Most Popular Group	Nominated
2016	The 4th Vchart Awards	Top Promising Artist	Won
2016	2016 Hito Music Awards	Most Popular Group	Won
2016	2016 Hito Music Awards	Hito Group	Won
