= Xu Kaicheng =

Chinese actor

- Born: 8 August 1990 (age 36); Shanghai, China
- Education: Shanghai Theater Academy
- Occupation: Actor
- Years active: 2012–present
- Agent: Ming Dao Studio

Chinese name
- Traditional Chinese: 徐開騁
- Simplified Chinese: 徐开骋
Transcriptions
Standard Mandarin
- Hanyu Pinyin: Xú Kāichěng

Xu Kaicheng (Chinese: 徐开骋, born 8 August 1990) is a Chinese actor. He is known for his roles in the web dramas I Cannot Hug You, Moonshine and Valentine, I'm a Pet At Dali Temple, and Well-Intended Love.

== Biography ==
Xu was born in Shanghai, China. He learned dance since young, and enrolled in the Shanghai Theater Academy in 2007, majoring in ballet. Xu first appeared in the variety program Jia You Hao Nan Er.

== Career ==
In 2012, Xu signed a contract with Ming Dao's entertainment agency, and made his acting debut in the television series The Queen of SOP 2. He continued to star in various supporting roles in television series.

In 2017, Xu first gained recognition with his role as a vampire in the fantasy web drama I Cannot Hug You.

In 2018, Xu starred in the fantasy romance drama Moonshine and Valentine as the second male lead. The series was a commercial success and Xu became known to wider audiences. The same year, he played his first leading role in the historical comedy web series I'm a Pet at The Dali Temple, which was a moderate success.

In 2019, Xu starred in the romantic comedy web drama Well-Intended Love. The series was a hit and led to increased popularity and recognition for Xu. The same year, he starred in the fencing drama Boys To Men.

In 2020, Xu starred in the xianxia romance comedy Dance of the Phoenix. He was cast in the historical fantasy drama Novoland: Pearl Eclipse.

== Filmography ==
=== Film ===
| Year | English title | Chinese title | Role | Notes/Ref. |
|---|---|---|---|---|
| 2016 | —N/a | 暗影特工局 | Dong Anping | Web film |
| 2018 | Perfect-Lover.com | 来自你的瓦伦汀 | —N/a | |
| 2020 | The Yin-Yang Master: Dream of Eternity | 阴阳师: 晴雅集 | a Mad Painter | |

=== Television series ===
| Year | English title | Chinese title | Role | Network | Notes/Ref. |
|---|---|---|---|---|---|
| 2013 | The Queen of SOP 2 | 胜女的代价2 | Duan Kai | Hunan TV | |
| 2014 | If I Love You | 如果我爱你 | Liu Kai | Hunan TV | |
| 2015 | The Backlight of Love | 逆光之恋 | Zheng Yang | Tencent | |
| 2015 | Campus Belle | 校花攻略 | Zhao Mo | Youku | |
| 2015 | Mr. Bodyguard | 校花的贴身高手 | Situ Jiong | iQiyi | |
| 2015 | Moon River | 明若晓溪 | Dong Xiaonan | Hunan TV | |
| 2016 | The Lover's Lies | 爱人的谎言 | Dong Xiaoqiu | Zhejiang TV | |
| 2016 | Idol Hunter | 偶像猎手 | An Feng / An Lin | LeTV | |
| 2017 | Midnight Diner | 深夜食堂 | Cai Zhiyong | Beijing TV, Zhejiang TV | Guest appearance |
| 2017 | My Ruby My Blood | 一粒红尘 | Wang Ge | Dragon TV | |
| 2017 | I Cannot Hug You | 无法拥抱的你 | Cui Junhe | Sohu TV | |
| 2018 | The Way We Were | 归去来 | William | Beijing TV, Dragon TV | Cameo |
| 2018 | Moonshine and Valentine | 结爱·千岁大人的初恋 | Tao Jialin | Tencent | |
| 2018 | My Beautiful Teacher 2 | 我的美女老师第二季 | Qin Chao | iQiyi | |
| 2018 | I'm a Pet At Dali Temple | 我在大理寺当宠物2 | Qing Moyan | Sohu TV | |
| 2019 | Well-Intended Love | 奈何boss要娶我 | Ling Yizhou | Mango TV, Sohu TV | |
| 2019 | The Next Top Star | 热搜女王 | Baili Lan | Sohu TV | Guest appearance |
| 2019 | Boys to Men | 拜托啦师兄 | Ou Yang | Youku | |
| 2020 | Well-Intended Love 2 | 奈何boss要娶我2 | Ling Yizhou | Sohu TV, Tencent | |
| 2020 | Dance of the Phoenix | 且听凤鸣 | Jun Linzhou | Tencent | |
| 2021 | Broker | 掮客 | Qin Bin | iQiyi | |
| 2021 | Young and Beautiful | 我的漂亮朋友 | Xing Tianming | Tencent | |
| 2021 | Novoland: Pearl Eclipse | 斛珠夫人 | Di Xu / Chu Zhongxu | Tencent | |
| 2021 | The Female Student at the Imperial College | 国子监来了个女弟子 | Yan Yin Zhi | Tencent | |
| 2022 | Ordinary Greatness | 警察荣誉 | Yang Shu | CCTV8, iQiyi | |
| 2023 | Love is an Accident | 花溪记 | An Jingzhao | iQiyi | |
| 2023 | Got a Crush on You | 恋恋红尘 | Su Qingche | Tencent | |

== Discography ==
| Year | English title | Chinese title | Album | Notes/Ref. |
|---|---|---|---|---|
| 2018 | "The Fish In My Embrace" | 怀里的鱼 | I'm a Pet At Dali Temple OST | |

== Awards and nominations ==
| Year | Award | Category | Nominated work | Result | Ref. |
|---|---|---|---|---|---|
| 2019 | Golden Bud - The Fourth Network Film And Television Festival | Best Actor | Well-Intended Love | Nominated | |
| 2019 | iFeng Fashion Choice Awards | Fashion Popularity of the Year | —N/a | Won | |
