= Huang Hsiu-meng =

Taiwanese politician and educator

Huang Hsiu-meng (Chinese: 黃秀孟; pinyin: Huáng Xiùmèng; born 1944) is a Taiwanese politician and educator.

Huang was born in 1944. She attended National Taiwan Normal University and later earned certification from National Kaohsiung Normal University and the Institute of Revolutionary Practice. Huang became a middle school teacher. She has chaired the Taiwan Education Association and served on the board of Kuang Wu Institute of Technology. Huang was a member of the Taiwan Provincial Assembly from its seventh through ninth convocations, between 1981 and 1994. She was elected to the Legislative Yuan in 1995 and 1998, representing Tainan County as a member of the Kuomintang. Huang had also served on the Kuomintang's Central Committee.
