= Well-Intended Love =

2019 Mandarin-language television series

- Genre: Drama romance
- Directed by: Wu Qiang
- Starring: Wang Simona; Xu Kaicheng
- Country of origin: China
- Original language: Mandarin
- No. of seasons: 2
- No. of episodes: 36

Original release
- Network: Sohu
- Release: January 17, 2019 – March 19, 2020

Well-Intended Love (Chinese: 奈何BOSS要娶我) is a 2019 Chinese television series starring Wang Shuang and Xu Kaicheng. The plot revolves around budding D-list actress, Xia Lin (Wang Shuang) who is diagnosed with leukemia. To secure a bone marrow donation, she makes a marriage pact with a handsome, young CEO, Ling Yi Zhou (Xu Kaicheng).

== Cast ==
- Simona Wang as Xia Lin, an aspiring actress who is diagnosed with leukemia. She signs a two-year marriage contract with Ling Yi Zhou.
- Xu Kaicheng as Ling Yi Zhou, the overbearing CEO of Lingshi Group who agrees to donate his bone marrow to Xia Lin in return for her hand in marriage.
- Ian Yi as Chu Yan, a famous actor and Ling Yi Zhou's friend
- Liu Jia Xi as Jia Fei, Xia Lin's best friend and roommate and Wen Li's girlfriend
- Huang Qian Shuo as Wen Li, Ling Yi Zhou's personal assistant and Jia Fei's boyfriend
- Sun Jia Qi as An Ran, Chu Yan's friend as well as Ling Yi Zhou's childhood friend, whom she is in love with (Season 1)
- Kiwi Shang as Yin Shuangshuang, a celebrity figure and Chu Yan's friend
- Yang Hao Ming as Nan Jin Tian, Xia Lin's neighbor and Ling Yi Zhou's step-brother who often conspires with An Ran to make trouble for Xia Lin (Season 1)
- Chen Xin Ru as Yang Tong, Xia Lin's assistant (Season 1)

== Episodes ==
=== Season 1 (2019) ===
No. overall	No. in season	Title	Directed by	Written by	Original release date
1	1	"Episode 1"	Unknown	Unknown	January 17, 2019
D-list actress Xia Lin encounters dashing CEO Ling Yi Zhou, who turns out to possess something she desperately needs.
2	2	"Episode 2"	Unknown	Unknown	January 17, 2019
Xia Lin appears with Yi Zhou at a jewelry show and encounters her ex, Zhao Jia Yan, whose attempt to humiliate her backfires.
3	3	"Episode 3"	Unknown	Unknown	January 17, 2019
Now living under one roof with Xia Lin, Yi Zhou tells Chu Yan and An Ran about his marriage, but Xia Lin wishes to keep it under wraps.
4	4	"Episode 4"	Unknown	Unknown	January 18, 2019
Yi Zhou drives Xia Lin to work and encounters actress Yin Shuang Shuang, who enlists Xia Lin’s help in approaching Yi Zhou about a joint press conference.
5	5	"Episode 5"	Unknown	Unknown	January 18, 2019
Yi Zhou’s new social media account explodes with followers. An Ran finds a new accomplice in her efforts to sabotage Yi Zhou and Xia Lin’s marriage.
6	6	"Episode 6"	Unknown	Unknown	January 18, 2019
Xia Lin accepts a new role and meets the dog’s mysterious owner, Nan Jin Tian. An Ran sets another trap for Xia Lin.
7	7	"Episode 7"	Unknown	Unknown	January 24, 2019
After an accident, Yi Zhou begins to distance himself from Xia Lin. Rumors about Chu Yan and Xia Lin spread online.
8	8	"Episode 8"	Unknown	Unknown	January 24, 2019
As her efforts to win back Yi Zhou’s heart come to naught, Xia Lin seeks solace at Jin Tian’s place and tells him about her marriage.
9	9	"Episode 9"	Unknown	Unknown	January 31, 2019
Yi Zhou becomes suspicious of the tea An Ran serves him. Chu Yan’s dad humiliates Xia Lin, putting his business ties with Yi Zhou at risk.
10	10	"Episode 10"	Unknown	Unknown	January 31, 2019
Yi Zhou and Xia Lin’s relationship becomes public, Jin Tian sets his scheme into motion and Xia Lin discovers an unpleasant truth.
11	11	"Episode 11"	Unknown	Unknown	January 31, 2019
After hearing Yi Zhou’s emotional confession, Xia Lin tries to strike out on her own with a new job and moves back into her old apartment.
12	12	"Episode 12"	Unknown	Unknown	February 5, 2019
Xia Lin’s interview for a commercial role unravels, Yi Zhou makes a deal with Chu Yan’s dad, and Jin Tian discusses a new scheme with An Ran.
13	13	"Episode 13"	Unknown	Unknown	February 5, 2019
When a piece of evidence implicates Xia Lin in a crime, Yi Zhou suspects intrigue and confronts someone close to her.
14	14	"Episode 14"	Unknown	Unknown	February 7, 2019
Yi Zhou helps expose An Ran’s scheme, which causes a media firestorm. Xia Lin accepts a new role and encounters a mysterious woman at a clothing store.
15	15	"Episode 15"	Unknown	Unknown	February 7, 2019
Jia Fei asks Xia Lin to co-star with Chu Yan in her movie about unrequited love. Xia Lin tries helping Yi Zhou to reconcile with his estranged mom.
16	16	"Episode 16"	Unknown	Unknown	February 12, 2019
Xia Lin learns about Yi Zhou’s and Jin Tian’s troubled, intertwined pasts and confronts unexpected, potentially life-changing news.
17	17	"Episode 17"	Unknown	Unknown	February 12, 2019
Jin Tian shows Xia Lin his true colors as Yi Zhou races against time to locate her, but An Ran is the only one who can help him trace the culprit.
18	18	"Episode 18"	Unknown	Unknown	February 14, 2019
After her attempts to escape come to naught, Xia Lin outwits Jin Tian and sends a signal to Yi Zhou - but Jin Tian is one step ahead.
19	19	"Episode 19"	Unknown	Unknown	February 14, 2019
As Yi Zhou’s fate hangs by a thread, Xia Lin and Chu Yan must prevent someone close to him from taking control of Lingshi Group.
20	20	"Episode 20"	Unknown	Unknown	February 14, 2019
Yi Zhou tells his mom that he chooses not to retaliate against Jin Tian. Xia Lin faces an unforeseeable threat.

=== Season 2 (2020) ===
No. overall	No. in season	Title	Directed by	Written by	Original release date
1	1	"Episode 1"	Unknown	Unknown	February 13, 2020
Actress Xia Lin crosses paths with wealthy business man Ling Yi Zhou, and their interaction is caught by paparazzi and sparks disapproval.
2	2	"Episode 2"	Unknown	Unknown	February 13, 2020
Xia Lin confronts Ling Yi Zhou on his shocking announcement, who explains the best way to shake off a scandal is turning it into a positive story.
3	3	"Episode 3"	Unknown	Unknown	February 20, 2020
As a couple, Xia Lin and Ling Yi Zhou arrive at a villa to participate in a reality show, where a puppy creates an unexpected complication.
4	4	"Episode 4"	Unknown	Unknown	February 20, 2020
On her first day shooting for a new show, Xia Lin is pushed into the water out of bad intention, but luckily is saved by co-star Chu Yan.
5	5	"Episode 5"	Unknown	Unknown	February 20, 2020
Jia Fei advises Xia Lin on moving in with Ling Yi Zhou, whose romantic gestures start to make Xia Lin feel real about their relationship.
6	6	"Episode 6"	Unknown	Unknown	February 27, 2020
Xia Lin and Ling Yi Zhou clear some misunderstandings; Xia Lin gets drunk and ponders on her feelings; Fu Wei Ning schemes against Ling Yi Zhou.
7	7	"Episode 7"	Unknown	Unknown	February 27, 2020
Ling Yi Zhou and Xia Lin start a different kind of living together. Chu Yan has a heart-to-heart with his father, then opens up to Ling Yi Zhou.
8	8	"Episode 8"	Unknown	Unknown	February 27, 2020
Xia Lin makes a bold move, then goes with Ling Yi Zhou to see his grandma. Facing challenges in his company, Chu Yan receives unexpected help.
9	9	"Episode 9"	Unknown	Unknown	March 5, 2020
Chu Yan sabotages the blind date his father sets for him. Ling Yi Zhou surprises Xia Lin with a grand gesture, leaving vengeful Jiang Yu Shi furious.
10	10	"Episode 10"	Unknown	Unknown	March 5, 2020
Xia Lin and Ling Yi Zhou’s attention are brought to Yao Liang’s accident. Astonished by Ling Yi Zhou’s secret, Xia Lin loses trust in him.
11	11	"Episode 11"	Unknown	Unknown	March 5, 2020
Jiang Yu Shi makes a big announcement with Xia Lin’s social media account. With Jia Fei’s advice, Xia Lin tries to make amends with Ling Yi Zhou.
12	12	"Episode 12"	Unknown	Unknown	March 12, 2020
With Ling Yi Zhou still acting aloof, Xia Lin turns to his grandma for advice, and learns about the shadow from his past.
13	13	"Episode 13"	Unknown	Unknown	March 12, 2020
Xia Lin and Ling Yi Zhou open up to each other and make up. Jiang Yu Shi’s schemes backfire, then she realizes Ling Yi Zhou is not the one to blame.
14	14	"Episode 14"	Unknown	Unknown	March 12, 2020
Ling Yi Zhou confronts Fu Wei Ning, where Xia Lin is hit on the head and loses her memory. Chu Yan and Ruan Meng share an elevator incident.
15	15	"Episode 15"	Unknown	Unknown	March 19, 2020
Xia Lin pieces together the last two years and demands to break the contact with Ling Yi Zhou, who agrees but asks her to visit three places with him.
16	16	"Episode 16"	Unknown	Unknown	March 19, 2020
One place after another, Xia Lin’s memory starts to come back. On her sweet wedding day, two other couples also embark their happily ever after.

== Release ==
Well-Intended Love was released on January 17, 2019 on Chinese streaming service Sohu. It began streaming on Netflix in May 2019. Season two wrapped production at the end of summer 2019 and was released on Sohu on February 13, 2020. Season two began streaming on Netflix in April 2020 and contains 16 episodes.

== Awards and nominations ==
Award	Category	Nominee	Results	Ref.
Golden Bud - The Fourth Network Film And Television Festival	Best Web Series	Well-Intended Love	Nominated	
Golden Bud - The Fourth Network Film And Television Festival	Top Ten Web Series	Well-Intended Love	Won	
Golden Bud - The Fourth Network Film And Television Festival	Popular Director of the Year	Wu Qiang	Won	
Golden Bud - The Fourth Network Film And Television Festival	Producer of the Year	Liu Mingli	Won	
Golden Bud - The Fourth Network Film And Television Festival	Best Actor	Xu Kaicheng	Nominated	
