= Liu Tong (actor) =

Chinese actor and model

- 刘彤
- Born: November 4, 1993 (age 32); Shandong, China
- Other name: Tonny Liu
- Occupations: Actor; model
- Years active: 2017–present
- Agent: Comic International Productions
- Height: 178 cm (5 ft 10 in)

Liu Tong (Chinese: 刘彤; pinyin: Liú Tóng, born November 4, 1993) is a Chinese actor and model. He is best known for his role of Prince Zi Yu in the 2017 web series, Men with Sword 2, as well in the 2019 web series Young Blood Agency.

== Biography ==
Liu born in Shandong, China, on November 4, 1993. He debuted as an actor in 2017, with a supporting role in the series Painting Heart Expert. Later that same year, he portrayed Prince Zi Yu in the second season of the all-male web series Men with Sword. The series was released on June 15, 2017. In 2018, he was a guest actor in web series Pretty Man and Hi, I'm Saori. In 2019, he will star in the series Young Blood Agency.

== Filmography ==
=== Web series ===
Year	Title	Role	Notes
2017	Painting Heart Expert	Tie Pi A San	Minor role
2017	Soul Stitcher	-	
2017	Men with Sword 2	Zi Yu	Minor role
2018	Pretty Man	Classmate	Guest
2018	Hi, I'm Saori	Huang Zheng	Guest
2019	Young Blood Agency	Tong Qiu Bai	Main
