= Huang Junjie =

Chinese actor

- Born: 9 July 1998 (age 28); Chongqing, China
- Education: Beijing Film Academy
- Occupation: Actor
- Years active: 2016–present
- Agent: Feibao Media

Chinese name
- Traditional Chinese: 黃俊捷
- Simplified Chinese: 黄俊捷
Transcriptions
Standard Mandarin
- Hanyu Pinyin: Huáng Jùnjié

Huang Junjie (born 9 July 1998) is a Chinese actor. He was admitted to Sichuan Mianyang Art School, majoring in theatre and film performing arts at 2014. He made his first acting debut at 24 Seconds in 2016.

== Filmography ==
=== Film ===
Year	English title	Chinese title	Role	Notes/Ref.
2018	24 Seconds	青春24秒	Du Qing	
2019	Love the Way You Are	我的青春都是你	Xiao Xi	

=== Television series ===
Year	English title	Chinese title	Role	Network	Notes/Ref.
2016	Fox in the Screen	屏里狐	Bai Sheng	Sohu TV	
2017	Forever Young	栀子花开	Gao Shang	Sohu TV	
2017	The Big Boss	班长大人	Liao Danyi	Tencent	
2018	Unexpected	来到你的世界	Gong Cheng	Tencent	
2020	Dr. Cutie	萌医甜妻	Ji Heng	Youku	
2020	Eternal Love of Dream	三生三世枕上书	Bai Zhen	Tencent	
2020	Reunion: The Sound of the Providence	重启之极海听雷	Zhang Qiling	iQiyi, Youku	
2021	Truth or Dare	花好月又圆	Mei Shiqing	Youku	
2021	Novoland: Pearl Eclipse	斛珠夫人	Zhou Youdu	Tencent	
2023	Miss Chun is a Litigator (Season 1＆2)	春家小姐是讼师（第一＆二季）	Ye Cha	IQiyi	
2024	The Spirealm	致命游戏	Ling JiuShi	iQiyi, Rakuten Viki, Viu Thailand	

=== Variety show ===
Year	English title	Chinese title	Role	Network	Notes/Ref.
2019	Everybody Stand By	演员请就位	Contestant	Tencent	

== Discography ==
Year	English title	Chinese title	Album	Notes/Ref.
2020	"Iron Triangle"	铁三角	Reunion: The Sound of the Providence OST	with Zhu Yilong & Chen Minghao

== Awards and nominations ==
Year	Awards	Category	Nominated work	Result	Ref.
2020	7th The Actors of China Award Ceremony	Best Actor (Web series)	—N/a	Nominated	
