= Dangerous (SpeXial album) =

Studio album by SpeXial
- Released: 19 August 2015 (Preorder Version); 11 September 2015 (Regular Version); 6 November 2015 (Deluxe Edition)
- Recorded: 2015
- Genre: Mandopop
- Length: 33:32
- Language: Mandarin
- Label: Warner Music Taiwan
- Producer: Jeremy Ji

SpeXial chronology
Love Killah (2015)	Dangerous (2015)	Boyz on Fire (2016)

Other Covers
- Regular Version

Alternative cover
- Deluxe Edition

Dangerous is Taiwanese Mandopop boyband SpeXial's third Mandarin studio album. The "Preorder Version" was pre-ordered from 19 August 2015. The first edition "Regular Version" was released on September 11, and the second edition "Deluxe Edition" was released on November 6. The first promotional single, "Love Guardian", is the theme song of online drama School Beauty's Personal Bodyguard. The title track is the Chinese theme song of the film Maze Runner: The Scorch Trials. "The Sweet Boys", the third promotional single, is the promotional theme song of idol drama I Am Sorry, I Love You.

The "Preorder Version" includes a tote bag, and the "Deluxe Edition" includes a 28 cm card figure (one randomly chosen from a selection of eight) and eight 28.5X28.5 cm photo cards.

== Track listing ==
No.	Title	Lyrics	Music	Length
1.	"Love Guardian" (貼身)	Peter Huang; RPG; Jerry Feng	Peter Huang; Mr.DANNY	3:10
2.	"Dangerous"	Jerry Feng	Katerina Bramley; Michael Conn; Robert Hanna	3:14
3.	"Jam"	Jerry Feng	Nicklas Eklund; Mattias Olofsson	3:25
4.	"Bad Bad Boy"	Wu I-Wei; Jeremy Ji	Jeremy Ji	3:25
5.	"Are You OK?" (有事嗎)	Peter Huang; Jerry Feng	Jeffrey Kung; Jae Chong	3:27
6.	"Showdown" (攤牌)	Jerry Feng	JerryC; Judy Chou	3:36
7.	"The Sweet Boys" (暖男製造機)	Jerry Feng	Jeremy Ji	3:23
8.	"My Lucky Star" (兩個人的博愛特區)	Jerry Feng	Matthew Tishler; Vince Degiorgio; Gustav Efraimsson	3:11
9.	"Un-Huh! Un-Huh!"	Jerry Feng	Peter Huang; Zhang Lei-Ke	3:16
10.	"Silly Girl" (犀利Girl)	Peter Huang	Jeremy Ji	3:19
Total length:				33:32

== Music videos ==
Title	Director	Date	Media
Love Guardian (貼身)	Kuang Sheng	17 August 2015	YouTube
Dangerous	Kuang Sheng	14 September 2015	YouTube
The Sweet Boys (暖男製造機)	Kuang Sheng	20 October 2015	YouTube
Silly Girl (犀利Girl)	Wang Bo-Lin	5 November 2015	YouTube
