= SpeXial (album) =

Studio album by SpeXial
- Released: 7 December 2012
- Recorded: 2012
- Genre: Mandopop
- Length: 37:55
- Language: Mandarin
- Label: Warner Music Taiwan
- Producer: Jeremy Ji

SpeXial chronology
SpeXial (2012)	Break it down (2014)

SpeXial is Taiwanese Mandopop boyband SpeXial's debut Mandarin studio album produced by Jeremy Ji, a famous Taiwanese Mandopop songwriter. It was released on 7 December 2012. The first promotional single is a lyric song "Celebrate Loneliness" (慶祝寂寞). "Gone Mad" (發飆) – SpeXial version, the theme song of Idol Drama KO one 2, is the second promotional single. The third promotional single is an electronic dance song "Super Style", which is also the theme song of Idol Drama KO One Re-act. This album was funded by "2012 Funding the Production and Marketing of Outstanding Popular Music" of Bureau of Audiovisual and Music Industry Development.

== Track listing ==
No.	Title	Lyrics	Music	Length
1.	"Super Style"	Eriky Lee	Jeremy Ji	3:34
2.	"Celebrate Loneliness" (慶祝寂寞)	Huang Wen-Hsuan	Cola@COLOR BAND	3:31
3.	"The Whole World Is Ambiguous" (全世界都曖昧)	Huang Wen-hsuan; Rap: Sam	Ten	3:22
4.	"The Best Boyfriend" (最佳男友)	Tina Wang	Zhang Chi	4:02
5.	"Strictly Prohibited To Wait" (嚴禁守候)	Huang Wen-hsuan	Johnny Shu-huan Yao	4:05
6.	"SpeXial"	MC40	Starr Chen	3:28
7.	"Like Superman" (超人一樣)	Ge Dawei	Evan Yo	4:07
8.	"Be my girl"	Cola@COLOR BAND; Wu I-Wei	Cola@COLOR BAND	3:45
9.	"Only Sing For You To Hear" (只唱給你聽)	Johnny Shu-huan Yao	Johnny Shu-huan Yao	4:35
10.	"Gone Mad (SpeXial version)" (發飆 – SpeXial版)	Wu I-Wei	Hsiao Heng-Chia	4:16
Total length:				37:55

== Music videos ==
Title	Director	Date	Media
Gone Mad (發飆)	Shawn Yu	10 December 2012	YouTube
Celebrate Loneliness (慶祝寂寞)	Bill Chia	19 December 2012	YouTube
Super Style	Bill Chia	9 January 2013	YouTube
