= Men with Sword =

- Promotional poster
- Genre: Historical; Drama; Wuxia
- Written by: Wang Wentong
- Directed by: Zhao Shiyao
- Starring: Eden Zhao; Evan Ma; Dylan Xiong; Ian Yi; Lu Yunfeng; Simon Lian; Zha Jie; Peng Yuchang; Ash Zhu; Wayne Huang; Feng Tian
- Opening theme: Sword Flying Heart by Evan Ma and Dylan Xiong
- Ending theme: Jade Moonlight by Dylan Xiong
- Country of origin: China
- Original language: Mandarin
- No. of seasons: 2
- No. of episodes: 60

Production
- Running time: 40 mins

Original release
- Network: Sohu
- Release: 14 August 2016 – 22 August 2017

Men with Sword (Chinese: 刺客列传; pinyin: Cì Kè Liè Zhuàn) is a 2016 Chinese streaming television series produced by Sohu which premiered on August 14, 2016, with 30 episodes. The all-male cast is mainly composed by members of the Taiwanese boy band SpeXial, including Eden Zhao, Evan Ma, Dylan Xiong, Ian Yi, Simon Lian, Wayne Huang and Win Feng.

A second season with thirty episodes and new cast members, was released on June 15, 2017. The series focuses on the power struggle of five different kings

== Synopsis ==
After more than three centuries, the Empire of Juntian begins to collapse, as three of the four major duchies - Tianquan, Tianshu, and Tianxuan - declare their independence. Ling Guang, the power-hungry king of Tianxuan, sends his close companion, the swordsman Qiu Zhen, to assassinate the Emperor. Although Qiu Zhen succeeds, he is tormented over his actions and kills himself in order to protect his king from malicious rumors, sending Ling Guang into a deep state of depression. The death of the Emperor prompts the final duke, Jian Bin, to declare his duchy Tianji an independent kingdom as well. In Tianshu, the warrior scholar Zhong Kunyi becomes a confidant of the young king Meng Zhang, who orders him to begin undermining Tianji. Meanwhile, a mysterious wandering musician of renowned beauty called Murong Li arrives in remote Tianquan, where he is doted upon by the naive and childish king Zhi Ming, who quickly becomes romantically obsessed with him.

An uneasy balance settles among the four kingdoms, maintained mostly by the military genius of Tianji's general Qi Zhikan and the political acumen of Tianxuan's deputy prime minister, Gongsun Qian. To everyone's surprise however, a fifth nation, Nansu, reveals itself when its king, Yu Qing, requests official recognition from the other four kingdoms. As the four swordsmen travel to Nansu, shifting alliances, deep emotions, and a carefully laid conspiracy of revenge spur the world towards war.

== Cast ==
=== Season 1 ===
- Eden Zhao as Gongsun Qian, Deputy Prime Minister of Tianxuan
- Lu Yunfeng as Ling Guang, King of Tianxuan
- Simon Lian as Qiu Zhen, warrior of Tianxuan and Ling Guang's close confidant
- Evan Ma as Jian Bin, King of Tianji
- Ian Yi as Qi Zhikan, Chief General of Tianji
- Dylan Xiong as Zhong Kunyi, agricultural minister of Tianshu
- Peng Yuchang as Meng Zhang, King of Tianshu
- Ash Zhu as Zhi Ming, King of Tianquan. He falls deeply in love with Murong Li
- Zha Jie as Murong Li, Prince of Yaoguang and the sole survivor of the Royal Family
- Wayne Huang as Yu Qing, King of Nansu
  - Lin Fengsong as Yu Qing (Season 2)
- Win Feng as Qi Kun, Emperor of Juntian
- Yang Guang as Wei Xuanchen, the Prime Minister of Tianxuan
- Ren Xuehai as Ruomu Hua, Tianji's Grand Master
- Zhu Jiazhen as Su Han, the Prime Minister of Tianshu
- Dai Xuyi as Su Yan, the nephew of Su Han and Zhong Kunyi's rival
- Hu Gaofeng as Weng Tong, Tianquan's Grand Tutor
- Guo Xin as Mo Lan, Tianquan's Magistrate, and later Governor
- Sun Yi as A-Xun, Murong Li's childhood friend and former love interest
- Qin Junzhe as Yu Yuankai, Nansu's Grand Tutor
- Li Xizi as Li Geng Chen, an assassin under the service of Murong Li

=== Season 2 ===
- Yu Yijie as Yu Xiao, Yu Qing's younger brother and later King of Nansu. He develops an unrequited love towards Murong Li
- Huang Qianshuo as Gu Shi'an, General of Tianxuan
- Xue Xianyun as Fang Ye, loyal subordinate and personal bodyguard of Murong Li
- Liu Tong as Zi Yu, Prince of Liuli
- Chen Yucheng as Gen Mo Chi, Zhong Kunyi's student
- Liang Bowen as Xiao Ran, General of Yaoguang
- Feng Jianyu as Zuo Yi, King of Kaiyang
- Xiao Meng as Qian Yuan, the talented yet mysterious inventor of Kaiyang
- Wang Yuqi as Luo Min, Zhong Kunyi's student
- Liu Yuzhong as Chu Hang, Tianxuan's loyal soldier
- Sun Chenlong as Xiao Pang, Zhi Ming's servant

== Production ==
The series was filmed during the summer of 2016. In July, the first promotional poster was released, followed by character posters and trailers in the following days.

== Reception ==
=== Critical response ===
Despite its low budget and cast of amateur actors —seven of which were members of the Taiwanese boy band SpeXial—, the series became highly successful and received generally positive reviews.

=== Vierwership ===
The show had over 200 million views during the premiere of the twelfth episode, while the whole drama accumulated 430 million views in total, becoming one of the ten most popular series of Sohu throughout its transmission.

=== Censorship ===
However, it has suffered from interference by Chinese censors. The show was taken offline after it became popular and made available again shortly after, with a number of cuts removing romantic scenes between the male characters.
