= Yu Yijie =

Chinese actor and singer

- 虞祎杰
- Born: September 1, 1995 (age 30); Wuxi, Jiangsu, China
- Other name: Yu Yijie
- Occupations: Actor; model
- Years active: 2017–present
- Agent: Comic International Productions
- Height: 183 cm (6 ft 0 in)

Yu Yijie (Chinese: 虞祎杰; pinyin: Yú Yī Jié, born September 1, 1995), is a Chinese actor and model. He is best known for his roles of king Yu Xiao in the 2017 web series, Men with Sword 2, and Xu Jiamu in Pretty Man.

== Biography ==
Yu born in Wuxi, Jiangsu, on September 1, 1995. He debuted as an actor in 2017, portraying the kind and noble king Yu Xiao in the second season of the all-male web series Men with Sword. The series was released on June 15, 2017. In 2018, he portrayed Situ Lu in the movie Spiritpact, based on the web comic of the same name. The same year, he appeared in another movie, The War Records of Deification, as well in series like Pretty Man and Hi, I'm Saori. In 2019, he will star in the series Young Blood Agency.

== Filmography ==
=== Web series ===
Year	Title	Role	Notes
2017	Men with Sword 2	Yu Xiao	Main role
2018	Pretty Man	Xu Jiamu	Main role
2018	Hi, I'm Saori	Su Yuxuan	Main role
2019	Young Blood Agency	Nan Gongshuo	Main role

=== Movies ===
Year	Title	Role	Notes
2018	Spiritpact	Situ Lu	Main role
2018	The War Records of Deification	Shen Gongbao	Main role
