= Zhu Jian (actor) =

Chinese actor and model (born 1991)

- Born: May 4, 1991 (age 35); Nantong, Jiangsu, China
- Other name: Ash Zhu
- Education: Suzhou Arts and Crafts Institute
- Occupations: Actor; model
- Years active: 2016–present
- Agent: Comic International Productions
- Notable credit: Men with Sword as Zhi Ming
- Height: 181 cm (5 ft 11 in)

Zhu Jian (Chinese: 朱戬; pinyin: Zhū Jiǎn, born May 4, 1991) is a Chinese actor and model. He is best known for his role of king Zhi Ming in the 2016 web series, Men with Sword.

== Biography ==
Zhu was born into a working-class family on May 4, 1991, in Nantong, Jiangsu. He is the second child of the family; he has an older sister. He attended Suzhou Arts and Crafts Institute and studied marketing. After his graduation, he worked for a month as a teacher at an art school, where he taught children how to paint. Later, he opened a clothing store in a shopping mall in his hometown, where he was scouted by a fashion magazine. Zhu modeled for the magazine for two years.

He debuted as an actor in 2016, portraying the childish and naive king Zhi Ming in the all-male web series Men with Sword. Zhu repeated his role in a second season of the series, which was released on June 15, 2017. He also has appeared in web series like Weapon & Soul 2, Untouchable Lovers, Tomb of the Sea, and The Legend of Hao Lan.

On January 7, 2018, he won a Golden Jubilee Award for "Best Web Series Star" of the year.

== Personal life ==
In March 2017, during a photo session for Men with Sword 2, he was accidentally injured by his co-star Zha Jie with a prop sword, which resulted in a cut in the upper eyelid of his left eye that required five stitches.

== Filmography ==
=== Web series ===
Year	Title	Role	Notes
2016	Men with Sword	Zhi Ming	Main role
2017	Weapon & Soul 2	Kong Haiyou	Minor role
2017	Men with Sword 2	Zhi Ming	Main role
2018	Untouchable Lovers	He Ji	Minor role
2018	Pretty Man	A-Wen	Guest
2018	Tomb of the Sea	Yang Hao	Minor role
2018	The Legend of Hao Lan	Lao'ai	Minor role
2022	Oops! The King is in love	Yan Jin, the emperor	Main role

=== Movies ===
Year	Title	Role	Notes
2017	Imperial Kitchen God	Zhang Jing Tang	Main
