= Novoland: Pearl Eclipse =

Chinese historical fantasy TV series

- Promotional poster
- Also known as: Mrs. Pearl Bead; 九州斛珠夫人
- Chinese: 斛珠夫人
- Hanyu Pinyin: Húzhū Fūrén
- Genre: Romance; Fantasy; Wuxia
- Created by: Xiao Ruse
- Directed by: Jin Sha
- Starring: Yang Mi; William Chan
- Country of origin: China
- Original language: Mandarin
- No. of episodes: 48

Production
- Producer: Gao Chen
- Production locations: Mainland China; Hengdian Studios
- Running time: 45 minutes
- Production company: Beijing Joy Jiaxing Film and Television Culture Co., Ltd.

Original release
- Network: Tencent, Beijing Television
- Release: 10 November – 26 December 2021

Novoland: Pearl Eclipse (Chinese: 斛珠夫人; pinyin: Húzhū Fūrén) is a Chinese historical fantasy television series starring Yang Mi and William Chan, based on Xiao Ruse's novel of the same name. It aired on Tencent Video and WeTV from 10 November 2021, and on Beijing Television channel from 13 November 2021.

== Synopsis ==
During the Zheng Dynasty, efforts to obtain the rare Naga pearl cause Ye Haishi, a girl from a fishing village, to lose her father. As the rest of her family and villagers are threatened by soldiers, the passing first minister Fang Zhu takes her under his wing as his disciple. Disguised as a male, she enters the imperial court as the emperor Zhu Zhongxu's bodyguard.

While Fang Zhu and Haishi love each other, a turn of events forces the couple apart. After Haishi’s real gender is revealed, she becomes the emperor’s consort in name and is conferred the title 'Madame Naga Pearl.'

== Cast ==
=== Main ===
- Yang Mi as Fang Haishi / Ye Haishi

A young girl who hails from a fishing village. People of the village are forced to gather Naga pearls, the tears of Naga mermaids, to pay in the form of taxes. While searching for Naga mermaids at sea, Ye Haishi and her father are attacked by sharks. She was the only survivor, saved by a Naga mermaid who goes by the name "Lang Huan". Afterwards, when the village is threatened by corrupt government officials, she sneaks an attack on the officials' leader, killing him with a single stab. On the run from other officials, she meets Fang Zhu, who offers to take her in and asks her to choose whether she wants to live as a man or woman; she chooses the former. She takes on the surname of her master, "Fang", and later develops romantic feelings for him.

- William Chan as Fang Zhu / Fang Jianming

The commander of Secret Force and the top official of the Zheng Dynasty, Lord Qinghai. As a descendant of the Liushang Fang family, Fang Zhu was sent to the royal palace to accompany the royal heirs when he was young. He and Chu Zhongxu, the current emperor, grew up together and formed a close bond. During prince Yi's rebellion, Chu Zhongxu was injured badly. To save his best friend, Fang Zhu became Zhongxu's Baixi; someone who endures all the sickness, physical pain and injuries inflicted on the host. After he recovered, Fang Zhu faked his own death and wore a mask to conceal his identity. While staying hidden, Fang Zhu protects Chu Zhongxu and works together with Chu Zhongxu to eradicate corrupt individuals in the court. He then passes by Haishi's village and takes her in as a disciple. He later develops romantic feelings for her, but keeps pushing her away.

- Xu Kaicheng as Emperor Di Xu / Zhu Zhongxu

After the Yi Rebellion, he was the only successor to the throne. Thus, he became the Emperor of the Zheng Dynasty against his own will. He has a hot temper and is dispirited, due to the loss of his first love, Zizan. He later on meets Tilan, whom he detests due to her resemblance to Zizan. He eventually develops feelings for her.

- Chen Xiaoyun as Zizan and Tilan / Consort Shurong

Zizan is Emperor Di Xu's first love and the late-empress of the Zheng dynasty. She is the princess of Zhunian.
Tilan is Zizan's sister who looks just like Zizan. Tilan was betrothed to Emperor Di Xu and bestowed the title of "Consort Shurong". The emperor hates her at first, but eventually develops feelings for her. She also develops feelings for the emperor.

- Wilson Wang as Fang Zhuoying / Duo Han and Duo Luo

Zhuoying is Fang Zhu's disciple and Haishi's martial older brother. Like Haishi, Zhuoying was also taken in by Fang Zhu when he was young. He fell in love at first sight with Ju Zheliu. He later on resumes his true identity of Duo Han and becomes the Lord of Huku's Left Wing, and eventually the King of Hangzhou.
Duo Luo is Zhuoying's / Duo Han's biological twin brother who was the previous Lord of Huku's Left Wing.

- Yuan Yuxuan as Ju Zheliu.

She worked in the palace's fabric department as a seamstress. Later on, she takes over her aunt as the Head mistress of the palace's fabric department. She is Fang Zhuoying's love interest and develops feelings for him later on.

=== Supporting ===
- Ye Qing as Zhu Linglang / Commandery Princess Fenyang.
- Zeng Yongti as Ju Qiqi, ex-head mistress of the palace's fabric department and aunt of Zheliu. She shares a one-sided love with Fang Zhu.
- Li Tai as Tang Qianzi / General Tang. He is a military general assigned to guard Huangquan pass. He is secretly in love with Ti Lan / Consort Shurong.
- Huang Junjie as Zhou Youdu, a good friend of Fang Haishi and Fang Zhuoying. He fell in love with Haishi at first sight.
- Ye Youwei as Zhu Jichang / Lord Chang, younger half brother of Emperor Di Xu.
- Han Xiuyi as Su Ming, one of the six-winged generals and Fang Zhu's enemy.

=== Special appearance ===
- Dong Xuan as Lang Huan. Mermaid who has a special bond with Haishi.

== Production ==
In November 2018, Yang Mi attended Tencent drama-round up press conference to announce her upcoming role in the Novoland franchise. Official filming began in Hengdian World Studios on 3 May 2020 and wrapped up on 20 September 2020.

== Soundtrack ==
No.	Title	Lyrics	Music	Singer	Length
1.	"The heart moved once in a life (一生一次心一动)"	Duan Sisi	Tan Xuan	Jane Zhang	5:05
2.	"Engraved (镌刻)" (Opening theme song)	Luan Jie	Tan Xuan	Zhang Bichen	4:21
3.	"Undisturbed kiss (以无旁骛之吻)" (Ending theme song)	Duan Sisi	Tan Xuan	Zhou Shen	4:20
4.	"Someone's got to stay and leave (总有离人留)"	Liu Chang	Gao Lianyue	Shuang Sheng	5:08
5.	"Birthdate (生辰)"	Duan Sisi	Tan Xuan	Zhang Lei	4:30
6.	"Drunken Flowers (醉花间)"	Duan Sisi	Tan Xuan	Li Qi	4:34
