= Feng Tian =

Japanese singer and actor

- Born: Masaya Toyota; February 12, 1992 (age 34); Aomori Prefecture, Japan
- Other names: Win Feng, Win
- Occupations: Actor; singer; model
- Years active: 2015–present
- Agent: Comic International Productions
- Height: 189 cm (6 ft 2 in)

Feng Tian (Chinese: 風田, born February 12, 1992), also known as Win Feng, is a Japanese actor, singer and model. He is a member of the Taiwanese boyband SpeXial since 2015. His real name is Masaya Toyota (豐田將也, Masaya Toyota).

== Biography ==
Tian was born in Aomori Prefecture, Japan on February 12, 1992. He began his career as a model and participated in many international fashion shows. In the second half of 2014, he joined the Taiwanese boy band SpeXial alongside two other new members. He debuted in SpeXial under the English name of "Win" on January 13, 2015. In the group, he performs as vocalist.

As an actor, he is best known for his roles in web series like Men with Sword, KO One Re-member and KO One Re-call.

== Filmography ==
=== Television ===
Year	Title	Role	Notes
2016	KO One Re-member	Shen Mi	Main
2018	KO One Re-call	Shen Mi	Main

=== Web series ===
Year	Title	Role	Notes
2016	Men with Sword	Emperor Qi Kun	Guest (episode 1)

=== Movies ===
Year	Title	Role	Notes
2016	My Egg Boy	Japanese Man	Guest
