= Ian Yi =

Taiwanese singer, rapper and actor

- Born: Yi Pochen; October 24, 1996 (age 29); Shilin District, Taipei, Taiwan
- Other names: Yi En, Ian
- Education: Nan Chiang Industrial & Commercial Senior High School
- Occupations: Actor; singer; rapper; dancer
- Years active: 2015–present
- Agent: Comic International Productions
- Height: 182 cm (6 ft 0 in)

Yi Pochen (Chinese: 易柏辰; Pe̍h-ōe-jī: Ia̍h Pek-sîn, born October 24, 1996), known professionally as Ian Yi, is a Taiwanese actor, singer, rapper and dancer. He is a member of the Taiwanese boyband SpeXial.

== Biography ==
Yi Pochen was born in Shilin District, Taipei on October 24, 1996. He has two younger siblings; a sister and a brother who is ten years younger. He attended Nan Chiang Industrial & Commercial Senior High School, where he graduated with a master's degree in performing arts. In the second half of 2014, after receiving two years of training, he joined the Taiwanese boy band SpeXial alongside two other new members. He debuted in SpeXial under the English name of "Ian" on January 13, 2015. In the group, he performs as a rapper and dancer. As the youngest member of the group, his fans nicknamed him "Little Star".

As an actor, he is best known for his roles in web series like Men with Sword, Stardom, K.O.3an Guo, Kai Feng Qi Tan,Well-Intended Love, and Killer and Healer.

== Filmography ==
=== Film ===
Year	English title	Chinese title	Role	Notes
2014	Girlfriend	女;朋友		Short film
2017	The Super Royal Highness	超级王爷	Xiao Yan	
2017	The War Records of Deification	封神战纪	Jiang Shan / Lu Wang	

=== Television series ===
Year	English title	Chinese title	Role	Notes
2012	The M Riders 4	萌学园4时空战役	Dark Black Man	Cameo
2014	GTO	麻辣教师GTO	Student	Cameo
2016	Men with Sword	刺客列传	Qi Zhikan	
2016	Stardom	明星志愿	Chen Yifu	
2017	Stardom 2	明星志愿2	Chen Yifu	
2017	Legend of the Little Monk 2	降龙伏虎小济公2	Cheng Feng-lin	
2017	K.O.3an Guo	终极三国2017	Ma Chao	
2018	Kai Feng Qi Tan	开封奇谈	Zhan Zhao	
2018	Little Brother Has a Demon	小哥哥有妖气	Little rabbit	Episodes 7-8
2019	Well-Intended Love	奈何BOSS要娶我	Chu Yan	
2019	Your Highness 2	拜见宫主大人2	Jing Tian	Guest appearance (Episode 6–7)
2019	Young Blood Agency	民国少年侦探社	Ye Yichen	Guest appearance
2019	Xing Zuo Zhi Shou Ren	星座值守恋人	Chen Jiajia	
2019	The Romance of Hua Rong	一夜新娘	Jin Yiwen	
2020	Well-Intended Love 2	奈何BOSS要娶我2	Chu Yan	
2020	Killer and Healer	恨君不似江楼月	Chen Yuzhi	
2020	Love Is Written In The Stars	看见缘分的少女	Ning Lan	
2021	Once We Get Married	只是结婚的关系	Mo Zixin	
2021	The Women Walk The Line	我们的当打之	Zheng Jinnan	
TBA	108 Unordinaries	108异人录	Wu Song	
TBA	The King of Tomb	墓王之王	Luo Shiqiu	

== Discography ==
Year	English title	Chinese title	Album	Notes
2017	"I Am Your Super King"	我是你的super王	The Super Royal Highness OST	
2017	"Nameless Warrior"	无名将	Men with Sword 2 OST	
2017	"Stopping Gentleness"	止步温柔		Birthday single
2017	"Big Shot"	大人物	Kai Feng Qi Tan OST	
2018	"Winter Half"	冬半		Birthday single
2019	"Little Stars"	小星星	Zhong Er Bing Hui Chuan Ran OST	

== Awards and nominations ==
Year	Award	Category	Nominated work	Results	Ref.
2018	Golden Bud - The Third Network Film And Television Festival	Most Promising Actor	—N/a	Won	
