= KO One Re-Call =

- Also known as: 終極一班5; Zhōng Jí Yī Bān 5
- Genre: School, Comedy, Fantasy, Action, Romance, Wuxia
- Directed by: Ke Zheng Ming (柯政銘)
- Starring: Win; Brent; Evan Ma; Wes; Wayne Huang; Zhiwei; Sylvia Wang; Calvin Chen; Tsai Yi-chen; Sunnee
- Opening theme: "Buddy Buddy" by SpeXial
- Ending theme: "匆匆" by KOGIRLS
- Country of origin: Republic of China (Taiwan)
- Original language: Mandarin
- No. of episodes: 60

Production
- Production location: Taipei, Taiwan
- Running time: 30 mins

Original release
- Network: IQiyi Taiwan
- Release: January 22 – February 26, 2018

Related
- KO One; The X-Family; K.O.3an Guo; KO One Return; KO One Re-act; The X-Dormitory; Angel 'N' Devil; KO One Re-member; K.O.3an Guo 2017

KO One Re-Call (Chinese: 終極一班5; pinyin: Zhōng Jí Yī Bān 5; literally: "The Ultimate Class 5") is a 2018 Taiwanese drama starring Win, Brent, Evan Ma, Wes, Wayne Huang, Zhiwei, Sylvia Wang, Calvin Chen and Tsai Yi-chen. It was produced by Comic International Productions (可米國際影視事業股份有限公司), it started filming in April 2017 and wrapped on August 4, 2017. it was first broadcast in Taiwan on iQiyi Taiwan on January 22, 2018, to February 26, 2018.

== Synopsis ==
The war between Iron Dimension and Mojie is still ongoing and the fighters from Gold Dimension are trapped between the inter-dimensional rift, leaving behind the badly injured Gu Zhan, guilt ridden Qiu Qiu, and class of KO One on the verge of falling apart. The KO One Class is leaderless with Lei Ting(King) leaves for the Iron Dimension to help Wang Da Dong. She appoints authority of the class to the new student Lan Si Luo who she befriends. At same time, the legendary Wang Ya Se returned to KO One as their newest homeroom teacher with a mission to send the class to college which was Da Dong's ultimate mission. and having a secret he hides from the KO One Class.

== Cast ==
=== Main characters ===
- Evan Ma as Lan Si Luo 藍斯洛, Known as Cold Commander, he became current leader of KO One Class at King's request to watch over the class after she left Gold Dimension to aide Wang Da Dong in the Iron Dimension's war against Mojie. He is also the older cousin of Tai Yang.
- Calvin Chen as Wang Ya Se王亞瑟, One of Da Dong's best friend. He return to Ba Le High School as the newest homeroom teacher of KO One with a mission to send the class to college which was Da Dong's ultimate mission. and having a secret he hides from the KO One Class. He currently married to Cai Wu Xiong.
- Wang Yi Wen as Qiu Qiu 裘球 KO.7, ex-girlfriend of Gu Zhan. She became guilt-ridden after Gu Zhan was badly injured while protecting her on an escort mission to the Iron Dimension. Though they go their separate ways, they still care for another. Her break up with Gu Zhan causes her to visit a company called 'Negative Energy'. There, she is brainwashed to believe in negative values such as: 'two negative equates to a positive,' 'by not hoping, there is hope','Things will only get worse,' Etc. As the series progress she becomes chaotic and negative, often mentions thing that make people depressed. She begins to find pleasure in painful situations. Under the guidance of the CEO of the 'Negative Energy' company she eventually becomes demonic.

"Zhong Ji Yi Ban" (Ko One) Class

- Pets Tseng as Lei Ting (雷婷) (King), KO.3, previous leader of the "Zhong Ji Yi Ban" (KO One Class) left for Iron Dimension to aide Wang Da Dong in the Iron Dimension's war against Mojie. (Guest Star)
- Luo Hong Zheng as Gu Zhan 辜戰 KO. 3, best friend of Zhi Ge, ex-boyfriend of Qiu Qiu. He got badly injured on an escort mission with the KO One class to the Iron Dimension. Gu Zhan is further injured while attempting to save King and Zhi Ge. He succeeds in his mission, but his life is endangered, and is then 'frozen' in an attempt to save him. (Guest Star)
- Wayne Huang as Zhi Ge 止戈 KO.2, best friend of Gu Zhan. He and Lei Ting got separated from the KO ONE class during escort mission to the Iron dimension. (Guest Star)
- Jiang Rui Ze (蒋蕊泽) as Tai Yang 太陽, younger cousin of Lan Si Luo. She and Shen Mi became more closer to each other in this season.
- Xiao Hou as what's-his-name 那個誰 KO.6
- Zhang Hao Ming as Jin Bao San 金寶三, a 28-year-old high school repeat, prankster and comic relief, old classmate of Da Dong and Ya Se.
- Jin Zhong Xi (金中西) as Xiao Hu 小虎, new student of KO One and friend of Tong Tong. His dream is to be a powerful fighter. Likes to challenge powerful or famous fighters.
- Chen Shi Min (陳詩敏) as Tong Tong 童桐, new student of KO One and friend of Xiao Hu.
- Hu Wei Ji as Shang Ban Sheng

The faculty

- Hsia Ching Ting as Jia Yong 賈勇/疯龙, the current principal of Ba Le High School and a Demon
- Ye Hui Zhi (葉蕙芝) as Gu Wen Jing 古文靜, Chinese teacher at Ba Le High School and wife of Jia Yong

Fig High School

- Sunnee Yang as Lan Si Chun, adoptive young sister of Lan Si Luo. She is secretly working for a mysterious villain who seems to be enemy of Duan Chang Ren, Hei Long, Zhi Shu and KO One class.

Other characters

- Bernice Tsai as Wu Xiong, former classmate of Da Dong, Jin Bao San and the wife of Wang Ya Se. It seems that she suffered rapid aging because of the lack of the Bear Pearl and its illness only had been temporarily suppressed. Wang Ya Se is desperate to try finding a cure for her.
- Sam Lin as Wan Shuang Long, a brutal, reckless and fierce antagonist. He grew up in an underground fighting field. A great reward was to be given to the one who could find Wan Shuang Long's whereabouts. Gu Zhan took the initiative and searched for 3 days and 3 nights and handed him over to the police. After two years in the Detention Center, he was finally released. The first thing he did after getting out of prison was to take his revenge! The alternate counterpart of Zhong Wan Jun from unknown dimension who now lives in Gold Dimension. Minor antagonist who is the enemy of Gu Zhan and KO One Class.
- Xu Ming Jie as Bi Ling, deity of a golden pen owned by Jin Bao San. Strangely his appearance looks identical to Hua Ling Long which other character mistaken him for when they first meet.
- Chien Te-men as Lao Qian, Manager of the Weapon Station
- Wang Yi Ling (王轶玲) as Wang Ma Li 王瑪麗, School Food store owner. Girlfriend of Hei Long. Previous worked for Zhi Shu.
- Na Wei Xun as Duan Chang Ren 斷腸人, twin brother of Hei Long. Friend of Zhi Shu and Wang Ya Se
- Na Wei Xun as Hei Long, twin brother of Duan Chang Ren.
- Qin Yang (秦楊) as Zhi Shui 止水, an overprotective father of Zhi Ge and businessman. Old friend of Duan Chang Ren and Hei Long.
- Lucia Chen as Xiao Ba

== Music ==
No.	Title	Singer	Length
1.	"Buddy Buddy"	SpeXial
2.	"匆匆"	KOGIRLS
3.	"偷偷"	KOGIRLS
4.	"最難的溫柔"	Wes, Evan
