= Love Killah =

EP by SpeXial
- Released: 21 January 2015 (Fan Meeting Pre-Order Edition); 4 February 2015 (Deluxe Edition); 24 March 2015 (Fan Meeting Live Edition)
- Recorded: 2014
- Genre: Mandopop
- Length: 13:59
- Language: Mandarin
- Label: Warner Music Taiwan
- Producer: Jeremy Ji

SpeXial chronology
Break it down (2014)	Love Killah (2015)	Dangerous (2015)

Other Covers
- Deluxe Edition

Alternative cover
- Fan Meeting Live Edition

Love Killah is Taiwanese Mandopop boyband SpeXial's first Mandarin extended play (EP+DVD). The "Fan Meeting Pre-Order Edition" was pre-ordered from 21 January 2015. The first edition "Deluxe Edition" was released on February 4, and the second edition "Fan Meeting Live Edition" was released on March 24.

Having added three more members since its last release, this new EP features as its title track, a high-energy electronic dance tune. The second promotional single, "Missing U", received over 60 thousand votes and ranked No.1 on "TVBS Global Chinese Music" for seven weeks.

A DVD containing making-of footage is included in all three editions. In addition, "Deluxe Edition" includes a 76-page photo album, while "Fan Meeting Live Edition" includes a 32-page lyrics booklet, a bonus DVD containing footage from SpeXial's 7 February 2015 fan meeting at National Taiwan University Sports Center and photo cards with members' messages printed on the back.

== Track listing ==
No.	Title	Lyrics	Music	Length
1.	"Love Killah"	Jerry Feng	Bruce R.F.Smith; Mats Ymell; D Gruter	03:49
2.	"Break It Down 11.11"	Jerry Feng	Jeremy Ji	03:12
3.	"Overdose" (過癮)	Wu I-Wei	Lucas Secon Tebey; Don Mclean	03:39
4.	"Missing U" (迷失in U)	Jerry Feng	Jeremy Ji	03:19
Total length:				13:59

== Music videos ==
Title	Director	Date	Media
Love Killah	Kuang Sheng	19 January 2015	YouTube
Missing U (迷失in U)	Kuang Sheng	7 February 2015	YouTube
