= Boyz on Fire =

Studio album by SpeXial
- Released: 20 July 2016 (Fire Edition, Pink Edition); 12 August 2016 (Shining Edition)
- Recorded: 2016
- Genre: Mandopop
- Length: 37:03
- Language: Mandarin
- Label: Warner Music Taiwan
- Producer: Jerry Feng

SpeXial chronology
Dangerous (2015)	Boyz on Fire (2016)

Other Covers
- Pink Edition

Alternative cover
- Shining Edition

Boyz on Fire is Taiwanese Mandopop boyband SpeXial's fourth Mandarin studio album. The press conference of this album was held on July 19. The album was preordered from July 20 (Fire Edition, Pink Edition), and then released on August 12 (Shining Edition). The title track is the theme song of the idol drama KO ONE: RE-MEMBER. The second promotional single is "When Grief Strikes".

The title track "Boyz on Fire" is listed at number 59 on Hit Fm Taiwan's Hit Fm Annual Top 100 Singles Chart (Hit-Fm年度百首單曲) for 2016. The "Fire Edition" comes with a 96-page photobook, while the "Pink Edition" includes a 32-page photobook. The "Shining Edition" includes a 36-page photo lyric book. The album was ranked No. 1 in Five Top Ranking (week 33 of year 2016) in the first week after release.

== Track listing ==
No.	Title	Lyrics	Music	Length
1.	"Boyz on Fire"	Jeremy Ji; Jerry Feng	Jeremy Ji	3:42
2.	"Exclusive News" (獨家頭條)	Wu I-Wei; Joshua Leung	Joshua Leung	3:21
3.	"When Grief Strikes" (憂傷來襲)	Peter Huang; Jerry Feng; Rap: Evan, Riley	Tsai Chih-Hao; Victor Wai-Tak Lau	3:59
4.	"Love's Attachment" (愛的附加檔案)	Yu Chen-Mao	Teng Shao	3:38
5.	"Fire Flame"	Sean Li; Rap: Evan, Riley	David Anthony Eames; Valeria Del Prete	3:31
6.	"Really Really"	Wu I-Wei	Kim Daniel; Kudo Tomokazu	3:12
7.	"Another Day"	Sun Yi-En	JAY&TAE MU	4:06
8.	"Sun & Moon" (小太陽大月亮)	Peter Huang	Peter Huang; Liao Jin-Yi	3:25
9.	"Glorious"	Peter Huang	Peter Huang	4:03
10.	"Knight" (大俠)	Jerry Feng	Peter Huang; Mr.DANNY	4:06
Total length:				37:03

== Music videos ==
Title	Director	Date	Media
Boyz on Fire	Kuang Sheng	19 July 2016	YouTube
When Grief Strikes (憂傷來襲)	Kuang Sheng	10 August 2016	YouTube
