= Taipei City University of Science and Technology =

University in Taipei, Taiwan

- 臺北城市科技大學
- Motto: 忠信篤敬 (Chinese); Pe̍h-ōe-jī: Tiong-sìn Tok-kèng
- Motto in English: Loyalty, Trust, Sincerity, and Respect
- Type: Private
- Established: 1971
- President: Lien Hsin-chung (連信仲)
- Location: Beitou, Taipei, Taiwan; 25°07′57.1″N 121°28′10.8″E
- Campus: Suburb
- Website: www.tpcu.edu.tw

Taipei City University of Science and Technology
- Traditional Chinese: 臺北城市科技大學
Transcriptions
Standard Mandarin
- Hanyu Pinyin: Táiběi Chéngshì Kējì Dàxué
Southern Min
- Hokkien POJ: Tâi-pak Siâⁿ-chhī Kho-ki Tāi-ha̍k

The Taipei City University of Science and Technology (TPCU; Chinese: 臺北城市科技大學; pinyin: Táiběi Chéngshì Kējì Dàxué) is a technological university located in Beitou District, Taipei, Taiwan.

The university offers undergraduate and graduate programs in various fields, including engineering, business, design, humanities, and social sciences. It is divided into six colleges: the College of Engineering, College of Electrical Engineering and Computer Science, College of Business, College of Design, College of Humanities and Social Sciences, and the College of Innovation and Entrepreneurship Education.

== History ==
TPCU's original name "Kuang Wu" is derived from Emperor Guangwu of Han. After entering the 21st century, new school names such as "Northern Taiwan" and "Taipei" were successively used.

=== Junior college ===
- 1971: Kuang Wu Industry Junior College (光武工業專科學校; 光武工專)
- 1994: Kuang Wu Industry and Commerce Junior College (光武工商專科學校; 光武專校)

=== Technological institute ===
- 2000: Kuang Wu Institute of Technology (光武技術學院)
- 2004: Northern Taiwan Institute of Science and Technology (北台科學技術學院)
- 2006: Technology and Science Institute of Northern Taiwan (北台湾科學技術學院)

=== Technological university ===
- 2012: Taipei Chengshih University of Science and Technology (臺北城市科技大學)
- 2015: Taipei City University of Science and Technology (臺北城市科技大學)

== Faculties ==
- College of Engineering
- College of Business and Management
- College of Human Ecology

== Transportation ==
The university is accessible within walking distance north west of Zhongyi Station of Taipei Metro.

== Notable people ==
- Alien Huang - Taiwanese singer, actor, television presenter, illustrator and fashion designer
- Ming Jie - Taiwanese actor and singer
- Kent Tsai - Taiwanese actor
- Huang Hsiu-meng – member of the Legislative Yuan

== See also ==
- List of universities in Taiwan
