= Diana Wang =

Dutch Mandopop singer

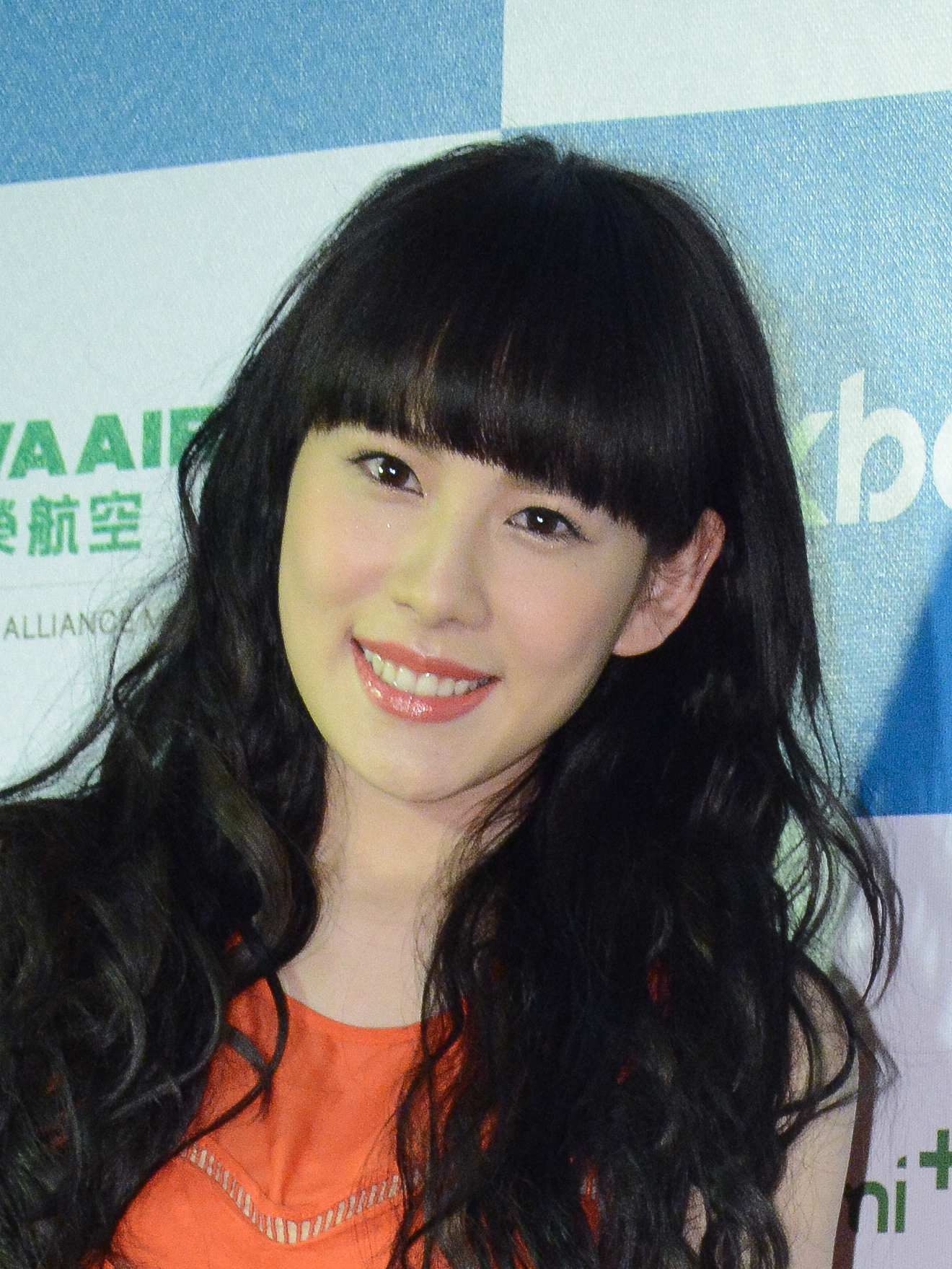
- Wang in 2014

Background information
- Born: Chu Lan-ting; 14 November 1990 (age 35); Gorinchem, Netherlands
- Genres: Mandopop
- Occupation: Singer
- Instrument: Voice
- Years active: 2013–present

Chinese name
- Traditional Chinese: 王詩安
Transcriptions
Standard Mandarin
- Hanyu Pinyin: Wáng Shī'ān
Southern Min
- Hokkien POJ: Ông Si-an

Diana Wang (born 14 November 1990) is a Dutch singer.

== Early life and education ==
Wang was born Chu Lan-ting (朱蘭亭) on 14 November 1990 in Gorinchem, Netherlands, with ancestry from Shanghai.

== Musical career ==
Wang signed with Warner Records after competing in the 7th season of One Million Star. She released her debut album, How Are You Love Lesson on 23 August 2013.

== Discography ==
- How Are You Love Lesson? (2013)
- Poems (2017)
