= Zha Jie =

Chinese actor and model (born 1994)

- Chinese: 查杰
- Born: April 11, 1994 (age 32); Anhui, China
- Education: Hefei University
- Occupations: Actor; model
- Years active: 2016–present
- Agent: Comic International Productions
- Notable credit: Men with Sword as Murong Li
- Height: 180 cm (5 ft 11 in)

Zha Jie (Chinese: 查杰; pinyin: Zhā Jié, born April 11, 1994) is a Chinese actor and model. He is best known for his role of prince Murong Li in the 2016 web series, Men with Sword.

== Biography ==
Zha Jie was born in Anhui, China on April 11, 1994. He attended and graduated from Hefei University and debuted as an actor in 2016, portraying the sly and vengeful prince Murong Li in the all-male web series Men with Sword. He repeated his role in a second season of the series, which was released on June 15, 2017. He also has appeared in web series like Pretty Man (as a guest), Little Brother Has a Demon, and Heaven Rule.

On April 11, 2017, he debuted as a singer with the release of his first single, He Qiu. On April 25, he won an Annual Newcomer Award, an award given annually to the best new artist. In 2018, he starred in the web movie The Deep Palace Honey.

== Filmography ==
=== Web series ===
Year	Title	Role	Notes
2016	Men with Sword	Murong Li	Main role
2017	Men with Sword 2	Murong Li	Main role
2018	Pretty Man	Class President	Guest
2018	Little Brother Has a Demon	Himself	Guest
2019	Heaven Rule	–	Main role

=== Movies ===
Year	Title	Role	Notes
2018	The Deep Palace Honey	Jing Tai	Main role
2018	Legend of the White Snake	Xu Xian	Main role
