= Break It Down (album) =

Break it down

Studio album by SpeXial
- Released: 12 June 2014 (First Edition); 1 August 2014 (Deluxe Edition)
- Recorded: 2014
- Genre: Mandopop
- Length: 36:57
- Language: Mandarin
- Label: Warner Music Taiwan
- Producer: Jeremy Ji, Jon Ma

SpeXial chronology
SpeXial (2012)	Break it down (2014)	Love Killah (2015)

Other Cover
- Deluxe Edition

Break it down is Taiwanese Mandopop boyband SpeXial's second Mandarin studio album. The press conference of this album was held on June 5. The album was released on June 12, and the second edition "Deluxe Edition" was released on August 1. The title track is a high-octane dance number that serves as the theme song to the idol drama The X-Dormitory. The album also features "Subtle Love", the theme song to Moon River, a Taiwanese-Chinese idol drama.

The first edition includes a 36-page photobook, while the "Deluxe Edition" includes a 32-page photo+lyric booklet, photo cards with messages from the members and a member support fan (one randomly selected from seven designs).

The album was ranked No. 3 in Five Top Ranking (week 24 of year 2014) in the first week after release, and then ranked No. 2 in the second week.

== Track listing ==
No.	Title	Lyrics	Music	Length
1.	"Fight for love" (為愛戰鬥)	Wu I-Wei	Nermin Harambasic; Erik Lewander; Shaka Loveless	3:24
2.	"Break it down"	Gavin Lin	Park Sang Il	3:29
3.	"Subtle love" (愛這種離譜感覺)	Jerry Feng	Son Ju Young; Han Jae Wook; Kim Tae-hoon	3:24
4.	"Love flu" (心流感)	Stanley Hung	Zhangjian Jun-Wei	3:11
5.	"Can't breathe without you" (愛不再呼吸)	Stanley Hung	Chris K	4:33
6.	"X" (X未知數)	Luke Tsui	Marcus Winther-John; Grace Tither; Martin Larsson	3:31
7.	"Increasingly love" (愛上加愛)	Wu I-Wei	Morten Jarl Nielsen; Jakob Kjer; Albi Albertsson	3:06
8.	"Memory collage" (拼貼記憶)	Lin Yun Ting; Jon Ma	Jon Ma	4:29
9.	"Run away with me" (陪我逃跑)	Yu Cheng-Hao; Zhangjian Jun-Wei	Yu Cheng-Hao; Zhangjian Jun-Wei	3:32
10.	"Just be friends" (只能當朋友)	Sung Yun-Ching	Hong Junyang	4:18
Total length:				36:57

== Music videos ==
Title	Director	Date	Media
Break it down	Kuang Sheng	3 June 2014	YouTube; Yahoo!
Subtle love (愛這種離譜感覺)	Kuang Sheng	14 July 2014	YouTube
Can't breathe without you (愛不再呼吸)	Kuang Sheng	23 August 2014	YouTube
X (X未知數)	Kuang Sheng	22 September 2014	YouTube
Memory collage (拼貼記憶)	Kuang Sheng	24 September 2014	YouTube
