= National Taiwan University Sports Center =

Indoor arena in Taipei, Taiwan

- 臺大綜合體育館
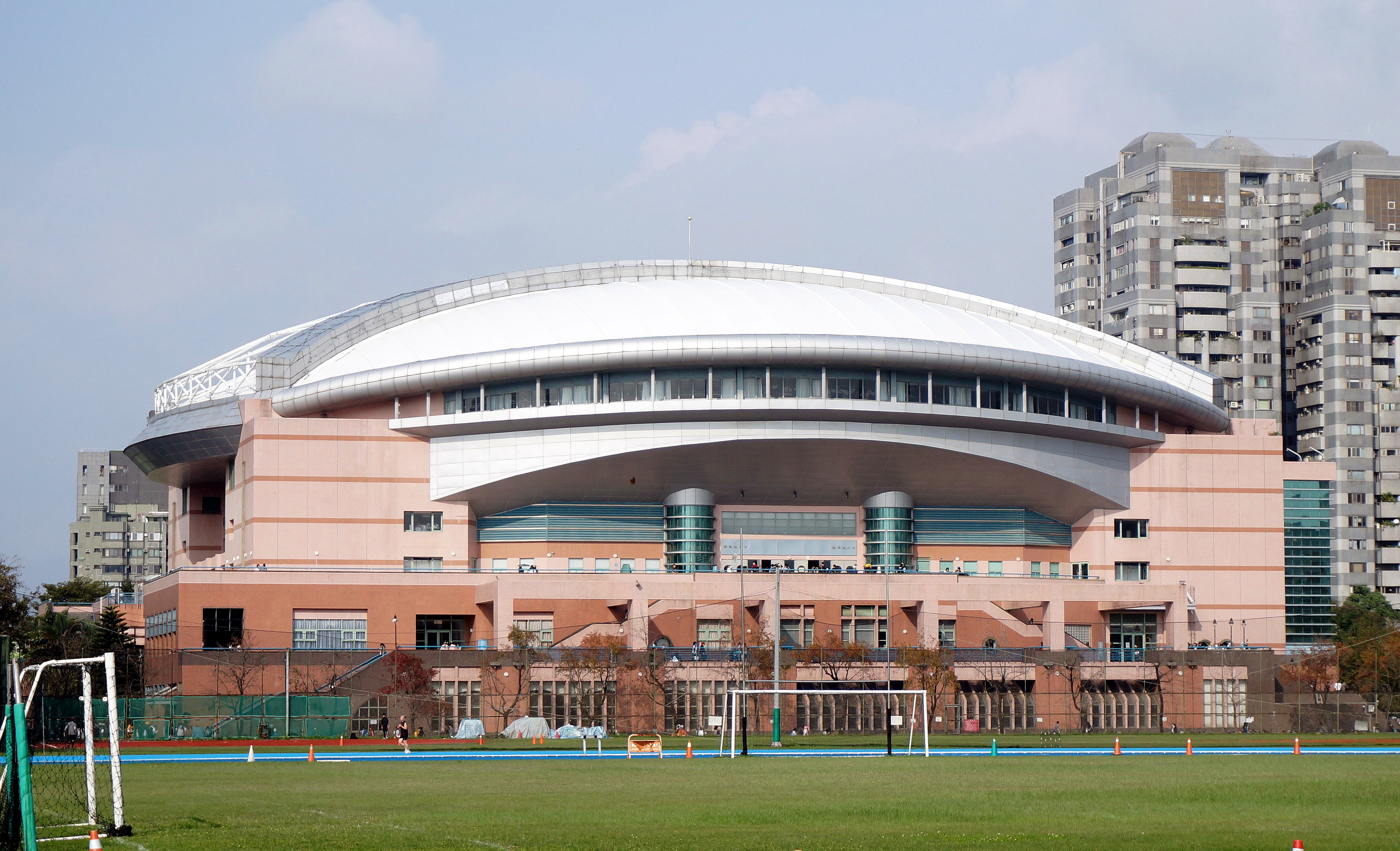
- National Taiwan University Sports Center in December 2020
- Interactive map of National Taiwan University Sports Center
- Location: Da'an, Taipei, Taiwan
- Coordinates: 25°1′17″N 121°32′6″E
- Owner: National Taiwan University
- Operator: National Taiwan University
- Capacity: 4,200
- Public transit: Taipower Building

Construction
- Groundbreaking: July 1995
- Opened: 2001
- Architect: Shen Zuhai United Architects

Tenant
- Taipei Mars (T1) (2024)

Website
- ntusportscenter.ntu.edu.tw

The National Taiwan University Sports Center (Chinese: 臺大綜合體育館; pinyin: Táidà Zònghé Tǐyùguǎn) is a major multi-purpose indoor arena in National Taiwan University, Taipei City, Taiwan. It was built by and is now managed by National Taiwan University. The sports center has 4,200 seats. This sports center has multiple badminton courts, pingpong tables, a swimming pool, gym, and many multipurpose rooms that are used for different types of sports.

== Notable events ==
- 2004 FIFA Futsal World Championship.
- 2010 FIVB Volleyball World Grand Prix
- 2014 League of Legends World Championship

Events and tenants
Preceded by Domo Polideportivo de la CDAG; Guatemala City	FIFA Futsal World Championship; Final Venue; 2004	Succeeded by Maracanãzinho; Rio de Janeiro
