= Fahrenheit filmography =

Fahrenheit is a Taiwanese Mandopop vocal quartet boy band who debut in 2005. The band consists of four members: Calvin Chen, Jiro Wang, Wu Chun, and Aaron Yan. They starred in a variety of Taiwanese dramas prior to the release of their self-titled debut album Fahrenheit.

== Drama series ==
Air date	Name	Fahrenheit's participation				Co-stars
Air date	Name	Calvin Chen	Jiro Wang	Wu Chun	Aaron Yan	Co-stars
2002	聽笨金魚唱歌		X			
2003	新麻辣鮮師; Spicy Teacher		X			
October; 2004	第八號當舖; The Pawnshop No. 8		X			Alex To; Tian Xin; Penny Lin
December; 2004	安室愛美惠; I Love My Wife				X (guest star)	Mathilda Tao; Joe Cheng
July; 2005	惡作劇之吻; It Started with a Kiss	X (cameo)	X	X (cameo)	X (minor role)	Ariel Lin; Joe Cheng
November; 2005	終極一班; KO One	X	X	X (guest star)	X	Melody; Sunnie Huang; Danson Tang
June; 2006	東方茱麗葉; Tokyo Juliet			X		Ariel Lin; Simon Yam
November; 2006	花樣少年少女; Hanazakarino Kimitachihe		X	X		Ella (S.H.E); Danson Tang
August; 2007	終極一家; The X-Family	X	X	X (guest star)	X	Pauline Lan; Danson Tang; Sunnie Huang
September; 2007	公主小妹; Romantic Princess	X		X		Angela Chang; George Hu; Eric Li Ang Lin
December; 2007	惡作劇2吻; They Kiss Again		X		X	Ariel Lin; Joe Cheng
May; 2008	翻滾吧！蛋炒飯; Rolling Love		X			Danson Tang; Genie Chuo
July; 2008	篮球火; Hot Shot			X		Jerry Yan; Show Lo
November; 2008	霹靂MIT; Mysterious Incredible Terminator				X	Gui Gui; Alien Huang; Lu Ting Wei; Christine Fan
February; 2009	愛就宅一起; ToGetHer		X			Rainie Yang; George Hu
February; 2009	終極三國; K.O.3an Guo	X (guest star)	X (guest star)		X (guest star)	George Hu; Xiu; Kirsten Ren
October; 2009	桃花小妹; Momo Love	X	X		(Note: Yan was originally signed to star with Gui Gui of Hey Girl but was replaced by Wang after filming was postponed)	Cyndi Wang; Ken Chu; Wong JingLun
October; 2010	死神少女; Gloomy Salad Days				X	Serena Fang; Lollipop; Choc7
December; 2010	愛似百匯; Love Buffet	X			X	Reen Yu; Patty Hou; Chen De Xiu
2011	陽光天使; Sunshine Angel	X (guest star)	X (guest star)	X	X (guest star)	Rainie Yang
2012	絕對達令; Absolute Darling		X	(Note: Wu was originally signed to star but in May 2011 was replaced by Wang after pulling out of the project.)		Ku Hye-sun
2012	終極一班 2 KO One Return		X			Pets Tseng
2013	終極一班 3 KO One Re-Act		X			Pets Tseng

== Movies ==
Movie Release	Name	Fahrenheit's Participation				Co-Stars
Movie Release	Name	Calvin Chen	Jiro Wang	Wu Chun	Aaron Yan	Co-Stars
9 October 2008	劍蝶; Butterfly Lovers			X		Charlene Choi; Hu Ge; Harlem Yu
4 February 2010	錦衣衛; 14 Blades			X		Donnie Yen; Zhao Wei; Kate Tsui; Qi Yuwu
8 September 2011	大武生; My Kingdom			X		Barbie Shu; Han Geng
2012	紫宅; The Purple House		X			佟麗婭
14 November 2013	他她他; 3 Peas In A Pod	X				Alexander Lee; Jae Liew
