= Dong Cheng Wei =

Taiwanese rock band

Dong Cheng Wei 東城衛
- Also known as: DJ-WIS; KARMA 火紋
- Origin: Republic of China
- Genres: Mandarin Pop, Rock
- Years active: 1999 - 2014 ( DCW), 2014 - 2020 (Red generation)
- Label: Warner Music
- Members: Shu Chen 陳德修, Ming Li 李明翰, Dum Deng 鄧樺敦, Michael Chen 陳志介 (sometimes with Jiro Wang)

Dong Cheng Wei (Chinese: 東城衛; pinyin: Dong Cheng Wei) is a Taiwanese rock band. It was an underground band that was formed during the band members' high school years. It gain a certain amount of popularity because of the success of the lead vocal, Jiro Wang and the TV appearances on KO One, The X-Family, K.O.3an Guo, KO One Return, KO One Re-act, The X-Dormitory, Angel 'N' Devil and KO ONE: RE-MEMBER.

== Television appearance ==
Year	Title	Role
2005	KO One 終極一班	Minor Role: Dong Cheng Wei 東城衛 (A band that helps increase the fighting points)/ Wang Da Dong (Jiro Wang)
2007	The X-Family 終極一家	Hu Yan Jue Luo Xiu 呼延覺羅•脩 (Shu Chen) / Dong Cheng Wei 東城衛 (the band) / Wang Da Dong / Xia Tian /Zack (Jiro Wang).
2009	K.O.3an Guo 終極三國	Liu Bei 劉備 / Hu Yan Jue Luo Xiu 呼延覺羅•脩 (Shu Chen) / Dong Cheng Wei 東城衛 (the band) / Wang Da Dong / Sun Ce (Jiro Wang)
2010	Love Buffet 愛似百匯	阿基 A Ji (Shu Chen) / Dong Cheng Wei 東城衛 (the band)
2012	KO One Return 終極一班2	Hu Yan Jue Luo Xiu 呼延覺羅•脩 (Shu Chen) / Wang Da Dong (Jiro Wang)
2013	KO One Re-act 終極一班3	Hu Yan Jue Luo Xiu 呼延覺羅•脩 (Shu Chen) / Wang Da Dong (Jiro Wang)
2014	Angel 'N' Devil	Chen De Xiu(Shu) as Wei Yi
2016	KO ONE: RE-MEMBER 終極一班4	Hu Yan Jue Luo Xiu 呼延覺羅•脩 (Shu Chen)

== Biography ==
In 1998, the bandleader/guitarist Shu and bassist Deng formed the band.

In 2000, Jiro actively joined the band.

The name of the band had changed 3 times. Karma was the original name. DJ-WIS was a name taken from the first letter of the band members' English names: "DJ-WIS" (Dun, Jiro, Will, Iyhon, Shu).

In between their active years, the band once disbanded due to various reasons: Jiro Wang's throat problem and his busy schedule of filming, band members continue with their studying in school, etc. But the band reunited of filming The X-Family. Shu Chen also composed some songs in The X-Family OST.

The current band title is a dedication of saying "Dong Cheng's Band" ('Dong Cheng' is Jiro Wang's Chinese name).

In 2005, due to Jiro's leading role in a TV drama"KO One", Shu met the CEO of "可米Comic Communication" through this connection. The CEO requested Shu to rearrange the TV drama's theme song into a rock version, and Shu completed this task within three days, leading to the band's first on-screen appearance.

On August 8, 2007, the band performed in "The X-Family".

Jiro played the male lead, while Shu portrayed the fifth male lead, playing the role of Hu Yan Jue Luo Xiu, leaving a deep impression on many viewers. DCW signed a contract with Comic Ritz, the brokerage company.

Meanwhile, DCW produced a lot of background music and songs for the TV series, including the well-known song "夠愛Gou Ai/All My Love for You", which featured guest singer Xie Hexian, who also appeared in the drama.

Jiro, who had joined the idol group "Fahrenheit", performed with DCW, but the company did not allow him to officially return to the band. In 2007, the original soundtrack (OST) for the drama "The X-Family" produced by DCW was released, featuring a collection of instrumental music tracks.

On February 27, 2009, the band performed in "K.O.3an Guo". Shu played the lead role in the drama, portraying Liu Bei/Hu Yan Jue Luo Xiu.

The drama achieved high ratings, featuring many songs and background music produced by DCW.

In 2010, DCW joined Warner Music and released their first mini-album.

DCW held concerts in Hong Kong and Shenzhen, marking their first time performing outside of Taiwan. These concerts were warmly welcomed by audiences.

In January 2011, DCW's first "D.C.W. Mini Album" won the 12th place in record sales and the first place in band sales for 2010.

On August 3, 2011, the band's official album "Wake Me Up" was officially released.

On October 12, 2011, the band's official album "D.C.W. Wake Me Up 'Passionate Rock Collector's Edition'" was re-released.

In February 2012, due to Shu and Deng needing to fulfill military service, DCW held a farewell concert, announcing a temporary leave from the music scene for one year.

However, during Shu's absence, the management company "可米Comic" decided to focus on developing the idol boy band "Spexial", and Warner also switched to signing with Spexial. From 2013 to 2014, DCW did not receive any musical work opportunities. The company hoped that Shu would continue acting, but refused to release new records for DCW for various reasons.

The Band disbanded in 2014 as announced by the leader Shu Chen. In September of the same year, guitarist Shu and vocalist Jie formed a new rock band called "赤世代|Chi Shi Dai|The Red Generation".

Due to leaving Warner, the style of the Red Generation has removed a lot of pop elements, focusing more on heavy rock. They have released several singles and their own albums, and have held tours in various regions.

In 2020, The Red Generation joined the Chinese band competition "The Big Band". Despite leading in the voting, their lead was repeatedly reduced by the actions of the organizers. Ultimately, Shu announced that he could not tolerate the unfair practices of the program team and withdrew from the competition.

Due to the COVID-19 pandemic in 2020, the Red Generation was unable to perform and announced the indefinite termination of their performances.

In 2020, Shu debuted as an independent musician using his real name "陳德修|Chen De Xiu|Shu Chen" and released songs.

Between 2016 and 2020, Shu and Jiro often performed together in duet performances, while the Red Generation held multiple concerts.

On December 31, 2023, Shu and Jiro performed "夠愛gouai|All My Love for You" at the New Year's Eve concert organized by Bilibili, which became a hot topic on the Chinese internet.

=== Band Members ===
Shu Chen](陳德修)-(July 15, 1982 - ), his stage name is 脩Shu, a singer and actor, the leader and main guitarist of the band "DCW", and formerly a founding member of the band.At the same time, he created most of the band's songs and is the core figure of the band.He has participated in the creation of drama theme songs, soundtracks, and related works many times.
Ming Lee (李明翰)-Stage name "Ming冥", who was a student at the same musical instrument store as Shu and had several collaborations with him. Later, he was brought into DCW by Shu to serve as the drummer. After the dissolution of DCW, Ming transitioned into being a music producer, creating soundtracks for TV dramas.
Free Dun (鄧樺敦)-Stage name "Deng镫".He was a high school classmate and bandmate of Shu and Jiro. Skilled in graphic design and drinking alcohol. Serving as the bass player and one of the founding members of the band. After DCW disbanded, he became a designer.
Vike Chen (陳志介)-Stage name "Jie戒", older brother of guitarist Shu. Apart from being in the band, he also runs a guitar teaching studio. A lover of animals. Originally a rhythm guitarist, he became the second lead singer after Jiro left the band.
Jiro Wang（汪東城）-Original lead singer, high school classmate of Shu. He withdrew from DCW band due to joining the boy band Fahrenheit, as the company did not allow him to be involved in two groups simultaneously.
Iyhon Chiu（邱議弘）-Stage name "Qiu萩", originally a rhythm guitarist, once appeared with DCW in a TV drama in 2005, left the band in 2006 to become a photographer. He still keeps in touch with the other members.

== Music ==
The band composed a song called "人間逃亡記" during the Karma era, lyrics by Jiro Wang.Music written by Shu.

OST: All my loves for you 《夠愛》 Released August 31, 2007
Track#	English Title	Chinese Title	Notes
1.	bian long tian	變龍天	composer Shu
2.	si ren kai guan	死人開棺	
3.	Iron imperial guard march	鐵克禁衛軍進行曲	Adapted from the Turkish March
4.	xia zhi han	夏之寒	
5.	Magic Trilogy: Soul Cleansing Melody, Soul Gathering Melody, Soul Soothing Melody	魔三部曲：洗魂曲，蒐魂曲，安魂曲	composer Shu
6.	The ultimate/tie ke wu ji	鐵克無極	composer Shu
7.	All my loves for you	夠愛	music written by Shu, lyrics written by Xie Hexian, singer Xiehexian.

1st mini album: D.C.W EP 《東城衛同名迷你專輯》 Released July 9, 2010(Warner Music Taiwan)
Track#	English Title	Chinese Title	Notes
1.	Broken	分裂	lyrics written by Shu&Deng, music write by Deng
2.	War to end all war	以戰止戰	lyrics and music written by Shu
3.	The day you left	在你離開那一天	lyrics and music written by Shu
4.	Far away	天使的距離	lyrics and music written by Shu
5.	Save me	浮世樂	lyrics written by Shu and music written by Shu&Ming
6.	All my loves for you	夠愛	music written by Shu, lyrics written by Xie Hexian, singer Jie

1st mini album: D.C.W EP power version CD+DVD 《東城衛同名迷你專輯護衛收藏版》 Released September 10, 2010(Warner Music Taiwan)
Track#	English Title	Chinese Title	Notes
1.	Broken	分裂	lyrics written by Shu&Deng, music write by Deng
2.	War to end all war	以戰止戰	lyrics and music written by Shu
3.	The day you left	在你離開那一天	lyrics and music written by Shu
4.	Far away	天使的距離	lyrics and music written by Shu
5.	Save me	浮世樂	lyrics written by Shu and music written by Shu&Ming
6.	All my loves for you	夠愛	music written by Shu, lyrics written by Xie Hexian.Singer Jie
7.	D.C.W in Live 40(DVD)	西門河岸爆棚紀實版	
8.	The day you left MV	在你離開那一天mv	lyrics and music written by Shu

1st official album: Wake me up Released August 3, 2011(Warner Music Taiwan)
Track#	English Title	Chinese Title	Notes
1.	Wake me up		lyrics and music written by Shu&Deng
2.	Dawn	黑暗曙光hei an shu guang	lyrics and music written by Shu
3.	Iliad	伊利亞特	lyrics and music written by Shu
4.	Back to the start	第一次擁抱	lyrics and music written by ShuLove Buffet's song
5.	Dream about you	想飛xiang fei	lyrics written by Shu and music written by MingLove Buffet's song
6.	the way out	出口chu kou	lyrics and music written by ShuLove Buffet's song
7.	Finale	最後的光景zui hou de guang jing	lyrics and music written by Shu'The M Riderss ending theme song
8.	High		lyrics and music written by Shu
9.	Dream on	無限夢想	lyrics and music written by Shu
10.	Scenes From a Memory	不走	lyrics and music written by Jie, Shu participated in the composition

== Other ==
In 2020, due to a cover of "All My Love for You" on TikTok, the song regained popularity. An internet celebrity named "Sheng Yu" covered the song and released it on a music platform without Shu's consent, setting it as a paid track and erroneously crediting himself as the songwriter and composer.

He also made controversial statements targeting DCW during a live broadcast.

Following Shu's strong protest, Sheng Yu took down the song.

In the same year, the lyricist of "All My Love for You", Xie Hexian, rearranged the song without the consent of Shu and other DCW members, releasing "All My Love for You 2.0" for profit online.

After being pointed out that he had not obtained authorization, Xie Hexian sent a license application to Shu, including a request for "permanent transfer of song copyright", which was rejected by Shu. Xie Hexian posted a large number of insulting comments about shu online, claiming to be the composer himself. This was rebutted by Comico Company, which confirmed that Shu was the composer of the song. Xie Hexian released a video demanding that Comico Company transfer the song to the public domain.

In 2021, Shu sued Xie Hexian in court, and the court ordered Xie Hexian to pay shu a total of 390,000 New Taiwan dollars, of which 40,000 was compensation for insulting Shu.

It should also be noted that Xie Hexian had previously been arrested for domestic violence and possession of drugs, and had been hospitalized multiple times for mental illness.

Before 2020, Xie Hexian was sued for compensation by his company "Asia Muse" due to multiple scandals. Lacking funds, Xie Hexian had already transferred the lyric copyright of "All My Love for You" to Asia Muse.
