= Fabulous Boys =

2013 Taiwanese television series

- From left to right. Hwang In Deok, Lyan Cheng, Jiro Wang and Evan Yo
- Also known as: Yuan Lai Shi Mei Nan; You're Beautiful
- 原來是美男
- Genre: Romance; Comedy
- Starring: Lyan Cheng; Jiro Wang; Hwang In Deok; Evan Yo
- Opening theme: Promise (約定) by Jiro Wang
- Ending theme: Be with Me (好不好) by Evan Yo
- Country of origin: Republic of China (Taiwan)
- Original language: Mandarin
- No. of episodes: 20

Production
- Producer: Jerry Yan
- Production locations: Taiwan, Japan
- Running time: Sundays at 22:00

Original release
- Network: FTV, GTV
- Release: 12 May – 4 August 2013

Related
- You're Beautiful; Ikemen desu ne

Fabulous Boys (Chinese: 原來是美男) is a 2013 Taiwanese drama starring Lyan Cheng, Jiro Wang, Hwang In Deok, and Evan Yo. It is a remake of the South Korean drama You're Beautiful, which first aired in 2009. It is also known as You're Beautiful Taiwan Version, You're Beautiful, He's Beautiful, as well as Yuan Lai Shi Mei Nan.

== Cast ==
=== Main cast ===
==== A.N.JELL ====
- Jiro Wang as Huang Tai Jing (黃泰京)
- Lyan Cheng as Gao Mei Nu 高美女 / Gao Mei Nan 高美男
- Pets Tseng as Gao Mei Nan 高美男 (Background Cover)
- Hwang In Deok as Jiang Xin Yu 姜新禹
- Evan Yo as Jeremy

=== Supporting cast ===
- Jenna Wang (王思平) as Liu Xin Ning 柳心凝
- Chen Wei Min as Mark 馬克
- Bao Wei Ming (包偉銘) as An Shi Jie 安士杰
- Lily Tien as Mu Hua Lan 慕華蘭
- Chang Hsin-yan (張心妍) as Ke Ti 可蒂
- Renzo Liu as Jin Da Pai 金大牌
- Nylon Chen as Gao Cai Yin
- Da Mu (大目) as Dancing instructor
- Amanda as Fan club president
- Xia Yu Xin (夏語心/寶咖咖) as Fan
- Riva Chang as Fan
- Gao Yu Shan (高玉珊) as Gao Mei Ci 高美慈
- Huang Yi Jia (黃一嘉) as Assistant Lin 林秘書
- Xia Yu Xin (夏語心) as Ding Ya Zi 丁亞姿
- Park Shin Hye as Go Mi-nam/Go Mi-nyeo [Korean Gao Mei Nu] (ep1)
- Luo Hong Zheng as himself (ep1)(SpeXial)
- Sam Lin as himself (ep1)(SpeXial)
- Xu Ming Jie as himself (ep1)(SpeXial)
- Huang Wei Jin as himself (ep1)(SpeXial)
- Tia Lee as herself (ep1)(Dream Girls)
- Puff Kuo as herself (ep1)(Dream Girls)
- Emily Song (宋米秦) as herself (ep1)(Dream Girls)

== Soundtrack ==
No.	Title	Singer	Length
1.	"約定"	Evan Yo, Jiro Wang, Pets Tseng	3:48
2.	"最安靜的話"	Evan Yo	4:12
3.	"相信嗎(Solo Version)"	Jiro Wang	4:24
4.	"黑暗中,我的星星在哭"	Evan Yo	4:27
5.	"半個人"	Jiro Wang	4:25
6.	"高美男Fighting"	Evan Yo, Jiro Wang, Pets Tseng	4:01
7.	"好不好"	Evan Yo	3:30
8.	"一生守候"	Jiro Wang	4:21
9.	"愛情怎麼喊停"	Pets Tseng	4:24
10.	"相信嗎"	Evan Yo, Jiro Wang, Pets Tseng	3:58

== Broadcast ==
Channel	Country	Debut date	Finale date	Broadcast date & time
Formosa Television	Taiwan	May 12, 2013	August 4, 2013	Sundays 10:00 pm
GTV	Taiwan	May 18, 2013	August 10, 2013	Saturdays 9:00 pm
Drama 1	Hong Kong	May 18, 2013	August 10, 2013	Saturdays 7:30 pm
MediaCorp Channel U	Singapore	May 18, 2013	August 10, 2013	Saturdays 9:00 pm
GMA Network	Philippines	October 28, 2013	November 29, 2013	Mondays to Fridays 5:00 pm – 5:45 pm
Channel 7	Thailand	February 15, 2017	March 28, 2017	Mondays to Thursdays 2:10 am
