= MJO (disambiguation) =

MJO is the Madden–Julian oscillation, the largest element of the intraseasonal variability in the tropical atmosphere.

MJO may also refer to:

- ISO 639:mjo, the ISO 639 code for the Malankuravan language
- Mount Etjo Airport, the IATA code MJO
- Metropolitan Jazz Octet, a group created by Chicago saxophonist and arranger Tom Hilliard

== See also ==
- M JO, a fashion label created by Taiwanese singer and actor Jiro Wang
