= Sam Lin =

Taiwanese singer (born 1993)

- 林子閎
- Born: Lin Tzu-hung; October 1, 1993 (age 32); Changhua County, Taiwan
- Other names: Sam; Zi Hong
- Education: Nan Chiang Vocation High School
- Occupations: Actor; singer; presenter
- Employer: TVBS (2020-present）
- Musical career
- Genres: C-pop; hip hop
- Instrument: Vocal
- Years active: 2012–present
- Label: Warner Music Taiwan

Chinese name
- Traditional Chinese: 林子閎
- Simplified Chinese: 林子闳
Transcriptions
Standard Mandarin
- Hanyu Pinyin: Lín Zǐhóng
- Wade–Giles: Lin Tzu-hung
Yue: Cantonese
- Jyutping: Lam Zi Hung
Southern Min
- Hokkien POJ: Lîm Chú-âng

Sam Lin (traditional Chinese: 林子閎; simplified Chinese: 林子闳, born October 1, 1993) is a Taiwanese actor and singer. He was a first generation member of the Taiwanese boy group SpeXial, from 2012 to 2020.

== Biography ==
Sam and his high school friend Brent were both discovered by talent agency Comic Communications, which were in the midst of producing a four-member boy band to succeed Fahrenheit. After successfully winning a series of auditions, both Sam and Brent were selected to be part of the first generation of SpeXial, alongside Wes Lo and Wayne Huang. Sam's position in the group was center and rapper.

SpeXial debuted on December 7, 2012 with the release of their self-titled debut album. Sam and Brent also starred as main characters in the Taiwanese drama KO One Return (2012), to promote the group's release. Sam went on to star in its sequel KO One Re-act (2013) and the spin-off K.O. 3AN-GUO (2017), alongside other SpeXial members.

On May 15, 2015, Sam temporarily left SpeXial to fulfill his compulsory military service. He was honorably discharged on May 14, 2016. He had his comeback stage on May 21, 2016 at the SpeXial Land 2016 concert.

From 2017 to 2019, Sam was a co-host on the entertainment variety show, Showbiz. The Taiwanese idol drama Five Missions (2018) was Sam's first drama as lead actor separate from his projects with SpeXial.

In 2019, he formed the music duo, the Dragon Tiger Brothers, with his SpeXial bandmate Brent Hsu.

In May 2020, Sam announced that he has joined a new management TVBS, officially marking his departure from SpeXial.

In 2021, he starred in the popular BL web drama series We Best Love.

== Filmography ==
=== Film ===
Year	Title	Chinese title	Role	Notes	Ref(s)
2015	Jack's Grandfather	傑克的爺爺	Lin Zi Hong		
2016	Kill Me	殺了我	Shitu Qian		
2017	A Tale of a Two-Timer	麥呆的劈腿日記	Mai Wei		
2017	Address Unknown	查無此人	Shitu Qian		
2017	Super Firm	異能事務所之嗜血判官	Shen Yixing		

=== Television series ===
Year	Title	Chinese title	Role	Network	Notes	Ref(s)
2012	KO One Return	終極一班2	Zhong Wan-jun	GTV	Supporting role	
2013	Fabulous Boys	原來是美男	Himself	FTV, GTV	Cameo (Episode 1)	
2013	KO One Re-act	終極一班3	Zhong Wan-jun	GTV	Supporting role	
2014	The X-Dormitory	終極X宿舍	Fighter	GTV	Cameo (Episode 40)	
2014	Angel 'N' Devil	終極惡女	Xiang Ming	GTV	Cameo (4 episodes)	
2015	Jack's Grandfather	傑克的爺爺	Lin Zi-hong		Television film Lead role	
2015	School Beauty's Personal Bodyguard	校花的貼身高手	Lin Yi (voice actor)	iQIYI	Season 1	
2015	Moon River	明若曉溪	Mu Liu-bing	GTV, Line TV	Lead role	
2017	A Tale of Two-Timer	麥呆的劈腿日記	Mai Wei		Television film Lead role	
2017	K.O. 3AN-GUO	終極三國	Guan Yu	GTV	Lead role	
2018	KO One Re-call	終極一班5	Wan Shuang-long	GTV	Cameo (8 episodes)	
2018	Between	三明治女孩的逆襲	Qu Zi-jun	SET	Supporting role	
2018	Five Missions	艾蜜麗的五件事	Dou Lei	TTV, EBC	Lead role	
2020	I, Myself	若是一個人	Yang Da-he	PTS, CTS	Supporting role	
2022	Golden Dream on Green Island	茁劇場－綠島金魂	Yang Zhi Jie	PTS	Lead role	

=== Web series ===
Year	Title	Chinese title	Role	Network	Notes	Ref(s)
2021	We Best Love: No. 1 for You	永遠的第一名	Gao Shi-de	WeTV	Lead role	
2021	We Best Love: Fighting Mr. 2nd	第二名的逆襲	Gao Shi-de	WeTV	Lead role	
2021	Rainless Love in a Godless Land	無神之地不下雨	Zhang Yu Xun	iQIYI	Cameo	
2023	W Series: Love Yourself	沒有你依然燦爛	Li Long Yi	LINE TV	Support Role	
2024	Unknown	關於未知的我們		YOUKU	Cameo	

=== Variety shows ===
Year(s)	Title	Chinese title	Role	Network	Notes	Ref(s)
2016	100% Entertainment	娛樂百分百	Himself	GTV	Guest presenter (6 episodes)	
2017–2019	Showbiz	完全娛樂	Himself	YouTube	Regular co-host	
2021	WBL Boys' Vacation	微波爐男孩的假期	Himself	WeTV	Regular member	
