= M JO =

Fashion label created by Taiwanese singer and actor Jiro Wang

- Industry: Fashion
- Founded: 14 February 2010; 15 years ago
- Founder: Jiro Wang

M JO is a Taiwanese fashion brand established by singer and actor Jiro Wang on 14 February 2010, in collaboration with Dong Cheng Wei members Shu and Deng. The label's slogan is "Enjoy Love, Life, and Peace." Wang graduated from Fu Shin Trade and Arts College (Taiwan) with a degree in Advertising Design. He is personally involved with designing the caps, clothing, and accessories, which are characterized by bold, vibrant, and colorful designs.

In 2014, M JO's creator and designer Jiro Wang designed an exhibit for World Trade Centre (Hong Kong), in line with the 2014 FIFA World Cup and to celebrate the label's upcoming 5th anniversary, where Wang's artwork, M JO products, and the label's iconic JO robot went on display from 30 May to 17 July 2014. Wang focused on elements of fantasy and science fiction and influenced the exhibit's conceptual design, which feature oversized gear wheels, planetary motions, and spaceships, amidst a cosmic backdrop. Street fashion was also a crucial thematic element.

M JO has collaborated with several fashion brands, including the U.S.-based New Era Cap Company, South Korean fashion label Dolly & Molly, Japanese fashion brand Shine. M JO has partnered with other Taiwanese celebrity fashion lines, including those belonging to Darren Chiu and Calvin Chen who is a member of Wang's boy band Fahrenheit.

In November 2014, Wang was invited to design a series of virtual stickers/large-sized emoji for Line (application), making him the first Taiwanese celebrity to design purchasable stickers for the application. He used the fashion line M JO's iconic JO robot as the theme to design the "M JO - JO Robot" series of 40 virtual stickers, which was released in Line's sticker store on 24 April 2015. The stickers were hand-drawn before transforming into computer graphics, they also incorporated popular contemporary Mandarin and Taiwanese dialect neologisms.
