= KO One Re-Member =

2016 Taiwanese television series

- Also known as: 終極一班4; Zhōng Jí Yī Bān 4
- Genre: School, Comedy, Fantasy, Action, Romance, Wuxia
- Directed by: Wu Jianxin (吳建新)
- Starring: Pets Tseng; Wes; Wayne; Zhiwei; Sylvia Wang
- Opening theme: "Boyz On Fire" by SpeXial
- Ending theme: "我不是你該愛的那個人" by Pets Tseng
- Country of origin: Republic of China (Taiwan)
- Original language: Mandarin
- No. of episodes: 60

Production
- Production location: Taipei, Taiwan
- Running time: 30 mins

Original release
- Network: Gala Television (GTV)
- Release: June 27 – September 16, 2016

Related
- KO One; The X-Family; K.O.3an Guo; KO One Return; KO One Re-act; The X-Dormitory; Angel 'N' Devil; K.O.3an Guo 2017; KO One Re-call

KO One Re-Member (traditional Chinese: 終極一班4; simplified Chinese: 终极一班4; pinyin: zhōng jí yī bān 4; literally: "The Ultimate Class 4") is a 2016 Taiwanese drama starring Pets Tseng, Wes, Wayne, Zhiwei and Sylvia Wang. It was produced by Comic International Productions (可米國際影視事業股份有限公司), Gala Television, and Youku Tudou, it started filming on December 10, 2015 and wrapped on May 8, 2016. it was first broadcast in Taiwan on cable channel Gala Television (GTV) Variety Show/CH 28 (八大綜合台) and IQiyi Taiwan on June 27, 2016 to September 16, 2016.

== Synopsis ==
Fourth installment of KO ONE: Continues the story where KO One Re-act left off:

Lei Ting suddenly went missing after she and Xiu were lured back from the Iron Dimension by a fake message and attacked upon arrival by unknown forces. So how did Lei Ting (King) disappear? The KO one class no longer has its leader, so Gu Zhan and Zhi Ge, despite their brotherhood, fight. Who is the leader of the KO one class? The KO one class initially suspected the three Students from Little Apple High School of the kidnapping and fought against them. Later, they found King through another lead. But she was no longer the same King they knew and she seems to have had amnesia. In the meantime, Duan Chang Ren also has gone missing. And Zhi Ge's father had a spy monitoring the class. A while later the three students from Xiao Ping Guo (Little Apple) High School – Zhi, Liu Chen, and Tai Yang transfers to Ba Le High School, the KO One class. Are they friends or enemy?

== Cast ==
=== Main characters ===
- Pets Tseng as Xiao Tzu (小慈), the alternate counterpart of Lei Ting from Silver Dimension who has been impersonating Lei Ting when the KO One class found her. Her real name is Sun Shang Xiang, the biological daughter of the Real Sun Jian who was murdered and impersonated by Ye Si Ti. She raised by her nanny who fled with Xiao Tzu to Gold Dimension to escape from Ye Si Ti's murdering attempt.
- Pets Tseng as Lei Ting (雷婷) (King), KO.3, King is the missing current leader of the "Zhong Ji Yi Ban" (Ko One Class) who was lured back to Gold Dimension by a fake message and attacked upon arrival by unknown forces. King went missing thereafter. She is the girlfriend of Wang Da Dong (汪大東).
- Luo Hong Zheng as Gu Zhan 辜戰 KO. 3, best friend of Zhi Ge, Later the boyfriend of Qiu Qiu. Has been Co-leading the KO-One Class with Zhi Ge Since King left Gold Dimension to aide Da Dong at the end of KO One Re-act.. He helped Qiu Qiu facing blood cancer. He slowly discover his unknown father's the identity was Du Gu Liang who was former best friend of Zhi Shui 止水 (father of Zhi Ge) and that he became evil to due being obsessing of becoming the most powerful fighter of Gold Dimension. Gu Zhan also later found that his father, Du Gu Liang was one behind the disappearance of King and Duan Chang Ren, and the villains that going against the KO One class.
- Wang Yi Wen as Qiu Qiu 裘球 KO.7, Qiu Qiu becomes closer with Gu Zhan and Zhi Ge. Late became the girlfriend of Gu Zhan. She facing blood cancer with support of Gu Zhan.
- Zhao Zhi Wei (趙志偉) as Zhi 執, one of the “Little Apple Trio.” along with Tai Yang and Liu Chen that transfer to Ba Le High School, the KO One class. A proud, stubborn and arrogant temperament. He has his own principles and high standards. He has severe OCD, and no matter where he goes he will use alcohol to clean the place three times. His arrogance creates his personal charm and makes Liu Chen and Tai Yang listen to everything he says, so he became the leader of the trio. For some reason his body temperature has to be within 27 degrees Celsius. Not only IQ is more than one hundred and eight, but also height! He later falls in love with Xiao Tzu.

"Zhong Ji Yi Ban" (Ko One) Class

- Huang Wei Jin as Zhi Ge 止戈KO.2, Best friend of Gu Zhan
- Xiao Hou as what's-his-name 那個誰 KO.8
- Zhang Hao Ming as Jin Bao San 金寶三, a 28-year-old high school repeat, prankster and comic relief, old classmate of Da Dong.
- Yang Zhen Zhen (楊震震) as Wo Bu Chou 我不瞅
- Lin Yu Fu (林宥富) as Zhen De Shuai 甄德率
- Liu Yi Xiang (劉逸翔) as Mao Bo Downey Jr. 小毛勃道尼
- Wang Ying Ting (王映婷) as Wai Ji 歪雞
- Chen Yan Ru (陳妍汝) as Cameron Bi Ya 卡麥隆鼻亞
- Zhan Meng Fan (詹孟凡) as Elizabeth Tai La 伊莉莎白泰辣
- Ba Yu as A Ji Shi 阿雞師

The Faculty

- Hsia Ching Ting as Jia Yong 賈勇, the current principal of Ba Le High School
- Ye Hui Zhi (葉蕙芝) as Gu Wen Jing 古文靜, Chinese teacher at Ba Le High School and wife of Jia Yong
- Jian Han Zong (簡漢宗/簡翰忠) as Su Bu Qi 蘇布啓, the drillmaster of Ba Le High School.

Wang Yi Ling (王轶玲) as Wang Ma Li 王瑪麗, school food store owner. Spy working for Zhi Shui.

Little Apple International High School

- He Hai Dong (何海东) as Liu Chen 流塵, a quiet guy who often catches onto small details that others miss. He is also very cautious and thoughtful about what he says, and when others are stuck with a problem during battle, he comes up with a good solution.
- Jiang Rui Ze (蒋蕊泽) as Tai Yang 太陽, she is very loyal, demanding respect for her friends, and stands up for them regardless of whether they want her to or not. However, she tends to be quite rash, and is easily provoked. She briefly had a rivalry and crush on Gu Zhan.

Pitaya High School

- Liu Jun Wei as Long Xuan Wu 瀧炫武
- Guo Xuan Qi (郭玄奇) as Zuo Hu Fa 左護法
- Lin Yu Xian (林育賢) as You Hu Fa 右護法

Others Characters

- Chen De Xiu as Xiu 脩, leader of interdimensional guards from the Iron Dimension and good friend of Da Dong. Got separated from King when sending her back to Gold Dimension when they got ambushed by unknown forces. Ally of the K0 One Class
- Na Wei Xun as Hei Long 黑龍, twin brother of Duan Chang Ren. He tries to uncover who responsible for kidnapping his older brother, Duan Chang Ren and find where is held captive at to save him. Return as Anti-hero/Anti-villain in this season.
- Na Wei Xun as Chang Ren 斷腸人, twin brother of Hei Long, He was kidnapped by unknown force who mistaken him for Hei Long, in the mental hospital where Hei Long previously stayed.
- Qin Yang (秦楊) as Zhi Shui 止水, an overprotective father of Zhi Ge and businessman. Revealed to be an old friend of Duan Chang Ren and Hei Long. He discovered that his former best friend, Gu Du Liang is alive and up to no good. He tries to stop Gu Du Liang with help of KO One class and Hei Long.
- Wang Yi Ling (王轶玲) as Wang Ma Li 王瑪麗
- Huang Zhong Kun (黃仲崑) as Gu Du Liang 孤獨狼, father of Gu Zhan and ex-boyfriend of Gu Jing. He became evil to due being obsessing of becoming the most powerful fighter of Gold Dimension. He was defeated by Zhi Shui, Hei Long, and their friends many years go. He was presumed decreased after his first defeat. He became evil to due being obsessing of becoming the most powerful fighter of Gold Dimension. Du Gu Liang was one behind the disappearance of King and Duan Chang Ren, and the villains that going against the KO One class. He has been secretly experimenting on kidnapped fighters to stabilized a way to absorb battle point from other fighters to make himself the most powerful fighter of Gold Dimension and rule the world. He was finally defeated by Gu Zhan, Ko-one class, Hei Long, and Zhi Shui after overloading himself with too much battle point he absorb from them and died from the fatal injuries. He is the main antagonist of this season.
- Wang Zhi Qiang (王自強) as Lao Sun 老孫
- Ding Ye Tian (丁也恬) as Grandma
- Lin Yi Xun (林奕勳/海狗) as Bass
- Win (SpeXial-風田) as Shen Mi 榊覔, family doctor of Liu Chen who is mute. He has crush on Tai Yang.
- Lu Yun Feng (呂鋆峰) as Xi Xi 奚溪, assistant and translator of Shen Mi
- Masuyama Yuki as Secretary Li 李秘書
- Ying Cai Ling (應采靈) as Gu Jing 辜靜, late mother of Gu Zhan. It was revealed that she left Gu Du Liang because she couldn't watch him go a dark path and becoming evil. She was a good friend and high schoolmate of Zhi Shui
- Xie Qi Wen as doctor
- Jiro Wang as Wang Da Dong 汪大東, The past leader of "Zhong Ji Yi Ban" (KO One). Self-confident and stubborn yet extremely loyal and charismatic. Boyfriend of King. He currently in Iron Dimension, aiding Xiu and others in Dimension War against Diablo and demon forces
- Huang Wan Bo as Dao Ba Jie Sen 刀疤傑森

== Music ==
No.	Title	Singer	Length
1.	"Boyz On Fire"	SpeXial	3:52
2.	"我不是你該愛的那個人"	Pets Tseng	4:44
3.	"我好寂寞"	A'N'D	3:22
4.	"Break it down 11.11"	SpeXial	3:13
