= Hanazakarino Kimitachihe =

Television program

- Promotional poster

Chinese name
- Traditional Chinese: 花樣少年少女
- Simplified Chinese: 花样少年少女
- Literal meaning: The tricks of boys and girls
Transcriptions
Standard Mandarin
- Hanyu Pinyin: Huāyàng Shàonián Shàonǚ
- Genre: Romance, comedy
- Based on: Hana-Kimi by Hisaya Nakajo
- Developed by: Gao Wu Song
- Screenplay by: Qi Xilin
- Directed by: Wang Mingtai
- Starring: Ella Chen; Wu Chun; Jiro Wang; Danson Tang
- Opening theme: "怎麼辦" ("What Should I Do?") by S.H.E
- Ending theme: "專屬天使" ("Personal Angel") by Tank
- Country of origin: Taiwan
- Original language: Chinese
- No. of episodes: 15

Production
- Production locations: National Chi Nan University, Puli, Nantou County
- Running time: 90 minutes (Sunday at 21:30)
- Production company: Comic Productions

Original release
- Network: Chinese Television System (CTS)
- Release: November 19, 2006 – March 4, 2007

Related
- Love Queen (戀愛女王); Summer x Summer (熱情仲夏); Hana-Kimi (2007); Hanazakari no Kimitachi e 2011; To the Beautiful You

Hanazakarino Kimitachihe (traditional Chinese: 花樣少年少女; simplified Chinese: 花样少年少女; pinyin: Huāyàng Shàonián Shàonǚ; lit. 'The tricks of boys and girls') is a 2006 Taiwanese drama starring Ella Chen of S.H.E, Wu Chun and Jiro Wang of Fahrenheit, and Danson Tang. It was based on Japanese shōjo manga series Hana-Kimi by Hisaya Nakajo.

The series was first broadcast in Taiwan on free-to-air Chinese Television System (CTS) (華視) from November 19, 2006, to March 4, 2007, every Sunday at 21:30 and cable TV Gala Television (GTV) Variety Show/CH 28 (八大綜合台) on November 25, 2006, every Saturday at 21:00.

Hanazakarino Kimitachihe was nominated for Best Marketing Programme of the Year at the 42nd Golden Bell Awards in 2007.

== Synopsis ==
Lu Ruixi (Ella Chen), a Taiwanese girl living in the United States, watches a documentary on Taiwanese high jumper Zuo Yiquan (Wu Chun). Inspired by his jumps, she transfers to Ying Kai University in Taiwan. However, it is an all-boys school and thus, Ruixi cuts her hair short and dresses up as a boy to attend it. She befriends Jin Xiuyi (Jiro Wang). When Ruixi gets knocked unconscious during a soccer match, Yiquan aids by taking her to the school's doctor, Meitian. Being gay, Meitian realizes that Ruixi is a girl. He keeps her identity a secret from everyone, including Ruixi. Unbeknownst to Ruixi, Yiquan had given up high jumping after a road accident while trying to save his high school classmate from being run over. Their relationship begins to blossom when Ruixi convinces Quan to return to high jumping.

== Cast ==
=== Main ===
- Ella Chen as Lu Ruixi/Mizuki Ashiya, the female protagonist who disugises as a man to attend Quan's school.
- Wu Chun as Zuo Yi Quan/Izumi Sano, the quiet male high jumper who defends those he cares about. Yiquan has given up high jumping at the beginning of the series, but was persuaded to return by Ruixi.
- Jiro Wang as Jin Xiuyi/Shuichi Nakatsu, a soccer star with doubts of his sexuality when Ruixi arrives.

=== Supporting ===
- Tang Zhiping as Meitian/Hokuto Umeda, the gay doctor who keeps Ruixi's secret. She often comes to him for advice and support.
- Danson Tang as Liang Si-nan/Minami Nanba, the flirtatuous leader of the No. 2 dormitory. He is Mei Yinghua's son and Meitian's nephew. Yangyang has a crush on him.
- Chen Wenxiang as Jiang Yeshen/Noe Shinji, a student who is often together with Guan Rihui and is frequently seen preening his hair.
- Xie Zhenghao as Guan Rihui/Kyōgo Sekine, Ruixi's classmate is often seen together with Jiang Yeshen.
- Hsie He-hsian as Dashu/Taiki Kayashima, Xiuyi's roommate who is an amateur spirit-chaser.
- Nissa Marion as Julia, Ruixi's best friend from the United States.
- Yujiro as Yu Chilang, Yiquan's dog whom he rescued from being taken away by the local animal control. Because the people who attempted to take him away were men, Yu Chi Lang has a particular dislike for male humans, except Quan.
- Ethan Juan as Shenle/Makoto Kagurazaka, Yiquan's rival who has superficial altercation with him.
- JJ Lin as Lu Jingxi/Shizuki Ashiya, Ruixi's older half-brother who is a Harvard graduate specializing in cardiology. He is possessive of his sister and was originally unaware that she had transferred into an all-boys school.
- Guo Chinchun as Mei Yinghua/Io Nanba, Meitian's sister and Liang Sinan's mother. She owns an inn where Ruixi, Yiquan, and Xiuyi stay and work at during first summer.
- Zhang Haoming as Wang Tiansi/Megumi Tennōji, leader of the No.1 dormitory
- Yang Haowei as Li Chengyang/Senri Nakao, a cynical and effeminate student who develops a huge crush on Liang Sinan.
- Vivienne Lee as Chi Junli/Komari Imaike, Xiuyi's ex-girlfriend who later admitted that he loved someone else.
- Futou as Ri Benqiao/Wataru Nihonbashi, a school photographer who tends to harass and stalk other students.
- Andy Gong as Oscar/Chen Jintu, leader of the No. 3 dormitory.
- Duncan Chow as Yuan Qiuye/Akiha Hara, a photographer and former classmate of Mei Tian at Ying Kai School who seems to have a crush on him.
- Alexia Gao as Wu Wanjuan/Kinuko Karasuma, a sports reporter who wrote most of the articles on Zuo Yiquan throughout his days as a high jump champion under the pen name of KK. She was Mei Tian's junior during their days at university and is unaware that he is gay; she believes they had a one-night stand.
- Joelle Lu as Abby/Ebi Kotobuki, Yuan Qiuye's assistant and ex-wife. She initially thought that Leixie was a girl.
- Chen Xiangling as Ke Yuxiang/Rika, Yiquan's high school friend who found herself in the middle of a road one day, prompting Quan to save her.
- Kao Chihung as Jiu Duan/Itsuki Kujō, one of Wang Tian Si's henchmen who is a Taekwondo master.
- Yuan Mingzhe as Bei Huake, one of Wang Tian Si's henchmen. His loyalty to Wang Tian Si leads him to take drastic measures against Ruixi.
- Zhang Yongzheng as Jiang Menzhen/Shōtarō Kadoma, a freshman who lives in the No.1 dormitory.
- Chen Wenxiang as Ah Shen/Shin Sano, Zuo Yiquan's younger brother.

== Reception ==
=== Viewership ===
The pilot episode of Hanazakarino Kimitachie started off strong, posting a rating of 3.05 The series encountered little competition until the premiere broadcast of Corner With Love starring Show Lo and Barbie Hsu. Before the latter's pilot episode aired, Hsu bet that its highest rating would hover around 2.9, while Chai Zhiping bet on ratings of around 3.3. Corner would end up posting a final average of 2.81, with a peak at around 3.25, but it did not match for Hanazakari no Kimitachie's average rating of 3.91 that week. The Corner With Love threat was held off for yet another episode, as Hanazakari no Kimitachie's eighth episode posted ratings of 3.88, compared to Corner With Love's 3.17 - a difference of nearly 150,000 viewers per minute.

As both series fought for viewership, Hanazakarino Kimitachie never rose its weekly ratings. By the 12th episode, the series was rated 5.0. The final episode achieved a rating of 5.98. The ratings for Hanazakari no Kimitachie were high that television channels in Japan and South Korea dished out over 30,000,000 NTD for the rights to broadcast the drama. The drama's ratings performance resulted in a nomination at the 2007 Seoul International Drama Awards in the Best Juvenile Drama category.

Gala Television had originally placed Hanazakari no Kimitachie in the Best Drama Series category, alongside Beijing dramas Tang Dynasty and The Great Revival, but changed their mind at the last minute. Following the drama's 15-episode run, media sources speculated that Chen, Wu, Wang all signed on to star in the sequel of Hanazakari no Kimitachie. In September 2007, Producer Huang Wangbo officially denied this claim.

No. of Episode	Original broadcast date	Nationwide	Average	Ranking	Peak
01	November 19, 2006	32.5%	2.39	1	
02	November 26, 2006	30.5%	3.05	1	3.54
03	December 3, 2006	34.6%	3.46	1	3.86
04	December 10, 2006	38.8%	3.88	1	4.35
05	December 17, 2006	36.8%	3.68	1	3.98
06	December 24, 2006	42.4%	4.24	1	4.71
07	December 31, 2006	31.1%	3.11	1	3.83
08	January 7, 2007	39.1%	3.91	1	4.30
09	January 14, 2007	38.8%	3.88	1	4.30
10	January 21, 2007	43.9%	4.39	1	4.48
11	January 28, 2007	42.9%	4.29	1	4.69
12	February 4, 2007	50.9%	5.09	1	7.15
13	February 11, 2007	48.3%	4.83	1	5.67
14	February 25, 2007	36.7%	3.67	1	4.13
15	March 4, 2007	36.3%	3.63	1	4.68
average		38.9%	3.83		

- Special episode: 5.98%
