= The Crossing Hero =

- Oromo poster
- 超級大英雄
- Genre: Fantasy, Romance, Action thriller
- Directed by: Zhou Xiao Peng(周晓鹏)
- Starring: Jiro Wang; Bruce Xie(謝孟偉); Hu Yang(胡洋); Nikki Hsieh; Lorene Ren
- Opening theme: "The Great Hero" (大英雄) by Jiro Wang
- Country of origin: Republic of China (Taiwan)
- Original language: Mandarin
- No. of episodes: (Online) 60 (CTV) 28

Production
- Producer: Jiro Wang(汪東城)
- Production location: Taiwan
- Running time: (Online) 23 March - 12 June 2015 (China Television (CTV - Taiwan)) 5 April 2015 - 12 July 2015 (CTi Variety (CTI - Taiwan)) 11 April 2015 – 18 July 2015
- Production companies: Hairun Media and Tencent Entertainment

Original release
- Release: Online 23 March 2015; CTV 5 April 2015; CTI 11 April 2015

The Crossing Hero (Chinese: 超級大英雄; pinyin: Chāo Jí Dà Yīng Xióng) is 2015 Taiwanese fantasy, magic realist, time travel idol-drama starring Jiro Wang, Bruce Xie, Hu Yang, Nikki Hsieh, Lorene Ren, Edison Wang, and Jeff Zhang, amongst others. The series also represents Taiwanese singer and actor Jiro Wang's production debut. An original web-based series jointly produced by Hairun Media and Tencent Video,

== Synopsis ==
The Crossing Hero is a time-traveling tale that follows the lives of Hong Xidong (Jiro Wang)--the leader of Ming dynasty Emperor Zhu Yunwen's personal bodyguard detail—and two imperial military guards, Peng Ze (Hu Yang) and Xu Xiaotian (Bruce Xie), who are hot in pursuit of a revolving pearl treasure in Hong's possession. All three time-travel into the 21st century, where Peng and Xu encounter Hong Xidong's identical future other, Hong Xiaodong (Jiro Wang). Peng and Xu's attempts to adjust to life in the future lead to a series of comedic adventures.

== Cast ==
- Jiro Wang (汪東城) as Hong Xiao Dong (洪曉東) / Hong Xi Dong (洪西東)
- Bruce Xie (謝孟偉) as Xiao Tian
- Hu Yang (胡洋) as Peng Ze
- Nikki Hsieh (謝欣穎) as Xian Ting
- Lorene Ren (任容萱) as Mo Han
- Edison Wang (王家梁) as Zhu Ke Shang
- Jimmy Hung (洪天祥) as David
- Jeff Chang (張皓明)
- Ivan Wang (王友良)
- Larisa Bakurova as Xu Fei

== Soundtrack ==
The C's theme song and MV, "The Great Hero" (《大英雄》), performed by Jiro Wang, has garnered more than 243,000 views on Tencent Video in less than a week, since its release on 15 March 2015.

== Broadcast ==
Beginning 23 March 2015, The Crossing Hero airs online, on Tencent Video, from Mondays through Fridays, at 12nn. Beginning 5 April 2015, The Crossing Hero airs on Taiwan's China Television (CTV), on Sundays, at 10 pm. Beginning 11 April 2015, The Crossing Hero airs on Taiwan's CTi Variety, on Saturdays, at 11 pm.

In Thailand first airs on PPTV, from Wednesdays to Fridays, at 14.55pm. Beginning 13 November 2015.

Country	Network(s)/Station(s)	Series premiere	Title
China	Tencent Video	March 23, 2015 - (Every Monday to Friday 12:00 (update 1 episode))	超級大英雄 ( ; lit: )
Taiwan	CTV	April 5, 2015 – July 12, 2015 (Every Sunday 22:00-24:00 (two episodes at a time))	超級大英雄 ( ; lit: )
Taiwan	CTi Variety	April 11, 2015 – July 18, 2015 (Every Saturday 23:00-01:00 (Broadcast two episodes at a time))	超級大英雄 ( ; lit: )
Japan	DATV	September 7, 2015 - ((Month) 19:00～(2 episodes in a row))	( ; lit: )
(Thailand) Siam	PPTVHD36	November 13, 2015 – January 28, 2016 (Every Wednesday to Friday 14:55-16:00)	จอมยุทธ์ทะลุมิติ The Crossing Hero ( ; lit: )

== Development ==
As a first-time producer, Jiro Wang spent millions in production costs perfecting the visual quality of The Crossing Hero. His perfectionist nature meant that production costs frequently overran throughout the filming process. "I even spent NT$2 million (approximately US$63,000) on one scene, which was spent to build props that would be demolished in a few months. It's distressing, but as a first time producer, I want to do my best," he said. The actor chose to forfeit his actor's paycheck in order to redirect the funds into production costs.

On 26 February 2015, a fifteen-second trailer was aired during producer and lead actor Jiro Wang's interview with Azio TV's program, City Color.

== Reception ==
The series has generated a buzz online prior to airtime: as of 18 March 2015, the topic #超级大英雄# (The Crossing Hero) has already been read 14.29 million times, with more than 39,000 people participating in the discussion on the popular Chinese micro-blogging site, Sina Weibo, with hopes of becoming one of the most popular dramas of the year. The series hit 2.72 million views on its premiere episode within the first two hours, topping the "Hot Topics" list on Sina Weibo at the time. Viewership hit 4.33 million by the end of the day on 23 March 2015. The series crossed a hundred thousand views on Tencent Entertainment following the airing of its 25th episode.
