= Angel 'N' Devil =

2014 Taiwanese television series

- Also known as: 終極惡女
- Genre: School, Comedy, Fantasy, Action, Romance, Wuxia
- Starring: Simon Lian; Sylvia Wang; Teddy Chen; Cosmos Lin; Lucia Chen; Ting; Allie; Sunnee; Wes Lo; Wayne Huang; Chen De Xiu
- Opening theme: "Angel and Devil" by A'N'D
- Ending theme: "不過失去了一點點" by Pets Tseng
- Country of origin: Republic of China (Taiwan)
- Original language: Mandarin
- No. of episodes: 26

Production
- Production location: Taipei, Taiwan
- Running time: 60 mins

Original release
- Network: Gala Television (GTV)
- Release: November 22, 2014 – February 15, 2015

Related
- KO One; The X-Family; K.O.3an Guo; KO One Return; KO One Re-act; The X-Dormitory; KO ONE: RE-MEMBER; K.O.3an Guo 2017; KO ONE: RE-CALL

Angel 'N' Devil (traditional Chinese: 終極惡女; simplified Chinese: 终极恶女; lit. 'The Ultimate Bad Girls') is a 2014 Taiwanese drama starring Simon, Teddy, Cosmos, Lucia, Ting, Allie, Sunnee, Wes, and Wayne. It was produced by Comic International Productions (可米國際影視事業股份有限公司) and Gala Television, it was wrapped on December 19, 2014. The 26-episode series was first broadcast in Taiwan on cable network Gala Television (GTV) Variety Show/CH 28 (八大綜合台) from November 22, 2014, to February 15, 2015.

== Synopsis ==
A group of high school girls is Copper Dimension's last defense against the dark forces. They signed a contract with Xiong Ya, a guardian of light, to protect the innocent with their lives in exchange for having one wish come true. When one of their own is killed in school, their hunt for the devils in human skin brings them face to face with their own inner demon. They soon discover they are not above the influence of evil.

== Cast ==
- Sylvia Wang as Yin Xiao Feng
- Simon Lian as Wang Charlie
- Teddy Chen as Xiong Ya
- Cosmos Lin as Kate
- Lucia Chen as Yan Yan
- Liu Yuting as Xiang Ning
- Allie Ji as Allie
- Sunnee Yang as Ding Dang

=== Others ===
- Cheng Yu Xi as Xiao Yang
- Luo Hong Zheng as Gou Zhui
- Wayne Huang as Wang Da Wei
- Chen De Xiu as Wei Yi
- Pets Tseng as Jie Ke
- Sam Lin as Xiang Ming
- Na Wei Xun as Ri Yin Wang
- Qin Yang as A Tian Wang
- Gong Ji An as Ji An
- Chen Wei Min as Wu Yong
- Daniel Chang as Hao Meng
- Xiao Hou as Yan Rui
- Huang Niu as Hu Po
- Zhang Zhe Hao as Wry neck assistant
- Wang Jian Min as killer
- Ba Yu as Zhang Mu Si
- Lin Yi Xun as Kai Da
- Cathy Shyu as He Jie
- Su Fei as Kate's mother
- Yan Zheng Lan as Lin Lin
- Yu Tai Yan as Yan Yan's mother
- Li Quan Zhong as Yan Yan's father
- Yang Zi Yi as Nightwalker
- Ying Wei-min as Daywalker
- He Ai Yun as Xiang Ning's mother
- Ariel Ann as Xiang Qing
- Jenny Wen as Xiao Mao
- Yin Shao De as Doctor Cheng
- Chien Te-men as Elderly pure daywalker
- Xu Hao Xiang as Nightwalker
- Chen Bor-jeng as You Wang
- Aoi Anna as Wang An Na
- Aoi Reina as Wang Rui Na
- Eunice Liu as Tu Mi

== Music ==
No.	Title	Singer	Length
1.	"Angel and Devil"	A'N'D	3:19
2.	"不過失去了一點點"	Pets Tseng	5:02
3.	"多年後"	Pets Tseng	4:25
4.	"我好寂寞"	A'N'D	3:22
5.	"不渴"	Pets Tseng	4:49
6.	"溫柔撞擊"	Pets Tseng	3:36
