= Sunnee =

Thai singer

- เกวลิน บุญศรัทธา 杨芸晴
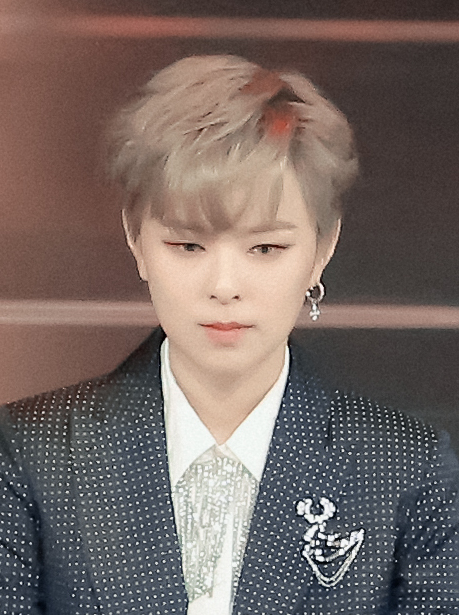
- Sunnee on January 11, 2020
- Born: Kewalin Boonsattha; September 28, 1996 (age 30); Samut Sakhon, Thailand
- Occupation: Singer
- Years active: 2011–present
- Musical career
- Also known as: เกวลิน บุญศรัทธา
- Genres: C-pop; Mandopop
- Labels: K-L Entertainment, Universal Music Taiwan; RYCE Entertainment
- Formerly of: A'N'D; Rocket Girls 101

Chinese name
- Traditional Chinese: 楊芸晴
- Simplified Chinese: 杨芸晴
Transcriptions
Standard Mandarin
- Hanyu Pinyin: Yáng Yúnqíng

Kewalin Boonsattha (Thai: เกวลิน บุญศรัทธา, romanized: Kewalin Boonsatta; born 28 September 1996), known professionally by her stage name Sunnee and her Chinese name Yang Yunqing, (Chinese: 杨芸晴, romanized: Yáng Yúnqíng) is a Thai singer of Chinese descent based in China. Born in Samut Sakhon, Thailand, debuted as a singer in Taiwan and gained popularity during a Chinese survival show Produce 101. She was a member of the Chinese girl group Rocket Girls 101 (disbanded on June 23, 2020) after ranking 8th in the Produce 101 finals. She was one of two Thai members in the group, the other being Li Ziting. Her first solo "Don't Cry" (不哭) was released on 19 September 2018.

On June 24, 2020, one day after the disbanding of Rocket Girls 101, Sunnee was being signed by the music company UMG China. UMG China provided a stage and assisted Sunnee to establish her first album "How's The Weather Today?" which was then published on September 28, 2020. By this album, she was nominated as the "Best New Artist" by the 5th CMIC Music Awards.

Sunnee's second album "秘ME" was published on September 24, 2021. Sunnee's third album "计划外惊喜" was published on year 2022.

== Early life and education ==
Sunnee was born in Samut Sakhon, Thailand. At the age of 15, she went to Taiwan to pursue her dream of becoming a singer. She studied in Juang Jing Vocational High School in Taipei. During her stay, she was chosen by Comic Communication Co. to become an artist under them. After graduating high school, she attended Jinwen University of Science and Technology and majored in tourism.

== Career ==
=== 2011–2012: Pre-debut ===
In September 2011, Sunnee joined the 5th Global Hokkien Singing Competition Thailand Division held in Bangkok and won 1st runner-up. Afterwards, she represented Thailand in the 5th Global Hokkien Singing Competition to compete with representatives from all around the world for one month in Fujian and finished 4th runner-up.

=== 2014–2017: First on-screen debut and debut with A'N'D ===
In 2014, Sunnee acted in the television series "GTO Taiwan" and "The X-Domitory", both having only cameo appearances. On November 19, 2014, she debuted with her company's girl group, "A'N'D", also known as "Angel N Devil". Their first single, titled "Angel and Devil," was the opening theme song for "Angel 'N' Devil," where Sunnee played in the lead as Ding Dang. In the same year, the group released a single named "I'm so Lonely."

In 2015, her second lead role came soon after, playing as Feng Xiaoxiao in "School Beauty's Personal Bodyguard".

Sunnee participated in iQiyi's The Birth of a Star from 2016 to early 2017 and finished at 6th place.

=== 2018 – 2020: Produce 101 and Rocket Girls 101 ===
In January 2018, Sunnee played in "KO ONE: RE-CALL" as Lan Sichun, sister of Lan Siluo.

In April, Sunnee, together with other trainees from her company, participated in the Chinese reality survival girl group show Produce 101 aired on Tencent Video. Sunnee was placed 8th overall and debuted with Rocket Girls 101 on June 23, 2018.

On August 18, 2018, Sunnee, together with her group Rocket Girls 101, released their first EP titled Collide(撞) with a total of four songs. Sunnee was the member with most album sales count based on the solo supporting passage in the digital sales of the album with a total sales amount of more than 6 million Chinese Yuan. With this, Sunnee was given the chance to release a single as a reward.

On September 20, 2018, Sunnee released her first single "Don't Cry (不哭)" as a promotional song for the movie "Cry Me a Sad River(悲伤逆流成河)." On October 26, Sunnee, together with four other members of Rocket Girls 101, released a promotional song for Venom in China titled "Venom Arrives(毒液前来)." On December 20, her rewarded single titled "Sunny" was released.

From January to March 2019, Sunnee, together with Rocket Girls 101, held their first tour concert with stops at Shanghai, Beijing, and Guangzhou.

On June 22, 2019, Sunnee released an official cover of the song "Forget the Hug(忘记拥抱)" in NetEase Music as a part of their "Reset Youth Plan" Project.

In July 2019, Sunnee released her single "That me(那个我)" as a part of Rocket Girls 101's new album "The Wind(立风)." She was also once again the member with most album sales with a total sales again more than 6 million Chinese Yuan. This time, she will be rewarded with a personal EP containing two songs to be released by December 2019.

On July 29, 2019, Sunnee was nominated for the award "All Media Recommended New Artist of the Year(全媒体推荐年度新人)" in the Global Chinese Music Leaderboard(全球华人歌曲排行榜) with the awarding to be held in Macao on August 30, 2019.

From October 15 to October 17, Sunnee was jointly invited by London Q Awards and China's Q Magazine, representing one of China's Young Talented Musicians to attend The Q Awards 2019 at Roundhouse, London.

On December 23, 2019, Sunnee's new EP "Qing Ge (擎歌)" was released, including 2 songs, "擎歌" and "Look at Yourself". Sunnee wrote the Chinese lyrics of "Look at Yourself".

On December 27, 2019, the music video of the song "Qing Ge (擎歌)" was released, followed by the dance video of "Look at Yourself " on December 29.

=== 2020–present ===
On June 23, 2020, Rocket Girls 101 disbanded.

On June 24, 2020, Sunnee sign in Universal Music China (UMC).

On June 26, 2020, Sunnee released the first single "By Your Side(陽光的陪伴)", the first single after she signed a new contract with Universal Music China (UMC). This song is made by the team of producer 220 (Joseph Park), who are the behind-the-scenes producer for Twice, GOT7, NCT and other popular K-Pop artists.

On August 7, 2020, Sunnee released the second single "Summer Party(夏日Party)". This song is made by Josh Fountain who produced the song "Supalonely".

On August 24, 2020, "Summer Party(夏日Party)" dance practice music video released.

On September 4, 2020, Sunnee released her first duet song "Like a child(像孩子一樣長大)", which was a collaboration song with Huang Zitao.

On September 10, 2020, "Summer Party(夏日Party)" MV trailer released.

On September 11, 2020, "Summer Party(夏日Party)" MV released.

On September 19, 2020, the first album "How's the weather today?(天氣：晴)" pre-sale began. The pre-sales exceeded 2,500,000 songs (over 5,000,000 RMB) and it was certified by "Diamond Records" in QQ Music. Sunnee has become the fastest female singer of QQ Music to break the certification of "triple gold", "platinum", "double platinum", "triple platinum", and "diamond records" in 2020!

On September 21, 2020, the first album "How's the weather today?" Highlight medley released.

On September 28, 2020, the first album "How's the weather today?(天氣：晴)" release, the album press conference cum birthday party take place in Canton Tower.

On October 6, 2020, the first album "How's the weather today?(天氣：晴)" sales exceeded 5,000,000 songs (over 10,000,000 RMB) and it was certified by "Double Diamond Records" in QQ Music. Sunnee has become the fastest female singer of QQ Music to break the certification of "triple gold", "platinum", "double platinum", "triple platinum", "diamond records" and "double diamond records" in 2020.

On September 17, 2021, the second album"秘ME"(secret me) poster released and announce that the album will release on September 24, 2021 10:00 (GMT+8).

On September 24, 2021, the second album"秘ME" (secret me) is officially released.

On December 23, 2022, the third album "计划外惊喜" (unplanned surprise) is officially released.

== Discography ==
=== Albums ===
No.	Album title	Release date	Label	Track listing
1	How's the Weather Today? (天氣：晴)	2020-09-28	Universal Music China (UMC)	Track listing: 1. "Summer Party" (夏日Party); 2. "By Your Side" (陽光的陪伴); 3. "Like a Child" (像孩子一樣長大); 4. "Rain" (雨); 5. "Sunset Never Sleeps" (不落的音符); 6. "A Fine Day" (多雲轉晴); 7. "Taking My Time" (慢); 8. "Heartbeat" (心跳); 9. "Feels like Magic"; 10. "Light" (下一天)
2	秘ME	2021-09-24	UMC	Track listing: 1. "Want To" (癮); 2. "All Alone" (你不適合兩個人); 3. "Oops! (I’m Comin' Thru)"; 4. "Gimme Gimme"; 5. "Recognition" (因為懂得); 6. "Miss You" (我沒有想你); 7. "You're on My Mind" (在未來等一個你); 8. "Can't Go Back" (想念你的美); 9. "On and On"; 10. "Want To" (acoustic)
3	计划外惊喜	2022-12-23	UMC	Track listing: 1. "Bad for me" 2. "Fine" (也好); 3. "Unplanned Surprise" (计划外惊喜); 4. "Unsuitable" (不宜); 5. "Monsoon Season" (梅雨季); 6. "Wave" (浪); 7. "Stolen" (窃); 8. "Summer Night"; 9. "The Planet I Wander With You" (与你漫步的星球); 10. "I Won't" (我偏不)

=== Singles ===
Title	Year	Peak chart positions	Sales	Album
Title	Year	CHN	Sales	Album
"Don't Cry" (不哭)	2018		—N/a	Promotional song for movie "Cry Me a Sad River" (悲伤逆流成河)
"Sunny"	2018	62	567,759	Non-album single
"Forget That Hug" (忘记拥抱)	2019	54	—N/a	Non-album single
"Me" (那个我)	2019		—N/a	RocketGirls101（火箭少女101）《立风》
"Qing Ge" (擎歌)	2019		—N/a	
"Look At Yourself"	2019		—N/a	
"Things I Do for Love"	2020		—N/a	"Love Is Sweet" (半是蜜糖半是伤) OST
"Belong to you"	2020		—N/a	"Professional Single" (我凭本事单身) OST
"Brave The Wind And The Waves" (乘风破浪)	2021		—N/a	Promotional song for movie "The Conductor" (指挥家)
"My Look" (我的样子)	2021		—N/a	《亲爱的我》
"0.1% World" (好想去你的世界爱你)	2021		—N/a	Promotional song for movie "0.1% World" (好想去你的世界爱你)
"Somewhere In Time" (今夕是何年)	2022		—N/a	"A Dream of Splendor" (梦华录) OST
"Take Me Back"	2022		—N/a	"The Heart of Genius" (天才基本法) OST
"Glass" (玻璃)	2022		—N/a	"The Investigator" (简言的夏冬) OST
"Scorching Moonlight" (滚烫的月光)	2022		—N/a	"Shinng Just For You" (星河长明) OST
"Missing You" (念你)	2023		—N/a	"The Legend of Anle" (安乐传) OST

==== Collaborations ====
Title	Year	Album
"ต๊ะต่อนยอน...Hurry Up!" (VYRA feat. Sunnee)	2021	Non-album single

== Filmography ==
=== Television series ===
Year	English title	Chinese title	Role	Description	Ref
2014	GTO Taiwan	麻辣教师GTO 台湾篇	Student	Cameo	
2014	The X-Dormitory	终极X宿舍	Dancing Girl	Cameo	
2014	Angel 'N' Devil	终极恶女	Ding Dang(叮当)	Lead Role	
2015	School Beauty's Personal Bodyguard	校花的贴身高手	Feng Xiaoxiao(冯笑笑)	Lead Role	
2018	KO ONE: RE-CALL	终极一班5	Lan Sichun(蓝斯春)	Lead Role	
2018	Hottie Has Demonic Temperament	小哥哥有妖气	Sunnee	Cameo	

=== Variety shows ===
Year	Title	Network	Description
2011–2012	Global Hokkien Singing Competition 第五届全球闽南语歌曲创作演唱大赛	SETV	Pre-debut; Finished 5th
2017	The Birth of a Star 明星的诞生	iQiyi	Contestant; Finished 6th
2018	Produce 101	Tencent Video	Contestant; Finished 8th
2019	Super Penguin League; Season:2 超级企鹅联盟Super3	Tencent Video	Basketball Team Manager
2019	Mask Singer Season 4 蒙面唱将猜猜猜第四季	Jiangsu Channel/Youku 江苏卫视/优酷	Singer; Episode 10: Performed "同类" and "想幸福的人"
2020	Top Glory Moment; TOP榮耀時刻	CCTV-3 中央电视台综艺频道	Singer; Episode 10: Performed "没那麼簡單" and "陽光的陪伴"
2020	Hello Life Season 2 你好生活第二季	CCTV-3 中央电视台综艺频道	Singer; Episode 2&3: Performed "陽光的陪伴" and "卡路里"
2020	Super Hit 宇宙打歌中心	Youku 优酷	Singer; Episode 02: Performed "雨"
2020	Mars Intelligence Agency Season 5 火星情報局第五季	Youku 优酷	Senior Agent; Showing from Episode 05 and promoted to Season 6
2021	Shine! Super Brothers 追光吧！哥哥	Youku 东方卫视 灿星制作	Episode 12: Performed part of "I'm Not Cool"
2021	The Treasured Voice 2 天赐的声音2	浙江卫视/腾讯视频/优酷/爱奇艺/中国蓝TV	Episode 08: Performed "谁不是“ and "说得倒做得到“

== Magazines and published works ==
Published Date	Publisher	Title	Description
15 November 2014	Shuiling Wenchuang	Angel 'N' Devil Character	–
23 December 2014	Shuiling Wenchuang	Angel 'N' Devil Photobook	–
26 January 2015	Shuiling Wenchuang	Angel 'N' Devil Battle of Copper Times Diary	–
8 January 2016	Shuiling Wenchuang	Angel 'N' Devil Time and Space	–
2018 13th Month Issue	Trends Group	Trends·COSMOPOLITAN 时尚COSMO	Beauty Bible; Inner pages
2019 August Issue	Trends Group	Super Magazine; SUPER艺术时尚杂志	Cover and inner pages
2019 November Issue	Trends Group	Trends·COSMOPOLITAN E-Magazine 时尚COSMO電子刊	Cover and inner pages
2020 August 2337 Issue	Life Style Media Group	Trends·Lifestyle Magazine 精品购物指南	Cover and inner pages

== Awards ==
Year	Award	Awarding Authority	Result	Ref
2018	Artist Influence Leaderboard Top 10 New Artists of the Year	Sina Weibo	Top 10	
2018	2018 Popular New Artist	QQ Music 2018 Peak Leaderboard Popularity White Paper	Won	
2019	Most Popular New Influence 2019	Popular Golden Tune Leaderboard TOP	Won	
2019	Weibo Star Shine Goddess	Weibo Star Shine Festival	Won	
2019	All Media Recommended New Artist of the Year	Global Chinese Music Leaderboard	–	
