= Jiro Wang =

Taiwanese singer and actor

- 汪東成
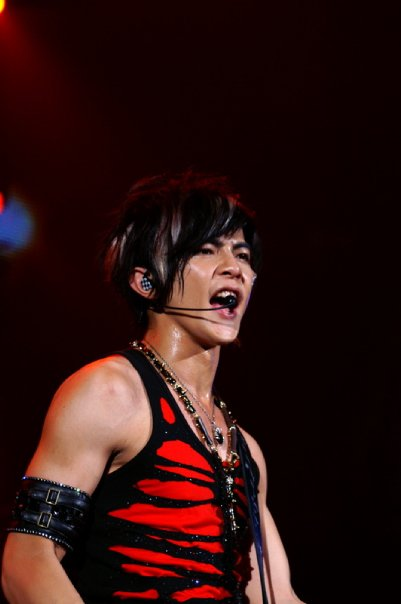
- Wang at Fahrenheit concert in 2009
- Born: 汪東成; Wang Tung Ch'eng; August 24, 1981 (age 45); Taipei, Taiwan
- Citizenship: Republic of China (Taiwan)
- Education: Fu-Hsin Trade & Arts School
- Occupations: Actor; singer; model
- Years active: 2001–present (modeling); 2004–present (acting); 2005–present (singing)
- Musical career
- Also known as: Wang Da Dong
- Origin: (Taiwan)
- Genre: Mandopop
- Instruments: Vocals; guitar
- Labels: HIM International Music; WOW Music; Pony Canyon; Warner Music Taiwan
- Formerly of: Fahrenheit; Dong Cheng Wei

Chinese name
- Traditional Chinese: 汪東城
- Simplified Chinese: 汪东城
Transcriptions
Standard Mandarin
- Hanyu Pinyin: Wāng Dōngchéng
Hakka
- Pha̍k-fa-sṳ: Vông Tûng-sàng
Yue: Cantonese
- Jyutping: Wong1 Dung1-sing4
Southern Min
- Hokkien POJ: Ong Tong-sêng
- Website: Fahrenheit@HIM International Music

Jiro Wang (Chinese: 汪東城; born August 24, 1981) is a Taiwanese singer and actor, who started his career as a model. Wang is a member of Taiwanese Mandopop vocal quartet boy band Fahrenheit.

== Life ==
Jiro Wang was born August 24, 1981, in Taiwan. He graduated from Fu Shin Trade and Arts College with a degree in Advertising Design. Wang's father died when he was 18, leaving him and his mother stranded with the family debt. To pay off the enormous debt, Wang worked three jobs at a time, which variously included flyer distribution, dressing up as a mascot for Taipei's Zoo Mall, waiting tables at a bar, a fashion retail assistant, a part-time model, and even hard labor work as a construction worker. Upon graduation from arts college, he entered the commercial and modeling industry. BMG, the label that signed him, planned to package him with Jay Chou and Jordan Chan under the "3J Plan", but when BMG's stocks crashed following 9/11, the 3J plan was scrapped. Wang then decided to continue his career in the industry via commercial modeling and working backstage in fashion design. He was approached again around 2004, launching the start of his acting career.

He speaks fluent Taiwanese and Mandarin, and understands conversational English.

Wang used to play with an underground band named Karma and was their lead singer. Wang also composed the lyrics to their song, "人間逃亡記" (Rénjiān táowáng jì). The band later changed its name to Dong Cheng Wei (東城衛).

In 2013, between his filming commitments, Wang also held solo concerts in the cities of Osaka, Kyoto, and Tokyo in Japan, and Beijing and Shenzhen in China.

Apart from sharing work and lifestyle photographs, Wang uses his Weibo account to advocate various charitable causes, especially those relating to aiding aged war veterans (like Wang's own father) and elderly street hawkers, and animal welfare, amongst others. His early difficult financial circumstances made him a firm believer in helping those in need and the privilege of being able to give. Though he has used his celebrity status to aid charitable organizations such as Taiwan's Syinlu Social Welfare Foundation to raise funds and awareness for those with intellectual disabilities—such as shooting the micro-film entitled Seeing and designing packaging for the sale of their handicrafts—he remains largely low-profile about his personal charitable contributions. Some of his acts of goodwill only come to light when organizations publish a list of their donors, for instance.

On February 14, 2010, Wang started his own fashion label M JO <http://mjo.com.tw/index.html>. In line with its founding date on Valentine's Day, the label's slogan advocates, "Enjoy Love, Life, and Peace." As a design graduate with a passion for art, Wang personally designs the caps, clothing, and accessories, which are characterized by bold, vibrant and colorful designs. Wang, who is well known in the industry for his filial piety, credits his mother for his artistic gifts and love of design. She was a tailor / custom dressmaker and Wang learnt part of his craft from watching her work when he was young. He was partly motivated to create the fashion label as a gift to his mother. In 2014, Wang designed an exhibit for World Trade Centre (Hong Kong), in line with the 2014 FIFA World Cup, where Wang's artwork, M JO products, and his label's iconic JO robot were on display from 30 May – July 17, 2014. In 2014, Wang was invited to design the "M JO – JO Robot" series of virtual stickers/large-sized emoji for Line (application), making him the first Taiwanese celebrity to design purchasable stickers for the company. Using his fashion line M JO's iconic JO robot as his theme, he designed a series of 40 virtual stickers, which was released in LINE's sticker store on April 24, 2015.

Wang jointly invests in WoMen Hair, a stylish hair salon in Taipei, with his good friends and fellow Fahrenheit mates, Calvin Chen and Wu Chun. On May 6, 2014, they attended the opening ceremony of WoMen Hair, which is run by their longtime friend and colleague, Sam Chen.

Wang's interest in art and Japanese manga includes a NT$10 million (approx. US$315,000) investment in exclusive agent rights for Chibi Maruko-chan merchandise in Taiwan. His love of the series began as a child, when he would hurry home after school to catch the television series over his meal-time. Through his friend Ivan Wang's introduction, Jiro Wang flew to Japan at the end of 2013 to meet with the manga artist, Momoko Sakura, creator of the series Chibi Maruko-chan. Momoko Sakura was impressed with Jiro Wang's gift of his personal artwork, which led to a collaboration featured in Chibi Maruko-chan's 30th anniversary publication entitled 《恭喜》, published both in Japanese and traditional Chinese. Jiro Wang and Momoko Sakura's collaboration is featured as part of the series' larger 30th anniversary exhibit, which was variously on display in Japan (August 6–20, 2014; December 27, 2014 – January 12, 2015) and Hong Kong (November 3, 2014 – January 4, 2015). In 2014, Jiro Wang and Ivan Wang established Toyu / 東友企業 (a synthesis of their Chinese names) and became exclusive agents for marketing Chibi Maruko-chan products in Taiwan. They have plans to make a Chibi Maruko-chan movie and Jiro Wang may possibly play Maruko's father or her classmate Kazuhiko Hanawa, depending on Maruko's age in the movie.

In his spare time, Wang takes an interest in putting Gundam models together and also in cosplay—a pastime he has enjoyed since his art school days, when he used to make his own costumes—and frequently shares photos on his Instagram and/or Weibo account in various roles as manga or anime characters, or Western superheroes, including Iron Man, Wolverine, Batman, and Captain America.

== Career ==
=== Acting career ===
Wang is most well known as the male lead in the Taiwanese drama KO One (終極一班) (in which he plays the character Wang Da Dong, where he got his nickname, as it is quite similar to his real name, Wang Dong Cheng) and its sequel The X-Family. He is also known for roles such as Ah Jin in It Started with a Kiss, as Jin Xiu Yi in the live-action Taiwanese drama, Hana-Kimi (花樣少年少女), and Huang Tai Jing in the Taiwanese adaptation of Fabulous Boys (原來是是美男).

On May 3, 2011, it was announced that Wang has replaced Wu Chun as male lead, "Night Tenjo", in a live-action adaptation of Japanese manga series Absolute Boyfriend, with Korean actress Ku Hye-sun as "Riiko Izawa".

When Transformers: Age of Extinction launched an online Chinese casting contest for roles in four different categories in China during the summer of 2013, Wang emerged as the most popular contestant in the "Action Guy" category, from amongst 70,000 entrants. More than 500,000 people voted online for their favorite contenders, with Wang consistently in the lead for the "Action Guy" category, with more than 133,000 votes. Despite his popularity, Wang regretfully chose to eventually withdraw from the contest due to a conflict in KO One Re-act's filming schedule and Transformers 4's training schedule, choosing to honor his prior filming commitments in order not to hold up KO One Re-act's production team—which was still filming scenes and had already gone on-air in Taiwan and online in Mainland China. In his statement of withdrawal, published on the casting contest's website, Wang explained: "I'm immensely grateful for all the support I've received during the Transformers 4 casting contest and am truly fortunate to have emerged first in the "Action Guy" category. I've been a Transformers fan since I was little, and closely followed the first three installments of the movie. Upon learning that M1905 Movie Web was organizing a casting contest for Chinese actors, I signed up immediately, hoping to fulfill my childhood dream of going into battle alongside Bumblebee (Transformers). I was pleasantly surprised by the overwhelming wave of support and votes I received, and was overjoyed to receive notification from the organizers to begin the second round of training. Unfortunately, because I'm still in the midst of an ongoing, prior filming commitment, I have to honor those unfinished work commitments in order not to hold up the entire production team, and will thus have to regretfully give this training opportunity up." During a media interview at a promotional event for the KO One Re-act television series, Wang reiterated his thanks for fans' warm support. Though his disappointment at the missed opportunity was palpable, he called the voting process a fantastic memory to have and to hold with his fans.

In 2014, Wang also became producer of the drama series The Crossing Hero (超級大英雄), in addition to his role as male lead. The series generated a buzz online prior to airtime: as of March 18, 2015, the topic #超级大英雄# (The Crossing Hero) was read more than 14 million times, with more than 39,000 people participating in the discussion on the popular Chinese micro-blogging site, Sina Weibo. The series hit 2.72 million views on its premiere episode within the first two hours, topping the "Hot Topics" list on Sina Weibo at the time. Viewership hit 4.33 million by the end of the first day on March 23, 2015.

In 2016, Wang starred as the leading character Cao Yan Bing in the popular manhua adaption live action series Rakshasa Street. With its airing on Youku (one of the most influential video website in China) on August 2, 2017, Rakshasa Street's viewership has reached 2.9 billion by November 22, 2017. The producer and Wang himself has also confirmed that season 2 is to be expected.

=== Music career ===
Wang was the first member to join Fahrenheit. He is the baritenor vocalist of the group. He is the one that usually has the rap part in most of the songs due to his fluency in the language. His publicized temperature is that of hot (热; rè) summer, at 95 Fahrenheit.

Wang released his first solo album What Are You Waiting For (Chinese:你在等什麼) on his 31st birthday, August 24, 2012.

== Discography ==
1st solo album: What Are You Waiting For 《你在等什麼》 Released August 24, 2012 (HIM International Music)
Track#	English Title	Chinese Title	Notes
1.	Feel Me		lyrics and music written by Jiro Wang
2.	What Are You Waiting For	你在等什麼	
3.	I Should Love You	我應該去愛你	Drama Go! Go! Go!'s ending theme song
4.	Dare to Love Me	敢不敢愛我	collaboration with Power Station (Taiwanese band)
5.	Your Screenplay	我們的劇本	Drama Go! Go! Go!'s main theme song
6.	No Angels Found	這裡沒有天使	
7.	Like You	像你	in memory of Jiro Wang's father
8.	Make-Believe (a.k.a. Pretend We Never Loved)	假裝我們沒愛過	Absolute Darling's ending theme song also part of the Absolute Darling OST
9.	Perfect Heart Beat	完美心跳	Absolute Darling theme song also part of the Absolute Darling OST
10.	For Me	替我	The Purple House's ending theme song

Fabulous Boys OST (《原來是美男》原聲帶) Released May 31, 2013 (Warner Music Taiwan and Da Fang Entertainment)
Track#	English Title	Chinese Title	Notes
1.	Promise	約定	collaboration with Pets Tseng and Evan Yo; Fabulous Boys main theme song
3.	Believe (solo)	相信嗎	
5.	Half of Me	半個人	
8.	A Lifetime of Waiting	一生守候	
10.	Believe (A.N.Jell)	相信嗎	collaboration with Pets Tseng and Evan Yo

Singles Villa OST (《只因單身在一起》原聲帶) Released February 4, 2015 (Hunan Television, Mango Media, Mango Entertainment, and Aura Media)
Track#	English Title	Chinese Title	Notes
2.	The Gentlest Strength	最溫柔的力量	MV released December 23, 2014

Wang's new MV, "Exclusive Fort" (《專屬堡壘》)--theme song to the movie, Bloody Doll—was released on February 9, 2015.

Wang sings the opening theme song for his new drama series, The CrBloomsomero. ThBloomsoms entitled "The Great Hero" (《大英雄》) and an MV was released on March 15, 2015, one week before the online series goes on air on Tencent Video.

=== Other Solos ===
Releasing Date	English Title	Chinese Title	Notes
August 31, 2007	Across the Water	在水一方	The X-Family OST (《終極一家》電視原聲帶)
2015	Compromise	妥協	Ending song of series Advance towards the Happiness 《朝著幸福前進》
2015	The World Never Ends	世界不會毁滅	Ending song of series Looking for Aurora 《尋找北極光》
January 11, 2017	Blossom under The Tree	花開樹下	Web series Taohua Yuan 《學院傳說之三生三世桃花源》 Promotion Song
February 22, 2017	Together with You, Let's Go	與你Let's Go	Ending song of Taiwanese adaption live-action series Maruko TV Drama
April 11, 2017	The Sad Pacific	傷心太平洋	Movie A Nail Clipper Romance 《指甲刀人魔》Promotion Song, an adaption of Richie Jen's song of the same title
April 28, 2017	Heroes Also Shed Tears	英雄也會流淚	Mobile Game Monkey King Hero is Back Theme Song
September 17, 2020	Go For Love Faraway	捨近求遠	Falling into You ending theme song

== Filmography ==
=== Films ===
Year	Title	Chinese Title
2011	The Purple House	紫宅
2012	Seeing	看·見
2013	My Boyfriends	我的男男男男朋友
2013	My Beautiful Kingdom	我的美麗王國
2014	Broadcasting Girl	我的播音系女友
2014	Mystery	秘術
2014	Bloody Doll	怨靈人偶
2016	Cupid Arrow	
2016	Foolish Plans	呆呆計畫
2017	Daddy, Be with Me	
2017	Security	王牌保安
2018	The Faces of My Gene	
2018	Air Strike	大轟炸

Security, which was filmed in Sofia, Bulgaria last November 2015, will be his first U.S. film.

=== Television series ===
Year	Chinese title	English title	Role / Remarks	Co-stars
2002	聽笨金魚唱歌			
2003	新麻辣鮮師	Spicy Teacher	Rou Tian (桑田)	
2004	第八號當舖	The Pawnshop No. 8	Ah Zhe	
2005	惡作劇之吻	It Started with a Kiss	Jin Yuan Feng (金元豐) Kinnosuke Ikezawa	Ariel Lin; Joe Cheng
2005	終極一班	KO One	Wang Da Dong (汪大東)	Calvin Chen; Aaron Yan; Danson Tang
2006	花樣少年少女	Hanazakarino Kimitachihe	Ji Dian (金秀伊) Shuichi Nakatsu	Ella Chen; Wu Chun
2007	終極一家	The X-Family	Xia Lan Xing De Tian (夏蘭荇德‧天) / Wang Da Dong (汪大東) / Gui Long (鬼龍) / Zack	Pauline Lan; Calvin Chen; Danson Tang
2007	惡作劇2吻	They Kiss Again	Jin Yuan Feng (金元豐) Kinnosuke Ikezawa (寺從) Gideon (座)	Ariel Lin; Joe Cheng; Danson Tang
2008	翻滾吧！蛋炒飯	Rolling Love	Mi Qi Lin (米麒麟)	Danson Tang; Genie Chuo; Xiao Xun
2009	愛就宅一起	ToGetHer	Zhuang Jun Nan (莊俊男) aka Mars	Rainie Yang; George Hu
2009	終極三國	K.O.3an Guo	Wang Da Dong (汪大東) / Sun Ce (孙策)	George Hu; Shu Chen
2009	桃花小妹	Momo Love	Shi Lang (史朗)	Cyndi Wang; Wong JingLun; Calvin Chen; Ken Chu
2011	陽光天使	Sunshine Angel	(guest star) Jiro	Wu Chun; Rainie Yang
2012	絕對達令	Absolute Darling	Wan Naite (萬奈特) / Night Tenjo (零壹式)	Ku Hye-sun
2012	姐姐立正向前走	Drama Go! Go! Go!	Eason	Ruby Lin; Lin Gengxin
2012	終極一班2	KO One Return	Wang Da Dong (汪大東)	Pets Tseng
2013	原來是美男	Fabulous Boys	Huang Tai Jing (黃泰京)	Evan Yo; Lyan Cheng; Hwang in Deok
2013	終極一班3	KO One Re-act	Wang Da Dong (汪大東)	Pets Tseng
2013	幸福蒲公英	Blissful Dandelion	(guest star) Nick Sung (宋思瀚)	Danson Tang
2014	終極X宿舍	The X-Dormitory	(guest star) Wang Da Dong (汪大東) / Xia Tian (夏天) / Gui Long (鬼龍)	Pauline Lan
2015	極品女士第四季	Wonder Lady Season 4	(guest star) Wang Zong (汪总)	
2015	只因單身在一起	Singles Villa	Chi Bo Yuan (池博遠)	Xu Lu; Viann Zhang; Joe Cheng
2015	超級大英雄	The Crossing Hero	Hong Xiao Dong (洪曉東) / Hong Xi Dong (洪西東)	Bruce Xie; Hu Yang; Nikki Hsieh; Kirsten Ren
2015	尋找北極光	Looking for Aurora	Zou Jia Long (鄒家龍)	Nichkhun; Rossi Zheng
2016	終極一班4	KO One Re-member	(guest star)Wang Da Dong (汪大東)	Pets Tseng
2016	半妖傾城	Demon Girl	(guest star) You Yuan (幽遠)	Zhe-han Zhang Li Yitong
2017	鎮魂街	Rakshasa Street	Cao Yan Bing (曹焱兵)	Yuexi An
2017	櫻桃小丸子真人版	Maruko TV Drama	Hanawa Kazuhiko	Zoey Lin
2018	萌妃駕到	Mengfei Comes Across	Wen Lou (溫樓)	Gina Jin
	雪女王	The Snow Queen	Gu Zhao Pan (顧照蟠)	Dylan Guo
	西夏死書	Xi Xia Book of Dead	Tang Feng (唐風)	Ting Anne
2020	因爲我喜歡你	Falling Into You	Fang Zhisheng (方至勝)	Puff Guo

== Awards ==
Year	Award	Category	Nominated work	Result
2010	China Entertainment Television Awards	Top 10 Hottest Artists Award		Won
2011	LeTV Film Entertainment Awards	Most Boundary Crossing Artist (Hong Kong and Taiwan)		Won
2012	Mongolian Cow Sour Yogurt Music Billboard	Most Popular Singer		Won
2012	COSMO Beauty Awards	Stylish Model Award		Won
2012	5th Beijing Billboard Music Newcomers Festival	Most Popular Singer		Won
2012	1st International Micro-Film Festival (Nanking)	Most Inspirational Subject Matter	Seeing	Won
2013	China Mengniu Billboard Music Awards	Best New Artist (Hong Kong and Taiwan)		Won
2015	1st Asian Influence Award Oriental Ceremony (Shanghai Oriental Art Center)	Influential Asian Versatile/All-rounder Celebrity		Won
2015	10th Asia Model Festival (Olympic Hall, Olympic Park, Seoul)	Asia Star Award (Overseas)		Won
2015	Metro Radio Mandarin Hits Music Awards	Mandarin Hit Song Award(Exclusive Fortress)/ Most Popular Winning Song Award(Exclusive Fortress)/ Asia's Most Hit Idol		Won

== Solo concerts ==
- May 31, 2013 in Osaka, Japan.
- June 1, 2013 in Kyoto, Japan.
- June 2, 2013 in Tokyo, Japan.
- September 7, 2013 in Beijing, China.
- November 23, 2013 in Shenzhen, China.

== Television – variety programs (as co-host/regular guest) ==
- 2010 : Super King (综艺大國民): premieres June 19, 2010 : CTS
- 2014 : Let's Sing, Kids (中國新聲代): premieres May 31, 2014 : Hunan Broadcasting System
- 2015 : Wonderful Life (精彩好生活): premieres June 14, 2015 : Zhejiang Television
- 2015 : Running Calorie (奔跑卡路里): premieres June 19, 2015 : iQiyi
- 2015 : Flying Man (冲上云霄): premieres July 2015 : Liaoning Television
- 2016: Run for Time (全员加速中第二季): premieres April 29, 2016: Hunan Broadcasting System

== Guest appearances ==
Wang also performed in numerous MVs and commercials before his rise to stardom. He appeared in Fish Leong's (梁靜茹) 分手快樂 MV when he was 19. After the debut of Fahrenheit, he starred with fellow HIM International Music artists, including MVs for Tank (Taiwanese singer) and Liu Li Yang, such as Liu's Smiling Tears (眼淚笑了). Wang has appeared in numerous MVs for Tank, including "If I Was the Memory" (如果我變成回憶), "Give Me Your Love" (給我你的愛), and "KO One" (終極一班). He also features in various S.H.E MVs and Rolling Love co-star Genie Chuo's "Never Ending Rainbow" (Chinese:"永不消失的彩虹"). Wang also stars in his good friend and co-star Pets Tseng's first solo album MV, Just Lose It (不過失去了一點點), which was released on December 9, 2014, exceeding a million views within a month of its release, on both its official YouTube and YinYueTai (Chinese MV) platforms.

- November 27, 2006: Celebrity guest on Kangxi Lai Le to promote Hanazakarino Kimitachihe with fellow cast members Ella Chen, Wu Chun, and Danson Tang
- December 1, 2006: Celebrity guest on 100% Entertainment to promote Hanazakarino Kimitachihe with fellow cast members
- December 4, 2006: Celebrity guest on 我愛黑澀會 to promote Hanazakarino Kimitachihe with fellow cast members
- March 1, 2007: Celebrity guest on 100% Entertainment to promote Hanazakarino Kimitachihe with fellow cast members
- August 2, 2007: Celebrity guest on Kangxi Lai Le to promote The X-Family with fellow cast members
- August 6, 2007: Celebrity guest on 100% Entertainment to promote The X-Family with fellow cast members
- August 7, 2007: Celebrity guest on TVBS program, Queen (hosted by Pauline Lan) to promote The X-Family with fellow cast members
- August 7, 2007: Celebrity guest on 100% Entertainment to promote The X-Family with fellow cast members
- August 20, 2007: Celebrity guest on Gourmet Secrets of the Stars to promote The X-Family with fellow cast members
- May 5, 2008: Celebrity guest on 100% Entertainment with Danson Tang
- May 9, 2008: Celebrity guest on 100% Entertainment to promote Rolling Love with fellow cast members Genie Chuo and Danson Tang
- May 19, 2008: Celebrity guest on 100% Entertainment to promote Rolling Love with fellow cast members
- May 30, 2008: Celebrity guest on 命運好好玩 to promote Rolling Love with Genie Chuo
- February 10, 2009: Celebrity guest on 100% Entertainment to promote ToGetHer with fellow cast members George Hu and Rainie Yang
- February 20, 2009: Celebrity guest on 100% Entertainment to promote ToGetHer with fellow cast members
- February 23, 2009: Celebrity guest on 東風娛樂通 to promote ToGetHer with fellow cast members
- February 25, 2009: Celebrity guest on 命運好好玩 to promote ToGetHer with fellow cast members
- March 23, 2009: Celebrity guest on Kangxi Lai Le to promote ToGetHer with fellow cast members
- June 11, 2010: Celebrity guest on 百萬小學堂 to promote his pictorial book, Van Gogh and Me
- June 21, 2010: Celebrity guest on the entertainment program University to promote Van Gogh and Me
- July 4, 2010: Celebrity guest on 完全娛樂 to promote Van Gogh and Me
- July 6, 2010: Celebrity guest on 《佼個朋友吧》to promote Van Gogh and Me
- July 25, 2010: Celebrity guest on 《海爸王見王》(hosted by Allen Chao) to promote Van Gogh and Me
- August 21, 2010: Celebrity guest on Entertainment-News@Asia (hosted by Patty Hou) to promote Van Gogh and Me with Dong Cheng Wei
- December 16, 2010: Celebrity guest on 《我在你身邊》(hosted by He Jiong and Li Weijia) with Dylan Kuo and Danson Tang in Greece
- August 26, 2011: Celebrity guest on Youku to promote the film The Purple House with director Pan Heng Sheng
- August 27, 2011: Celebrity guest on 《范後感》to promote Van Gogh and Me
- August 17, 2012: Celebrity guest on 百萬小學堂 to promote his solo album What Are You Waiting For
- August 19, 2012: Celebrity guest on Power Sunday to promote What Are You Waiting For
- August 25, 2012: Celebrity guest on Take Me Out, Taiwan to promote What Are You Waiting For
- August 30, 2012: Celebrity guest on 十點名人堂 (hosted by Harlem Yu) to promote What Are You Waiting For
- August 30, 2012: Celebrity guest on Kangxi Lai Le to promote What Are You Waiting For
- September 7, 2012: Celebrity guest on TVBS program, Queen (hosted by Pauline Lan) to promote What Are You Waiting For
- September 7, 2012: Celebrity guest on 100% Entertainment to promote What Are You Waiting For
- September 12, 2012: Celebrity guest on 《型男大主廚》 to promote What Are You Waiting For with Dylan Kuo
- October 14, 2012: Celebrity guest on 《今晚80后脱口秀》 to promote What Are You Waiting For
- October 20, 2012: Celebrity guest on Happy Camp (variety show) with Ruby Lin to promote their new drama series, Drama Go! Go! Go!
- November 1, 2012: Celebrity guest on 《百变大咖秀》 with Ruby Lin to promote Drama Go! Go! Go! and What Are You Waiting For
- November 9, 2012: Celebrity guest on the variety program 《年代秀》 to promote What Are You Waiting For
- November 23, 2012: Celebrity guest on the variety program 《非常不一班》 to promote What Are You Waiting For
- December 25, 2012: Celebrity guest on 100% Entertainment to promote KO One Return with fellow cast members Pets Tseng and Hwang in Deok
- December 28, 2012: Celebrity guest on 100% Entertainment to promote KO One Return with fellow cast members
- January 3, 2013: Celebrity guest on 100% Entertainment to promote KO One Return with fellow cast members
- January 12, 2013: Celebrity guest on 100% Entertainment to promote KO One Return with fellow cast members
- July 13, 2013: Celebrity guest on 100% Entertainment to promote KO One Re-act with fellow cast members
- July 26, 2013: Celebrity guest on 100% Entertainment to promote KO One Re-act with female lead Pets Tseng
- October 3, 2013: Celebrity guest on Tencent program, 《幸福男女》 (hosted by Ah Ya (阿雅)) to promote his solo concert
- November 5, 2013: Celebrity guest on TVBS program, Queen (hosted by Pauline Lan)
- November 23, 2013: Celebrity guest on Happy Camp (variety show) with Nicky Wu and Lu Yi (actor)
- December 15, 2013: Celebrity guest on the variety program《音樂無雙》(hosted by Calvin Chen)
- March 8, 2014: Celebrity guest on Hunan Television's 《疯狂的麦咭》
- March 22, 2014: Celebrity guest on Hunan Television's 《疯狂的麦咭》
- November 6, 2014: Celebrity guest on TVBS program, Queen (hosted by Pauline Lan)
- December 19, 2014: Celebrity guest on Hunan Television program, Grade One
- December 22, 2014: Celebrity guest on Hunan Television's web-based program,《偶像萬萬碎》
- January 3, 2015: Celebrity guest on Hunan Television's 《疯狂的麦咭》
- January 10, 2015: Celebrity guest on Happy Camp (variety show) to promote Singles Villa
- January 22, 2015: Celebrity guest on Hunan Television's variety program, Laugh Out Loud to promote Singles Villa
- February 25, 2015: Celebrity guest on Azio TV's program, City Color (hosted by Calvin Chen and Patty Hou)
- February 26, 2015: Celebrity guest on Azio TV's program, City Color (hosted by Calvin Chen and Patty Hou)
- February 27, 2015: Celebrity guest on Hunan Television's program, 《天天向上》
- April 6, 2015: Celebrity guest on Kangxi Lai Le
- April 16, 2015: Celebrity guest on ZheJiang Satellite TV's program, 青春练习生 (Youth Trainees) – leader of the Shenzhen station
- April 16, 2015: Celebrity guest on SS小燕之夜 to promote The Crossing Hero with Nikki Hsieh, Jimmy Hung, and Jeff Zhang
- April 17, 2015: Celebrity guest on Shenzhen Satellite TV's program, Men vs. Women (《男左女右》)
- April 18, 2015: Celebrity guest on 100% Entertainment to promote The Crossing Hero
- April 23, 2015: Celebrity guest on ZheJiang Satellite TV's program, 青春练习生 (Youth Trainees) – leader of the Shenzhen station
- May 1, 2015: Celebrity guest on Taiwan's Public Television Services' program, Guess Who (《誰來晚餐》)
- June 19, 2015: Celebrity guest on Jiangsu Television's program, The Exploration of the World – Japan stop

== Publications ==
- June 9, 2010 : Van Gogh And Me – All About Jiro (梵谷與我：汪東城的字‧畫‧像) – ISBN 978-986-6606-87-8. Jiro visited Amsterdam, the Netherlands for this book

== Other events/appearances ==
- June 11, 2011: Promoting The Purple House at the Shanghai Film and Television Festival
- August 17, 2011: M JO and One Piece Crossover Show (Hong Kong)
- September 17, 2011: Vogue (magazine) Fashion Night Out (Taiwan)
- March 12, 2012: Promoting KO One Return at the Hong Kong International Film and Television press conference with Pets Tseng
- April 14, 2012: Absolute Darling promotional activities (Singapore)
- April 22, 2012: Autograph session for Absolute Darling OST
- April 27, 2012: Absolute Darling promotional activities (Taiwan)
- May 2, 2012: Guest performer at Dong Cheng Wei mini-concert
- April 26, 2012: American Eagle Outfitters event (Hong Kong)
- June 14, 2012: Promoting Drama Go! Go! Go! with Ruby Lin at the Shanghai Film and Television Festival
- November 24, 2012: Grand opening of An Ning Jewellery (Beijing, China)
- November 28, 2012: Premiere for the microfilm Seeing and launch of Syinlu's 799 philanthropic program (Taiwan)
- December 15, 2012: Sale of M JO Christmas limited edition at Miramar Shopping Centre (Hong Kong)
- December 31, 2012: New Year's Eve countdown performance (Guangzhou, China)
- January 1, 2013: Fan meeting and autograph session for his album, What Are You Waiting For (Shenzhen, Guangdong, China)
- January 26, 2013: Chivas Regal event (Chengdu, China)
- February 16, 2013: Guest at Pets Tseng's concert
- March 8, 2013: Isetan Samantha Thavasa event (Shanghai, China)
- March 10, 2013: KO One Return fan meeting (Taiwan)
- March 23, 2013: SK-II event (Hangzhou, China)
- March 25, 2013: Media press conference for Drama Go! Go! Go! (Taiwan)
- March 30, 2013: Invited performer at 2013 Super Girls Festa (Live)
- April 18, 2013: KO One Re-act press conference (Taiwan)
- April 20, 2013: Lovemore event (Hong Kong)
- April 21, 2013: Guest appearance at the media reception for GTV's new program (Taiwan)
- April 27, 2013: Chivas Regal event (Chongqing, China)
- May 2, 2013: Radio interview for Fabulous Boys
- May 18, 2013: Lovemore event at Poya, Kaohsiung (Taiwan)
- June 8, 2013: Autograph session for Fabulous Boys OST (Taiwan)
- June 15, 2012: Promoting his new horror film Bloody Doll at the 16th Shanghai Film and Television Festival
- June 29, 2013: guest star at Rainie Yang's Genting Highlands concert (Malaysia)
- July 3, 2013: KO One Re-act press conference (Taiwan)
- July 6, 2013: Invited guest at Tiger Beer's Battle of the Bands (Changzhou, China)
- July 20, 2013: Chivas Regal Mix Club with Dong Cheng Wei band members, Shu and Deng (Beijing, China)
- August 4, 2013: Promotional activities for KO One Re-act (Taiwan)
- August 9, 2013: Guest performer at the Sprite Star Basketball Friendly Match 2013 with Kobe Bryant, Jay Chou, Wu Chun, and other Chinese celebrities (Shanghai, China)
- August 10, 2013: Wanda Mall's 1st anniversary celebrations (Jinjiang, Fujian, China)
- August 24, 2013: Birthday fan meeting (Taiwan)
- September 1, 2013: Grand opening of Luckycity (Tianjin, China)
- September 2, 2013: Evening Show with Dong Cheng Wei band members, Shu and Deng (Shenzhen, China)
- September 5, 2013: Youku interview – celebrating the online ratings success of KO One Re-act (Beijing, China)
- September 6, 2013: Pre-concert autograph session (Beijing, China)
- September 19, 2013: Mid-Autumn celebration at Wanda Mall (Dalian, China)
- September 27, 2013: Intime City's 4th anniversary celebrations (Zhejiang, China)
- October 2, 2013: Invited celebrity guest at the premiere of Young Detective Dee: Rise of the Sea Dragon
- October 26, 2013: Coca-Cola event (Wenzhou, China)
- November 7, 2013: Promotional activities for his film My Boyfriends (Chengdu, China)
- November 8, 2013: Promotional activities for his film My Boyfriends (Guangzhou, China)
- November 9, 2013: Promotional activities for his film My Boyfriends (Beijing, China)
- November 10, 2013: Pre-concert media press conference (Shenzhen, China)
- November 16, 2013: Promotional activities for Fabulous Boys OST (Japan)
- December 1, 2013: Invited guest – Freemore's Free Dance competition (Sichuan, Chengdu, China)
- December 3, 2013: Interview with Tencent as producer of drama series, The Crossing Hero (Shanghai, China)
- December 15, 2013: Clear event (Chongqing, China)
- December 19, 2013: Media press conference for My Broadcasting Girlfriend (Nantong, Jiangsu, China)
- December 22, 2013: Coca-Cola event (Zhengzhou, China)
- December 31, 2013: New Year's Eve countdown performance (Guangzhou, China)
- March 8, 2014: Taobao Shopping Fest at Central Walk Shopping Mall (Shenzhen, China)
- March 14, 2014: Lovemore event at Mannings (Guangzhou, China)
- April 15, 2014: Interview for his film My Broadcasting Girlfriend (Beijing, China)
- April 16, 2014: Media press conference for My Broadcasting Girlfriend (Beijing, China)
- April 16, 2014: Promoting My Broadcasting Girlfriend at the Beijing International Film Festival
- April 26, 2014: Hot Lips, Hot Music at Forum 66 (Shenyang, China)
- May 6, 2014: Grand opening of WoMen Hair (Taipei, Taiwan)
- May 14, 2014: Promotional activities for My Broadcasting Girlfriend (Fuzhou, China)
- May 14, 2014: Promotional activities for My Broadcasting Girlfriend (Beijing, China)
- May 29, 2014: World Trade Centre (Hong Kong)
- June 29, 2014: Coca-Cola event (Fuzhou, Xiamen, China)
- October 27, 2014: H.Linx (Hangzhou, China)
- November 4, 2014: Media reception for the drama series Singles Villa (Changsha, China)
- November 22, 2014: Eral fashion label (Shenyang, China)
- November 29, 2014: Grand opening of Xiasha Powerlong Shopping Complex (Hangzhou, China)
- December 6, 2014: Zhongnan City Shopping Mall's 3rd anniversary celebrations (Nantong, Jiangsu, China)
- December 14, 2014: Celebrity guest at motor event 《中國飄移冠軍》 (Quanzhou, China)
- December 21, 2014: Grand opening of Powerlong Shopping Complex (Tianjin, China)
- December 24, 2014: Celebrity guest at Folli Follie event (Zhangjiagang, China)
- December 25, 2014: Celebrity guest at La Côrde Homme's Christmas event (Ningbo, China)
- December 28, 2014: Media press conference for Singles Villa (Changsha, China)
- December 31, 2014: Countdown Show 2015 at East Point City (Hong Kong)
- January 1, 2015: Celebrity guest at Folli Follie event in Kaihong Mall (Zhoushan, Zhejiang, China)
- January 9, 2015: Celebrity guest at Happy New Nine event (Chengdu, China)
- January 17, 2015: Promoting the television serial, Singles Villa (Shanghai, China)
- February 6, 2015: Interview with Tencent Comic (Beijing, China)
- February 14, 2015: Celebrity guest at Wanda Movie Park's Valentine's Day event (Wuhan, China)
- March 7, 2015: SK-II event (Nanking, China)
- March 15, 2015: Press conference for Wang's new film with Jordan Chan, 《槑計劃》 (Shenzhen, China)
- March 20, 2015: Dragon Ball Z Special Exhibition: Science Fair (Songshan, Taipei, Taiwan)
- April 2, 2015: Press conference for The Crossing Hero (Taiwan)
- May 1, 2015: Celebrity guest at Suning Plaza's event (Chengdu, China)
- May 2, 2015: Celebrity guest at Suning Plaza's event (Wuxi, China)
- May 4, 2015: Chibi Maruko-chan's 25th Anniversary Special Exhibition in Taiwan – pre-ticketing press conference
- May 7, 2015: Press conference for the movie, 《槑计划》 (Foolish Plan) (Jeju Island, South Korea)
- May 19, 2015: Celebrity guest for Taiwan's Marvel Entertainment exhibition
- May 27, 2015: Press conference for Liaoning Television's new reality program, 《冲上云霄》 (Flying Man) (Beijing, China)
- June 18, 2015: Press conference for the launch of Chibi Maruko-chan's 25th anniversary exhibition in Taiwan (Huashan 1914 Creative Park, Taipei, Taiwan)
- June 19, 2015: Celebrity guest for Philips event at Super Brand Mall (Lujiazui, Shanghai, China)
- June 20, 2015: Presenter at the 18th Shanghai International Film Festival (Shanghai, China)
