= KO One Return =

Taiwanese television series

- Also known as: 終極一班2; Zhōng Jí Yī Bān 2
- Genre: School, Comedy, Fantasy, Action, Romance, Wuxia
- Written by: Cai Qiu Yi (蔡秋怡) / Yu Yuan Yuan (禹元元)
- Directed by: Ke Zheng Ming (柯政銘) / Lin Qing Fang (林清芳)
- Starring: Jiro Wang; Pets Tseng; Sam; Brent; Sylvia Wang
- Opening theme: "發飆" by SpeXial
- Ending theme: "一個人想著一個人" by Pets Tseng
- Country of origin: Republic of China (Taiwan)
- Original language: Mandarin
- No. of episodes: 30

Production
- Production location: Taipei, Taiwan
- Running time: 45 mins

Original release
- Network: Gala Television (GTV)
- Release: December 26, 2012 – February 3, 2013

Related
- KO One; The X-Family; K.O.3an Guo; KO One Re-act; The X-Dormitory; Angel 'N' Devil; KO ONE: RE-MEMBER; K.O.3an Guo 2017; KO ONE: RE-CALL

KO One Return (traditional Chinese: 終極一班2; simplified Chinese: 终极一班2; pinyin: zhōng jí yī bān 2; literally: "The Ultimate Class 2") is a 2012 Taiwanese drama starring Jiro Wang, Pets Tseng, Sam, Brent, and Sylvia Wang. It was produced by Comic International Productions (可米國際影視事業股份有限公司) and Gala Television, it was wrapped on July 7, 2012. it was first broadcast in Taiwan on cable TV Gala Television (GTV) Variety Show/CH 28 (八大綜合台) on December 26, 2012 to February 5, 2013.

== Synopsis ==
While bringing the real Liu Bei back to the Silver Dimension, Wang Da Dong (Jiro Wang) encounters an inter-dimensional timequake and is transported ten years into the future. He lands in the girls' gym of Ba Le High School, his high school, and finds that all power-users have mysteriously disappeared and he lost all of his powers. Zhong Ji Yi Ban, or the Ultimate Class, is now led by a girl named King (Pets Tseng). He decides to once again enroll into Ba Le High School and return to the Ultimate Class to investigate the disappearance of powers and his friends. As he investigates the mystery, he constantly runs into conflicts with his classmates, especially King.

== Cast ==
=== Main characters ===
Wang Da Dong (汪大東) portrayed by Jiro Wang

The past leader of "Zhong Ji Yi Ban" (終極一班 / Ultimate Class). Self-confident and stubborn yet extremely loyal and charismatic. While trying to bring Liu Bei back to the Silver Dimension (a reference to K.O.3an Guo), he experienced a tinequake while transported him 10 years into the future of the Gold Dimension. He wakes up to see that his high school, Ba Le High School, has changed. He loses his powers to wield the "Long Wen Ao" (龍紋鏊 / Dragon Tattooed Pan), his weapon that varies its master's fighting count according to the opponent's fighting count.

King or Lei Ting (雷婷) portrayed by Pets Tseng

King is the current leader of the Ultimate Class and the heir to Lei Corporation. She portrays herself as a strong and unfeminine person despite wanting to be feminine like all the other girls but is reluctant to do so as people view her as a weak person. She has exceptional fighting skills and strikes fear to all other students. To her classmates in the Ultimate Class, she is understanding and caring and will do anything to help her classmates when they are in trouble. She is the love interest of Zhong Wan Jun and is dating Zhong Wan Jun after the return from their time travel mission.

Zhong Wan Jun (中萬鈞) portrayed by Sam

He is one of the members of the Ultimate Class. Lei Ting is his childhood best friend and crush. He is extremely protective of her, going as far as to risking his own life. His cold, indifferent personality isolates him from the rest of his class.

=== Other cast ===
Students of the Ultimate Class

- Xu Ming Jie as Hua Ling Long (花靈龍)
- Hwang In Deok as Ling (令) (starting ep13)
- Sylvia Wang (文雨非) as Qiu Qiu (裘球) / Xiao Long Nu (小聾女)
- Xiao Hou as what's-his-name (那個誰)
  - Su Pin Jie (蘇品傑) as child what's-his-name
- Zhang Hao Ming as Jin Bao San (金寶三)
- Lu Shi Wei (呂世偉) as Cheng Chi (撐喫)
- Xie Kai Zhong (謝凱仲) as Ai Hen (愛恨)
- Huang Niu (Champion's 黃牛) as Geng Lie (耿烈) (starting ep22)
- Lin Yi Xun (林奕勳) as Bass (starting ep22)
- Lin Yue De (林岳德) as Da Bu Dian (大不點)
- Xiao Bu Dian (小不點) as Xiao Bu Dian (小不點)
- Li Bo Xiang (李博翔) as A Xiang (阿翔)
- Zhou Xian Zhong (周賢忠) as A Zhong (阿忠)
- Chen Yu Ze (陳允澤) as A Peng (阿蹦)
- Sun You An (孫尤安) as Sha Sha (莎莎)
- Chen Yu Jie (陳鈺潔) as Ting Ting (婷婷)
- Qiu Man Ling (邱蔓菱) as Bao Bao (寶寶)

The Faculty

- Na Wei Xun as Duan Chang Ren 斷腸人 / Hei Long 黑龍 / Ye Si Ren 葉思仁
- Erica Liu (劉伊心) as Huang Fei 黃菲
- Hsia Ching Ting as Jia Yong 賈勇
- Ye Hui Zhi (葉蕙芝) as Gu Wen Jing 古文靜
- Jian Han Zhong (簡漢宗/簡翰忠) as Su Bu Qi 蘇布啓
- Shimomura Soushi (下村蒼史) as Ai Xiao Yi 艾孝一

Peach High School

- Zhao Fei Yun (趙菲芸) as Lin Qing Qing 林青青
- Yang Kai Lin (楊凱琳) as Princess Peach 桃子公主

Others

- Bernice Tsai as Cai Wu Xiong 蔡五熊 (starting ep23)
- Ba Yu as A Ji Shi 阿雞師
- Chen De Xiu as Liu Bei 劉備 / Xiu 脩
- Deng Hua Dun (鄧樺敦) as Dong Cheng Wei-Deng 東城衛-鐙
- Li Ming Han (李明翰) as Dong Cheng Wei-Ming 東城衛-冥
- Michael Chen (陳志介) as Dong Cheng Wei-Jie 東城衛-戒
- Ma Tai (馬太) as Dongbei gangster 東北區老大
- Xu Shi Hao (許時豪) as Da Mu Ge 大拇哥
- Qian Yu An (錢俞安) as Er Mu Di 二姆弟
- Liu Xing (劉行) as Hei Gou 黑狗
- Lu Yi En (盧以恩) as Ling Ling 玲玲
- Frankie Huang as Xiang Huai Ren 項懷仁
- Wang Zi Qiang (王自強) as Lao Sun 老孫
- Huang Wei Ting as Xiao Jie 小潔
- Yin Zhao De (尹昭德) as what's-his-name's father 那個父
- Qiu De Yang (邱德洋) as Chen Zheng Yi 陳正義
- Angie Tang as Granny Hao 郝婆婆
- Zhao Shun as Village leader 老村長
- Anthony as Lin Qi Xuan 林啟軒
- Gou Feng (勾峰) as King's grandfather

== Soundtrack ==
No.	Title	Singer	Length
1.	"發飆"	SpeXial	3:20
2.	"一個人想著一個人"	Pets Tseng	4:04
3.	"SpeXial Gou Gou"	SpeXial	3:05
4.	"數不盡的星空"	Pets Tseng	4:33
5.	"我想我需要時間"	SpeXial	4:17
6.	"對我好一點"	Sylvia Wang	3:19
