= Foolish Plans =

- Poster
- Chinese: 发条城市
- Directed by: Jiang Tao
- Starring: Wang Ning; Xiu Rui; Wang Zijian; Wang Ou; Liu Yase; Chen Yang
- Production companies: Beijing Juhe Yinglian Media; Hunan Churen Media; Beijing Houde Yonghe New Media Copyright Investment; Beijing Shengji Entertainment; Shanghai Huada Pictures; Hunan Fatiao City Media; Beijing Hangmei Entertainment; Shenzhen Jinqiangwei Media; Beijing Shangfeng Entertainment
- Distributed by: Beijing Juhe Yinglian Media
- Release date: July 8, 2016
- Country: China
- Language: Mandarin

Foolish Plans is a 2016 Chinese adventure comedy film directed by Jiang Tao and starring Wang Ning, Xiu Rui, Wang Zijian, Wang Ou, Liu Yase and Chen Yang. It was released in China by Beijing Juhe Yinglian Media and in North America by United Entertainment Partners on July 8, 2016.

== Plot ==
Three brothers with different personalities but close friendship work as prop masters in a film production company. The eldest brother, Song Ge, is smarter than a monkey, the second brother, Xiao Feng, is simple and honest, and the third brother, A Zheng, is humorous and emotional. The three brothers got involved in a nonsensical murder case with Jiao Yang due to a financial dispute.

== Cast ==
- Wang Ning
- Xiu Rui
- Wang Zijian
- Wang Ou
- Liu Yase
- Chen Yang
- Wang Yanhui
