= KO One Re-Act =

Taiwanese drama

- Also known as: 終極一班3; Zhōng Jí Yī Bān 3
- Genre: School, Comedy, Fantasy, Action, Romance, Wuxia
- Written by: Zhou Xiang Ching (鄒湘秦)、Shao Hui Ting (邵慧婷)、Yang Guan Hua (楊官樺)、He Su Fen (何素芬)
- Directed by: Lin Qing Fang (林清芳)
- Starring: Jiro Wang; Pets Tseng; Sam; Brent; Wes; Wayne; Sylvia Wang
- Opening theme: "Super Style" by SpeXial
- Ending theme: "一個人還是想著一個人" by Pets Tseng
- Country of origin: Republic of China (Taiwan)
- Original language: Mandarin
- No. of episodes: 20

Production
- Production location: Taipei, Taiwan
- Running time: 90 mins

Original release
- Network: Gala Television (GTV)
- Release: July 5 – November 15, 2013

Related
- KO One; The X-Family; K.O.3an Guo; KO One Return; The X-Dormitory; Angel 'N' Devil; KO ONE: RE-MEMBER; K.O.3an Guo 2017; KO ONE: RE-CALL

KO One Re-Act (traditional Chinese: 終極一班3; simplified Chinese: 终极一班3; pinyin: zhōng jí yī bān 3; literally: "The Ultimate Class 3") is a 2013 Taiwanese drama series starring Jiro Wang, Pets Tseng, Sam, Brent, Wes, Wayne, and Sylvia Wang. The 20-episode series was produced by Comic International Productions (可米國際影視事業股份有限公司) and Gala Television, it started filming on April 22, 2013 and wrapped on September 10, 2013. it was first broadcast in Taiwan on cable channel Gala Television (GTV) Variety Show/CH 28 (八大綜合台) on July 5, 2013 to November 15, 2013.

== Synopsis ==
After the events of KO One Return, the timeline reset and the KO ranking are restored, and we see the return of some familiar faces from Season 1 and 2.

The 28-year-old Wang Da Dong is a member of inter-dimensional guards together with Xiu. Da Dong goes undercover to investigate the unusual spikes in fighting power in his former high school, Ba Le High School caused by an illegal drug, Hell Vision, as a dropout repeating high school student. His first order of business is to reestablish his authority inside the class of KO One. His behavior immediately clashes with the current leader, King. While the class looks on to see who would emerge victorious, the competition for leadership intensifies with new transfer students joining the fray, including Gu Zhan, the KO.3 tied with Lei Ting and Zhi Ge, the secret KO.2, and Li Yan Yan, the KO.10. Throughout the series he eventually bonds (again) with all his new classmates and begins a relationship with Lei Ting.

== Cast ==
=== Main characters ===
- Jiro Wang as Wang Da Dong (汪大東), the past leader of "Zhong Ji Yi Ban" (Ko One). Self-confident and stubborn yet extremely loyal and charismatic.
- Pets Tseng as Lei Ting (雷婷) (King) KO.3, King is the current leader of the "Zhong Ji Yi Ban" (Ko One). She portrays herself as a strong and unfeminine person despite wanting to be feminine like all the other girls but is reluctant to do so as people view her as a weak person. She has exceptional fighting skills and strikes fear to all other students. To her classmates in the Ko one, she is understanding and caring and will do anything to help her classmates when they are in trouble.
- Sam as Zhong Wan Jun (中萬鈞) KO.4 → KO.1, Lei Ting is his childhood best friend and who he has crush on. He is extremely protective of her, going as far as to risking his own life. His cold, indifferent personality isolates him from the rest of his class.

"Zhong Ji Yi Ban" (Ko One) Class

- Xu Ming Jie as Hua Ling Long 花靈龍 KO.6 → KO.5, Hua Ling Long is an attractive, rich and handsome guy who managed to capture the hearts of many girls in Ba Le High School and a Ba Le Prince for consecutive two years.
- Wang Yi Wen as Qiu Qiu 裘球 KO.9 → KO.7, similar to her KO One Return self, she likes to pull pranks. However, she is much more invested on other things such as working. This is largely due to the fact her family is heavily in debt. She isn't afraid of fighting people when necessary but will avoid try to involved bystanders. She has a crush on Zhong Wan Jun ever since they first met, always makes the effort to secretly place a packet of milk on his table. Later in the series, Qiu Qiu confessed to Zhong Wan Jun, but got rejected.
- Zhang Hao Ming as Jin Bao San 金寶三, a 28-year-old high school repeat, prankster and comic relief
- Xiao Hou as what's-his-name 那個誰 KO.8 → KO.6
- Ba Yu as A Ji Shi 阿雞師
- Zhuang Kai Bo (莊凱博) as Jian Bu Duan 簡不斷
- Wang Bo Ren (王柏人) as Li Lai Luan 李來亂
- Huang Wei Hao (黃緯豪) as Dian Bu Xiao 點不小
- Li Hao (李浩) as Wu Ou 巫喔
- Xie Wu Long (謝武龍) as Ji Huan Zhu 金華豬
- Huang Wei Zhi (黃韋智) as Bai Zhu 白豬
- Zhou Bing Kuan (周秉寬) as Hei Zhu 黑豬
- Wang Chun Ling (王惇鈴) as Miss A
- You Nian Yu (游念育) as Miss B
- Li Ming Zhen (李明臻) as Miss C

The Faculty

- Melody as Homeroom teacher Tian Xin 田欣, an imposter who impersonate Tian Xin ( Former mentor and English teacher of the previous Ko one class) to spy on Wang Da Dong and the current Ko One class.
- Hsia Ching Ting as Jia Yong 賈勇, the current principal of Ba Le High School
- Ye Hui Zhi (葉蕙芝) as Gu Wen Jing 古文靜, Chinese teacher at Ba Le High School and wife of Jia Yong
- Jian Han Zong (簡漢宗/簡翰忠) as Su Bu Qi 蘇布啓, the drillmaster of Ba Le High School.
- Nylon Chen as Cao Ji Li 曹吉利, P.E. Teacher of Ba Le High School, Revealed to be a demon fighter who has been secret investigating the unusual spikes in fighting power in Ba Le High School.
- Emily Tsai as Cai Yun Han 蔡雲寒, former classmate of Da Dong and Jin Bao San from ten years ago and police officer. New homeroom teacher of Ko one class
- Na Wei Xun as Duan Chang Ren 斷腸人, school food shop owner, twin brother of Hei Long. Friend of Wang Da Dong who seeks advice and help from time to time.

Banana High School

- Luo Hong Zheng as Gu Zhan 辜戰 KO. 3, transferred from Banana High school to Ba Le High School, Gu Zhan was known as the 'Underground Trio' along with Zhi Ge and Li Yan Yan. At first he tried to steal the title of "King" from Lei Ting but later with the help of Wang Da Dong, he was gradually accepted as a strong and powerful student of the Ko one class. He later developed feelings for Qiu Qiu and helped her overcome the grief that she was facing because of Zhong Wan Jun's rejection.
- Huang Wei Jin (黃偉晉) as Zhi Ge 止戈 KO.2, transferred from Banana High school to Ba Le High School, Zhi Ge was known as the 'Underground Trio' along with Gu Zhan and Li Yan Yan. Best friend of Gu Zhan and Li Yan Yan.
- Huang An Yu (黃安瑜/蕊蕊) as Li Yan Yan 厲嫣嫣 KO. 10 → KO.8, Transferred from Banana High school to Ba Le High School, Li Yan Yan was known as the 'Underground Trio' along with Gu Zhan and Zhi Ge. Best friend of Gu Zhan and Li Yan Yan. She is the quiet and silent one in trio.
- Xia Yu Tong (夏宇童) as Luo Xiao Li 蘿小莉 KO.7, a student of Banana High School who has crush on Gu Zhan and jealous of Li Yan Yan. She is also one of people that use the illegal drug, Hell Vision to increased her fighting power temporary to challenge other K0 fighters to increase her rank.

Other Supporting Characters

- Na Wei Xun as Hei Long, Twin brother of Duan Chang Ren. The main antagonist of season 1 who returns with his power somehow restored. Served as secondary antagonist.
- Na Wei Xun as Ye Si Ti/Sun Jian (孫堅), the antagonist of the third season of K.O.3an Guo. He apparently survived his demise at the end of K.O.3an Guo and simply transported to the Gold Dimension from Silver Dimension. He served as the main antagonist. He is also the one behind the creation of Hell Vision. He is the alternate counterpart of Duan Chang Ren and Hei Long from Iron Dimension who was raised up in the Silver Dimension.
- Qin Yang (秦楊) as Zhi Ge's father, an overprotective father and businessman. Revealed to be an old friend of Duan Chang Ren and Hei Long
- Chen De Xiu as Xiu 脩, leader of inter-dimensional guards from Iron Dimension and good friend of Da Dong.
- Deng Hua Dun (鄧樺敦) as Deng 鐙
- Li Ming Han (李明翰) as Ming 冥
- Michael Chen (陳志介) as Jie 戒
- Chen Bo Zheng as Wang Tian Yang 汪天養, father of Da Dong, former assassin known as "Dao Feng" (刀瘋).
- A Jiao (阿嬌/謝雅琳) as Ceng Mei Hao 曾美好, mother of Da Dong, she was known as "Dao Gui" (刀鬼); an infamous weapon inventor and a former assassin.
- NONO as Sa Bi Si 薩必四 KO.79
- Xu Ya Qi (許亞琦) as Xiao Qin 小芹
- Wu Jian He (巫建和) as Xiao Yu 小煜
- Xiao Bing (小炳) as Ji Yi Wei member 緊衣衛成員
- Li Bing Hui (李炳輝) as Fortune teller 摸骨師
- Wang Zi Qiang (王自強) as Lao Sun 老孫
- Ariel Ann as Hua Fu Long 花伏龍
- Gao Li Hong (高麗虹) as Mrs. Hu 胡媽媽
- Masuyama Yuki as Secretary Li 李秘書
- Ma Li Ou (馬利歐) as Shi Ren Qing 史仁強
- Liu Xing (劉行) as Hei Gou 黑狗
- Xiao Bu Dian (小不點) as Babo vendor
- Wu Zhen Ya (吳震亞) as Jin Yi Wei leader 緊衣衛老大
- Huang Shi Yang as Xiao Qin
- Ying Cai Ling (應采靈) as Gu Jing 辜靜

== Music ==
No.	Title	Singer	Length
1.	"Super Style"	SpeXial	3:38
2.	"一個人還是想著一個人"	Pets Tseng	4:46
3.	"為愛戰鬥"	SpeXial	3:27
4.	"數不盡的星空"	Pets Tseng	4:33
5.	"小路亂撞"	Pets Tseng	3:04
