= KO One =

2005 Taiwanese drama

- Promotional poster
- Also known as: 終極一班; Zhōng Jí Yī Bān
- Genre: School, Comedy, Fantasy, Action, Romance, Wuxia
- Written by: Qi Xi Lin (齊鍚麟) / Lan Jin Xiang (藍今翔)
- Directed by: Liao Fei Hong (廫猆鴻)
- Starring: Jiro Wang; Calvin Chen; Aaron Yan; Stephanie Lee; Melody; Sunnie Huang; Danson Tang
- Opening theme: "終極一班" (Extreme Class) by Tank
- Ending theme: "給我你的愛" (Give Me Your Love) by Tank
- Country of origin: Republic of China (Taiwan)
- Original language: Mandarin
- No. of episodes: 21 (list of episodes)

Production
- Producer: Chen Zi Han (陳芷涵) / Wang Xin Gue (王信貴) / Liu Xing (劉行)
- Production locations: Taipei, Taiwan
- Running time: 70 mins
- Production company: Comic International Productions

Original release
- Network: Gala Television (GTV)
- Release: 26 November 2005 – 27 May 2006

Related
- The X-Family; K.O.3an Guo; KO One Return; KO One Re-act; The X-Dormitory; Angel 'N' Devil; KO ONE: RE-MEMBER; K.O.3an Guo 2017; KO ONE: RE-CALL

KO One (traditional Chinese: 終極一班; simplified Chinese: 终极一班; pinyin: zhōng jí yī bān; lit. 'The Ultimate Class') is a 2005 Taiwanese drama starring Jiro Wang, Calvin Chen, Aaron Yan and Danson Tang. It was produced by Comic International Productions (可米國際影視事業股份有限公司) and Gala Television, it was first broadcast in Taiwan on cable TV Gala Television (GTV) Variety Show/CH 28 (八大綜合台) on November 26, 2005 to May 27, 2006.

Before this drama was aired there was not much interest in it, due to the storyline and unfamiliar cast. Despite the new encounters, the ratings of KO One exceeded expectations. Although the ratings were not high, it brought fame to three of the four leads (Jiro Wang, Calvin Chen, Aaron Yan), who are part of the then newly formed Taiwanese boy band called Fahrenheit. This drama also brought fame to the Taiwanese artist, Tank who wrote and sang the opening and ending theme songs. The KO One original soundtrack was the best selling soundtrack of 2013, selling more than 60,000 copies in Taiwan within the first month of release.

On December 26, 2012, a new series is released at the same time on GTV, named KO One Return, which continues the story of KO One.

== Synopsis ==
Zhong Ji Yi Ban is a class in Ba Le High School designed especially for the delinquents and rejects that other high schools would not accept. Even so, everyone in the class is loyal to the leader, Wang Da Dong (Jiro Wang), who is KO.3, and would die for friends. Another KO. 3, Wang Ya Se, also called Ya Se Wang (Calvin Chen), and KO.4, Ding Xiao Yu (Aaron Yan) soon join the class and out of some fortuitous events, their lives become tied together and they become best buddies. Another student, Lei Ke Si (Danson Tang), who had been gone for a whole semester, rejoins the class. Although Lei Ke Si seems like a weak kid with only good intentions, Ya Se suspects Lei Ke Si is KO.2 because legends say that KO.1 and KO.2 are capable of concealing their true identities.

At the same time, incidents start to occur and the culprit always leads to Ya Se. Ya Se is actually being framed by Lei Ke Si, who is actually the real culprit. Lei Ke Si makes Ya Se look bad so that Da Dong won't believe him when he says that Lei Ke Si is KO.2. Soon, An Qi, who is Da Dong's and Lei Ke Si's childhood crush, appears. Lei Ke Si reveals his true identity as KO.2 and fights Da Dong for An Qi. After Lei Ke Se leaves the class, Xiao Yu starts to crush on An Qi. Both Da Dong and Xiao Yu fight over An Qi, but Da Dong doesn't realize his crush on the teacher of KO One, Tian Xin (Melody) until An Qi tells him. An Qi decides to return to America. Soon after, two new female students join the class. One of them is Cai Wu Xiong (Bernice Tsai) who develops a crush on Ya Se. In the beginning, he refuses to accept her due to her gorilla-like behavior, but he eventually falls in love with her. At the end, Lei Ke Si returns to tell the class the secret to defeating their enemy, Hei Long. In the final battle, Da Dong, Ya Se, Xiao Yu and Lei Ke Si combine their powers to defeat the evil roaming around them, but the fight triggers a big explosion that causes both forces to lose their powers.

== Characters ==
=== Main characters ===
Wang Da Dong (汪大東)

The ringleader of the school gang "Zhong Ji Yi Ban" (終極一班 / Ultimate Class). Self-confident and stubborn. Acting like an obedient child at home, he keep his parents in the dark about his school life. Everybody in Zhong Ji Yi Ban listens to him.

Da Dong is number three on the KO Rank and has the battle level of 9,000.

Although Da Dong seems harsh and cold, he is actually a good person at heart and shows his caring side whenever his friends need help.

He carries the "Long Wen Ao" (龍紋鏊 / Dragon Tattooed Pan) as his primary weapon. The unique aspect of this weapon is that it can vary its master's fighting count according to the opponent's fighting count; it becomes stronger when fighting strong opponents and remains normal when facing weaker ones (遇強則強、遇弱則弱).

Wang Ya Se (王亞瑟)

The son of the gangster leader of "Tu Long Bang" (土龍幫).

Rich, powerful, self-centered, and his concerns are his looks.

Like Da Dong, he has a 3rd position on the KO Rank, his battle level being 9,000. Because he and Da Dong shared the third position, he joined Zhong Ji Yi Ban intending to challenge him. They later became best buddies.

His primary weapon is the Shi Zhong Jian (石中劍 / Sword in the Stone), a spiritual dagger created by the wizard Merlin and used by King Arthur. When he removes the stone from the dagger, the sword essence will possess Ya Se, allowing him to instantly gain evil powers at the expense of losing control over his own actions.

Ding Xiao Yu (丁小雨)

Xiao Yu is an exchange student from "Tuo Nan High School" (拓南高中), known as the 4th ranked fighter on the KO Rank, his fighting count being 8,500. He is prone to giving others cold looks if they are not willing to leave him alone.

He doesn't like violence. He is known to be great at withstanding constant beating, and he will not fight back. However, if anyone hits his head, he will definitely fight back.

He uses his powerful fists as weapons and has the battle level of 8500. Xiao Yu's left fist is said to have the power of an atomic bomb, while his right fist has ten times the power of his left fist. However, if he uses the right hand, he will become unable to use more power within three hours and might risk losing his own life.

Huang An Qi (黃安琪)

An Qi is daughter of a famous politician and Da Dong's and Lei Ke Si's childhood best friend. She has been in love with Da Dong for a really long time, but never truly knew how he felt. She never knew Lei Ke Si was in love with her. She moved to America five years ago, but during that time she has written over five hundred letters to Da Dong - two letters per week. She never got any response from Da Dong, but he has secretly been collecting and memorizing them.

Her love for Da Dong is the reason why Lei Ke Si hates Da Dong. When Lei Ke Si finally reveals his identity as KO. 2 and gets Da Dong into a hospital, she decides to return to America because she believes she caused the rivalry between him and his best friend. Before she leaves, Da Dong tells her that he has been secretly memorizing her letters, so she stayed in Taiwan.

Tian Xin (田欣)

The homeroom teacher of Zhong Ji Yi Ban (終極一班). Because of her little brother's past, she becomes a teacher, in hopes to getting bad students back on the right track.

As a person, she is very nice and likes to babble a lot when she gets angry.

At first, Da Dong did not like her at all because of her position as a teacher but was eventually touched by her kindness and decided to let her become their homeroom teacher.

Sha Jie (煞姊)

Number 13th on the KO Rank.

Sha Jie is the leader of the girl gang of the class. She is extremely mean and fierce.

She has been in love with Da Dong since before the start of the series, but he hasn't shown any signs of liking her back.

Lei Ke Si (雷克斯)

Da Dong's childhood friend whom Da Dong has absolute trust in. Lei Ke Si has liked An Qi since they were kids, but because she was in love with Da Dong, he developed a strong hatred for his best friend.

In school, he is known as Da Dong's brain.

Because of his disguise as a weak kid with good intentions, nobody knows Lei Ke Si is actually KO. 2 - the next strongest fighter on the KO Rank, with a battle level of 10,000.

His weapon is "Ah Rui Xi Zhi Shou" (阿瑞斯之手 / Ares' Hand), a metal glove reclaimed from the realm of darkness.

== KO Rank ==
KO Rank	Name	Gender	Nickname	Fighting Count	Special Skill/Weapon
1	Tian Hong Guang (田弘光)	Male	None (無名)	30,000	Dragon Blade (龍斬)
2	Lei Ke Si (雷克斯)	Male	Zhan Shen/War God (戰神)	10,000	Ares' Hand (阿瑞斯之手)
3	Wang Da Dong (汪大東)	Male	Da Dong (大東 / 自大狂)	9,000	Dragon Tattooed Pan (龍紋鏊)
3	Wang Ya Se (王亞瑟)	Male	Ya Se Wang/Mr. Narcissist (亞瑟王 / 自恋狂)	9,000	Sword in the Stone (石中劍)
4	Ding Xiao Yu (丁小雨)	Male	Nai Da Wang (耐打王	8,500	Powerful Left Fist (黃金左拳) or Ultimate Right Fist(致命右拳) / Ares' Hand (阿瑞斯之手) borrowed from Lei Ke Si (雷克斯)
5	Tong Da You (童大友)	Male	Tai Shan (泰山)	8,000	-
7	Cai Yun Han (蔡雲寒)	Female	Jin Gang Jie Jie/Iron Sister (金剛姊姊)	7,800	Pain Kills Desire To Live Truth Telling Whip (痛不欲生實話鞭)
9	Shi Huo (史火)	Male	Huo Long/Fire Dragon(火龍)	7,300	Dragon Shield (龙盾)
11	Da Li Jun (大力俊)	Male	-	-	Super-Strength (大力)
13	Sha Jie (煞姊)	Female	Zhong Ji Ban Hua (終極班花)	4,000	-
14	Tao Zi (桃子)	Female	-	-	-
15	Bai Linda (白琳達)	Female	-	-	-
19	Zhong Quan (忠犬)	Male	Tian Shi Zhong Quan (天使忠犬)	-	-
21	Tian Cai Xiao Diao Shou (添財小釣手)	Female	-	-	-
22	Bing Qi Lin (冰畸淋)	Female	-	-	-
23	Na Lu Wan Zai (那瀘灣仔)	Male	-	-	-
24	Xuan Wo Ming Ren (炫窩名人)	Male	-	-	-
25	Bing Qi Bu (冰畸怖)	Female	-	-	-
26	Kua Ke Xiong Di (夸克兄弟)	Male(s)	-	-	-
27	Guai Yi Bo Shi (怪衣博士)	Male	-	-	-
28	Zang San Feng (髒三瘋)	Male	-	-	-
135	Jin Bao San (金寶三)	Male	Nei Shang Wang (內傷王)	-	Pi Ren Jiu zhan (屁人九斬)
150	The only elementary student (唯一國小生)	Male	-	-	

== Groups ==
Zhong Ji Yi Ban (終極一班)

Also known as "The Ultimate Class." The class is filled with misfits who were either thrown out or not accepted by any other high school. The drama mostly consists of events that occur around the members of this class. The classmates are known for being very troublesome, but also very loyal to their leader; Wang Da Dong (汪大東).

Members:
Wang Da Dong (汪大東) - leader
Wang Ya Se (王亞瑟)
Ding Xiao Yu (丁小雨)
Jin Bao San (金寶三) - monitor
Ji An (技安)
Sha Yu (鯊魚)
Xiao La (小辣)
Cai Wu Xiong (蔡五熊)
Cai Yun Han (蔡雲寒)
Xia Ba (下巴)
Liang Zhi (兩指).
Former members:
Lei Ke Si (雷克斯)
Huang An Qi (黃安琪)
Sha Jie (煞姊)
Tao Zi (桃子)
Bai Linda (白琳達)
Fu Tou (斧頭)
Zhu Pi (豬皮).

Tu Long Bang (土龍幫)

A gang controlled by Ya Se's father, Wang Tu Long (王土龍). He started this gang after he left Wu Li Cai Jue Suo (武力裁决所). He built it in hopes to be able to protect himself and his son from Hei Long.

Members:
Wang Ya Se (王亞瑟)
Wang Tu Long (王土龍) - leader

Wu Li Cai Jue Suo (武力裁决所)

An organization created by 7 people 3 decades ago. As time passed, several events happened, most of the members died or left the gang. With everyone gone, Hei Long becomes the leader and sets out to find and capture powerful people to either make them his minions or destroy them. In the end, this organization is destroyed when Hei Long loses his powers.

Members:
Hei Long (黑龍) - leader
Tian Hong Guang/Wu Shi Zun (田弘光 / 武屍尊)
Wu Shi Wu (武屍無)
Lei Ke Si/Wu Shi Duo (雷克斯 / 武屍奪)
Wu Shi Du (武屍毒)
Wu Shi An (武屍暗)
Wu Shi Hui (武屍毀)
Former members:
Wang Tu Long (王土龍)
Duan Chang Ren (斷腸人)
Xiao Yu's father

Dong Cheng Wei (東城衛)

An underground music band that can use music to improve a person's power. Da Dong often goes to them to sing and improve his power along with Ya Se and Xiao Yu.

Members:
Xiu (脩) - leader
Deng (鐙)
Ming (冥)
Qiu (萩)
Wang Da Dong (汪大東) - part-time member

== Cast ==
=== Main cast ===
- Jiro Wang (汪東城) as Wang Da Dong (汪大東)
- Calvin Chen (陳奕儒) as Wang Ya Se (王亞瑟)
- Aaron Yan (炎亞綸) as Ding Xiao Yu (丁小雨)
- Stephanie Lee (李妹研) as Huang An Qi (黃安琪)
- Melody (殷悦) as Tian Xin (田欣)
- Sunnie Huang (黄小柔) as Sha Jie (煞姊)
- Danson Tang (唐禹哲) as Lei Ke Si (雷克斯)

=== Extended cast ===
- Zhang Hao Ming (張皓明) as Jin Bao San (金寶三)
- Na Wei Xun (那維勲) as Duan Chang Ren (斷腸人) / Hei Long (黑龍)
- Chen De Xiu / Xiu (陳德修 / 脩) as Dong Cheng Wei-Xiu (東城衛 - 脩)
- Li Ming Han (李明翰) as Dong Cheng Wei - Ming (東城衛 - 冥)
- Deng Hua Dun (鄧樺敦) as Dong Cheng Wei - Deng (東城衛 - 鐙)
- Qiu Yi Hong (邱議弘) as Dong Cheng Wei-Qiu (東城衛-萩)
- Xie He Xian / a Chord (謝和弦) as Sha Yu (鯊魚)
- Tsai Han-tsen / Han (蔡函岑 / 寒) as Cai Yun Han (蔡雲寒)
- Cai Yi Zhen / Wu Xiong (蔡宜臻 / 五熊) as Cai Wu Xiong (蔡五熊)
- Jian Han Zong (簡漢宗) as Su Bu Qi (蘇布啓) [Drillmaster]
- Ye Hui Zhi (葉蕙芝) as Gu Wen Jing (古文靜) [Chinese Teacher]
- Xia Jing Ting (夏靖庭) as Jia Yong (賈勇) [School Dean]
- Ba Ge (巴戈) as Qian Lai Ye (錢萊冶) [Principal]
- Wang Qian Cheng (王巧琤) as Liang Zhi (兩指)
- Li Yi Hua (李衣驊) as Xia Ba (下巴)
- Chen Zhen Wei (陳振偉) as Fu Tou (斧頭)
- Xu Zhi Yan (許智彥) as Zhu Pi (豬皮)
- Ke Tian Bei (柯天貝) as Bai Linda (白琳達)
- Wang Huai Xuan (王懷萱) as Tao Zi (桃子)
- Lu Jian Yu (陸建宇) as Xiao La (小辣)
- Andy Gong (龔繼安) as Ji An (技安)
- Huang Wan Bo (黃萬伯) as Dao Ba Jie Sen (刀疤傑森)
- Ah Jiao (阿嬌) as Ceng Mei Hao (曾美好)
- Chen Bor-jeng (陳博正) as Wang Tian Yang (汪天養)
- Wu Chun (吳尊) as Tian Hong Guang (田弘光) / Wu Shi - Chun (武屍-尊)
- Li Jie Sheng (李傑聖) as Teacher Yu Sheng De (于聖德老师)
- Danny Dun (鄧安寧) as Wan Bo (萬伯)
- Figaro Tseng (曾少宗) as Ceng Shao Zong (曾少宗)
- Alien Huang / Xiao Gui (黃鴻升 / 小鬼) as Cai Yi Ling (蔡一0)
- Cai Ming Xun (蔡明勳) as Da Li Jun (大力俊)
- Liu Er Jin (劉爾金) as Doctor
- Yang Chieh-mei as Bai Mu Dan (白牡丹)
- Chien Te-men (乾德門) as Weapon Store Manager
- Darren (何政辉) as Shi Huo (史火)
- Li Bing Yi (李秉億) as Doctor
- Zhang Bo Han (章柏翰) as Nurse
- Zhang Yi Jie (張義傑) as Wu Shi - An (武屍-暗)
- Fang Bo Hua (方柏華) as Wu Shi - Hue (武屍-毀)
- Chen Xiao Fu (陳孝輔) as Wu Shi - Du (武屍-毒)
- Li Luo (李羅) as Wang Tu Long (王土龍)

== Production credits and trivia ==
- Producer: Chen Zi Han (陳芷涵) / Wang Xin Gue (王信貴) / Liu Xing (劉行)
- Director: Liao Fei Hong (廫猆鴻)
- Screenwriter: Qi Xi Lin (齊鍚麟) / Lan Jin Xiang (藍今翔)
- Da Dong has the best potential to be KO.1 among all the KO fighters.
- It is rumored that the descendant of Guo Jing is the legendary KO.1 Tian Hong Guang and his sister Tian Xin.
- The director had a hard time choreographing the moves with the actors.
- The director intended to incorporate a KO.9 into the last few episodes, but due to their schedule, KO. 9 was credited as guest star instead.
