= Taiwanese drama =

Genre of television

Taiwanese drama (Chinese: 台灣影集; pinyin: Táiwān Diànshìjù, also known as T.W. drama) refer to dramatic programming of television programming extended stories usually dramatizing relationships through the general range of ten to forty one-hour episodes. They are produced in Taiwan and have gained increasing popularity in the Mandarin-speaking community internationally. The term "Taiwanese drama" is applied to Taiwanese miniseries in general, even including those with greater elements of comedy than of drama.

== Origins and range of popularity ==
During the rapid development of the Four Asian Tigers, the success of the Hong Kong entertainment industry and its TV drama programming served as a major influence for television and entertainment programming in the other rapidly-industrializing Asian nations, most notably Taiwan and South Korea.

Many of these dramas have become popular throughout East Asia and Southeast Asia. Most popular Taiwanese dramas are also popular in Mainland China, Vietnam, Hong Kong and Macau, Japan, Thailand, Singapore, Malaysia, Indonesia and Philippines.

Taiwanese dramas are also well known among expatriate/overseas Asian people. Fan clubs have appeared in other countries outside Taiwan dedicated to the appreciation of Taiwanese drama. Fan clubs also involved several countries in neighbouring Asian nations and elsewhere.

== Language ==
Taiwanese dramas are typically produced in Mandarin. Less commonly, they may be produced in Taiwanese Hokkien. Commonly characters will speak predominantly in Mandarin, but pepper their speech with Taiwanese. Sometimes characters, usually those playing the parts of parents or relatives coming from more rural and poorer areas, will speak in Taiwanese-accented Mandarin.

== Subject matter ==
Taiwanese dramas typically focus more on romance than other television dramas. Crime dramas, police dramas, lawyer dramas, and doctor dramas are less common in Taiwan than romantic dramas. Taiwanese dramas tend to have less violence and sexual content than many other soap operas and primetime dramas.

Popular Taiwanese dramas generally divided into “idol dramas" (偶像劇) and Taiwanese Minnan dramas (台語劇). "Idol dramas" use the most popular singers and actors or actresses in the Taiwanese entertainment industry, most of whom are in their late teens or 20s, regardless of actual acting experience. The idol dramas cater primarily to the teen or 20s age group. The phenomenon started with 2001's Meteor Garden.

Typical subjects can include first teenage experiences with dating. Characters often have some dark secret or painful past that makes it difficult for them to form lasting relationships, and the drama may show characters finding a way to work through their deep personal problems. Love triangles are a common feature.

Taiwanese idol dramas share many similarities in genre with both Japanese dramas and Korean dramas, although they differ considerably in subject matter with Chinese dramas. For example, dramas based on nationalist sentiment and politics are much less common. Mainland Chinese dramas also use far more actors and actresses of varying ages. In contrast, the male and female leads and supporting actors in "idol dramas" are all exclusively in their late teens or 20s.

Many popular Taiwanese dramas are based on Japanese manga, using shōjo manga in particular although some seinen manga have been made into dramas as well. Some examples include Meteor Garden (based on Hana Yori Dango), It Started with a Kiss (based on Itazura na Kiss), Marmalade Boy, Peach Girl, and Love Buffet. In these adaptations, the characters' names are read as Chinese or are changed to more Chinese-sounding names, and of course, the setting is moved to Taiwan.

Furthermore, the popularity of Hong Kong dramas has resulted in the launch of a TVB affiliate network in the country, TVBS, with the network's entertainment channel sometimes producing local adaptations of popular Hong Kong dramatic programs.

Most Taiwanese speak Mandarin but the second common languages are Hakka and Taiwanese Hokkien.

== Actors and actresses ==
It is common for the actors and actresses in Taiwanese dramas, especially "idol dramas", to also be pop singers and rock musicians.

Some notably popular Taiwanese drama actors include Aaron Yan, Marcus Chang, Lego Lee, Vanness Wu, George Hu, Roy Chiu, Mike He, Chris Wu, Wu Chun, Lan Cheng Lung, Jiro Wang, Jasper Liu, Weber Yang, and Megan Lai.

== See also ==
- Taiwanese Wave
- Television in Taiwan
- List of Chinese-language television channels
- Cinema of Taiwan
- Taiwanese television actors
- Taiwanese television actresses
- Korean drama
- Thai television soap opera
- Japanese television drama
- Chinese television drama
- Hong Kong television drama
