= List of The X-Family characters =

This is a character list of the Taiwanese television series The X-Family, which aired between August 8 and October 23, 2007.

== The Xia Lan Xing De Family (夏蘭荇德 家族) ==
=== Xia Xiong (夏雄) ===
Full name: Xia Lan Xing De Xiong (夏蘭荇德‧雄).
Blood status: Pure-blood.
Age: 43 years old.
Aura: Red.
Position in the family: Mother of Xia Yu (夏宇), Xia Tian (夏天), and Xia Mei (夏美).
Status: Alive.
Fighting Points 11500+.
Actress: Pauline Lan (藍心湄).

Biography:
As the sole bread winner in the family and owner of a truck company, she takes on the roles that traditionally belong to fathers and sons.

- Wanting a normal life:

Despite her tough exterior, she desires the closeness and comfort of a normal family life.

She wants her children to lead normal lives, so she sealed Xia Tian and Xia Mei's powers with a pair of "Feng Long Tie" (封龍貼 / Seal Dragon Patch) since they were young. Of all her children, she worries about Xia Tian the most. His closeness with his father upsets her because she does not want her son to follow his father's footsteps in becoming a musician. But he eventually convinces her to let him pursue his dream when he sings her favourite song while kneeling outside their house to beg for her permission.

- Hobbies:

She loves to cook, but most people are repulsed by her cooking because she makes the worst food and would do anything to avoid eating it. The only people who enjoy her cooking are Demon Hunter, Jiu Wu and herself, which explains why she doesn't stop making food even though everybody else protests.

- Love life:

She divorced Ye Si Ren because he was irresponsible as a father and unfaithful as a husband. But though her marriage fell apart years ago, she still loves Ye Si Ren and desires his company. When Ye Si Ren reveals his identity as a member of the evil Ye He Na La Family, she finally expresses her true feelings and the two of them become closer than before. But obstacles don't stop coming in-between them from there; First, they learn that Han (Xia Tian's girlfriend) is Ye Si Ren's long lost daughter, thus ruins their plan to reconcile their marriage. Secondly, Ye Si Ren's father uses her ex-husband and her son Xia Tian as pawns to take over the world and she is forced to fight back the constant obstacles coming for them. And finally, Xia Xiong gets trapped in "Shi Kong Jia Feng" (時空夾縫 / separate-dimensional wall) and her loved ones almost forgot about her in the process. But after going through these obstacles, the two finally end up together.

Nicknames:
Because of her manly personality, people usually refer to her as "Xiong Ge" (雄哥 / Big Brother Xiong). People including her father Xia Liu, her ex-husband Ye Si Ren, and her eldest son Xia Yu.

Aside from her average nickname, she also has three other nicknames; Xia Mei calls her "Lao Mu Da Ling" (老母達令 / Mummy Darling), and Xia Tian calls her "Lao Ma" (老媽 / Mom) and finally Lan Ling Wang calls her "Fu Ren" (夫人 - Madam), a title she is highly amused of.

Specialty:
In the initial episodes, she wears a metal glove called "Qilin Shou" (麒麟手 / Qilin Glove) to cast a family spell called "Qi Lin Mai Chong Guang Tao Can" (麒麟脈衝光套餐).

Later, she uses a gun named "Wu Feng" (烏風 / Zaocys), which was given to her by the God of Guns years ago. It is powerful enough to kill any evil entity and to temporarily transfer the combined power of 99 spirits trapped in the gun to a person who is completely pure in heart and mind with the help of the Great Traveler. While the God of Guns can access the gun's full potential, she can only access 30 percent of its powers.

=== Xia Tian (夏天) / Gui Long (鬼龍) ===
Full name: Xia Lan Xing De Tian (夏蘭荇德‧天).
Blood status: Half-blood (Pure & Dark).
Age: 17 years old.
Aura: Green/Gold (Ultimate Iron Man).
Position in the family: The middle child of the three siblings.
Status: Deceased (presumably).
Fighting Points: 13000 (16000+ as Gui Long), (50000+ as Ultimate Iron Man).
Actor: Jiro Wang (汪東城) - Fahrenheit (飛輪海) / Dong Cheng Wei (東城衛).

Biography:
Xia Tian (Summer in translation) is a sweet kid with a good heart, but he often gets taken advantage of due to his naivety. Though he is born with powerful abilities, he dislikes using them.

- Dreams:

He dreams to follow his father's footsteps and become a musician, an idea his mother strongly opposes to initially. But he convinces her to allow him to follow his dream, and then becomes the lead singer of Dong Cheng Wei (東城衛).

- Destined for greatness:

Since he made little effort in controlling his powerful but unstable abilities, a "Feng Long Tie" (封龍貼) was placed on his neck making him no different from a "Ma Gua" (麻瓜 / Muggle). Xiu believes Xia Tian has the potential to become a "Zhong Ji Tie Ke Ren" (終極鐵克人/ Ultimate Iron Man), a savior of worlds, so he taught Xia Tian to play guitar and control Gui Long (鬼龍 / Ghostly Dragon) - his evil half with greater power, who on several occasions, attempts to destroy Xia Tian in order to become the dominant personality. But although they are enemies, they have once come together to fight against Zack, their evil counterpart from the Bronze Dimension. Despite Xia Tian's inability to control Gui Long, his mother made him the guardian of the Xia family heirloom, the "Feng Long Ka" (封龍卡 / Seal Dragon Card), a mini disk containing everything about "power-users" (異能行者). In order for Xia Tian to become Zhong Ji Tie Ke Ren, he must find the five original power-users of wind, fire, thunder, lightning and rain (原位異能行者) and collect their elements. In the end, he succeeds in collecting the five elemental powers and becomes the legendary Zhong Ji Tie Ke Ren.

- Love life:

His biggest motivation for developing his power and guitar skills is Han, a girl he met when he was a child and has liked ever since. To save her life, he rushed into "Mie" (滅 / destruction) to rescue her trapped soul and was willing to trade his soul for hers. When they both safely returned to the human world, their love blossomed, but not without trials. First, his father told him Han was his half-sister. They were forced to separate and treat each other with indifference. Then, he found out Han was part his paternal grandfather's conspiracy to dominate the world. But the good news is that he and Han are not related and the two finally get a happy ending.

Nicknames:
Xia Mei calls him "Xiao Ge" (小哥 / Little Big Brother).

Ren Chen Wen sometimes calls him "Tian Ge" (天哥 / Big Brother Tian) along with Xia Mi and Wa Ge, however, he is more common to call him "Wo De Tian Ge" (我的天哥 / My Big Brother Tian).

His evil half Gui Long sometimes calls him "Xiao Tian Tian" (小天天 / Little Tian) to mock him.

Specialty:

- As Gui Long:

When he takes off the Feng Long Tie, he transforms into Gui Long and becomes unable to control his actions. But thanks to Xiu, he learns a spell to help him control Gui Long. Eventually he becomes strong enough to suppress him without using the Feng Long Tie. Gui Long's main weapon is the guitar pick "Gui Long Pi Ke" (鬼龍鎞克 / Gui Long Guitar Pick) as his weapon, into which the Feng Long Ka is embedded. His notable, yet lowest ability is to impregnate people through a simple kiss (this implies boys as well). Those who fall victim will become pregnant, smile crazily and be flirtatious for three days before the effect wears off.

Gui Long disappears when the Master, his paternal grandfather, executes his plan to dominate the world, causing half of his powers to disappear along with Gui Long. Gui Long's disappearance makes Xia Tian the dominant personality.

- As Zhong Ji Tie Ke Ren:

When Xia Tian finally becomes Zhong Ji Tie Ke Ren, he becomes able to cast all kinds of spells that were previously used and can use the legendary guitar "Tie Ke Wu Ji" (鐵克無極 / Iron Limitless) as his primary weapon and also uses the Feng Long Ka as his guitar pick.

Alternate counterparts:
Xia Tian / Gui Long has three alternate counterparts introduced throughout the Zhong Ji series:

In the Gold Dimension: Wang Da Dong the leader of Zhong Ji Yi Ban (終極一班) from the first series KO One (終極一班).
In the Bronze Dimension: Zack a well-known psycho killer sent to the Iron Dimension in attempt to make Xia Tian stronger from the second series The X-Family (终极一家).
In the Silver Dimension: Sun Ce the student-body president of Jiangdong High School (江東高校) and Sun Shang Xiang's older brother from the third series K.O.3an Guo (終極三國).

Xia Tian and Da Dong share a similar ability in being able to vary the level of their own powers to their opponent's. It is no doubt that Zack might share this same ability as well.

=== Xia Yu (夏宇) / Gui Feng (鬼鳳) ===
Full name: Xia Lan Xing De Yu (夏蘭荇德‧宇).
Blood status: Half-blood.
Age: 20 years old.
Aura: Light yellow.
Position in the family: The eldest of the three siblings.
Status: Alive.
Fighting Points11000 (18000+ as Gui Feng)
Actor: Danson Tang (唐禹哲).

Biography:
Xia Yu (sounds like "raining" (下雨) in some ways) rarely worries his mother. As a student majoring in law and finance at National Taiwan University, he is great with money and handles the family budget, and is also a money-lover. He always cooks and takes care of his younger siblings during his mother's absence.

- Secret wishes:

Despite being the person everyone trusts and relies on, he resents being the only "Ma Gua" (麻瓜) in the family and doing the menial jobs around the home. His resentment grows when he finds out that his mother had given the "Feng Long Ka" (封龍卡) to Xia Tian instead of him, the eldest son, because of his Ma Gua status. Evil sees his jealousy and uses that to turn him evil by giving him a ring to absorb other people's powers. The ring unwittingly unlocks Xia Yu's sealed power. As it turns out, he is not a Ma Gua by birth. Rather, his father secretly sealed his power upon birth because he exhibited the pure evil genes. When he fully comes into his powers, his dark instincts start to take over. The situation forces his father to use "Xi Hun Qu" (洗魂曲 / Soul Cleansing Melody) to cleanse his soul and seal his power again.

- Coming into his power:

Xia Yu's powers remain sealed until his paternal grandfather's plan to take over the world backfires causing a beam of dark energy to strike directly at him, turning him into "Gui Feng" (鬼鳳 / Ghostly Phoenix), who is the "original power-user of fire" (火的原位異能行者). Gui Feng is so powerful that not even a "Feng Long Tie" (封龍貼) can suppress him completely. But since his element is needed to help Xia Tian become "Zhong Ji Tie Ke Ren" (終極鐵克人), they cannot strip his powers away. His family eventually finds a way to contain Gui Feng by using "Bing Gu Zhou" (冰箍咒) to cool his fire, which gives Xia Yu the time that he needs to learn how to control Gui Feng.

Although Gui Feng is more powerful than Gui Long, he appears to be not as arrogant as he was and sometimes shows a caring side though he tries to hide it.

Because demonized power-users can convert other people's powers into their own, there is a possibility that Gui Feng is actually the reincarnation of Gui Long, since both have similar personalities. Plus there is a fact that whoever falls victim to the Soul Cleansing Melody will receive a different type of supernatural abilities if he ever regains powers.

- Love life:

Although Xia Yu does not have any real love interest in the story, he has once fallen for the Fire Ant Girl, a demonic assassin that his paternal grandfather sent to attack his family and got caught by his maternal grandfather. He learns the ant-language so as to communicate with her and to interpret for the others and he truly cared for her. However, their relationship breaks after she is killed by Xia Tian's evil counterpart, Zack.

Nicknames:
Xia Mei often calls Xia Yu "Shi Li Gui" (勢利鬼 - meaning something similar to Snob) as well as "Si Ma Gua" (死麻瓜 - meaning "Stupid Muggle" but directly translated to "Dead Muggle").

Xia Tian calls him "Lao Ge" (老哥 / Big Brother).

Ren Chen Wen, Xia Mi and Wa Ge call him "Yu Ge" (宇哥 / Big Brother Yu).

Ye Si Ren and Gui Long have at some point called him "Xiao Yu" (小宇 / Little Yu), a name that is similar with Jiu Wu's counterpart, Xiao Yu (小雨).

Specialty:
As the original power-user of fire, Xia Yu/Gui Feng can manipulate heat.

Aside from Gui Feng's existence, Xia Yu can easily absorb outside energy like other demonized power-users (魔化異能行者) even without powers, and can also understand certain demonic languages, thanks to the genes he inherited from his dad.

Alternate counterpart:
Xia Yu has one alternate counterpart introduced throughout the Zhong Ji series:

In the Gold Dimension: Lei Ke Si (雷克斯) from the first series KO One (終極一班). Lei Ke Si is Wang Da Dong's childhood friend. Both Xia Yu and Lei Ke Si are good at their studies and have revealed evil tendencies at some point. Although Lei Ke Si did not appear in the storyline, he did appear in the introduction theme, a flashback of his battle against his enemy and as an image of KO 2 on the Top Ten KO News.

=== Xia Mei (夏美) / Gui Wa (鬼娃) ===
Full name: Xia Lan Xing De Mei (夏蘭荇德‧美).
Blood status: Half-blood.
Age: 16 or 17 years old.
Aura: Deep blue.
Position in the family: The youngest and only daughter in the family.
Status: Alive.
Fighting Points:7000.
Actress: Sunnie Huang (黃小柔).

Biography:
Despite being born in a powerful magic family, Xia Mei is the only base-leveled power-user, which makes her the least powerful member in the family. Nevertheless, she is strongest among lower-level power-users. Like her mother, she has anger issues, and is very persistent; pretty much the only kuso in the home. Between her two brothers, Xia Tian is the one she likes the most because he is often understanding while Xia Yu only cares for money and benefits, which makes her want to tease him every now and then.

- Love life:

Initially, she has a crush on Xiu, the guitarist in the band Dong Cheng Wei (東城衛), but later falls for Lan Ling Wang. She is so obsessed with Lan Ling Wang that she is willing to sacrifice anything for him. However, when she realizes how much Lan Ling Wang truly loves his fiancée Bing Xin, she decides to give them her full support. Including arranging a wedding for them and giving Bing Xin the wedding dress her mother kept for her own wedding. In the end, she still loves the guy, but they remain friends.

Nicknames:
She is called "Mei Mei Jie" (美美姊 / Big Sister Mei Mei) by Ren Chen Wen (任晨文).

Xia Tian calls her "Lao Mei" (老妹 / Little Sister).

Xia Yu calls her "Hua Chi Mei" (花痴美 / referring to a girl who gets obsessed with every cute guy she sees).

Her father sometimes calls her "Mei Mei" (美美 - 美 meaning beautiful) or "Mei Mei" (妹妹 - meaning little sister).

Her mother calls her "Tong Xue" (同學 / Classmate) when she does or says something inappropriate.

Specialty:
By ripping off her Feng Long Tie (封龍貼) partially, Xia Mei becomes able to use her power of electricity to attack people; Ren Chen Wen often falls victim to her power of electricity. However, since her powers belong to basic level, she cannot do any serious damage.

When she rips off her Feng Long Tie completely, she becomes Gui Wa (鬼娃 / Ghostly Doll), and becomes able to scare people with Zhen Zi (貞子 - a demon from the movie The Ring), a ghost-like demon with pale skin and a green glow, which she conjures with a little puppet that appears along when she transforms.

Unlike her brothers, her consciousness remains in her evil form, making her the only sibling that doesn't have much problem controlling her evil half. But when she becomes Gui Wa, her instincts to scare people become overwhelming.

Alternate counterpart:
Xia Mei has one alternate counterpart introduced throughout the Zhong Ji series:

In the Gold Dimension: Sha Jie from the first series KO One (終極一班). Both Xia Mei and Sha Jie are instinctive, they act very petty and hostile against those they hate and are passionate or rather obsessive towards those they love. However, Sha Jie is more devoted. Sha Jie does not appear in the storyline, but she does appear in the introduction theme alongside Lei Ke Si Xia Yu's alternate counterpart.

=== Xia Liu (夏流) ===
Full name: Xia Lan Xing De Liu (夏蘭荇德‧流).
Blood status: Pure-blood.
Age: 70 years old.
Aura: Lavender.
Position in the family: The playful grandfather of Xia Tian (夏天), Xia Yu (夏宇) and Xia Mei (夏美); and the head of the family.
Status: Alive.
Fighting Points:18000.
Actor: Chen Bo Zheng / Ah Xi (陳博正 / 阿西).

Biography:
Xia Liu (because his name sounds like "pervert" (下流), his name is often dragged into that theme) literally sleeps under the house as the entrance to his bedroom is located under the living room table. Xia Liu is the guardian of the entrance to the ghostly dimension, Mie (滅). He may be senile, but he is also the most powerful member in the family: that is before Xia Tian becomes the superior member. His lack of memories is sometimes part of what made the show interesting. This old man may be stubborn, but is also kind-hearted. And farts when something upsets him.

- Hobbies:

During free-time, he likes to hang out with his friends, Jiu Lai and Demon Hunter, on a mountain where they can be alone and discuss things. Pizza and bubble tea are two of his favourite meals. Xia Liu is excellent at sewing when he is motivated.

- Hatred towards Ye Si Ren and Lan Ling Wang:

He despises Ye Si Ren even before he married his daughter, and his dislike towards him grows when he finds out that he is a member of the Ye He Na La family, but learns to accept him over time, though he keeps accusing Ye Si Ren for things that he has not done. He doesn't like Lan Ling Wang at first either, but after he sacrifices himself to save their world, he starts to change his mind. Xia Liu has given each of them a golden watch, claiming that he only has one and that "it" can only be given to someone heroic and worthy, when the truth is that he has a whole collection of golden watches in his bedroom.

Nicknames:
Everyone knows him as "Ah Gong" (阿公 / Maternal Grandpa). Jiu Wu called him "Xia Liu Qian Bei" (夏流前辈 / Senior Xia Liu) before joining the others.

Some people are more common to call him "Xia Liu Ah Gong" (夏流阿公 / Grandpa Xia Liu).

His daughter Xia Xiong calls him "Ba" (爸 / Dad) and Ye Si Ren calls him "Qian Ye Fu Da Ren" (前岳父大人 / Former Father-in-law).

Specialty:
Removing people's memories is one of Xia Liu's many abilities, and is the first one to be used on screen.

His main weapon is a pair of cymbals called "Ke Mo Ba" (剋魔鈸), which he uses to attack with sound waves and to cast spells. His most notable attacks are eight spells that are mainly used for fighting evils, called "Jiang Mo Ba Jue" (降魔八訣). Other than Ke Mo Ba, he has been seen wielding a trumpet called "Long Wen Hao" (龍紋嚎) to enhance the effects of his freezing spell. He also has a staff called "Jiang Mo Jiang" (降魔降) specifically used for exorcism, however, the weapon was never shown.

Xia Liu is capable of summoning the family spirits to assist them at times.

He also knows a technique to astral project his soul into another's body called "Tai Xu Yun You Su" (太虛雲遊術).

Alternate counterparts:
Xia Liu has two alternate counterparts introduced throughout the Zhong Ji series:

In the Gold Dimension: Wang Tian Yang, formerly known as the powerful assassin “Dao Feng” (刀瘋) and is also the father of Wang Da Dong from the first series KO One (終極一班).
In the Silver Dimension: Dong Zhuo the villainous ruler and principal of Hedong Institute (河東學院) and later the principal of East Han Academy (東漢書院) from the third series K.O.3an Guo(終極三國). Xia Liu was mentioned when Guan Yu asked Xiu how he knew Dong Zhuo so well, which was when Xiu thought of Xia Liu.

=== Ye Si Ren (葉思仁) ===
Full name: Ye He Na La Si Ren (葉赫那啦‧思仁).
Blood status: Pure-blood.
Age: 46 years old.
Aura: White (assumably).
Position in the family: Ex-husband of Xia Xiong (夏雄), and father of Xia Tian (夏天), Xia Yu (夏宇) and Xia Mei (夏美).
Status: Alive.
Actor: Na Wei Xun (那維勲).

Biography:
Ye Si Ren (sounds close to "死人" / Dead Man) owns a pub called "The Ass Pub" (老屁股) and is a very gifted musician.

- Care for his family:

Because of his naïvety and unfaithfulness, he and Xia Xiong's marriage ended years ago, but he still has feelings for her as demonstrated by his interference with Xia Xiong's dates. Even though he was not a very good husband, he is a very good father, and will do anything in his capacity to protect his family.

- Revelation:

From the start, he appears as a Ma Gua (麻瓜) to everybody, but when Xia Yu's dark powers begin to manifest, he reveals himself as the head member of the Ye He Na La family (葉赫那啦家族) and plays the Xi Hun Qu (洗魂曲 / Soul Cleansing Melody) in order to cleanse Xia Yu's evil instincts and powers.

He is the one who sealed Xia Yu's powers when he was a baby, as well as giving the "Sou Hun Qu" (蒐魂曲 / Soul Collecting Melody) to a Chord to save Han.

- Love life:

According to himself, he met Xia Xiong when his family attacked hers twenty-three years ago, and fell in love with her at first sight. But because they were arch-enemies, he had to pretend to be a Ma Gua to be able to be with her. However, though he was deeply in love with Xia Xiong, his evil instincts always tried to make him drain her powers, so he relinquished his powers in order to be with her for real.

When things between him and Xia Xiong finally start to get back on track, he discovers that Han is his long-lost daughter, and has no choice but to split up Xia Tian and Han. Then, when things start to get back on track... again, his father comes into picture and ruins everything... again. But everything turns around in the end and he finally gets to live happily ever after with his family.

Nicknames:
Ye Si Ren has the nickname "Si Ren" (死人/Dead Man), a nickname that Xia Xiong and Xia Liu often use on him, and on occasions call him "Ye Si Ren" (葉死人).

He is also known as "Si Ren Tuan Zhang" (死人團張 / Dead Man Leader) to other people.

His children call him "Lao Ba" (老爸 / Dad).

Lan Ling Wang calls him by the title "Da Shao Ye" (大少爺 / Eldest Young Master).

Specialty:
Ye Si Ren possesses two of his family's most valuable objects: "Sou Hun Qu" (蒐魂曲 / Soul Collecting Melody) which has the power to revive people, and "Xi Hun Qu" (洗魂曲 / Soul Cleansing Melody) that has the power to cleanse a demonized power-user's powers and evil instincts.

Though he is not a power-user anymore, he still possesses certain abilities that Ma Gua and regular power-users don't have, such as the ability to see past events that occurred to someone else in the form of dreams, and to translate a demonic language that only Mo Hua Yi Neng Xing Zhe can understand.

Alternate counterparts:
Unlike the others, Ye Si Ren has two alternate counterparts in the Gold Dimension named Duan Chang Ren and Hei Long. They both gave up their abilities for respective reasons. He also has an alternative counterpart in the Silver Dimension named Sun Jian, father of Sun Ce, Sun Quan and Sun Shang Xiang. It was later discovered that Sun Jian is actually Ye's twin younger brother.

== Other Main Characters ==
=== Lan Ling Wang (蘭陵王) ===
Full name: Gu La Yi Er Lan Ling Wang (古拉依爾‧蘭陵王).
Blood status: Pure-blood.
Age: 19 years old.
Aura: Light blue.
Status: Alive.
Fighting Points:15000.
Actor: Calvin Chen (辰亦儒) - Fahrenheit (飛輪海).

Biography:
Lan Ling Wang was once a highly trained soldier and commander for the Ye He Na La family. His clothing is almost an exact duplicate to the Final Fantasy VII character, Cloud Strife. His lifestyle is pretty retro.

When Lan Ling Wang first appears in the story, he just appears and disappears around the Xia family and Dong Cheng Wei (東城衛), and was ordered to find "Sou Hun Qu" (蒐魂曲 / Soul Collecting Melody) and "Xi Hun Qu" (洗魂曲 / Soul Cleansing Melody).

- Painful times:

He challenges Xia Tian in a duel to reclaim the melodies, but then he hears from his dying minion that the young master has captured his family and destroyed his army. Ye Si Ren gives him the melodies in hopes that he would be able to use them as trade for his family. However, his attempt turns to a disappointment when he finds out that his family has already been eliminated. When he tries to claim revenge on the young master, he has his powers drained by a "Gui Ling Yan Huo Qiu" (鬼靈焰火球 / Ghostly Fireball) and becomes a Ma Gua (麻瓜) for a time throughout the series, until the Master of the Ye He Na La family executes his plan to dominate the world, and Lan Ling Wang learns a spell from his ancestor to ruin his plan, and as result displaces the Ye Ha Na La family's power and has his powers restored, as well as making Xia Yu come into his own power. However, the side effect is Xia Xiong getting trapped in "Shi Kong Jia Feng" (時空夾縫 / separate-dimensional wall).

- The Seven Stars Curse:

When Lan Ling Wang first lost his powers, he finds out that someone had put a "Qi Xin Zhou" (七星咒 / Seven Stars Curse) on his family six generations ago. And if he, the seventh generation, cannot lift the curse before the eighth generation is born, then the following generations will lose their true powers and become slaves of the Ye He Na La Family forever. But if he can lift it, he will gather up the energy of hatred that his ancestors have collected over the centuries and turn him into a "Zhong Ji Tie Ke Ren" (終極鐵克人 / Ultimate Iron Man). In the end, he only lifts half-the curse and becomes six times stronger than before. According to Jiu Wu, he also has the biggest chance of becoming Zhong Ji Tie Ke Ren than Xia Tian. But Lan Ling Wang himself is resistant to the idea, because the thought never occurred and add the fact that his family was killed because of supernatural abilities made him reluctant to using his powers.

- Love life:

Although he knows that Xia Mei is in love with him, he only loves one person; Bing Xin - Han's twin sister, who he thought was dead until Han senses her pain. With his friends' help, he finally finds her and gets to spend three days with her before she dies. Thanks to Xia Mei's help, they manage to get married and then say goodbye to each other in the morning.

Nicknames:
Xia Mei nicknames him "Xiao Lan Lan" (小蘭蘭 / Little Lan Lan).

Specialty:
Lan Ling Wang carries a sword from the spiritual realm known as "Lan Ling Zhan" (攔靈斬), and can use it to gather destructive energy and produce a powerful blast called "Fen Jian Da Fa" (弅劍大法), which can eliminate everything within 100 miles, including himself.

When Xia Mei accidentally strikes Lan Ling Wang with her electricity, he just stands there seemingly unharmed by it, and then they realize that he is the "original power-user of lightning" (電的原位異能行者), which explains why he is immune to electricity even as a Ma Gua.

Alternate counterpart:
Lan Ling Wang is the alternate counterpart of Wang Ya Se; both are as stubborn and courageous when it comes to saving their friends and families. They both carry swords that come with instruction manuals. However, he is not much of a narcissist like Ya Se.

=== Jiu Wu (灸舞) ===
Full name: Jiu Da Zhang Lao Wu (灸亣镸荖‧舞).
Blood status: Pure-blood.
Age: 17 years old.
Aura: Golden yellow.
Status: Alive.
Fighting Points:24000.
Actor: Aaron Yan (炎亞綸) - Fahrenheit (飛輪海).

Biography:
Jiu Wu (sounds like ninety-five) is the newly ascended ruler of the Iron Dimension. An organization called Tie Ke Jin Wei Jun (鐵克禁衛軍 / The Iron Imperial Army) is under his control to protect the Iron Dimension.

When he first appears, he has a deep, strange voice which makes him seem powerful and out of the ordinary. But after about twelve episodes, his powerful voice returned to a normal one.

He has a younger brother named Jiu Lai, who has the appearance of an old man due to his misuse of supernatural powers. Because he rarely reveals himself, people that know his brother assume that their appearances and ages would be alike; some even refer their names to be similar.

- Responsibilities as the ruler:

As the ruler, his main responsibility is to preserve "Fang Hu Ci Chang" (防護磁場 / Defense Magnetic Shield) that protects their world from outside attacks: if he gets hurt, the shield will weaken allowing evils to invade their world; but as he keeps on preserving the force field, it also weakens him in the process, making him unable to use his powers under certain circumstances.

- Love Life:

Once when Jiu Wu was kept in Ye Si Ren's titanium coffin, he developed some feelings for Han as a side effect. But once he stopped laying in the coffin, the feelings disappeared quickly.

- Hobbies:

Jiu Wu is a big-eater, and Xiong Ge's cooking is his favourite. Ever since he stopped by for the first time and tasted her food, he has been unable to get the taste out of his mouth.

- Finding Zhong Ji Tie Ke Ren:

From the start, Jiu Wu can already tell that both Lan Ling Wang and Xia Tian have the potential to become "Zhong Ji Tie Ke Ren" (終極鐵克人), although he believes that Lan Ling Wang's chance is bigger. He can also tell that Xia Yu is no ordinary Ma Gua upon meeting the first time, though he does not seem to know anything about him other than that.

Nicknames:
Jiu Wu is mostly called by the title "Meng Zhu" (盟主 / means something like master or ruler). Only the Master has called him by his name so far.

His master, the Great Traveler (神行者) calls him "Xiao Wu" (小舞 / Little Wu).

Specialty:
Jiu Wu has been famous since young for his "Jiu Bu Qin Gui Shou" (九步擒鬼手), which indicates the ability to find the opponent's Achilles' Heel within nine steps. No one has ever escaped this attack until he meets the father of the Ye He Na La Family. This ability was never seen on-screen, only mentioned.

He can also create force fields that prevent evil from entering, and separate part of his power for further use while still having the force field on.

After Han is found out to be the "original power-user of thunder", Jiu Wu reveals himself as the "original power-user of rain" (雨的原位異能行者). But because his energy is needed to support the force field that protects the Iron Dimension, he cannot transfer his element to Xia Tian or go to the Gold Dimension to restore the powers of his alternate counterpart, Ding Xiao Yu.

Alternate counterpart:
Jiu Wu has one alternate counterpart introduced throughout the Zhong Ji series:

In the Gold Dimension: Ding Xiao Yu one of the main protagonists from the first series KO One (終極一班).

Unlike his alternate counterpart Ding Xiao Yu, Jiu Wu is more playful, optimistic and likes to talk a lot and occasionally makes up cold jokes. Aside from looking alike, there appears to be nothing in common between the two.

Sequel:
In K.O.3an Guo (終極三國), Xiu mentioned that Jiu Wu had forbidden everyone from traveling to other dimensions ever since the balance of the worlds was restored.

=== Xiu (脩) ===
Full name: Hu Yan Jue Luo Xiu (呼延覺羅‧脩).
Blood status: Pure-blood.
Age: 20 years old.
Aura: Orange yellow.
Status: Alive.
Fighting Points:14000.
Actor: Shu Chen / Xiu (陳德修/脩) - Dong Cheng Wei (東城衛).

Biography:
Xiu is the leader and guitarist in the band, Dong Cheng Wei (東城衛).

- Teaching Xia Tian:

At first he thought that Xia Tian was just a Ma Gua (麻瓜), but when he sensed his special powers he started suspecting that Xia Tian might have the potential to become the legendary Zhong Ji Tie Ke Ren (終極鐵克人), so he becomes Xia Tian's guitar teacher and later trainer.

Because he is usually quiet and focused, it comes surprising to people that he has a playful side.

- Love life:

Xiu and Han had a tendency to fight each other the second they see each other due to a genetic hatred, but they manage to overcome that. He later secretly develops a soft spot for Han but does not allow himself to fall in love with her because of his duty. Whenever someone asks questions about his love life, he just replies "Dong Cheng Wei only plays music, and don't talk about love (東城衛只彈琴不談情)". Jiu Wu once asked why he didn't seize his chance to be with Han when she and Xia Tian were misunderstood as half-siblings, and he replied that he just hoped that they would have a happy ending now that there was nothing separating them anymore.

Nicknames:
Gui Long often calls him "Xiao Xiu Xiu" (小脩脩 - Little Xiu Xiu) as a way to mock him.

Specialty:
Xiu has the ability to force someone to act according to his commands, a spell that every member in his family is capable of.

He can also use a spell that allows him to talk fast and for the listeners to hear clearly.

His special weapon is a guitar pick called "Shen Feng Pi Ke" (神風鎞克 / God's Wind Guitar Pick), which has the power to increase its master's magical abilities and produce healing energy.

Xiu is the "original power-user of wind" (風的原位異能行者). He is the first to transfer his power to Xia Tian as well as telling him to find the other four original power-users.

Connection to KO One:
Aside from protecting the universe and teaching Xia Tian how to play the guitar as well as teaching him how to control his powers, he is also set on another mission: to find the Iron Dimension counterparts of Wang Da Dong, Wang Ya Se (王亞瑟) and Ding Xiao Yu, and use the counterparts to restore their powers so that they can turn the war between light and darkness in their favor.

Though Xiu did not have an alternate self in the Gold Dimension, he has played a minor role in the series of KO One (終極一班) where he played music with Da Dong. Only few people in other dimensions know of his band's existence. In The X-Family (終極一家), he is the key figure that connects the two dimensions.

Alternate counterpart:
Xiu has one alternate counterpart introduced throughout the Zhong Ji series:

In the Silver Dimension: Liu Bei from the third series K.O.3an Guo (終極三國). The eldest sworn brother to Guan Yu and Zhang Fei.

In K.O.3an Guo (終極三國), Xiu travels to the Silver Dimension with his friends and finds out that he has an alternate counterpart there, named Liu Bei. Because Wang Da Dong accidentally causes a giant rock to fall down on Liu Bei, Xiu is forced to take his role for the time being until the real Liu Bei recovers from his injuries.

=== Han (寒) ===
Full name: Han Ke La Ma Han (韓克拉瑪‧寒).
Blood status: Half-blood.
Age: 16 years old.
Aura: Aqua blue.
Status: Alive.
Fighting Points:11000.
Actress: Tsai Han-tsen.

Biography:
Han is the girl Xia Tian met and saved from a gang of naughty kids when she was young. She then gave him her hairpin as a gift, and the two became friends. After her mom died, she was abducted by evil power-users. Xia Tian has missed her since she disappeared, thinking that she moved away.

- Reunion with Xia Tian:

Years later, Han reappears when Xia Tian and his father are attacked by loan sharks and unwittingly rescues them (although she does hit Xia Tian on the head). The next night, Xia Tian and his friends go back to look for her and he recognizes her as soon as he sees the picture that he took with her and her mom on the same day he rescued her. However, she has completely forgotten about her friendship with Xia Tian along with everything else that happened before she was kidnapped. When Han finds out that he is the boy she met and that he has a crush on her, she tells him to leave her alone, because she would never fall for him. But after Xia Tian sacrifices himself to save her, her feelings begin to change and she takes back what she said.

- Evil control:

Unbeknownst to her, she is a "Shi Xin Sha Shou" (石心殺手 / Stone-Hearted Assassin), controlled by evil powers and has once been ordered to kill Xia Tian but gets defeated by Gui Long instead.

- A new beginning:

After Han failed her mission, she begins to turn into stone, but Xia Tian manages to save her with "Song Hun Qu" (蒐魂曲 / Soul Collecting Melody), but in the process, she completely loses her memories and becomes Xia Tian's girlfriend, acting only on the feelings she has for him since before she lost her memory. But when she finds out that she and Xia Tian are half-siblings, she moves out of his house and starts living and working at The Ass Pub (老屁股), which her father owns.

- Twins:

Lan Ling Wang has a fiancée named Bing Xin who looked exactly like her. As she starts receiving Bing Xin's visions of the past, she finds out that they are twins, and later also finds out that she and Xia Tian are not siblings but were fooled by other people, which allows them to finally get back together and live happily ever after.

- A complicated friendship with Xiu:

Han and Xiu's families carry a genetic hatred against each other, but they try very hard not to fight each other. Eventually, they overcome that hatred and the two families become friends again.

Nicknames:
In a flashback, Han's mother called her "Xiao Wen" (小妏 / Little Wen) in front of Ye Si Ren for some reason.

Specialty:
Han has the power to read one's mind and uses a pair of drumsticks known as "Jing Lei" (驚雷 / Frightening Thunder) as primary weapons, into which she has transferred her soul in order to make them both powerful and spiritual. Aside from fighting, she also uses the drumsticks for drumming. Before she lost her memory, all attacking spells she cast were thunder-based.

When Han sacrifices herself to save Xia Tian by taking a deadly hit into her own body and unwittingly transfers her thunder-energy to him, they realize that she is actually the "original power-user of thunder" (雷的原位異能行者).

Alternate counterpart:
Han has two alternate counterparts introduced throughout the Zhong Ji series:

In the Gold Dimension: Cai Yun Han the 7th ranked KO fighter from the first series KO One (終極一班), who is just as independent as she. They also share the same name "Han" (寒).
In the Silver Dimension: Da Qiao known as the most beautiful student in Jiangdong High School (江東高校) from the third series K.O.3an Guo (終極三國).

=== a Chord ===
Age: 20 years old.
Aura: (assumingly) White.
Status: Alive.
Fighting Points:11000.
Actor: a Chord / Xie He Xian (謝和弦).

Biography:
a Chord used to be the lead singer of the band Dong Cheng Wei (東城衛), which he continues to be until he is promoted to become the new leader of Bei Cheng Wei (北城衛) after the previous leader is killed by Zack and Xia Tian decides to join Dong Cheng Wei as the new lead vocalist. He is somewhat of a funny guy, who does not know the appropriate time to talk.

Although a Chord proves to be part of a supernatural army, he does not appear to manifest any special ability or weapon until Lan Ling Wang begins to sneak around his team and the Xia family.

- Dislike of Lan Ling Wang:

He does not like Lan Ling Wang initially, preferring to let him die, because he was targeted by him when they first met. But he learns to overcome that issue after everything that Lan Ling Wang did to save their world.

- Short-lived crushes:

Initially, he seems to have a thing for Xia Mei when they first met at The Ass Pub. But later on, he develops a crush on Xia Xiong for a short period of time.

- Jiu Wu:

He has mentioned that he and Jiu Wu were classmates in elementary school, but a Chord always bullied him, which frightened him when he found out that Jiu Wu was the new ruler of "Tie Ke Jin Wei Jun" (鐵克禁衛軍 / The Iron Protection Team).

Specialty:
a Chord's primary weapon is a tuning fork called the "Gui Zhan Yin Cha" (鬼戰音叉), which he uses to attack with sound waves.

Alternate counterpart:
a Chord has one alternate counterpart introduced throughout the Zhong Ji series:

In the Gold Dimension: Sha Yu (鯊魚 / Shark) from the first series KO One (終極一班).

He seems to know of Da Dong's existence, but it is unconfirmed whether he knows of his Gold Dimensional counterpart's or not.

== Major characters ==
=== The Master (老掌門) ===
Full name: Ye He Na La Xiong Ba (葉赫那啦‧雄霸).
Blood status: Pure-blood.
Aura: Pink.
Status: Deceased.
Fighting Points:35000+.
Actor: Wang Dao (王道).

Biography:
Ye Si Ren's father, lord of the Ye He Na La family. His son believed that he allowed him to marry Xia Xiong only because he became tired of his rebellious behavior, but in truth he wanted to use their future children as pawns to take over the world: a plan that he has been carefully making for over 20 years. Being the most powerful of the three siblings, Xia Tian went through several obstacles set up by his grandfather to make him stronger, including faking his own death to trick his family.

- The flaw in the plan:

When the time to dominate the world finally comes, he possesses his own son and uses Xia Tian's power to absorb powerful energy to become the ruler the whole dimension and as a result makes Gui Long, Xia Tian's evil half, disappear forever. But his plan backfires when Lan Ling Wang casts a spell to take away the energy he absorbed, and he is killed by the impact of the two spells and his own astral projecting ability.

- Evil plans:

In his lifetime, he has made many experiments to form different armies - be they human or demon. Even Bing Xin and Han were part of his experiments.

Nicknames:
Most people know him as "Lao Zhang Men" (老掌門 / The Master).

Because Xia Tian's maternal grandfather doesn't allow his grandchildren to call him "grandpa", they (or rather Xia Tian and Xia Yu) just refer to him as "Lao Ba De Lao Ba" (老爸的老爸 / Dad's Dad).

Xia Xiong and Xia Liu are more common to call him "Lao Mo Tou" (老魔頭 / similar to Old Monster).

Specialty:
One of his many abilities is an astral projecting power called "Hun You Da Fa" (魂游大法), which enables him to project his soul and take control of another body. However, he cannot stay in this state for too long, otherwise he will be weakened to death. While in astral projecting state, his body must remain safe from outer attacks, otherwise he will easily be killed.

According to Lan Ling Wang, the Master knows an ability called "Xi Mo Shen Gong" (吸魔神功), which can increase his own powers by absorbing outside demonic energy.

=== The Great Traveler (神行者) / The God of Guns (槍靈王) ===
Age: Nearly 200 years old.
Aura: Yellow.
Status: Deceased.
Fighting Points:40000
Actor: George Hu (胡宇崴).

Biography:
The Great Traveler is the master of Jiu Wu, and is a very powerful power-user of good with very shiny teeth that can blind anyone. He is nearly 200 years old, but has the appearance of a 20-something year-old man.

- The God of Guns:

He and the God of Guns (槍靈王) are legendary warriors, known by others as good friends. However, they are in fact the same person, with the Great Traveler as the good half and the God of Guns as the evil half. The Great Traveler never knew anything about the God of Guns being a part of him until Xia Tian and Jiu Wu figured it out. In the end, he sacrifices himself for the sake of the world and restores the balance of the Iron Dimension.

Nicknames:
Jiu Wu calls him "Shi Fu" (師父 / Master).

Xia Tian calls him "Shen Xing Zhe Lao Qian Bei" (神行者老前辈 / Senior Great Traveler).

Specialty:
The Great Traveler is so powerful that his abilities are god-like. His specialty is an attack called "Shen Xing Jiu Bu" (神行九步), an ability that he rarely uses, but has very powerful effects.

His other abilities include "Shen Xing Jiu Zhuan" (神行九轉), which indicates the ability to create illusions and to alter energy movements in a powerful vortex; and "Shen Zhi" (神指 / God's Finger), the ability to give people information when they least suspect it, such as giving them directions to a certain place when they watch TV or see it in an advertisement on a newspaper; and finally "Hua Gu Rou Quan" (化骨柔全), an active attack that indicates every hit seen by the naked eye actually corresponds 280 hits at the same time - it is an attack the Great Traveler never used because he dislikes violence.

The gun "Wu Feng" (烏風) was originally in his evil half's possession, but he passed it on to Xia Xiong years ago.

Alternate counterpart:

An alternate counterpart of the Great Traveler appears in K.O.3an Guo (終極三國) as the main lead. He is named Guan Yu and is the strongest of the Five Tiger Generals.

=== Bing Xin (冰心) ===
Full name: Han Ke La Ma Bing Xin (韓克拉瑪‧冰心).
Blood status: Half-blood.
Age: 16 years old.
Status: Deceased.
Actress: Han (寒).

Biography:
Bing Xin and Han are the same person divided in two during Xia Tian's paternal grandfather's experiment to make a conspiracy; which makes them identical twins. She is also Lan Ling Wang's fiancée.

When Bing Xin was five years old, her mother abandoned her and moved away with Han. She stayed and grew up in the Ye He Na La family's mark.

- Assassination:

The Master ordered her to kill Lan Ling Wang in order to prevent him from lifting the curse put upon him, but because she was already in love with him, she could not bear to do it, and was therefore killed by the assassin Zack, who was Xia Tian's alternate counterpart from the Bronze Dimension.

- Rescue mission:

Everybody believed that she was dead until Han starts sensing her pain and hearing her cry for help, and then they realize that she is being held in a dark dimension where ordinary "Yi Neng Xing Zhe" are converted into demons. They manage to find a way to reclaim her body and soul. However, because her transformation to becoming a demon was interrupted, she began to die slowly.

- Last days:

In order to let Bing Xin spend more time with Lan Ling Wang, Han lends her her life force for three days, which is then the life force must be returned, or else she will die in Bing Xin's place. Though Lan Ling Wang is resistant to let her go, they decide to make the best of their last days together. The two eventually get married and say goodbye to each other in the morning.

- Visions:

During Bing Xin's absence, Han receives multiple visions of her past - mostly her happy moments with Lan Ling Wang. It was via these visions that they discover that Han and Bing Xin are sisters.

Specialty:
Her powers have never been demonstrated, but she is known for being very powerful due to her blood relation to the Han Ke La Ma family.

Although this is not confirmed, there is a possibility that Bing Xin is another "original power-user of thunder" (雷的原位異能行者), because she and Han are made with the same cells.

Alternate counterpart:
Bing Xin is the second alternate counterpart of Cai Yun Han. Though she doesn't use the name Han, the meanings are still the same: Han (寒) means "cold", and Bing Xin (冰心) means "heart of ice".

In the Gold Dimension: Cai Yun Han (蔡雲寒) the 7th ranked KO fighter from the first series KO One (終極一班).
In the Silver Dimension: Da Qiao from the third series K.O.3an Guo (終極三國). Da Qiao is known as the most beautiful student in Jiangdong High School (江東高校) and is Xiao Qiao (小喬)'s older sister.

=== The Fire Ambassador (火焰使者) ===
Status: Alive.
Fighting Points:Stated by Xia Liu as One Nonillion(One with 30 zeros)
Actor: Wu Chun (吳尊) - Fahrenheit (飛輪海).

Biography:
The Fire Ambassador is an executor who stops chaos and restores balance to a dimension, presumably good by nature. Whenever a dimension runs amuck, he will appear to annihilate all the evil with his power of fire. However, this also means that he will eliminate all life in that dimension making the circle of life start over again. from the very beginning. No one can stop him, not even Zhong Ji Tie Ke Ren (終極鐵克人).

Before he arrives, every power-user will have a prophetic dream of his coming, be they powerful or weak.

- Mission and choices:

His order to eliminate the Iron Dimension is altered to annihilating two third evil people in that world after the balance was restored, however, Xia Tian still decides to fight him in order to protect his world and those in it. As the final and most powerful antagonist to be faced, Xia Tian, the band of Dong Cheng Wei (東城衛), and the five original power-users (原位異能行者) meet him in a huge battle. Though he easily overpowers them, he is persuaded by the good in their hearts and decides to leave the Iron Dimension alone, despite the fact he might receive some punishment from his superiors.

Nickname:
Xia Tian called him "Huo Yan" (火焰 / Flame).

Specialty:
As the fire ambassador, all of his powers are fire-based. He can conjure up a powerful fire attack that has enough energy to destroy everything within a planet at once (焱煬炙烈 萬物歸一).

The Fire Ambassador can also shield himself with flames that protect him from others' attacks.

When he travels to a world, he is covered in a flying fireball.

He can also absorb Xia Yu's fire, even when he doesn't have powers.

Alternate counterpart:
Although the Fire Ambassador lives beyond space and time, he does have an alternate counterpart in the Gold Dimension

Tian Hong Guang (田弘光) / Wu Shi Zun (武屍尊) from the first series KO One (終極一班). Descended from a family of powerful martial artists Tian Hong Guang is the top fighter on the KO Rank - KO 1, with over 12000 fighting points. He was reported to have been killed in a terrible car accident, but was in fact kidnapped Wu Li Cai Jue Suo (武力裁决所) thus becoming Wu Shi Zun (武屍尊) under Hei Long (黑龍)'s control.

=== Jiu Lai (灸萊) ===
Full name: Jiu Da Zhang Lao Lai (灸亣镸荖‧萊).
Blood status: Pure-blood.
Age: 13 years old.
Status: Alive.
Fighting Points:14000.
Actor: Lin Yi Xun (林奕勳).

Biography:
Jiu Lai is Jiu Wu's 13-year-old little brother. He has the appearance of a 70-year-old man as result of misusing his powers.

He first appears when Xia Liu calls him for help to oppress Gui Long's newfound power collected from Mie (滅).

- Hobbies:

During free time, he likes to hang out with Demon Hunter and Xia Liu in the mountains where they discuss things, business and/or personal subjects. He could be somewhat bratty at times.

Nicknames:
Because of his old appearance, Xia Mei once called him "Lao Xiao Hai" (老小孩 / Old Kid).

Specialty:
Jiu Lai can use the ability "Zhen Tian Shu" (震天術) to contain evils that are not fully developed. It was this ability that caused Xia Tian to change his nerdy looks (glasses and all) to a much cooler one.

=== Demon Hunter (斬魔獵士) ===
Status: Alive.
Actor: Xia Jing Ting (夏靖庭).

Biography:
Demon Hunter is a friend of Xia Liu. The black line under his nose resembles the nose of a dog.

- Hobbies:

Because he is a big eater, Xia Xiong's cooking is one of his favorites. He likes to hang out with Xia Liu and Jiu Lai during free time.

Specialty:
Demon Hunter is known to be good at tracking evils by smelling their scents, although sometimes he can get distracted by the smell of food.

He also uses an axe called "Kou Yao Zhan" (扣妖斬) as his primary weapon, which has the power to neutralize "demonized power-users" (魔化異能行者).

Alternate counterpart:
The Demon Hunter has an alternate counterpart in the Gold Dimension named Jia Yong, who works as school dean at Da Dong's school and has no special powers of his own.

=== Ye Si Si (葉思思) ===
Full name: Ye He Na La Si Si (葉赫那啦‧思思).
Blood status: Pure-blood.
Status: Alive.
Actor: Li Jie Sheng (李傑聖).

Biography:
Ye Si Si is Ye Si Ren's cousin. According to Ye Si Ren, he is in possession of the third and final melody, "An Hun Qu" (安魂曲 / Soul Calming Melody).

- Power and position:

He acts as the youngest master in the Ye He Na La family, under the control of Ye Xiong Ba, Ye Si Ren's father. After Ye Si Ren returns to his family to find out what his father is planning, he finds out that his cousin has become the family's personal chauffeur.

- Powerless:

When the power of the Ye He Na La family (葉赫那啦家族) was displaced by the death of the lord, Ye Si Si makes his last appearance at his brother's club to try and talk him into rebuilding the family's power by telling him about the conspiracy that his father made to control people. After that, he is never seen again.

Alternate counterpart:
Ye Si Si is the alternate counterpart of Yu Sheng De, Tian Hong Guang's former teacher, in the Gold Dimension.

=== Doctor Xia Gu (黠谷醫仙) ===
Status: Alive.
Actor: Xue Zhi Zheng (薛志正).

Biography:
A childish doctor who once worked for the Ye He Na La family (葉赫那啦家族) as the head doctor. After he met Rou Qing (柔情), his wife, he left the evil world to live a normal life.

- Befriending the Xia Lan Xing De family:

Five years later, he encountered the children of Ye Si Ren, the eldest son whom he admired when he was still working for the Ye He Na La family. His wife worried that their love would only be temporary, but thanks to Han, he was able to prove to her that his love was pure and permanent. Afterwards, whenever the Xia family needed his help, he would come to help them in any way he can.

Nicknames:
Everyone knows him as "Yi Xian" (醫仙 / similar to doctor), but Xia Liu prefers to call him "Gao Xiao A Bei" (搞笑阿伯 / Funny Old Man) because of his funny acts and childishness.

Specialty:
Research, medicine inventing and medicinal treatment.

=== Ren Chen Wen (任晨文) ===
Full name: Ren Ren Wan Nong Chen Wen (任秂完弄‧晨文).
Blood status: Presumably pure-blood.
Age: 18 years old.
Aura: Orange.
Status:alive;missing
Fighting Points:3000
Actor: Zhang Hao Ming / Jin Bao San (張皓明 / 金寶三).

Biography:
Ren Chen Wen is a friend/follower of Xia Tian at school. He often falls victim to Xia Mei's electric power, and to other girls who look pretty on the outside but are in fact deadly dangerous. As a person, he is extremely sure of himself, but is also a coward and a pervert. He hates people calling his full name.

Whenever Xia Mei orders him to do something, he would do it immediately and pull together all of his power to succeed (but complains a lot).

Ren Chen Wen often carries a pink bunny slipper in his back pocket, which he occasionally uses to hit other people's heads, however, it is more common to Xia Mei being the one who uses it to hit him.

- Having followers:

He has two followers from school named Xia Mi and Wa Ge.

- Death:

He is killed by Xia Tian's paternal grandfather after he unawarely spoils his plan to kill Xia Xiong.

Specialty:
Ren Chen Wen has the power to create a mosaic around his face. This ability is mostly triggered by a spell, but it can sometimes be summoned by thought, as demonstrated in the second episode when he triggers his power with fear.

Alternate counterparts:
Ren Chen Wen has two alternate counterparts introduced throughout the Zhong Ji series:

In the Gold Dimension: Jin Bao San (金寶三) from the first series KO One (終極一班). He is also the follower of Wang Da Dong (汪大東), Xia Tian (夏天)'s alternate counterpart. They are both equally stupid and self-proud. Jin Bao San does not appear in the main story, but Ya Se (亞瑟) once mentioned that he had become Da Dong's personal bodyguard, making Da Dong extremely uncomfortable.
In the Silver Dimension: Jiang Gan (蔣幹) from the third series K.O.3an Guo (終極三國). Jiang Gan is the class monitor and student body vice president. He likes to blackmail younger and inferior students.

== Minor characters ==
=== Xia Mi (瞎祕) & Wa Ge (蛙哥) ===
Full names: Mei Shan Lu Yong Xia Mi (槑珊麓苚‧瞎祕) & Mei Shan Lu Yong Wa Ge (槑珊麓苚‧蛙哥).
Blood status: Presumably pure-blood.
Status: Deceased.
Actors: Lu Jian Yu / Xiao La (陸建宇 / 小辣); Ah Mai Er (阿脈兒).

Biography:
They are both a couple of brothers who come from a family of lower level power-users who attend the same school as Xia Tian and Ren Chen Wen, whom they are followers to.

Because Xia Mi and Wa Ge attend school at the same year, it is believed that they are actually twins.

They sometimes fall victims to Xia Mei's electric powers, along with Ren Chen Wen.

Not much is known about them other than their family's full name.

- Deaths:

When Xia Xiong was trapped in the "Shi Kong Jia Feng" (時空夾縫 / separate dimensional wall), she learns that Xia Mi and Wa Ge have been killed along with Ren Chen Wen and Dao Ba Jie Sen (刀疤杰森). But though the time and cause of their deaths remain a mystery, it is quite possible that they were killed some time after Zack was sent back to his dimension.

Alternate counterpart:
Xia Mi is the only one of the two brothers to have an alternate counterpart in the Gold Dimension, Xiao La, who is also the follower of Ren Chen Wen's counterpart; Jin Bao San.

In K.O.3an Guo, Wa Ge has an alternate counterpart in the Silver Dimension named Pang Tong, who is the guardian of a legendary script that contains information about the world of demons.

=== Fire Ant Girl (火蟻女) ===
Blood status: Demon-kind.
Aura: White.
Status: Deceased.
Fighting Points:18000.
Actress: Wang Qiao Cheng (王巧琤).

Biography:
An assassin sent by the Master to kill Lan Ling Wang. She is often in the appearance of an innocent high school girl to seduce boys and attack them when they don't notice. According to Ye Si Ren, the Fire Ant Girl is a being mixed with spirits and fairies, and is therefore a very formidable weapon. Since she isn't human, she can only speak ant language, though she understands human language. To maintain her health, she needs to eat sweets.

- Capture:

She gets captured by Xia Liu and his friends while executing her mission.

- Love life:

During her capture, her beauty somehow attracts Xia Yu's attention and makes him show a caring side that he rarely shows to other people. Because Xia Yu is the one who cares for her the most, they almost look like lovers. Xia Yu is also the only person who could understand her language because he inherited his evil genes from his father and so became her interpreter. Because Xia Liu saved her from the Master, she declares Xia Liu as her new master and stays in the house as ordered.

- Assassination:

She is later killed by Zack sent by the Master to assassinate her for her mistake.

Nicknames:
Because she is named Fire Ant Girl, Xia Liu, Xia Mei and Xia Xiong prefer to call her "Ma Yi" (螞蟻 / Ant).

Specialty:
She commands a specialized army of various kinds of ants. One of the kinds has the ability to make the bitten individual fall under her control with a single bite, no matter how powerful the victim is. She can also control another kind of ants that cause the bitten individual to act on sexual instincts. Her strongest attack is "Wan Yi Gong Xin" (萬蟻攻心 / Million Ants Attack the Heart), the ability to seduce the victim, making him defenseless and then command her thousands of ants to eat away at him until there is nothing left but bones.

Alternate counterpart:
Fire Ant Girl has one alternate counterpart introduced throughout the Zhong Ji series:

In the Gold Dimension: Liang Zhi (兩指) from the first series KO One (終極一班). A late transfer student who joins Zhong Ji Yi Ban (終極一班) with her sister Xia Ba (下巴) after Bai Linda and Tao Zi leave.

=== The Illusionary Eye (幻眼) ===
Status: Alive.

Biography:
The first primary antagonist for the Xia Lan Xing De family (夏蘭荇德家族) to encounter. He was a power-user of the darkness, who lost his body and just left behind an eye of illusion.

- Multiple attempts:

On several occasions he had tried to obtain the "Feng Long Ka" (封龍卡 / Seal Dragon Card) from the Xia family in order to become whole again; first by sending minion Vincent to get close to Xia Xiong and date her; then he tried to make a deal with Gui Long to take the Feng Long Ka but Gui Long refused; he then activated "Shi Xin Sha Shou" (石心殺手 / Stone-Hearted Assassin) in Han and ordered her to kill Xia Tian in attempt to steal it. When all of those failed, he sent his last minion, Professor G, to turn Xia Yu against his family by giving him a ring named "Mo Jie" (魔借) to give him powers and use him to obtain the object. When he realized that Xia Yu was born a power-user of darkness, he tried to take over his body to become corporeal again and to obtain the Feng Long Ka one last time. However, Ye Si Ren came in and showed him "Xi Hun Qu" (洗魂曲 / Soul Cleansing Melody), which made him run away in fear and had not been seen again since then.

Nicknames:
He is often titled the Eye with no S.

Specialty:
Though the Illusionary Eye doesn't have a physical body, he can manipulate objects in the physical realm at will and control energy to his advantage.

=== Vincent ===
Full name: Hu Yan Jue Luo Vincent (呼延覺羅‧Vincent).
Blood status: Pure-blood.
Aura: Blue.
Status: Unknown.
Actor: Den Cheng Ju (單承矩).

Biography:
Vincent was Xia Xiong's boyfriend from the first episodes. He was thought to be the owner of Tayoto, but in truth was a servant sent by the Illusionary Eye to obtain the "Feng Long Ka" (封龍卡) by getting close to Xia Xiong. The Xia siblings didn't like him since the start, because they didn't like the idea of their mother dating other men.

- Revelation:

When Xia Tian, Xia Mei and Xia Yu found out that their powers were suppressed by a demonized power-user (魔化異能行者), they tried to expose him in front of their mother. Their attempt succeeded, but then he attacked them with his spell to control others. The family was in great trouble and almost killed each other until Xiu cast his controlling spell on him and turned the fight around, but Vincent managed to escape Xiu's grip. His master was spared by his life, but he was tortured as punishment for his failure. He was not seen again since then.

Specialty:
Because Vincent is a blood relative of the Hu Yan Jue Luo family (呼延覺羅家族), he can use spells to control other's actions according to his command.

=== Dao Ba Jie Sen (刀疤杰森) ===
Status: Deceased.
Actor: Huang Wan Bo / K Yi Ba (黃萬伯 / K一吧).

Biography:
A man who lacks the courage and brain. At first, he appeared to be a "Ma Gua" (麻瓜), but afterwards he reveals himself to be a "power-user" (異能行者) with lower level abilities but nevertheless plays an important role in the story.

When he first appeared, he made Xia Tian owe him $700, and has tried to go after Xia Tian to get the money on several occasions, but failed every single time. First, he was stopped by Xia Mei; Second, he accidentally took off Xia Tian's Feng Long Tie and got defeated by Gui Long (this marks also Gui Long's first appearance). Finally, he met Xia Tian again on the street, but this time Xia Tian gave him all the money he had on him (though it wasn't enough) and walked away.

In a flashback, his younger version and his gang picked on Little Han and took her hairpin, but Little Xia Tian stopped them and rescued her (or rather she rescued him).

He once bumped into Xiu who was injured after battling Han. He tried to offer to take him to a hospital and give him money to buy medicine, but he refused.

- Key Man:

After missing out in many episodes, Dao Ba Jie Sen reappears at the Xia family's household and reveals that he is Key Man, a man with the power to close the space-time portal. In order to protect him from evil, the family is forced to let him live in their house under the orders of Jiu Wu. When Xia Tian goes to the Gold Dimension to read a manga series that foretells their future, he finds out that Dao Ba Jie Sen will be sacrificed to lock the portal. Everyone then tries to protect him in every way they can, but in the end, he is still captured and used to lock the portal and becomes a head statue in the process.

Specialty:
As Key Man, he holds the power to closing to space-time portal, which evils will take advantage of to attack the Iron Dimension.

Dao Ba Jie Sen seems to have the ability to see things in the form of dreams, although the dreams fit into his own style, such as being worshipped by his protectors.

Alternate counterpart:
He is the only person who shares exactly the same aspects with his alternate counterpart in the Gold Dimension; name and personality; and a scar that formulates an X on his face.

In K.O.3an Guo (終極三國), Dao Ba Jie Sen is revealed to have another alternate counterpart in the Silver Dimension named Li Shi Zhen.

=== Faceless Peace (沒臉和平) ===
Status: Alive.
Actor: De Yang (德楊).

Biography:
A loyal servant of the Ye He Na La family (葉赫那啦家族). This man doesn't have any notable powers, but does act like a powerful butler. This man has no eyes, no nose and no mouth, but has a white face with the word "Peace" (和平) written on it. He supports the Master's plan in dominating the world and takes his orders very seriously. He was last seen with the dead Master and beholding the failure of his plan.

=== Xiao Long Nu (小聾女) & Guo Er (過兒) ===
Status: Alive.
Actors: Wang Yi Wen / Qiu Er (王怡文 / 球兒 ); Eric Li (利昂霖).

Biography:
A couple of magical doctors, and lovers.

When Ye Si Ren explained to Xia Yu how they discovered he was a Ma Gua, a flashback was shown with Ye Si Ren and Xia Xiong taking Baby Xia Yu to the two doctors, who were as young as they are now, which makes it seem that they have lived for hundreds of years unaged.

Whenever they check on a patient, they always reply with either "Dead for sure" (死定了!死定了) or "Cannot be saved" (沒救了!).

Xiao Long Nu has a habit of acting as if she doesn't hear anything (The Long (聾) used here means deaf), but she actually does.

These two characters were written off in the middle of the show, but Xiao Long Nu's apprentice has appeared in the loft of "Tie Ke Jin Wei Jun" (鐵克禁衛軍 / The Iron Protection Team) caring for Jiu Wu (灸舞) and Xia Tian.

Nicknames:
Xiao Long Nu is only titled Gu Gu (姑姑).

Specialty:
Whenever someone calls out their names, they will appear immediately, even if they are by accident.

As doctors, they are very resourceful and knowledgeable about medicine.

Xiao Long Nu is known for checking on people's conditions by poking her two fingers into her patient's nose.

Alternate counterpart: xiao long nu has a counterpart in ko3an guo whose name is unknown but she appear in the memory flashback of xiao qiao accompanying xiao qiao back home when they saw da qiao and zhou yu together.

=== Zhen Zi (貞子) ===
Blood status: Demon-kind.
Status: Alive.
Actress: Ni Pei Wei (倪裴薇).

Biography:
A lower-level female demon that appears in the initial episodes. She appears in a green glow and wears nothing other than a white robe. Zhen Zi has been friends with Xia Mei since childhood, and only she can contact her. When Xia Mei was small, Xia Liu taught her to use garlic breath against Zhen Zi, probably as a way to make her obey if she ever gets out of control.

In history facts, Xia Yu once threw a cat into the dimension of Mie (滅) when he was in junior high, and Zhen Zi was told of this matter by the cat itself and later passed on the information to Xia Mei.

Specialty:
Whenever Xia Mei becomes Gui Wa, Zhen Zi would be summoned to help scare people as a ghost.

She is also capable of telepathically communicating with someone in the physical plane.

== The Gold Dimension (金時空) ==
The characters below come from the first series: KO One.

=== Wang Da Dong (汪大東) ===
Blood status: Pure-blood.
Age: 21.
Aura: Red.
Status: Alive.
Actor: Jiro Wang (汪東城) - Fahrenheit (飛輪海) / Dong Cheng Wei (東城衛).

Biography:
Wang Da Dong - one of the former protagonists in the first show: KO One - is the ring leader of his school gang "Zhong Ji Yi Ban" (終極一班 / Ultimate Class) and is also KO.3 in the Gold Dimension.

He lost his power in a fierce battle against an evil force during the end of KO One.

- Inability to adjust a normal life:

He is the only one having a hard time adjusting the life without powers and battles and yearns for that life to return. To get his mind off of despair and dramatic thoughts, he spends more time in reading, which improves his brain's skills.

Nicknames:
His friend Ya Se nicknames him "Zhi Da Kuang" (自大狂 / Egomaniac), but most people know him as "Da Dong Ge" (大東哥 / Big Brother Da Dong) or "Dong Ge" (東哥 / Big Brother Dong).

Specialty:
Da Dong has a weapon named "Long Wen Ao" (龍紋鏊 / Dragon Tattooed Pan), which is a cooking pan that can be used to attack with enormous power and vary the flow of the user's power level and transfer energy.

Alternate counterparts:
Da Dong has Xia Tian as his alternate counterpart in the Iron Dimension, and Zack as his other counterpart in the Bronze Dimension. His weapon, Long Wen Ao, was once borrowed to Xia Tian when he needed a weapon to fight Lan Ling Wang, Ya Se's alternate counterpart.

In the third series, Da Dong's alternate counterpart, Sun Ce appears.

Sequel:
In K.O.3an Guo (終極三國), he travels to the Silver Dimension with his friends and accidentally causes a giant rock to fall down on Xiu's alternate counterpart, Liu Bei. Then, he takes Liu Bei back to the Gold Dimension for treatment while Xiu takes his place until Liu Bei recovers from his injuries.

=== Wang Ya Se (王亞瑟) ===
Blood status: Presumably pure-blood.
Age: 21.
Aura: Light blue.
Status: Alive.
Actor: Calvin Chen (辰亦儒) - Fahrenheit (飛輪海).

Biography:
Wang Ya Se is also KO.3, right beside Da Dong, in the Gold Dimension, and is also one of the former protagonists in the first show: KO One.

He lost his power in a fierce battle against an evil force during the end of KO One.

- Past times:

Ya Se's initial relationship with Da Dong is like that of the relationship between Lan Ling Wang and Xia Tian. Both were untrustful of each other at first, but later became very good friends.

His girlfriend Cai Wu Xiong is briefly mentioned by Da Dong when he expressed the depression of losing his powers, but her whereabouts remain unknown.

Nicknames:
He is nicknamed "Zhi Lian Kuang" (自戀狂 / Narcissist) by Da Dong, but most people know him as "Ya Se Wang" (亞瑟王 / King Arthur) with his last and first names switching positions.

Specialty:
Ya Se once carried the weapon "Shi Zhong Jian" (石中剑 / The Sword in the Stone), but after the final battle, it is possible that he has thrown it away because the stone that keeps the sword under control has lost its power.

Alternate counterpart:
Ya Se's counterpart in the Iron Dimension is Lan Ling Wang. Xia Tian is the first person (after Xiu) to find out that Lan Ling Wang's counterpart is friends with his counterpart Da Dong.

Sequel:
In K.O.3an Guo (終極三國), he travels to the Silver Dimension with his friends where Da Dong accidentally causes a giant rock to fall down on Xiu's alternate counterpart, Liu Bei. Then, he takes Liu Bei back to the Gold Dimension for treatment while Xiu takes his place until Liu Bei recovers from his injuries.

=== Ding Xiao Yu (丁小雨) ===
Blood status: Half-blood.
Age: 21.
Aura: Gold.
Status: Alive.
Actor: Aaron Yan (炎亞綸) - Fahrenheit (飛輪海).

Biography:
Ding Xiao Yu is KO.4 in the Gold Dimension, and one of the former protagonists in the first show: KO One.

His name means little rain.

He lost his powers in a fierce battle against an evil force during the end of KO One.

- Past times:

He was very quiet initially and fights only when someone hits his head, but becomes more open after he becomes friends with Da Dong and Ya Se. He and Ya Se enjoy the life of peace and without powers while Da Dong has a hard time adjusting it.

Nicknames:
People often call him "Nai Da Wang" (耐打王 / Fighter King) and "Yao Ming De Xiao Yu" (要命的小雨 / means something similar to Xiao Yu that takes lives).

Specialty:
Before Xiao Yu lost his powers, he used his fists as battle weapons. His left fist was powerful as an atomic bomb while his right fist was ten times the power.

Alternate counterpart:
Xiao Yu's alternate counterpart in the Iron Dimension is Jiu Wu, who rules an organization to protect the Iron Dimension. While Jiu Wu is playful and pranky, he is just quiet.

Sequel:
In K.O.3an Guo (終極三國), he travels to the Silver Dimension with his friends where Da Dong accidentally causes a giant rock to fall down on Xiu's alternate counterpart, Liu Bei. Then, he takes Liu Bei back to the Gold Dimension for treatment while Xiu takes his place until Liu Bei recovers from his injuries.

=== Duan Chang Ren (斷腸人) ===
Blood status: Presumably pure-blood.
Status: Alive.
Actor: Na Wei Xun (那維勲).

Biography:
Duan Chang Ren is a strange man who runs a food stall. He is often mysterious and whenever Da Dong, Ya Se and Xiao Yu come to visit for food and have hard time understanding things, he gives them useful advice.

Duan Chang Ren's true name is Hong Long (紅龍 / Red Dragon).

His most special treats are "Zhen Zhu Nai Cha" (珍珠奶茶 / Pearl Tea) and "Ba Xian Guo Hai" (八仙過海 / Eight Fairies Cross The River). But his pearl tea is actually milk taken from his dog named Zhen Zhu (珍珠 / Pearl), thus the drink is named after it. Da Dong, Ya Se and Xiao Yu have an unforgettable history with this drink.

- Evil twin:

Duan Chang Ren's twin brother, Hei Long is the antagonist of the series of KO One. After his defeat, Duan Chang Ren brought him to an abandoned warehouse where he spends his life in.

Alternate counterpart:
His alternate counterpart in the Iron Dimension is Ye Si Ren, the father of Xia Tian, who is also the alternate counterpart of Da Dong.

Duan Chang Ren once told Da Dong, Ya Se and Xiao Yu about dreaming of an old man standing in front of him; probably because of the connection between him and Ye Si Ren and his retained ability to see things that happen to someone else in his dreams.

=== Hei Long (黑龍) ===
Blood status: Presumably pure-blood.
Status: Hospitalized.
Actor: Na Wei Xun (那維勲).

Biography:
Hei Long is Duan Chang Ren's evil twin brother and the final antagonist of KO One. He went crazy after losing his powers in a battle against the KO fighters - Wang Da Dong, Wang Ya Se, Ding Xiao Yu and Lei Ke Si - and was taken to an abandoned warehouse since.

- Retained ability:

He makes a few appearances when Xiu (脩) goes to ask him questions about something that only evil and powerful power-users can understand.

His name means "Black Dragon".

Alternate counterpart:
His alternate counterpart in the Iron Dimension is Ye Si Ren.

=== Lei Ke Si (雷克斯) ===
Blood status: Presumably pure-blood.
Aura: Green.
Status: Alive.
Actor: Danson Tang (唐禹哲).

Biography:
Lei Ke Si (雷克斯) does not appear in the story, but he made an appearance in The X-Family opening theme as the reflection of Xia Yu's alternate counterpart, alongside Sha Jie.

Lei Ke Si is the second-ranked KO fighter. Lei Ke Si is one of the five KO fighters whose power was lost in the final battle between good and evil, but he and the first on the KO rank are the only ones who don't return to reclaim it.

- Involvement:

Aside from the opening theme, Lei Ke Si has also appeared in a flashback of the KO fighters' final battle against Hei Long, and in an image of the Top Ten KO Ranking Record when Xia Tian travelled to the Gold Dimension.

Nickname:
Lei Ke Si carries the title "Zhan Shen" (戰神 / War God).

Specialty:
Lei Ke Si used to wield a metal glove called "Ah Rui Si Zhi Shou" (阿瑞斯之手 / Ares' Hand). It was reclaimed from the world of darkness, which made him powerful and evil. During the final combat, he lent it to Xiao Yu in order to fight against Hei Long.

Alternate counterpart:
Lei Ke Si has one alternate counterpart introduced throughout the Zhong Ji series:

In the Iron Dimension: Xia Yu (夏宇) and his alternate personality Gui Feng (鬼鳳) from the second series The X-Family (终极一家). Xia Yu is the eldest of the three siblings in the Xia Family and is the "original power-user of fire" (火的原位異能行者). Both are very smart and can therefore handle school life very easily.

=== Sha Jie (煞姊) ===
Status: Alive.
Actress: Sunnie Huang (黃小柔).

Biography:
Sha Jie does not appear in the story, but she has appeared in The X-Family opening theme as reflection of Xia Mei's alternate counterpart, alongside Lei Ke Si.

Sha Jie is the 13th KO fighter.

- Involvement:

In KO One, she was in love with Da Dong, but was unsuccessful in winning his heart and left the show early.

Nicknames:
She sometimes calls herself "Sha Mei Mei" (煞妹妹 / Little Sister Sha) when she is around Da Dong.

Specialty:
Her real capabilities are unknown, but her strength appears to be above human.

Alternate counterpart:
Sha Jie has one alternate counterpart introduced throughout the Zhong Ji series

In the Iron Dimension: Xia Mei (夏美) from the second series The X-Family (终极一家). Both Xia Mei and Sha Jie are instinctive, they act very petty and hostile against those they hate and are passionate or rather obsessive towards those they love. However, Sha Jie is more devoted.

Sha Jie's status as KO 13, would seem that she is the only person whose power is stronger than her Iron Dimension counterpart's.

== The Bronze Dimension (銅時空) ==
=== Zack ===
Blood Status: Half-blood.
Status: Alive.
Fighting Points:31500+
Actor: Jiro Wang (汪東城) - Fahrenheit (飛輪海) / Dong Cheng Wei (東城衛).

Biography:
Zack is a well-known psycho killer from the Bronze Dimension, sent by the Master to the Iron Dimension in attempt to make Xia Tian stronger.

Because Zack bears a strikingly similar appearance to Gui Long (except he does not have the skull mark on his neck), he been mistaken as Gui Long on many occasions, including the assassination of Bing Xin, as well as Fire Ant Girl and the leader of Bei Cheng Wei (北城衛).

When Xia Tian finds a way to become stronger than Zack, he is driven back to his dimension.

Specialty:
Zack can control the "Gui Ling Yan Huo Qiu" (鬼靈焰火球 / Ghostly Fireball) - a fireball that absorbs his target's energy and drain their powers before killing them with it. He can also swallow the fireball to temporarily increase his power.

Alternate counterparts:
Zack's alternate counterpart in the Iron Dimension is Xia Tian while his other alternate counterpart in the Gold Dimension is Wang Da Dong. His third alternate counterpart in the Silver Dimension is Sun Ce.

== See also ==
- List of KO One characters
- List of K.O.3an Guo characters
