= List of The X-Family episodes =

This is the episode guide of The X-Family (終極一家). It first aired on GTV in 2007.

== Episode list ==
No.	Title	Original release date
1	"Round 1"	August 8, 2007
The story begins with Xiu using his power to summon thunder to help restore the powers of Wang Da Dong, Wang Ya Se and Ding Xiao Yu, but the result is unsuccessful. Xiu tells Da Dong, Ya Se and Xiao Yu the final way to restore their powers: by travelling to another world and find their alternate counterparts and use them to restore their powers. Da Dong's alternate counterpart, Xia Tian takes over the story.
2	"Round 2"	August 9, 2007
The Xia Lan Xing De family is attacked by a couple of strangers. Xiu's band, Dong Cheng Wei, perform at Xia Tian's father's pub. There, Xiu accidentally senses Xia Tian's special power. When Ren Chen Wen and Xia Tian encounter a gang, Xia Tian turns into Gui Long and attacks the gang, and then uses his power to attract young women.
3	"Round ]"	August 10, 2007
Xia Xiong goes on a date, but the three siblings and their father sabotage their mother's date by luring her away and letting Xia Mei scare Vincent half to death. Xiu visits Xia Tian and offers to teach him how to play guitar. That same night, Xiu tells Xia Tian that he has the potential to become Zhong Ji Tie Ke Ren, the saviour of worlds.
4	"Round 4"	August 13, 2007
Despite Xiu's telling, Xia Tian has no interest in becoming Zhong Ji Tie Ke Ren and just wants to practice playing guitar. Xia Xiong invites her boyfriend Vincent over to her house, but the Xia siblings and their father play tricks and sabotage her date... again.
5	"Round 5"	August 14, 2007
Xia Xiong finds out about Xia Tian's wish to become a musician and breaks his guitar. Xia Tian begs his mother to give him support, and after a rainy drama, she agrees. Vincent visits Ye Si Ren, the siblings' father, at his pub and convinces him accept the fact that he is together with Xia Xiong now.
6	"Round 6"	August 15, 2007
Vincent reveals his true identity as a demonized power-user and attacks the Xia Lan Xing De family, only to get defeated by Xiu's spell. After that, Xia Xiong invites Xiu and his friend A Chord over for dinner. Later, she asks Xiu to not train Xia Tian to control his power, even though he has the potential to become Zhong Ji Tie Ke Ren.
7	"Round 7"	August 16, 2007
The Xia family finds out that Ye Si Ren has used their house and their company to help a friend return 10 million dollars. When the loan shark came, Xia Tian and Ye Si Ren are saved by a mysterious young woman. Xia Tian investigates with his friends and finally finds out that the girl who saved them was the one he met when he was young, and the one that he has loved since then.
8	"Round 8"	August 17, 2007
Xia Tian offers Han, his dream girl, to rent a room in their house and on several occasions tries to connect with her, but she keeps blowing him off. When Xiu and Han meet, they start to fight and Xia Tian tries to stop them by running into the middle of the battle and ends up getting himself hurt.
9	"Round 9"	August 20, 2007
Xia Tian and Xiu find a couple of peace-making bracelets to make peace between Han and Xiu. Han finds out that Xia Tian is the boy she met when she was young, but she just tells him to forget about her, saying "We're too different. I would never fall for you. You should just give up." Ye Si Ren talks Xia Xiong into going out on a romantic weekend with him.
10	"Round 10"	August 21, 2007
Xia Mei, the little sister, accidentally throws Han's drumsticks into Mie. When Han realizes that her drumsticks have disappeared, she starts feeling dizzy and eventually collapse. According to the magical doctors, Han's spirit is transferred into her drumsticks and if they're not returned within two hours, her body will die. When Xia Tian realizes that there is no other choice, he rushes into Mie and gets his life in danger.
11	"Round 11"	August 22, 2007
Xia Tian trades Han's soul and weapons for his own. The demon within Mie later decides to let Xia Tian return to the human world, but in exchange, Gui Long, his evil half, becomes powerful enough to break free and take over Xia Tian's body.
12	"Round 12"	August 23, 2007
Xia Liu, the grandfather, calls for help from his friend Jiu Lai. He manages to suppress Gui Long, but tells them that Xia Tian must find a way to take over Gui Long and harness the demonic energy that he absorbed when he was in Mie, otherwise Gui Long will take over and their world will have another opponent to fight. The Xia family goes on an experiment to make Xia Tian stronger, but the results prove unsuccessful.
13	"Round 13"	August 24, 2007
Xiu tells Xia Tian about the existence of his counterpart and that the fate of the universe lie on him. Xia Tian promises to keep fighting, but he also makes Xiu promise that he would kill him if Gui Long takes over. The Illusionary Eye awakes the Stone-Hearted Assassin in Han and makes her go after Xia Tian. Da Dong tells Xiu to encourage Xia Tian to keep fighting, which he does and makes Xia Tian able to win Gui Long's superior power.
14	"Round 14"	August 27, 2007
Han begins to turn into stone, Xia Tian decides to save her no matter what. Even if Xia Xiong protests, he still insists on saving her. Xiu, Xia Tian and A Chord discuss and come to the fact that they can use the Soul Collecting Melody from the evil Ye He Na La family to revive Han. After the discussion, A Chord mysteriously receives the Soul Collecting Melody and Xia Tian uses it to revive Han, but she ends up losing her memory about everything that happened.
15	"Round 15"	August 28, 2007
Xia Xiong sends Han away without revealing her whereabouts. Xia Tian goes out to find her, but is unsuccessful. When Han finally returns, Xia Xiong reveals to him that she has merely sent her to the magical doctors' office to determine her amnesia. Xiu transfers his element of wind to Xia Tian and tells him that he must collect four other elements to become Zhong Ji Tie Ke Ren. When Xia Xiong gives Xia Tian the responsibility of being the lord of the house, Xia Yu (the eldest sibling) becomes jealous; which grows even stronger when he finds out that she has always kept their family heirloom, Feng Long Ka, inside of Xia Tian's body. Xia Yu starts seeing visions that keep telling him that he is no Ma Gua.
16	"Round 16"	August 29, 2007
It reveals that Xia Yu has always wishes that he would have powers of his own, because his parents always ignored him and paid more attention to Xia Tian and Xia Mei. A professor at Xia Yu's university gives Xia Yu a magical ring that bestows him magical powers. Xia Yu uses it to play tricks on people, and when its energy runs out, he seeks out to absorb the power of power-users.
17	"Round 17"	August 30, 2007
Xia Yu continues to hunt power-users and absorb their powers. Later, he finally taps into his own power and kills the professor that gave him the ring. With a dream warning from their respective buddies, Xia Tian and Xia Mei discover that Xia Yu is the demonized power-user that has been attacking other power-users.
18	"Round 18"	August 31, 2007
In order to save Xia Yu from turning evil, Ye Si Ren reveals his identity as the heir of the Ye He Na La family, the most powerful dark family there is, and uses the Soul Cleansing Melody to strip away Xia Yu's powers.
19	"Round 19"	September 3, 2007
With Ye Si Ren's identity revealed, Xia Xiong expresses her true feelings to make him stay. When things finally get back on track between the two lovers, Ye Si Ren discovers something about Han's background. Xia Tian begins to go on training with Xiu to control/suppress Gui Long.
20	"Round 20"	September 4, 2007
Ye Si Ren finds out that Han is actually his long lost daughter, and tries to split up Han and Xia Tian by all means. Xia Xiong starts planning a wedding gown in hopes to reunite with Ye Si Ren.
21	"Round 21"	September 5, 2007
A mysterious power-user just appears and disappears around Dong Cheng Wei and the Xia Lan Xing De family. The youngsters finally hear from their father that they are half-siblings, and painfully split up and Han moves out of the house.
22	"Round 22"	September 6, 2007
The mysterious man that sneaks around the Xia Lan Xing De family and Dong Cheng Wei appears to be Lan Ling Wang, a powerful and well-trained soldier of the Ye He Na La family, and make matters worse, he is the alternate counterpart of Wang Ya Se. A Chord tries to fight him, but ends up getting hurt in the process. Dong Cheng Wei, Xia Liu and Xia Xiong try to fend him off, but he easily surpasses their magic. The outcome of the fight ends with Ye Si Ren coming into the middle and ordering Lan Ling Wang to have a private conversation with him.
23	"Round 23"	September 7, 2007
Ye Si Ren finds out that his father died a while ago. Ye Si Si, Ye Si Ren's younger brother, orders Lan Ling Wang to give him a letter from his father. But when Ye Si Ren takes the letter, he gets poisoned. To get the antidote, Xia Tian, Xia Mei, Xia Yu, Ren Chen Wen, Han, Xia Mi and Wa Ge go out and search for the legendary doctor Yi Xian, the doctor who once worked for the Ye He Na La family. The doctor agrees to give them the antidote if they manage to pass three tests.
24	"Round 24"	September 10, 2007
With two tests passed, Yi Xian gives them the final task: to make his wife smile. Everyone tries to make her smile, but nothing works. Suddenly, Han rushes to the doctor's wife's side and threatens to kill her unless he strips away his powers and kills himself. When she realizes how much her husband truly loves her, she smiles and Han reveals that she has only been playing them to make the doctor's wife realize that she has true love on her side.
25	"Round 25"	September 11, 2007
Lan Ling Wang challenges Xia Tian a duel to reclaim the two melodies. Xiu borrows Da Dong's weapon to Xia Tian to make him strong enough to win Lan Ling Wang's power. But before the battle can start, Lan Ling Wang's servant rushes to him and tells him that his family has been captured. Ye Si Ren gives Lan Ling Wang the melodies so he can use them to trade for his family.
26	"Round 26"	September 12, 2007
Lan Ling Wang becomes powerless and hunted by all demonized power-users, rumoured that he went after the Ye He Na La family. To make matters worse, Lan Ling Wang's family is killed. Xia Mei asks help from her friends to find him. Ye Si Ren and Han move back into the Xia Lan Xing De family's house.
27	"Round 27"	September 13, 2007
Xia Mei tries to impress Lan Ling Wang with several performances, but ends up getting ditched. Lan Ling Wang meets Han, whom he recognized as his fiancée, but before he could say anything, she knocks him out.
28	"Round 28"	September 14, 2007
Meng Zhu (Ruler of the Iron Dimension) asks to have a meeting with Lan Ling Wang, but because nobody knows what he truly wants, Xia Mei takes Lan Ling Wang away before Dong Cheng Wei have the chance to take him.
29	"Round 29"	September 17, 2007
Bei Cheng Wei finally find Lan Ling Wang, but before they can take him away, Xia Xiong appears and show them the special order from Meng Zhu to leave Lan Ling Wang alone. Lan Ling Wang ends up living in the Xia Lan Xing De family's household. Xia Liu is so angry at the others for letting him stay that he moves out. Meng Zhu calls and pays a visit to the Xia Lan Xing De family. At the end of the episode, Meng Zhu is revealed to be Jiu Wu, Ding Xiao Yu's alternate counterpart.
30	"Round 30"	September 18, 2007
Jiu Wu visits the Xia Lan Xing De family and becomes friends with them. Meng Zhu meet the Dong Cheng Wei, Xiu finds out that Jiu Wu is the alternate counterpart of Xiao Yu. Xia Tian dreamed of Meng Zhu asked him to call out Gui Long to hit him 3 times, Gui Long managed to knock out Meng Zhu in 2 hits
31	"Round 31"	September 19, 2007
Jiu Wu tells Xia Tian and Lan Ling Wang that they both have the quality of becoming Zhong Ji Tie Ke Ren. When Xia Tian hears that Lan Ling Wang's chance is bigger, he becomes depressed and wonders if he should just give up and help Lan Ling Wang. However, Lan Ling Wang is no interest of becoming Zhong Ji Tie Ke Ren, because he claims that it was magic that got his family killed. At the same time, they discover that Lan Ling Wang is the original power-user of lightning, which makes it important for him to restore his powers so that he can transfer his element to Xia Tian's body.
32	"Round 32"	September 20, 2007
Lan Ling Wang and the Xia Lan Xing De family gets attacked by an army of ants controlled by the Fire Ant Girl. Ye Si Ren starts to suspect that his father is still alive.
33	"Round 33"	September 21, 2007
Xia Liu captures the Fire Ant Girl, and claims that Ye Si Ren and his father have been planning to marry his daughter and use their relationship to defeat them. By the orders of the lord of the house, Xia Liu kicks out Ye Si Ren, Lan Ling Wang and Han. At the same time, Xia Yu develops a crush on the Fire Ant Girl.
34	"Round 34"	September 24, 2007
Ye Si Ren gets a visit from his father in his dreams and starts acting strange since then. With everyone on Ye Si Ren's side, Xia Liu gives up his grudge against him. The Fire Ant Girl is killed by "Gui Long" while everyone was out.
35	"Round 35"	September 25, 2007
To find out who the killer was, they use the surveillance tape that recorded the day the Fire Ant Girl was killed, but only to discover that Gui Long was the killer. Han also starts to receive visions of Lan Ling Wang's fiancée's moment when she was killed, and the killer was "Gui Long". To figure out the letter's meaning, Xiu goes to the Gold Dimension and finds Ye Si Ren's evil counterpart, Hei Long, to find answers.
36	"Round 36"	September 26, 2007
Ye Si Ren's father is determined to be alive and is possessing "Gui Long" to spread havoc. "Gui Long" goes to attack Xia Xiong, but she manages to protect herself. Han tells Xiu that "Gui Long" is the killer of Bing Xin, Lan Ling Wang's fiancée, but he has been eavesdropping. When he determines that "Gui Long" is the killer, he decides to seek revenge.
37	"Round 37"	September 27, 2007
Lan Ling Wang challenges Gui Long, but gets defeated easily. After the battle, Xia Tian disappears out of sight and everybody spreads out to look for him. On Xia Mei's birthday, she gets possessed by Ye Si Ren's father and goes after Xia Xiong. But then Ren Chen Wen comes into the middle of things and ruins his plan. Afterwards, Ren Chen Wen is killed.
38	"Round 38"	September 28, 2007
Lan Ling Wang seeks Yi Xian to find out if there is any way to restore his powers to that he can kill Gui Long. After a day or so, everybody finds out that the "Gui Long" that has been causing trouble to people has only been Zack, the alternate counterpart of Xia Tian from the Bronze Dimension.
39	"Round 39"	October 1, 2007
Xia Tian goes under the experiment to overpower Zack. Xia Xiong determines to use her gun, Wu Feng to amplify Xia Tian's power. However, if his heart is not pure, the results can be fatal. Xia Tian has a mental conversation with Gui Long about the serious situation, and makes him agree to temporarily let Xia Tian take over.
40	"Round 40"	October 2, 2007
With some help from Xia Xiong, Jiu Wu's master - the Great Traveler, and finally Han; Xia Tian finally overpowers Zack and sends him back to his dimension, and he gets the element of thunder from Han. Later they then realized that Han is the original power-user of thunder. Lan Ling Wang returns.
41	"Round 41"	October 3, 2007
Han suddenly dances in front of Lan Ling Wang and makes him stay. Han discovers that she and Bing Xin are twins. Ye Si Ren gets a visit from his father and decides to go back to the Ye He Na La family to find out what he is planning.
42	"Round 42"	October 4, 2007
With Jiu Wu unable to preserve the protective force field, Xia Tian becomes the substitute. As the day of Ji Yin Zhi Ri (Day of the Ultimate Yin, also known as Eclipse) comes closer, everyone works together to protect their world.
43	"Round 43"	October 5, 2007
Because neither Jiu Wu or Xia Tian would have enough power to preserve the force field before Ji Yin Zhi Ri arrives, Lan Ling Wang is chosen to enter Mie and reclaim a piece of a mythological stone that will help them maintain it.
44	"Round 44"	October 8, 2007
Lan Ling Wang takes the magical stone back to his world. But when Jiu Wu tries to use its magic, it infects him with dark energy and slowly turns him evil. When he attacks Xia Tian and Xiu, they decide to look him in Ye Si Ren's evil-repressing coffin which he used for sleeping.
45	"Round 45"	October 9, 2007
The more Jiu Wu sleeps in the coffin, more of his male hormones are simulate.Then, Jiu Wu starts to have an interest in Han. Ye Si Ren's father offers to help absorb the energy of the magical stone by possessing Xia Tian. Because their options are running short, Xia Tian decides to take the offer. Ye Si Ren digs his way out of the Ye He Na La family's mark and warns them about his father's master plan: to use him and Xia Tian to take over the world on Ji Yin Zhi Ri.
46	"Round 46"	October 10, 2007
Everyone works together to prevent Ye Si Ren from getting possessed and Xia Tian's power from getting absorbed. However, Ye Xiong Ba (Ye Si Ren's father) blows them off by making a clone of Ye Si Ren and abducting the real one before they notice anything.
47	"Round 47"	October 11, 2007
Ji Yin Zhi Ri has finally arrived, but as Ye Xiong Ba absorbs the dark energy to make him all-powerful, Lan Ling Wang learns a spell from his ancestor and stops his plan and gets further results when Ye Xiong Ba dies and he gets his powers back and Xia Yu comes into his, becoming Gui Feng. But as the spell went back Mie, Xia Xiong disappears out of sight as the dark energy forced her to Mie while she belong to the Iron Dimension.
48	"Round 48"	October 12, 2007
Everyone does their best to find Xia Xiong, but their results end with no further progress. Xia Tian decides to join Dong Cheng Wei as the lead singer. They learn from the Great Traveler, Jiu Wu's master, that Xia Xiong is trapped in the dimensional border and Xia Tian or Lan Ling Wang must become Zhong Ji Tie Ke Ren and open the dimensional portal before they all forget about her.
49	"Round 49"	October 15, 2007
They discover that Xia Yu is the original power-user of fire and so they needed a weapon to suppress his powers or else he would burn up the house and Xia Yu with it. Ye Si Ren finds out from his younger brother that Han is not his daughter, but simply part of his father's conspiracy. When he is about to break the news to Xia Tian and Han, she suddenly faints and hears the painful cries of Bing Xin.
50	"Round 50"	October 16, 2007
Han falls into a coma. Everyone does their best to rescue Bing Xin in order to save them both. Eventually they find out that she is trapped in a dimension called "Hei She Wu Zhi", and Xia Tian, Lan Ling Wang, Jiu Wu and Xiu enter to rescue her. However, their chance to succeed is slim.
51	"Round 51"	October 17, 2007
Because Bing Xin's demonic transformation was interrupted, she begins to die. To help Bing Xin and Lan Ling Wang spend more time together, Han borrows her life force to her for three days. Xia Mei throws a wedding ceremony for Lan Ling Wang and Bing Xin.
52	"Round 52"	October 18, 2007
Bing Xin and Lan Ling Wang say goodbye to each other. The images of Xia Xiong and her children begin to disappear one after another. Lan Ling Wang finds a dangerous way to transfer his element of lightning to Xia Tian. Jiu Wu convinces his master to help transfer his element of rain and Xia Yu's element of fire to Xia Tian.
53	"Round 53"	October 19, 2007
Xia Tian has finally collected all the five elemental powers, but during the transfer, the God of Guns came in and attacked him and left a deadly hand print on his chest. Everyone works together to find out how to make the hand print disappear before Xia Tian dies.
54	"Round 54"	October 22, 2007
The Great Traveler decides to help by using his strongest attack to break the hand print. The experiment works and Xia Tian finally becomes the legendary Zhong Ji Tie Ke Ren. But when he tries to open the dimensional portal, he ends up erupting the balance of the worlds and taking away the magic of everything. Xia Tian and the others find out that the Great Traveler is actually the God of Guns. Because of the balance disruption, the Fire Ambassador is approaching to bring end to their world.
55	"Last Final Round"	October 23, 2007
Knowing that the Fire Ambassador is approaching, everyone enjoys their last day together. Xia Tian, Lan Ling Wang, Jiu Wu, Xia Yu, Xiu, Han and the rest of Dong Cheng Wei combine their powers to fight the Fire Ambassador in an ultimate battle. The fate of the world lies in their hands.
