= The X-Family =

2007 Taiwanese drama

- Promotional poster
- Also known as: 終極一家 zhōng jí yī jiā
- Genre: School, Comedy, Fantasy, Action, Romance, Wuxia
- Created by: Qi Yang Lin
- Directed by: Zheng De Hua; Lin Qing Fang
- Starring: Pauline Lan; Jiro Wang; Calvin Chen; Aaron Yan; Chen Bo Zheng; Na Wei Xun; Danson Tang; Sunnie Huang; Chen De Xiu; Tsai Han-tsen a Chord
- Opening theme: "出神入化" (Chu Shen Ru Hua) by Fahrenheit
- Ending theme: "最愛還是你" (Zui Ai Hai Shi Ni) by Danson Tang (episodes 1-30) "不會愛" (Bu Hui Ai) by Fahrenheit (episodes 31-55)
- Country of origin: Republic of China (Taiwan)
- Original language: Mandarin
- No. of episodes: 55 (list of episodes)

Production
- Executive producers: Wang Xin Gui (王信貴), Wang Chuan Ren (王傳仁)
- Producers: Chen Zi Han (陳芷涵), Jerry Feng (馮家瑞)
- Production locations: Taipei, Taiwan
- Running time: 45 mins
- Production company: Comic International Productions

Original release
- Network: Gala Television (GTV)
- Release: 8 August – 23 October 2007

Related
- KO One; K.O.3an Guo; KO One; K.O.3an Guo; KO One Return; KO One Re-act; The X-Dormitory; Angel 'N' Devil; KO ONE: RE-MEMBER; K.O.3an Guo 2017; KO ONE: RE-CALL

The X-Family (traditional Chinese: 終極一家; simplified Chinese: 终极一家; pinyin: zhōng jí yī jiā) is a Taiwanese drama starring Pauline Lan, Jiro Wang, Danson Tang, Sunnie Huang, Calvin Chen, and Aaron Yan. It is the sequel to the 2005 drama KO One and is produced by Comic International Productions (可米國際影視事業股份有限公司). The series started filming in June 2006 and wrapped in April 2007. It was broadcast on cable TV Gala Television (GTV) Variety Show/CH 28 (八大綜合台) on August 8, 2007, to October 23, 2007.

The prequel KO One was broadcast on November 26, 2005, to May 27, 2006, and a further sequel, K.O.3an Guo, was broadcast on February 28, 2009, to February 27, 2010, on cable TV Gala Television (GTV) Variety Show/CH 28 (八大綜合台).

== Synopsis ==
There are twelve dimensions and a Mojie, a dimension where evil resides. Mojie has taken over ten dimensions in a series of showdowns between good and evil. The inter-dimensional war in the Gold dimension resulted in a tie in which both Mojie forces and KO fighters suffered great damages. Now, the story continues in the Iron dimension where the outcome has yet to be decided.

Following the loss of the KO fighters' powers in KO One, Xiu was given a mission to find the KO fighters’ alternate selves in his dimension, the Iron dimension, in order to restore their powers and turn the tide against the dark forces. His search leads him to a boy named Xia Tian, Wang Da Dong's counterpart, who has the potential to become a savior of worlds, a Zhong Ji Tie Ke Ren.

Xia Tian's incredible power is sealed away by a Feng Long Tie on his neck making him essentially a Ma Gua, or a muggle. Any attempt to use his power would awaken Gui Long, an evil entity in him. But, Gui Long is not the only obstacle Xia Tian has to overcome to become the Zhong Ji Tie Ke Ren. His family's objections and his own lack of interest in becoming the savior of worlds are also obstacles. However, his attitude begins to change after he meets a girl from his childhood, Han. To save her life, he boldly goes into Mie to recover her soul. Then and there, he realizes he needs to become stronger so he can protect his loved ones.

Although Xia Tian has the determination to become the Zhong Ji Tie Ke Ren, he must go through many more tests and trials. He is also not the only one with such potential.

== Characters ==
Xia Xiong (夏雄)

Mother of Xia Yu (夏宇), Xia Tian (夏天), and Xia Mei (夏美). Ye Si Ren's (葉思仁) ex-wife.

As the sole bread winner in the family and owner of a truck company, she takes on the roles that traditionally belonged to fathers and sons.

Despite her tough exterior, she desires the closeness and comfort of a normal family life.

She wants her children to lead normal lives, so she sealed Xia Tian and Xia Mei's powers with a pair of "Feng Long Tie" (封龍貼 / Seal Dragon Patch) since they were young. Among her 3 children, she worries about Xia Tian the most.

She loves to cook, but most people are repulsed by her cooking because she makes the worst food. The only people who enjoy her cooking are Demon Hunter, Jiu Wu and herself, which explains why she doesn't stop making food even though everybody else protests about her cooking.

She divorced Ye Si Ren because he was irresponsible as a father and unfaithful as a husband. But though her marriage fell apart years ago, she still loves Ye Si Ren and desires his company. When Ye Si Ren reveals his identity as a member of the evil Ye He Na La Family, she finally expresses her true feelings and the two of them become closer than before. But obstacles don't stop coming in-between them.

In the initial episodes, she wears a metal glove called "Qilin Shou" (麒麟手 / Qilin Glove) to cast a family spell called "Qi Lin Mai Chong Guang Tao Can" (麒麟脈衝光套餐).

Later, she uses a gun named "Wu Feng" (烏風 / Zaocys), which was given to her by the God of Guns years ago.

Xia Tian (夏天) / Gui Long (鬼龍)

Xia Tian (Summer in translation) is a sweet kid with a good heart, but he often gets taken advantage of due to his naivety. Though he is born with powerful abilities, he dislikes using them.

He dreams to follow his father's footsteps and become a guitarist, which is met with his mother's strong opposition. As the drama progresses, he convinces her to allow him to follow his dream.

To control his powerful but unstable abilities, a "Feng Long Tie" (封龍貼) was placed on his neck making him no different from a "Ma Gua" (麻瓜 / Muggle).

Xiu believes Xia Tian has the potential to become a "Zhong Ji Tie Ke Ren" (終極鐵克人/ Ultimate Iron Man), a savior of worlds, so he teaches Xia Tian how to play guitar and control Gui Long (鬼龍 / Ghostly Dragon) - his evil half with greater power, who on several occasions, attempts to destroy Xia Tian in order to become the dominant personality.

His biggest motivation for developing his power and guitar skills is Han, a girl that he met when he was a child and has liked her ever since.

When he takes off the Feng Long Tie, he transforms into Gui Long and becomes unable to control his actions. Gui Long's main weapon is a guitar pick called "Gui Long Pi Ke" (鬼龍鎞克 / Gui Long Guitar Pick).

Lan Ling Wang (蘭陵王)

Lan Ling Wang was once a highly trained soldier and commander for the Ye He Na La family. His clothing is almost an exact duplicate to the Final Fantasy VII character, Cloud Strife. His lifestyle is pretty retro.

When Lan Ling Wang first appears in the story, he just appears and disappears around the Xia family and Dong Cheng Wei (東城衛). He was ordered to find "Sou Hun Qu" (蒐魂曲 / Soul Collecting Melody) and "Xi Hun Qu" (洗魂曲 / Soul Cleansing Melody).

His family was killed when he softened to the Xia Lan Xing De family and he tried to take revenge on the killer, but his powers were drained by a "Gui Ling Yan Huo Qiu" (鬼靈焰火球 / Ghostly Fireball) and becomes a Ma Gua (麻瓜) for a time throughout the series, until the Master of the Ye He Na La family executes his plan to dominate the world. Lan Ling Wang casts an ancient spell to ruin his plan, which results in the restoration of the Ye Ha Na La family's power and his powers.

When Lan Ling Wang first lost his powers, he learned that someone had put a "Qi Xin Zhou" (七星咒 / Seven Stars Curse) on his family six generations ago. If he, the seventh generation, cannot lift the curse before the eighth generation is born, then the following generations will lose their true powers and become slaves of the Ye He Na La Family forever. However, if he can lift it, he will gather up the energy of hatred that his ancestors have collected over the centuries and turn him into a "Zhong Ji Tie Ke Ren" (終極鐵克人 / Ultimate Iron Man).

Lan Ling Wang carries a sword from the spiritual realm known as "Lan Ling Zhan" (攔靈斬). It can gather the destructive energy and produce a powerful blast called "Fen Jian Da Fa" (弅劍大法), which can eliminate everything within 100 miles, including himself.

Jiu Wu (灸舞)

Jiu Wu (sounds like ninety-five) is the newly ascended ruler of the Iron Dimension. An organization called Tie Ke Jin Wei Jun (鐵克禁衛軍 / The Iron Imperial Army) is under his control to protect the Iron Dimension.

When he first appears, he has a deep, strange voice which makes him seem powerful and out of the ordinary. But after about twelve episodes, his powerful voice returned to a normal one.

He has a younger brother named Jiu Lai, who has the appearance of an old man due to his misuse of supernatural powers. Because he rarely reveals himself, people that know his brother assume that their appearances and ages would be alike; some even refer their names to be similar.

As the ruler, his main responsibility is to preserve "Fang Hu Ci Chang" (防護磁場 / Defense Magnetic Shield) that protects their world from outside attacks: if he gets hurt, the shield will weaken, allowing evil to invade their world; but as he keeps on preserving the force field, it also weakens him in the process, making him unable to use his powers under certain circumstances.

Jiu Wu has been famous since young for his "Jiu Bu Qin Gui Shou" (九步擒鬼手), which indicates the ability to find the opponent's Achilles' Heel within nine steps. No one has ever escaped this attack until he meets the father of the Ye He Na La Family.

Xia Liu (夏流)

The playful grandfather of Xia Tian (夏天), Xia Yu (夏宇) and Xia Mei (夏美); and the head of the family.

Xia Liu (because his name sounds like "pervert" (下流), his name is often dragged into that theme) literally sleeps under the house as the entrance to his bedroom is located under the living room table. Xia Liu is the guardian of the entrance to the ghostly dimension, Mie (滅). He may be senile, but he is also the most powerful member in the family: that is before Xia Tian becomes the superior member. His poor memory is often a laughing point.

Removing people's memories is one of Xia Liu's many abilities, and is the first one to be used on screen.

His main weapon is a pair of cymbals called "Ke Mo Ba" (剋魔鈸), which he uses to attack with sound waves and to cast spells. His most notable attacks are eight spells that are mainly used for fighting evils, called "Xiang Mo Ba Jue" (降魔八訣).

Ye Si Ren (葉思仁)

Ex-husband of Xia Xiong (夏雄), and father of Xia Tian (夏天), Xia Yu (夏宇) and Xia Mei (夏美).

Ye Si Ren (sounds close to "死人" / Dead Man) owns a pub called "The Ass Pub" (老屁股) and is a very gifted musician.

Because of his naïvety and unfaithfulness, he and Xia Xiong's marriage ended years ago, but he still has feelings for her. He is constantly interfering with Xia Xiong's dates. Even though he was not a very good husband, he is a very good father, and will do anything in his capacity to protect his family.

At the start, he appears as a Ma Gua (麻瓜), but when Xia Yu's dark powers begin to manifest, he reveals himself as the head member of the Ye He Na La family (葉赫那啦家族) and plays the Xi Hun Qu (洗魂曲 / Soul Cleansing Melody) in order to cleanse Xia Yu's evil instincts and powers.

Xia Yu (夏宇) / Gui Feng (鬼鳳)

Xia Yu is the eldest child. He rarely worries his mother. As a student majoring in law and finance at National Taiwan University, he is great with money and handles the family budget. He is also a money-lover. He always cooks and takes care of his younger siblings during his mother's absence.

Despite being the person everyone trusts and relies on, he resents being the only "Ma Gua" (麻瓜) in the family and doing the menial jobs around the home.

Evil sees his jealousy and uses that to turn him evil by giving him a ring to absorb other people's powers. The ring unwittingly unlocks Xia Yu's sealed power. As it turns out, he is not a Ma Gua by birth. Rather, his father secretly sealed his power upon birth because he exhibited the pure evil genes. When he fully comes into his powers, his dark instincts start to take over. The situation forces his father to use "Xi Hun Qu" (洗魂曲 / Soul Cleansing Melody) to cleanse his soul and seal his power again, which they remain until his paternal grandfather's plan of world domination backfires causing a beam of dark energy to strike directly at him, turning him into "Gui Feng" (鬼鳳 / Ghostly Phoenix).

Xia Mei (夏美) / Gui Wa (鬼娃)

The youngest child and only daughter of Xia Xiong and Ye Si Ren. Despite being born in a powerful magic family, Xia Mei is the only base-levelled power-user, which makes her the least powerful member in the family. Nevertheless, she is strongest among lower-level power-users.

Initially, she has a crush on Xiu, the guitarist of Dong Cheng Wei (東城衛), but later falls for Lan Ling Wang. She is so obsessed with Lan Ling Wang and is willing to sacrifice anything for him.

By partially ripping off her Feng Long Tie (封龍貼), Xia Mei can use her power of electricity to attack people; Ren Chen Wen often falls victim to her attacks. However, since her powers belong to basic level, she cannot do any serious damage.

When she rips off her Feng Long Tie completely, she becomes Gui Wa (鬼娃 / Ghostly Doll), and becomes able to scare people with Zhen Zi (貞子 - a demon from the movie "The Ring"), a ghost-like demon with pale skin and a green glow, which she conjures with a little puppet that appears along when she transforms.

Xiu (脩)

Xiu is the leader and guitarist in the band, Dong Cheng Wei (東城衛).

At first he thought that Xia Tian was just a Ma Gua (麻瓜), but when he sensed his special powers he started suspecting that Xia Tian might have the potential to become the legendary Zhong Ji Tie Ke Ren (終極鐵克人), so he becomes Xia Tian's guitar teacher and later trainer.

Xiu has the ability to force someone to act according to his commands, a spell that every member in his family, the Hu Yan Jue Luo family, is capable of.

His special weapon is a guitar pick called "Shen Feng Pi Ke" (神風鎞克 / God's Wind Guitar Pick), which allows its master to increase his magical abilities and produce healing energy.

Han (寒)

Han is the girl Xia Tian met and saved from a gang of naughty kids when she was young. She then gave him her hairpin as a gift, and the two became friends. After her mom died, she was abducted by evil power-users. Xia Tian thought she moved away.

Years later, Han reappears when Xia Tian and his father are attacked by loan sharks and unwittingly rescues them (although she does hit Xia Tian on the head).

He recognizes her as soon as he sees the picture that he took with her and her mom on the same day he rescued her. However, she had completely forgotten about her friendship with Xia Tian along with everything else that happened before she was kidnapped.

Han has the power to read one's mind. Her primary weapon is a pair of drumsticks known as "Jing Lei" (驚雷 / Frightening Thunder) which she has transferred her soul in order to make them both powerful and spiritual.

a Chord

a Chord used to be the lead singer of the band Dong Cheng Wei (東城衛). He is somewhat of a funny guy, who does not know the appropriate time to talk.

a Chord's primary weapon is a tuning fork called the "Gui Zhan Yin Cha" (鬼戰音叉), which he uses to attack with sound waves.

== Yi Neng Families ==
The Xia Lan Xing De Family (夏蘭荇德家族)

A family of powerful warriors, who carry the responsibilities to protect the Feng Long Ka, a family heirloom that holds the secret of Zhong Ji Tie Ke Ren (Ultimate Iron Man). The eldest family member also guards the entrance to the ghostly dimension Mie, a dimension where spirits and demons prevail. It is one of the most reputable families in the Iron Dimension.

Members:
Xia Liu (夏流)
Xia Xiong (夏雄)
Xia Yu (夏宇), Xia Tian (夏天) and Xia Mei (夏美)
Dead members:
Two unnamed ancestors (兩個無名祖先)

The Ye He Na La Family (葉赫那啦家族)

Centuries ago, it was just an ordinary family with special powers. But they surrendered to the darkness and eventually became a dark family. Their goal is to steal the Feng Long Ka from the Xia Lan Xing De family. To prevent their descendants from becoming demons, the ancestors of Ye He Na La created Zhen Mo San Bu Qu (鎮魔三部曲 / The Demon Suppressing Symphony) that can help their descendants get rid of their evil nature - the Soul Collecting Melody (蒐魂曲), the Soul Cleansing Melody (洗魂曲) and the Soul Calming Melody (安魂曲). Near the end of the story, this family's power is destroyed and all the remaining members are scattered.

Members:
Ye Si Ren (葉思仁) & Ye Si Si (葉思思)
Xia Yu (夏宇), Xia Tian (夏天) and Xia Mei (夏美)
Dead members:
Ye He Na La Teng (葉赫那拉 腾)
Ye He Na La Xiong Ba (葉赫那啦 雄霸)

The Hu Yan Jue Luo Family (呼延覺羅家族)

A family of powerful warriors who use musical instruments as weapons. All the family members specialise in She Xin Shu (攝心術), a spell that controls a person. Because they used to be very similar to the Han Ke La Ma family, many generations in these families joined in marriage until one of these generations caused a genetic hatred, which was passed on to the later generations. However, in the recent generation, they have learned to overcome that family hatred and become friends again. The members of this family are known as the assistants and protectors of the legendary Zhong Ji Tie Ke Ren (終極鐵克人).

Members:
Vincent
Xiu (脩)
Dead members:
Hu Yan Jue Luo Tie Le Shi (呼延覺羅鐵勒士)
Hu Yan Jue Luo Huan (呼延覺羅 喚)

The Han Ke La Ma Family (韓克拉瑪家族)

A family of powerful female warriors who also use musical instruments as weapons, in which they put their souls: this is their strongest and weakest point. The Han Ke La Ma family's members all specialize in Rei De You Mai En (蕊德尤邁恩 / Read Your Mind), a spell that allows them to read a person's mind by touching them and saying out the spell. Because they used to be very similar to the Hu Yan Jue Luo family, many generations in these families joined in marriage until one of these generations caused a genetic hatred, which was passed on to the later generations. However, in the recent generation, they have learned to overcome that family hatred and become friends again.

Members:
Han (寒)
Dead members:
Han Ke La Ma Mian Mian Bing (韓克拉瑪 綿綿冰)
Han Ke La Ma Nana (韓克拉瑪 那那)
Bing Xin (冰心)

The Gu La Yi Er Family (古拉依爾家族)

This family has sworn to serve the Ye He Na La family for eternity. Centuries ago, a curse was put upon them, and if the seventh generation cannot find a way to lift the curse, then the following generations will never be able to receive their family's powers and will be forever controlled by the Ye He Na La family. This family has almost been eliminated, with Lan Ling Wang as the sole remaining descendant.

Members:
Lan Ling Wang (蘭陵王)
Dead members:
Gu La Yi Er Zhou Wang (古拉依爾 宙王)

The Jiu Da Zhang Lao Family (灸亣镸荖家族)

A family of powerful warriors who have served the protection of the Iron Dimension for a long time. Though powerful, its members lived short lives.

Members:
Jiu Wu (灸舞) and Jiu Lai (灸萊)
Dead members:
Jiu Da Zhang Lao Pa Lai (灸亣镸荖 帕萊)

The Ren Ren Wan Nong Family (任秂完弄家族)

A family with lower level magic. These family members are good at finding people.

Members:
Ren Ren Wan Nong cheng wen )(任 ren wan nong cheng wen
Dead members:Ren Ren Wan Nong Wo Xing 任秂完弄 我行)

The Mei Shan Lu Yong Family (槑珊麓苚 家族)

A family with lower level magic.

Members:
Xia Mi (瞎祕) and Wa Ge (蛙哥)

== Others ==
The Tie Ke Jin Wei Jun (鐵克禁衛軍)
Also known as "the Iron Imperial Army," this organization works together to maintain the safety of the Iron Dimension and at the same time serve as the society of the magical world. The organization consists of 4 bands - Dong Cheng Wei (東城衛), Nan Cheng Wei (南城衛), Xi Cheng Wei (西城衛) and Bei Cheng Wei (北城衛). They work together with the Meng Zhu (盟主 / Ruler) to maintain the safety of the Iron Dimension. Dong Cheng Wei is the Main Band of the Tie Ke Jin Wei Jun (鐵克禁衛軍).
Members:
Jiu Wu (灸舞), Xiu (脩), Xia Tian (夏天), a Chord, Deng (鐙), Ming (冥) and Jie (戒).

== Spells ==
- 坎綽勱脬佤 CONTROL MY POWER 嗚啦巴哈 → 鬼控術: Helps someone control a power that cannot be controlled. This spell can sometimes be referred to as an ability. This spell has been used by Xia Tian (夏天) and Xia Yu (夏宇).
- 離之咒 CRUMBLE 嗚拉巴哈 → 使萬物歸於原始狀態: Disrupts 回之咒 and takes away the energy from the one who cast 回之咒. This spell can only be cast on a specific day at a specific time. It is this spell that restored Lan Ling Wang's powers as well as making Xia Yu come into his own. This spell has been used by Lan Ling Wang (蘭陵王).
- 氏腮缹 DECIPHER 嗚啦巴哈 → 異能破解術: Shields the user from the spell to be controlled by others. This spell has been used by Han (寒).
- 伊蕊斯蕊外 ERASE REWIND 嗚啦巴哈 → 倒帶刪除術: Erases the memories of the target. This spell has been used by Xia Liu (夏流).
- 飛映殤德 FILL IN THUNDER 嗚啦巴哈 → 連擊式雷擊術: Enables the user to attack with powerful thunder or fight in lightning speed. This spell has been used by Han (寒).
- 伏擂姆殤德 FLAM THUNDER 嗚啦巴哈 → 裝點式雷擊術: Shoots a beam of thunder energy out of the user's weapon. This spell has been used by Han (寒).
- 芣恪廝 FOCUS 嗚啦巴哈 → 專注術: Amplifies the target's ability to focus. This spell has been used by Xiu (脩), Jiu Wu (灸舞), Jiu Lai (灸萊) and Demon Hunter (斬魔獵士).
- 伏瑞斯 FREEZE 嗚啦巴哈 → 凝結術: Immobilizes the target's motions. Of all the spells throughout the series, this is the one that has been used the most. This spell has been used by Xia Xiong (夏雄), Xiu (脩), Xia Liu (夏流), a Chord, Xia Tian (夏天) and an invisible demon.
- 馬賽克 MOSAIC 嗚啦巴哈 → 馬賽克氣場盾: Creates a mosaic around the user's face. It is notably the least useful power. This spell has been used by Ren Chen Wen (任晨文) and Xia Yu (夏宇).
- 謬特 MUTE 嗚啦巴哈 → 靜音術: Makes the target unable to speak. This spell has been used by Xia Xiong (夏雄), Xia Liu (夏流) and Xia Tian (夏天).
- 派喇笛多殤德 PARADIDDLE THUNDER 嗚啦巴哈 → 重點式雷擊術: Creates a powerful energy that attacks with thunder. This spell has been used by Han (寒).
- 蕊德尤邁恩 READ U MIND 嗚啦巴哈 → 讀心術: Allows the user to read his/her target's mind. This spell has been used by Han (寒).
- 蕊力ㄈ RELIEF 嗚啦巴哈 → 解除術: Reverses all spells. This spell has been used by Xia Xiong (夏雄), Xiu (脩), Xia Liu (夏流) and Xia Yu (夏宇).
- 蕊辟特 REPEAT 嗚啦巴哈 → 重複術: Makes the target repeat its actions. This spell has been used by Xia Xiong (夏雄) and Xia Yu (夏宇).
- 銷爾特 SHELTER 嗚啦巴哈 → 氣場防護罩: Creates a shield around the user. This spell has been used by Xia Mei (夏美) and Xiu (脩) in K.O.3an Guo.
- 斯羅摩迅 SLOW MOTION 嗚啦巴哈 → 慢動作術: Makes the target move in slow motion. This spell has been used by Xia Xiong (夏雄) and Xia Liu (夏流).
- 沙氪瘖 SUCK IN 嗚啦巴哈 → 驅動魔借吸取異能: Allows the user to suck powers out of other people. This spell has been used by Xia Yu (夏宇).
- 殤德雷霆 THUNDER LIGHTING 嗚啦巴哈 → 急電術: Allows the user to attack with electricity. If the user's powers aren't strong enough, this spell will not be able to kill the target. This spell has been used by Xia Mei (夏美).
- 樁緦芣 TRANSFER 嗚啦巴哈 → 異能轉移術: Allows the user to transfer his/her powers to someone else, but if this spell is used, the person will die once the powers are transferred. This spell has not been used.
- 威伏點. ZIP → WAVE.ZIP 壓縮傳音術: Allows the speaker to speak in fast speed and for the listeners to be able to understand. Wu La Ba Ha is not required in this spell. This spell has been used by Xiu (脩), Master of the Ye family (老掌門) and Xia Tian (夏天). Wang Da Dong (汪大東) used this spell in K.O.3an Guo.
- 降魔訣第一訣 → 北嗑土海洏 BACK TO HELL 嗚啦巴哈: (驅魔訣) Fends off the evil that attempts to attack. This spell has been used by Xia Liu (夏流).
- 降魔訣第二訣 → 鍶夸浀泆缹 SQUELCH EVIL 嗚啦巴哈: (鎮魔訣) Paralyzes the target. This spell has been used by Xia Liu (夏流).
- 降魔訣第三訣 → 合臻圍伏 HERTZIAN WAVES 嗚啦巴哈: (拘魔訣) A capturing spell used against evil. Most notable for making the target unable to fight. This spell has been used by Xia Liu (夏流).
- 降魔訣第四訣: (劀魔訣) One of Xia Liu's spells created to fight evils. This spell has not been used.
- 降魔訣第五訣: (磔魔訣) One of Xia Liu's spells created to fight evils. This spell has not been used.
- 降魔訣第六訣: (劈魔訣) One of Xia Liu's spells created to fight evils. This spell has not been used.
- 降魔訣第七訣: (裂魔訣) One of Xia Liu's spells created to fight evils. This spell has not been used.
- 降魔訣第八訣: (與魔共毀訣) One of Xia Liu's spells that is created to fight evils. Of all eight spells, this is the most dangerous as it is capable of killing the opponent and the caster himself. This spell has not been used.
- 麒麟脈衝光套餐 → 一號餐分光套餐嗚啦巴哈: Used with the Qilin Glove (麒麟手) to create beam of light. This spell has been used by Xia Xiong (夏雄).
- 麒麟脈衝光套餐 → 二號餐散光套餐嗚啦巴哈: One of Xia Xiong's special spells used with the Qilin Glove (麒麟手). This spell has not been used.
- 麒麟脈衝光套餐 → 三號餐聚光套餐 嗚拉巴哈: Attacks with a light bolt formed by the Qilin Glove (麒麟手). This spell is used by Xia Xiong (夏雄).
- 麒麟脈衝光套餐 → 四號餐束光套餐嗚啦巴哈: One of Xia Xiong's special spells used with the Qilin Glove (麒麟手). This spell has not been used.
- 麒麟脈衝光套餐 → 五號餐疾光套餐嗚啦巴哈: One of Xia Xiong's special spells used with the Qilin Glove (麒麟手). This spell has not been used.
- 麒麟脈衝光套餐 → 六號餐銀光套餐嗚啦巴哈: One of Xia Xiong's special spells used with the Qilin Glove (麒麟手). This spell has not been used.
- 麒麟脈衝光套餐 → 七號餐瞬光套餐嗚啦巴哈: One of Xia Xiong's special spells used with the Qilin Glove (麒麟手). This spell has not been used.
- 麒麟脈衝光套餐 → 八號餐銀光套餐嗚啦巴哈: One of Xia Xiong's special spells used with the Qilin Glove (麒麟手). This spell has not been used.
- 麒麟脈衝光套餐 → 九號餐星光套餐嗚啦巴哈: One of Xia Xiong's special spells used with the Qilin Glove (麒麟手). This spell has not been used.
- 麒麟脈衝光套餐 → 十號餐悲光套餐嗚啦巴哈: One of Xia Xiong's special spells used with the Qilin Glove (麒麟手). This spell has not been used.
- 夏蘭荇德家族脈衝光套餐全家餐 嗚啦巴哈: Creates an attacking and defending force field combined with the entire family's powers and the Qilin Glove (麒麟手). This spell has been used by Xia Xiong (夏雄), Xia Liu (夏流), Xia Mei (夏美) and Xia Tian (夏天).
- 夏蘭荇德家族脈衝光套餐組合餐 嗚啦巴哈: Creates a defensive and offensive force field in combination with family members, other power-users and the Qilin Glove (麒麟手). This spell has been used by Xia Xiong (夏雄), Xia Tian (夏天), Xia Liu (夏流) and Xia Mei (夏美).
- 問候令尊令堂祖宗八代下流找人術: Allows a group of casters to summon its target by speaking its ancient language. If the first part of the spell does not work, then a language of profane manners is required. Wu La Ba Ha is not required in this spell. This spell has been used by Xia Liu (夏流), Xia Xiong (夏雄), Xia Yu (夏宇), Xia Tian (夏天) and Xia Mei (夏美).
- 縱鶴擒龍嗚啦巴哈 → 縱鶴擒龍術: Creates a hand of energy claws to attack. This spell has been used by Xiu (脩); it is his most powerful attacking spell.
- 攝心術嗚啦巴哈: Forces the target to do the user's bidding without being able to fight back. This spell has been used by Xiu (脩); and once by Xia Yu (夏宇). While Xiu needs to say the spell out loud Xia Yu manages to cast it without saying the words out loud.
- 變種 RH 陰性攝心術: An evil version of She Xin Shu (攝心術) that forces the target to do the user's bidding without being able to fight back. This spell has been used by Vincent.
- 夏蘭荇德家族祖傳 噩運咒 (ba le ba the wu lu wu): A bad luck bringing spell. This curse cannot be relieved by the person who got cursed, someone else have to help him/her to relief the spell. Wu La Ba Ha is not required in this spell. This spell has been used by Xia Liu (夏流).
- 回之咒 嗚拉巴哈 → 父召子咒: A powerful spell used by evil power-users. It is known for transferring enormous energy to the caster, but it has to be performed in a specific ritual to be able to do so. This spell has been used by the Master of the Ye He Na La family (老掌門).
- 混元無極: The ultimate spell cast by Zhong Ji Tie Ke Ren in combination with the original power-users and others. Wu La Ba Ha is not required. This spell has been used by Xia Tian (夏天), Xiu (脩), Xia Yu (夏宇), Han (寒), Lan Ling Wang (蘭陵王), Jiu Wu (灸舞) and the rest of Dong Cheng Wei.

== Cast and Production Credits ==
=== Cast ===
Characters	Ma Gua Name	Actor
Xia Lan Xing De Xiong (夏蘭荇德 雄); Xia Lan Xing De ancestor (夏蘭荇德祖先)	Xia Xiong (夏雄) none	Pauline Lan (藍心湄)
Xia Lan Xing De Tian (夏蘭荇德 天); Gui Long (鬼龍); Wang Da Dong (汪大東); Zack; Himself	Xia Tian (夏天) none none none none	Jiro Wang (汪東城)
Ye He Na La Si Ren (葉赫那啦 思仁); Duan Chang Ren (斷腸人); Hei Long (黑龍); Himself	Ye Si Ren (葉思仁) none none none	Na Wei Xun (那維勲)
Xia Lan Xing De Liu (夏蘭荇德 流); Xia Lan Xing De ancestor (夏蘭荇德祖先)	Xia Liu (夏流) none	Chen Bor-jeng (陳博正)
Xia Lan Xing De Yu (夏蘭荇德 宇); Gui Feng (鬼鳳); Himself	Xia Yu (夏宇) none none	Danson Tang (唐禹哲)
Xia Lan Xing De Mei (夏蘭荇德 美); Gui Wa (鬼娃); Herself	Xia Mei (夏美) none none	Sunnie Huang (黃小柔)
Gu La Yi Er Lan Ling Wang (古拉依爾 蘭陵王); Wang Ya Se (王亞瑟)	Lan Ling Wang (蘭陵王) none	Calvin Chen (辰亦儒)
Jiu Da Zhang Lao Wu (灸亣镸荖 舞); Ding Xiao Yu (丁小雨)	Jiu Wu (灸舞) none	Aaron Yan (炎亞綸)
Hu Yan Jue Lo Xiu (呼延覺羅 脩); Hu Yan Jue Luo Tie Er Shi (呼延覺羅鐵勒士)	Hu Yan Xiu (呼延脩) none	Shu Chen (陳德修)
Han Ke La Ma Han (韓克拉瑪 寒); Han Ke La Ma Bing Xin (韓克拉瑪 冰心); Han Ke La Ma Min Min Bing (韓克拉瑪 綿綿冰)	Han (寒); Bing Xin (冰心) none	Tsai Han-tsen (蔡函岑)
a Chord	none	a Chord (謝和弦)
The Great Traveler (神行者); The God of Guns (槍靈王)	none none	George Hu (胡宇崴)
The Fire Ambassador (火焰使者)	none	Wu Chun (吳尊)
Ren Ren Wan Nong Chen Wen (任秂完弄 晨文)	Ren Chen Wen (任晨文)	Zhang Hao Ming (張皓明)
Mei San Lu Long Xia Mi (槑珊麓苚 瞎祕)	Xia Mi (瞎祕)	Lu Jian Yu (陸建宇/小辣)
Mei San Lu Long Wa Ge (槑珊麓苚 蛙哥)	Wa Ge (蛙哥)	Ah Mai Er (阿脈兒)
Jiu Da Zhang Lao Lai (灸亣镸荖 萊)	Jiu Lai (灸萊)	Lin Yi Xun (林奕勳)
Ye He Na La Xiong Ba (葉赫那啦 雄霸)	The Master (老掌門)	Wang Dao (王道)
Ye He Na La Si Si (葉赫那啦 思思)	Ye Si Si (葉思思)	Li Jie Sheng (李傑聖)

Characters	Actor
Professor G	Renzo Liu (劉亮佐)
Xiao Long Nu (小聾女)	Qiu Er (球兒)
Guo Er (過兒)	Li Ang Lin (利昂霖)
Demon Hunter (斬魔獵士)	Xia Jing Ting (夏靖庭)
Doctor Xia Gu (黠谷醫仙)	Xue Zhi Zheng (薛志正)
Xia Gu Rou Qing (黠谷柔情)	Huang Wan Ting (皇琬婷/婉兒)
Bing Dao (兵刀)	Chien Te-men(乾德門)
Fire Ant Girl (火蟻女)	Wang Qiao Zheng (王巧埩)
Vincent	Den Cheng Ju (單承矩)
Dao Ba Jie Sen (刀疤傑森)	Huang Wan Bo (黃萬伯/K一吧)
Faceless Peace (無臉和平)	De Yang (德楊)
Dong Cheng Wei-Deng (東城衛-鐙)	Deng Hua Dun (鄧樺敦)
Dong Cheng Wei-Ming (東城衛-冥)	Li Ming Han (李明翰)
Dong Cheng Wei-Jie (東城衛-戒)	Michael Chen (陳志介)
Shi Ba Tong Ren (十八捅人)	Li Bing Yi (李秉億)
Amazing Little Nurse (神奇小護士)	Chang Ai Wen (常愛芠/愛兒)
The Messenger (信哥); Gu La Yi Er Zhou Wang (古拉依爾 宙王)	Jian Han Zhong (簡翰忠)
Li Da Xiong (李大雄)	Li Guo Chao (李國超)
Comic book store owner	Cai Ba (蔡爸)
Zhen Zi (貞子)	Ni Pei Wei (倪裴薇)
Scriptwriter A	Ye Hui Zhi (葉惠芝)
Scriptwriter B	Hong Qi Yang (洪綺陽)
Loyal servant (忠僕)	Lin Shu Hong (林書弘)
Ah Fei (阿飛)	Zhang Zhi Wei (張志偉)
Han's mother (寒媽)	Zhang Yi Lin (張以琳)
Gangster boss (流氓老大)	Wu Zhen Ya (吳震亞)
Gangster	Chen Jun Hui (陳俊輝)
Gangster	Liu Guo Shao (劉國卲)
Gangster	Hong Wei Xin (洪維信)
Bartender	Wu Feng Qing (吳豐卿)
Little Xia Yu (小夏宇)	Wu Yan Xuan (吳彥諠)
Little Xia Tian (小夏天)	Xiang Bo Tao (相博濤)
Little Xia Mei (小夏美)	Xu Qiong Yun (許瓊云)
Little Han (小寒)	Xu Yu Ling (許育菱)
Little Dao Ba Jie Sen (小刀疤傑森)	Lin Yi Cheng (林奕丞)

=== Production ===
Producers	Chen Zi Han (陳芷涵); Jerry Feng (馮家瑞); Wang Xin Gui (王信貴); Wang Chuan Ren (王傳仁)
Directors	Zheng De Hua (鄭德華); Lin Qing Fang (林清芳); Liao Fei Hong (廫猆鴻); Liu Xing (劉行)
Screenwriters	Qi Yang Lin (齊鍚麟); Liu Shi Yuan (呂蒔媛); Deng Li Fen (鄧莉芬); Lin Xin Hui (林欣慧); Liu Rue Xuan (劉蕊瑄); Huang Wei Rong (黃微容)

== Multimedia ==
- X Online (https://web.archive.org/web/20090810044701/http://ko.gameflier.com/)
- The X-Family: Original TV Soundtrack - August 31, 2007
- The X-Family: Behind the Scene - August 2007
- The X-Family: TV Novel - August 2007
- The X-Family: Cards and envelopes - August 22, 2007
- The X-Family: Transparent cards - August 25, 2007
- The X-Family: Stickers - August 25, 2007
- The X-Family: Bookmarks - August 25, 2007

== See also ==
- KO One
- KO One (soundtrack)
- The X-Family (soundtrack)
- K.O.3an Guo

== Notes ==
=== Making of The X-Family ===
Although, The X-Family had a strong sci-fi/ fantasy feel, the production crew viewed it as a futuristic wuxia film. Their goal was to show the way wuxia would be when it's in the present day and in the future. In the first episode they paid homage to the wuxia genre by having Xiu transfer his energy to the KO Fighters in an effort to restore their powers. This "transferring of energy" to help others is a recurring theme in The X-Family.

While working on this show, the writing team made a conscious effort to continue the comic book theme from KO One, as well as to incorporate video game elements popular with their teenage viewers. To do this, they gave almost all their Iron Dimension characters special powers and weapons that were more powerful than their Gold Dimension counterparts. For example, Lan Ling Wang has "Lan Ling Zhan," a huge sword that can obliterate a city block when his entire life force is channeled into it. While, his Gold Dimension counterpart Wang Ya Se has "Shi Zhong Jian," a little sword in a rock, that merely enhances his fighting power. To show the effects of different powers and weapons, special effects were used, which tagged on additional filming and post-production time. As result, it took eight months, from September 2006 to April 2007, to finish shooting this show.

The plot may be unrealistic, but the characters are partly based on the actors and actresses who portray them. In the show, Dong Cheng Wei (東城衛) is a unit of the Iron Protection Team that protects the Iron Dimension with its music. In real life, Dong Cheng Wei is a rock band started by Chen De Xiu and Jiro Wang back when they were in high school. Xiu is a current member of this band; Jiro is both a member of this band as well as Fahrenheit.

Also, the actors make references by casually talking about how to act a certain way, use scriptwriting threats, and the production team. This is used for a subtle humour tactic in the story.

=== Controversy ===
Days before its airing date, a wave of opposition against the show played out on the net. Taiwanese netizens pointed out the costume for the character Lan Ling Wang had a high degree of similarity to the character Cloud Strife in Final Fantasy VII and blasted the network for its blatant copyright violation. Executive producer Wang Xin Gui was dismayed by the accusation and denied its validity.

Netizens were dissatisfied by the producer's answer and proceeded to send petitions to boycott the show. The producer responded by issuing a public apology through Comic International Productions Co., Ltd, and stated that they were in the process of negotiating with Square Enix about intellectual property rights. It also stated the similarity between Lan Ling Wang and Cloud Strife was purely coincidental. As result of the uproar, HIM International Music postponed the original soundtrack release date due to its CD album had contained images involved in the copyright dispute. The show and its companion books were released as scheduled.

== Follow-ups ==
=== K.O.3an Guo ===
A third installment titled, K.O.3an Guo (終極三國) was broadcast on 28 February 2009 to 27 February 2010, on cable TV Gala Television (GTV) Variety Show/CH 28 (八大綜合台) and Formosa Television (FTV) (民視) for 53 episodes.

It starred George Hu and other members of Wu Hu Jiang, Chen De Xiu and Kirsten Ren, the little sister of Selina from S.H.E. Jiro Wang, Calvin Chen and Aaron Yan from Fahrenheit appeared as guests stars.
