= Hsieh Ho-hsien =

Taiwanese actor and singer

R.Chord
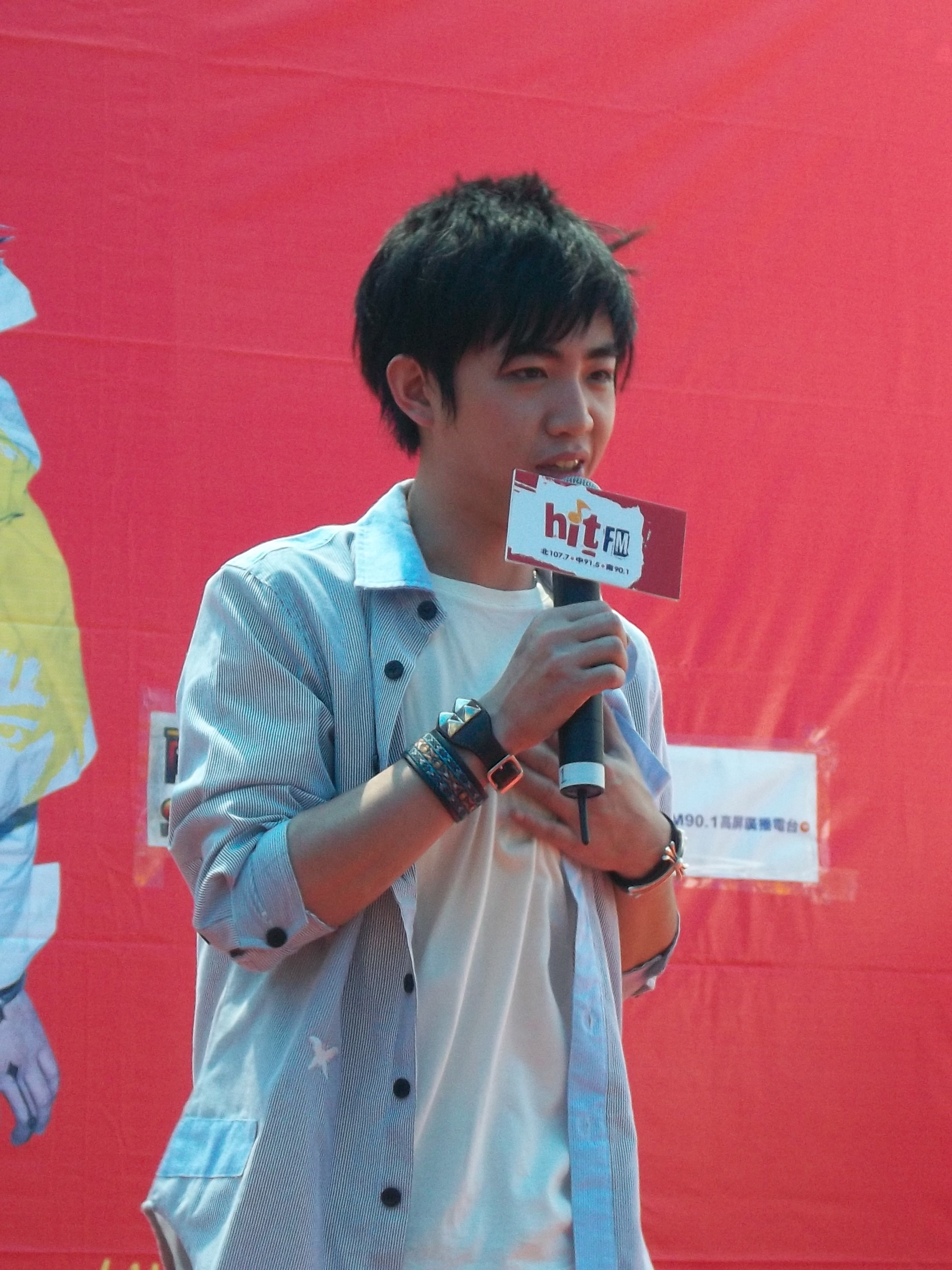
- Born: 15 April 1987 (age 39); Puli, Nantou, Taiwan
- Occupations: Actor, songwriter, singer
- Spouses: Keanna Taiyh (m. 2016; div. 2020); Liya (m. 2021)
- Children: 1

Chinese name
- Traditional Chinese: 謝和弦
- Simplified Chinese: 谢和弦
Transcriptions
Standard Mandarin
- Hanyu Pinyin: Xiè Héxián
Southern Min
- Hokkien POJ: Siā Hô-hiân
- Musical career
- Also known as: R. Chord
- Origin: Taiwan (Taiwan)
- Genres: Mandopop, Taiwanese Hokkien pop
- Instrument: guitar
- Labels: Asia Muse Entertainment Group (2009–2012); Warner Music Group (2014–2019)

Hsieh Ho-hsien (known professionally as R.Chord, and sometimes R.Chord; born 15 April 1987) is a Taiwanese singer and actor. R.Chord is known mainly for writing the lyrics of the song, "Gou Ai," which was played on the Taiwanese drama, The X-Family. "Gou Ai" was also performed on K.O.3an Guo by Pets Tseng. The song has also been parodied multiple times on K.O.3an Guo.

== Biography ==
R.Chord was named Ho-hsien (和弦), meaning "chord," by his grandfather. R.Chord started to play the guitar at a very young age due to the influence of his grandfather, who he looked up to as a role model.

By the year 2004, aged 16, R.Chord had composed around 50–60 songs and won a songwriting competition. He attended Guess Guess Guess during the competition period, and was favourably received by the audience. The prize was a contract with HIM International Music, but R.Chord did not take up the offer of the contract and instead, went to play underground music with his band, SEA-LEVEL (海平面).

== Media Career ==
=== Acting career ===
R.Chord made his first acting debut in KO One as Shayu (鯊魚), following up with many other appearances in other Taiwanese dramas, notably as his character, R.Chord in Taiwanese drama The X-Family, in which he appeared as a person with supernatural powers tasked with the responsibility of protecting the Dimension. He then played the character Dashu (大樹) in Hanazakarino Kimitachihe in the year 2006.

=== Songwriting career ===
R.Chord has composed many songs for Taiwanese dramas such as KO One's "Zhōngjí yī bān" (終極一班), where he helped to write the lyrics such as, "Gou Ai" (夠愛) from The X-Family (2007), and recently, "Nǐ céngjīng ràng wǒ xīndòng" (你曾經讓我心動) from They Kiss Again (2007).

He has also helped Danson Tang write the song "Zhǐ qiàn yījù wǒ ài nǐ" (只欠一句我愛你) in Danson's 1st debut album, Ai Wo (愛我).

He has recently recorded more songs such as "Duì nǐ ài bù wán" (對你愛不完) and "Guòláirén" (過來人).

== Political career ==
In 2022, R.Chord contested for a seat on the Taipei City Council representing the Zhongzheng and Wanhua constituency during the 2022 Taiwanese local elections. His campaign platform, “Wanhua’s Three Chords” (萬華三和弦), was a reference to his name and consisted of three objectives: legalize marijuana, open a legal red light district, and legalize modified vehicles on Taipei city streets.

== Discography ==
=== Albums ===
- (2009.02) R.Chord (我叫做謝和弦 謝和弦是我的本名) (EP)
- (2009.04) Nothing But R.Chord (雖然很芭樂)
- (2009.12) The Earth Is Actually Not That Dangerous (地球其實沒有那麼危險) (EP)
- (2011.05) Growing Up (於是長大了以後)
- (2015.06) The Crazy Ones (不需要裝乖)
- (2016.08) Time To Let The World Know (要你知道)
- (2018.12) Be Water (像水一樣)
- (2020.12) 2203 (2203扣人心弦(上))
- (2022.03) Hamen (哈們)

== TV shows ==
- The X-Family (終極一家) as R.Chord (GTV, 2007)
- Hanazakarino Kimitachihe (花樣少年少女) as Dashu (GTV, 2006)
- The Graduate (畢業生) as A Guo (Ep.2) (PTS, 2006)
- KO One (終極一班) as Shayu (GTV, 2005)

== MTV appearances ==
- 愛我 – Danson Tang 唐禹哲
- 晨間新聞 - Tanya Chua 蔡健雅
- 安全感 – S.H.E

== Personal life ==
In 2012, R.Chord surrendered himself to the police as a marijuana user.

In 2016, R.Chord married Keanna Taiyh. In 2018, Taiyh suffered a miscarriage.

In 2019, Taiyh reported R.Chord to the police for drug use after an argument over his drug use. The police seized 18g of marijuana and arrested R.Chord. This resulted in R.Chord announcing he is going to divorce Taiyh who was pregnant. R.Chord was sent to a drug rehabilitation center by court orders and released after 40 days. They divorced in 2020 and Taiyh suffered a miscarriage.

In 2021, he married livestreamer, Liya (Chen Xiangni). After 11 months of marriage, R.Chord and Liya was in the midst of divorce proceedings when Liya was discovered to be pregnant. As a result, the proceedings were cancelled. In 2022, the couple had a daughter, Melody Hsieh.
