= Pauline Lan =

Taiwanese singer, actress and television host

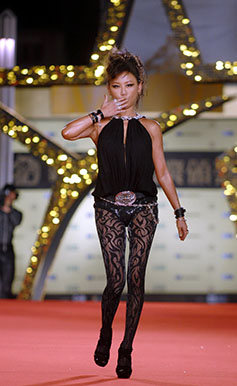
- Born: 16 November 1965 (age 60); Yunlin, Taiwan
- Occupations: Singer, actress, host, businesswoman
- Years active: 1984–present

Chinese name
- Traditional Chinese: 藍心湄
- Simplified Chinese: 蓝心湄
Transcriptions
Standard Mandarin
- Hanyu Pinyin: Lán Xīnméi
- Musical career
- Genres: Mandopop, rock
- Instrument: Vocals

Pauline Lan Xinmei (Chinese: 藍心湄; pinyin: Lán Xīnméi; Wade–Giles: Lan Hsin-Mei; born 16 November 1965) is a Taiwanese host, actress, singer and businesswoman. According to a recent interview with her, she is adopted around the age of 13 or 14.

== Filmography ==
=== Television series ===
Year	Title	Original title	Role
2006	The Spicy Family	麻辣一家親	Man Zu
2007	The X-Family	終極一家	Xia Lan Xing De Xiong (Xiong Ge)
2009	Night Market Life	夜市人生	Tien Mimi
2017	Attention, Love!	稍息立正我愛你	Lu Mei Hua
2018	Girl's Power	女兵日記	Lan Yue Mei
2019	All is Well	你那邊怎樣·我這邊OK	Zhen Di
2023	The Arc of Life	她們創業的那些鳥事	Hao Qinglang

=== Television host ===
TV channel	Title
TTV	台灣風雲榜; Chao ji da fu weng
CTV	今天真好 雞蛋碰石頭 黃金綜藝通; Champion Family TV Show 超級東西軍 接龍友好樂園
CTS	金曲龍虎榜 綜藝大聯盟
STAR	新雞蛋碰石頭
TVBS-G	Queen

=== Film ===
Year	Title	Original title	Role	Notes
1985	Myth of City	台北神話		
1986	The Funny Family	頑皮家族		
1986	A Book of Heroes	歡樂龍虎榜	Hsiao Yehmao	
2014	Café. Waiting. Love	等一個人咖啡	Aunt Jin-dao	
2019	Always Miss You	下一任：前任	Lin's mother	
2023	Red Line	速命道	Pang Ko	

== Discography ==
Year	Album
1984	濃妝搖滾
1985	勁舞的女孩、上緊髮條
1986	新潮一窩蜂
1987	鼓舞
1988	紅蜻蜓的夢、無色彩 Invisible Love
1989	要不要、我要你變心
1990	不偽裝的溫柔、精彩回放
1991	Something in My Eyes
1992	我的溫柔只有你看得見 My Gentleness Is Only Visible to You
1993	一見鐘情 Love At First Sight
1994	愛我到今生 Love Me Forever
1995	夜長夢多 Long Night Dreams
1996	愛走了 Love Is Gone
1997	糖果 Candy
1998	肉餅飯團 Meatloaf with Rice Balls
1999	心湄看新湄 The Cure
2000	你開心了湄？ Are You Happy?
2012	LANDIVA EP
