= Feng Yuanzhen =

Feng Yuanzhen may refer to:

- Yuan-Cheng Fung (born 1919), Chinese-born American scientist and engineer
- Abby Fung (born 1982), Taiwanese actress

== See also ==
- Feng Yuanzheng (born 1962), Chinese actor
