= Material Queen =

2011 Taiwanese television series

- Promotional poster
- Also known as: 拜金女王
- Genre: Romance
- Written by: Chen Yu-shan; Zeng Yong-ting; Wu Zhi-wei; Huang Ji-rou
- Directed by: Chen Wei-ling
- Starring: Vanness Wu; Lynn Hung; Daniel Chan; Jessie Chiang
- Opening theme: Is This All by Vanness Wu
- Ending theme: 一百萬種親吻 by Rachel Liang
- Country of origin: Taiwan
- Original languages: Mandarin; French
- No. of episodes: 1 season (22 episodes)

Production
- Producer: Chen Yu-shan
- Production locations: Taiwan; France
- Running time: approximately 70-79 minutes
- Production company: Orientales Production House

Original release
- Network: CTS
- Release: June 17 – November 11, 2011

Material Queen (Chinese: 拜金女王) is a 2011 Taiwanese romance drama television series, a co-production between Next TV's producer Chen Yu-shan and CTS. It stars Vanness Wu and Lynn Hung. It premiered on June 17, 2011, on CTS. The drama was filmed in Taiwan and France.

== Synopsis ==
Lin Chu Man (Lynn Hung), a fashion model with a sweet appearance and a body that stands out from the other models, does not prejudice against a man for being short, fat, ugly or old, as long as he is rich. One day, she met Cai Jia Hao (Vanness Wu) and thought she had met her perfect Mr. Right, but she doesn't know that he is actually a hired body double for the billionaire "Mr. William Norman". When she discovers that Jia Hao is only a hired body double and his true identity is a penniless music student, she immediately dumps him. As karma would have it, she loses her job to a younger model, her rich lover dumps her and she finds out that Cai Jia Hao will be her new roommate. Chu Man and Jia Hao's unexpected living arrangement forces them to reconcile and to really get to know each other. As Chu Man becomes closer to Jia Hao, her goal of nabbing the real estate tycoon Yan Kai Ming (Daniel Chan) becomes less of a priority. She starts to question whether being rich is what she truly desires.

== Cast ==
=== Main ===
- Vanness Wu as Cai Jia Hao
- Lynn Hung as Lin Chu Man

=== Supporting ===
- Daniel Chan as Yan Kai Ming
- Jessie Chiang as Lu Yi Xian
- Harry Chang as Ke Mai Long
- Annie Chen as Sha Xia

=== Extended cast ===
- Na Wei Dong as Peter Pan
- Meng Fan Gui as Director Dong
- Lin Mei-hsiu as Cai Jia Hui
- Qu Zhong Heng as LEO
- He Wen Hui as Jiang Bao
- David Chen as Brother Sharp
- Yang Li-yin as Big Nanny
- Zhang Huai Qiu as Ke Mai Long (Cameron)

=== Guest cast ===
- Jay Shih as Chia-hao (episode 17)
- Frankie Huang as Fang Chih-hui (episode 2)

== Broadcast ==
Country/region	Channel	Timeslot	Episode premiere	Episode finale
Taiwan	CTS	Friday 22:00	17 June 2011	11 November 2011
Taiwan	ETTV Drama	Saturday 22:00	10 September 2011	2 February 2012
Taiwan	Next TV	Saturday 22:00	18 June 2011	12 November 2011
Taiwan	Super TV	Saturday 22:00	26 June 2011	20 November 2011
Singapore	Channel U	Sunday 21:15	11 November 2011	
Hong Kong	Now 101	Mondays To Fridays 9:00, 21:30	19 October 2011	2 December 2011
