= All's Well, Ends Well 2010 =

2010 Hong Kong film by Raymond Wong and Herman Yau

- Theatrical release poster

Chinese name
- Traditional Chinese: 花田囍事2010
- Simplified Chinese: 花田囍事2010
Transcriptions
Yue: Cantonese
- Jyutping: Fa1 tin4 hei2 si6 2010
- Directed by: Raymond Wong; Herman Yau
- Written by: Edmond Wong
- Produced by: Raymond Wong; Wilson Yip
- Starring: Louis Koo; Sandra Ng; Ronald Cheng; Raymond Wong; Lynn Hung; Angelababy
- Cinematography: Joe Chan
- Edited by: Azrael Chung
- Music by: Brother Hung
- Production companies: Pegasus Motion Pictures; Beijing Enlight Pictures
- Distributed by: Pegasus Motion Pictures
- Release date: 11 February 2010
- Running time: 93 minutes
- Country: Hong Kong
- Language: Cantonese

All's Well, Ends Well 2010 or abbreviated as AWEW 2010 (Chinese: 花田囍事2010) is the fifth instalment of the All's Well, Ends Well series released during China's lunar holiday seasons. Directed by Raymond Wong and Herman Yau, it was released to cinemas in Hong Kong on 11 February 2010.

== Plot ==
Princess Pearl of Flowerland is sent to Midland at a young age to learn her ceremonials duties. Her mother, the Queen Mother misses her daughter very much that the King orders his sister, the princess, to return home. However, the princess has fallen in love with General Wing of the Midland army and is reluctant to part from him. As their boat approaches the Flowerland border, Pearl and Wing save the life of a girl named Ying, who threw herself into the sea in order to escape an arranged marriage. As the boat arrives on shore, General Wing and his troops along with Pearl continue on their journey, leaving the still unconscious Ying on the boat. Shortly thereafter, they are attacked by pirates and Pearl falls into the ocean in the ensuing chaos. Princess Pearl washes ashore within the Flowerland kingdom and is saved by a man named Million, who is revealed to be Ying's father.

Million is poverty stricken. He intends to force his daughter to honour the promise to marry the son (Chuen) of the literary minister Wu so that he can obtain gifts of money. Million realises that Pearl is not his daughter, but as she is suffering from amnesia, he decides to adopt the girl in place of Ying. Wu's eldest daughter, Yau, is hot-tempered and practical woman. When she realises Million has fallen on hard times, she immediately refuses to let them stay in their houses. Finally Wu agrees to let them stay in the servants' quarters until Chuen returns from the Imperial Examination to make his decision about marriage. Upon return, it is discovered that Chuen had earlier fallen deeply in love with a girl he met in town named Ying. He is overwhelmed when he learns that he is asked to marry Ying by her father and immediately wishes to see her. However, he does not recognise Million's daughter as the girl he saw before. He rejects Pearl and Wu is required to pay compensation to Million for the broken engagement. Taking advantage of the situation, Million asks for one million taels as compensation, but Yau in a rap battle, counters that she will pay him only one tael.

Later, the King's troops arrive at the boat of General Wing. Finding it abandoned with exception of an unconscious Ying, they retrieve her mistakenly as Princess Pearl. In the palace, the King decides to select a prince consort for the princess in order to fulfill the happiness of the Queen Mother. Upon seeing the Princess' lavish possessions and home, Ying decides to remain pretending as Princess Pearl. Meanwhile, General Wing continues to search for Pearl and as a foreigner to the Kingdom, he is reluctant to reveal his true identity. During his search, he meets Chuen and Yau. Yau is attracted to Wing and Chuen creates the opportunities for his sister by inviting Wing to stay in their house. At their house, Wing encounters Pearl, but she does not recognise him. Million discovers that Pearl is pregnant and reaches a hasty agreement on the compensation price with Yau. To hide her pregnancy, Pearl is dressed as a man, but meets the King in this guise. The King feels such a strong affinity with the male Pearl that he proposes to make her prince consort. However, Wu also hope Chuen to become prince consort and arranges for him to enter the selection process as a contender. And finally, General Wing hearing that Pearl is in the palace concludes that the Pearl he met earlier must be merely a lookalike and also enters the competition.

The King's competition involves tests of archery, strength, and kung fu. Wing and Chuen, both being highly skilled in combat, pass the tests with flying colours. Pearl however, struggles with the competition and passes only barely from the help of some luck. Despite Wing and Chuen's success, the King chooses the disguised Pearl as the prince consort for his sister. Million realises that he is in a sticky situation as he expected Pearl to lose badly in the competition. With this dilemma, he goes to a bar to get drunk. Wing is also at the bar is determined to reunite with his true love and proposes to kidnap the princess at night. Million overhears this and sees this as an opportunity for him and Pearl to avoid trouble as Pearl would not have to marry the princess if she is kidnapped, giving them an excuse to leave and possibly collect financial compensation from the King. That night, Million eagerly awaits Wing to arrive and kidnap the princess. Pearl and Ying, now in the same bedroom are reluctant to move towards one another. Finally, Wing arrives but, encounters Chuen who plans to kidnap the princess as well. They spar in a kung fu battle, but are apprehended by the King's troops who had anticipated that they might come and kidnap his sister. Million, Wing, and Chuen are captured and ordered to bebeheaded by the King. Million in a desperate moment, reveals the truth of Pearl to the King. The King not believing him, orders everyone to assemble at the palace so they can explain to him the situation.

== Cast ==
- Louis Koo as King
- Sandra Ng as Yau
- Ronald Cheng as General Wing
- Raymond Wong as Million Weng, Ying's Father
- Angelababy as Princess Pearl of Flowerland
- Lynn Hung as Ying
- Lee Heung-kam as Queen Mother
- Kristal Tin as Empress
- Lam Suet
- Pan Yueming
- Ha Chun Chau
- Lam Chi-chung
- Wilfred Lau
