= Lynn Hung =

Hong Kong-based fashion model and actress

- 熊黛林
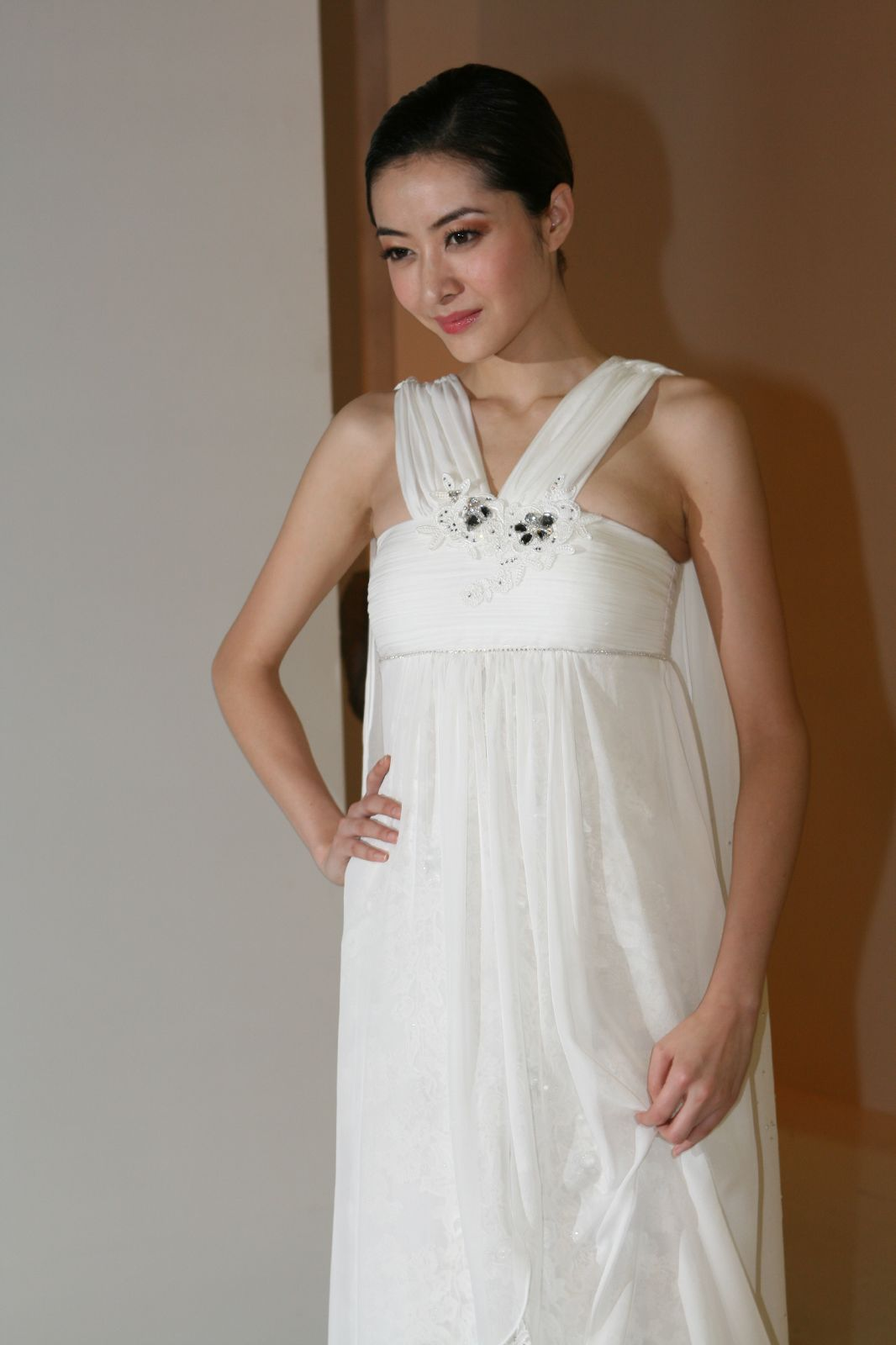
- Hung in 2008
- Born: Xiong Dailin; 10 October 1980 (age 45); Nanjing, Jiangsu, China
- Other name: Lynn Xiong
- Education: Soochow University
- Occupations: Actress; model
- Years active: 2006–present
- Spouse: Ken Kwok (m. 2016)
- Partner: Aaron Kwok (2006–2013)
- Children: Kaylor Kwok (daughter); Lyvia Kwok (daughter)
- Parent(s): Fan Tao (father); Hung Ren Quan (mother)
- Modeling information
- Height: 1.79 m (5 ft 10 in)
- Hair color: Black
- Eye color: Dark brown

Xiong Dailin (Chinese: 熊黛林; pinyin: Xióng Dàilín, born 10 October 1980), better known as Lynn Hung, is a Hong Kong–based fashion model and actress originally from mainland China.

Born in Nanjing, China, Hung moved her base of modeling activities to Hong Kong in 2006 and began working there mainly in the runway scene, becoming known as a top model, and beginning her acting career in 2008.

She became well known as the girlfriend of Aaron Kwok, a singer known as one of Hong Kong's "Four Heavenly Kings", from 2006 to 2013.

Hong Kong press reported in 2009 that she was the No. 4 highest-paid model in Greater China, next to Hong Kong's Gaile Lai (No. 3), mainland China's Jennifer Du (No. 2), and Taiwan's Lin Chi-ling (No. 1).

== Early life ==
Hung was born in Nanjing, China with family roots in Guizhou on 10 October 1980. She later studied costume design and performing arts at Soochow University.

== Career ==
In 1999, Hung developed her career in Shanghai and became the second runner-up in the China National Model Competition. In 2002 she received the "Best Fashion Model" and the "China Top Ten Models" awards.

In 2008, Hung went to Hong Kong and started her acting career in the award-winning film Ip Man starring alongside Donnie Yen. She later appeared in films such as All's Well, Ends Well 2010, Ip Man 2, My Sassy Girl 2, and Ip Man 3.

She has also acted in Material Queen alongside Vanness Wu in 2011.

She has also filmed the show If You Love a Chinese season 2 with Korean actor and entertainer Lee Kwang-soo, who is best known as a cast member of the variety show Running Man.

== Personal life ==
Hung had been in a serious relationship with Aaron Kwok since 2006. In 2012, when Aaron Kwok was planning his engagement to Lynn, her father Fan Tao was hospitalised for liver cancer, so it was postponed indefinitely. Fan later died in January 2013.

Hung dated Hong Kong businessman Ken Kwok in 2014 and they later married in December 2016.

Hung gave birth to twin daughters Kaylor and Lyvia in April 2018, in a private hospital located on Hong Kong Island.

== Filmography ==
=== Film ===
Year	Title	Role	Notes
2003	Welcome to Destination Shanghai		
2008	Ip Man	Cheung Wing-sing	
2009	Short of Love	tall woman	
2010	All's Well, Ends Well 2010	Wong Ying	
2010	Ip Man 2	Cheung Wing-sing	
2010	My Sassy Girl 2		
2011	All's Well, Ends Well 2011	Victoria Lee	
2012	All's Well, Ends Well 2012		
2012	Love Is... Pyjamas		
2013	Hotel Deluxe		
2014	Hello Babies		
2015	Running Man		
2015	The Right Mistake		
2015	The Last Women Standing		
2015	Ip Man 3	Cheung Wing-sing	
2017	S.M.A.R.T. Chase	Ling Mo	
2019	Ip Man 4	Cheung Wing-sing	

=== Television series ===
Year	Title	Role	Notes
2009	Beautiful Cooking II	Herself (guest)	Episode 7
2011	Material Queen	Lin Chuman	
2015	China's Next Top Model C5	Herself	Host
2016	Ding Ge Long Dong Qiang	Herself	Cast
2022	Modern Dynasty	Yip Choi Mei	Cast
