= List of K.O.3an Guo episodes =

This is the episode guide of K.O.3an Guo (終極三國). It currently airs on GTV and FTV.

== Episode list ==
=== Season 1 ===
No.	Title	Original release date
1	"Round 1"	February 27, 2009 / February 28, 2009
Guan Yu and Zhang Fei meet Liu Bei upon arriving to their 24th school just as a group of bandits from Yellow Turban High School arrives to attack them. However, Guan Yu manages to fight off the group with his own hands. Wanting to use Guan Yu and Zhang Fei's strengths, Liu Bei offers to help them enroll East Han Academy by becoming sworn brothers. With a twist of fate, Liu Bei got involved in an accident caused by Da Dong and Xiu is forced to impersonate Liu Bei.
2	"Round 2"	March 6, 2009 / March 7, 2009
Members of He Dong Institute come to East Han Academy and blocked everyone out with a magical atmosphere formed by the Eight Doors Golden Lock Formation. While trying to break it down, Xiu/Liu Bei and Xiao Qiao get trapped inside. In order to free them and save the school from He Dong Institute's hands, Guan Yu and Zhang Fei seek out to find other warriors in hopes to make use of their strengths. Eventually, their search leads to Ma Chao and Huang Zhong. With the united strengths of Guan Yu, Zhang Fei, Zhao Yun, Ma Chao and Huang Zhong, they walk into the world of illusion to face the trials.
3	"Round 3"	March 13, 2009 / March 14, 2009
The Five Tiger Generals have conquered the Eight Doors Golden Lock Formation, but during the final trial, Guan Yu's arm gets shot by a poisonous arrow. When the poison begins to take over, Xiu/Liu Bei and the others seek out Ming Yi, the only healer who can treat his arm. But upon arriving, the doctor hears that one of them is Ma Chao and refuses to heal Guan Yu's arm. When Ma Chao finds out that Ming Yi is actually the mother of his dead friend, the other boys help him find the courage to face his past. Though Ming Yi and Ma Chao's issue has been overcome, she still refuses to heal Guan Yu and the responsibility to passed on to her apprentice: Hua Tuo. Dong Cheng Wei pays Xiu/Liu Bei a visit.
4	"Round 4"	March 20, 2009 / March 21, 2009
While celebrating Guan Yu's recovery at a local pub, Diao Chan got kidnapped by Li Ru and Me Niang. The Five Tiger Generals have three days to rescue Diao Chan from the grasp of Yellow Turban High School. However, Lu Bu appears and beats them to the punch, thus making him Diao Chan's official Body Guard and a student in DEast Han Academy.
5	"Round 5"	March 27, 2009 / March 28, 2009
Newcomer Lu Bu desires to take on the position as student body president, so he signs up to run against Cao Cao.´Meanwhile, everyone worries for Guan Yu now that Lu Bu and Diao Chan have developed a strong friendship.
6	"Round 6"	April 3, 2009 / April 4, 2009
Newcomer Lu Bu desires to take on the position as student body president. Guan Yu makes a decision to make Diao Chan happy. Something seems to be up with Lu Bu and whoever sent him to East Han Academy. Yellow Turban High School reappears and challenges East Han Academy in a hockey match. However, during the competition, the Yellow Turban competitors conquer the Five Tiger Generals with tricks. As they ready to take over East Han Academy, He Dong Institute's soldiers arrive and chase them away just before Principal Wang suddenly falls into a coma, allowing Dong Zhuo, He Dong Institute's principal, to take over East Han Academy.
7	"Round 7"	April 10, 2009 / April 11, 2009
East Han Academy has been taken over by the He Dong Institute; principal Dong Zhuo is taking full advance in acclaiming the highest position in the school world. Meanwhile, Zhao Yun runs into Dong Zhuo's trap and the Five Tiger Generals run in to rescue him, thus falling into another trap by Dong Zhuo. As they are overrun by enemies, Xiu/Liu Bei is forced by the situation to reveal his powers to save them. However, his identity is not revealed. Cao Cao continues to suspect Xiu/Liu Bei.
8	"Round 8"	April 17, 2009 / April 18, 2009
Zhao Yun has lost his abilities due to Suo Ma Li Ya (Maria's Lock), a lock that closes off a person's ability forever. Everyone works together to figure out how to restore Zhao Yun's abilities and Xiu/Liu Bei tries using his musical skills to restore his powers, but it proves no effect at all. Dong Zhuo reveals to the world about Lu Bu being his adoptive son; thus destroying his relationship with Diao Chan. Cao Cao begins to show his dark side and his attractions to Xiao Qiao, who also shows feelings to Zhao Yun. Xiao Qiao helps the boys sneak into the principal's office and steal the remote that has the power to unlock Suo Ma Li Ya (Maria's Lock) and restore Zhao Yun's abilities. Though having successfully stolen the remote, something happens to the computer they are connecting the remote to, and when Cao Cao removes the plug, Zhao Yun goes berserk.
9	"Round 9"	April 24, 2009 / April 25, 2009
Cao Cao, with some assistance from Lu Bu, manages to find the real remote and remove Suo Ma Li Ya's hold on Zhao Yun's powers, gaining his abilities back. Xiu/Liu Bei gets a copy of Romance of the Three Kingdoms from his dimension and learns something disturbing about Diao Chan, which may not be true. Guan Yu and Diao Chan grow closer to each other. Lu Bu disappears in order to protect Diao Chan from his stepfather. Cao Cao, Xiu/Liu Bei and the Five Tiger Generals make a plan to kidnap Dong Zhuo.
10	"Round 10"	May 1, 2009 / May 2, 2009
The kidnapping was a failure, and Dong Zhuo plots to find the culprit who attacked him. His search finally leads to Cao Cao, who escaped with Guan Yu in hopes to get away from the problems for a while. In the end, they were still captured. Now they are about to become condemned to death. Sun Shang Xiang appears and offers to help. However, she states that she can only save either Cao Cao or Guan Yu.
11	"Round 11"	May 8, 2009 / May 9, 2009
With some large help from Sun Shang Xiang, Guan Yu and Cao Cao are both spared from a death sentence. However, Guan Yu, due to certain circumstances, is ordered to remain jailed for another 7 days till his second verdict. Dong Zhuo switches souls with a dog after he attempted to attack Zhang Bao but got interrupted by the dog. Thus, while Dong Zhuo (in a dog's body) is under the care of the Five Tiger Generals, Cao Cao, revealing a darker side of himself meanwhile, takes on the role of the principal. Lu Bu returns to East Han Academy and the position of Student Body President is returned to Cao Cao. Sun Shang Xiang transfers to East Han Academy and is set to stay under the Cao Cao's residence.
12	"Round 12"	May 15, 2009 / May 16, 2009
Dong Zhuo, with help from Li Ru, escapes with the dog. They attempt to switch back their souls. However, both Dong Zhuo and the dog went missing through one of the experiments. Soon, one by one, the students and staff of East Han Academy begin to go missing as well. Xiu/Liu Bei, Guan Yu, Zhang Fei and Sun Shang Xiang are left to solve the mystery before they disappear too.
13	"Round 13"	May 22, 2009 / May 23, 2009
Sun Shang Xiang discovers the truth behind the disappearances. It is actually the doing of Dong Zhuo and a few ghostly creatures from Chong Dong (in Silver Dimension) (Mie of Iron Dimension). Dong Zhuo releases all the students with a promise from Guan Yu - that he will support Dong Zhuo when he becomes Meng Zhu. Zhou Yu, vice student body president of Jiangdong High School arrives to bring Sun Shang Xiang back.
14	"Round 14"	May 29, 2009 / May 30, 2009
Sun Shang Xiang returns to Jiangdong High School after Taishi Ci revealed that she agreed to a marriage arrangement with Runan High School's Yuan Shao. Liu Bei suffers from love sickness, after which Cao Cao tries to do some matchmaking with the most popular girl on internet with Liu Bei who turns out to be Xiao Qiao's sister Da Qiao and also the separate persona of Han in the Silver Dimension. However, an ugly middle age lady turns up instead and the date turns disastrous. Meanwhile, Jiangdong High School's Sun Ce, who is also the separate counterpart of Da Dong and Xia Tian in the Silver Dimension, tries to come up with a plan to save his sister from an unhappy marriage.
15	"Round 15"	June 5, 2009 / June 6, 2009
Xiu/Liu Bei, Guan Yu, Zhang Fei, Zhao Yun, Ma Chao, Huang Zhong and Xiao Qiao infiltrate Jiangdong High School to look for Sun Shang Xiang. Xiao Qiao seems to have a past with Zhou Yu. With some help from Xiao Qiao and schemes from Zhou Yu and Sun Ce, the Five Tiger Generals manage to escape with Xiu/Liu Bei and Sun Shang Xiang. Dong Zhuo entrusts Guan Yu with a secret mission with the motive to break the Five Tiger Generals' relationship by making them doubt each other.
16	"Round 16"	June 12, 2009 / June 13, 2009
Diao Chan, Zhang Fei, Huang Zhong and Ma Chao drink a potion that changes their personalities completely. Cao Cao, Sun Shang Xiang and the Five Tiger Generals hide Wang Yun for his safety. Dong Zhuo orders Lu Bu to assassinate Principal Wang in order to end his worries, but when he finds Principal Wang missing, he has no choice but to teach Lu Bu the method to heal him hoping to use that as a way to find Principal Wang and capture Cao Cao and the Tiger Generals. However, they manage to outsmart him and Principal Wang finally awakes from his coma.

=== Season 2 ===
No.	Title	Original release date
17	"Round 17"	June 19, 2009 / June 20, 2009
Diao Chan confesses to Guan Yu and both of them become a couple. Dong Zhuo assigns the task of setting the exam papers to Guan Yu. This upsets Xun Yu, Cao Cao's close family, and whose family has been exam setters for generations. Cao Cao and the Five Tiger Generals' relationship are strained. Diao Chan is accused of stealing the writing brush that Dong Zhuo gave Guan Yu to set the exam papers, and is expelled from school.
18	"Round 18"	June 26, 2009 / June 27, 2009
To exonerate Diao Chan's name, Ah Xiang arranges a lie-detecting activity to catch the culprit, who turns out to be Xun Yu. Meanwhile, Guan Yu drinks a memory-loss potion and forgets his promise to Dong Zhuo and Diao Chan. In order for him to remember everything again, his friends and enemies plot to restore his memories by making him urinate. Everyone works hard for midterm. In the end, only Zhang Fei and Xiao Qiao fail.
19	"Round 19"	July 3, 2009 / July 04, 2009
Principal Wang suggests the Five Tiger Generals to find proof in Dong Zhuo's office in order to turn the authorities to their favor, but Dong Zhuo was already expecting them. They were at disadvantage until Xiu/Liu Bei uses his powers to help fend him off. The Five Tiger Generals and Xiu/Liu Bei's lives are put at risk when Dong Zhuo decides to send one of them to fight against students of Nan Xiong Nu High School and Bai Po Huang Jin High School, who have invaded He Dong Institute during his absence. Meanwhile, Lu Bu and Guan Yu suffer from internal injuries of Zhen Cha Jing.
20	"Round 20"	July 10, 2009 / July 11, 2009
Dong Zhuo cheats his way into forcing Xiu/Liu Bei and Zhao Yun to go to He Dong Gao Xiao to fight with the Nan Xiong Nu and Huang Jin Zei. Because Jiang Gan has knowledge of Dong Zhuo's plans, he gets abducted by Dong Zhuo in the process. Ah Xiang insists on going with Liu Bei to battle, which Liu Bei strongly disagrees with, and the couple ends up having an argument.
21	"Round 21"	July 17, 2009 / July 18, 2009
While surrounded at He Dong Gao Xiao, Zhou Yu, Cao Cao, Ah Xiang and the rest of the Five Tiger Generals arrive to expand their power. Eventually, they all return home safely. Meanwhile, after many years of separation, Huang Zhong finally reunites with his mother, but also hears a shocking truth from her: she is a member of Huang Jin High School.
22	"Round 22"	July 24, 2009 / July 25, 2009
Huang Zhong meets more troubles with his mother when reporters of Dong Han News spot them eating dinner. Meanwhile, a handicapped girl from Liu Bei's past mysteriously appears. When Xiu/Liu Bei looks into the Three Kingdoms novel, he finds out that the girl is historically Liu Bei's first wife.Because of Gan Zhao Lie's appearance, Xiu/Liu Bei is vexed. Gan Zhao Lei is Liu Bei's fiancee by their parents arrangement before they were born.
23	"Round 23"	August 1, 2009 / August 1, 2009
Gan Zhao Lie stayed in Cao Cao's house for the moment. Strange things started to occur. First, it was Ah Xiang's strange illness, then Xiao Qiao got poisoned. Ah Xiang pointed out that Gan Zhao Lie is the culprit, but everybody thought she was jealous, so nobody believed her. When she got found out of her misdoings, she escaped but got captured by a mysterious dark force which tried to attack the Five Tiger Generals. Many strange events have been happening in the Silver Dimension and Dong Han Shu Yuan which made Liu Bei wonder if it was because of his previous interventions. Diao Chan has a red patch on her eye and students start to get away from her.
24	"Round 24"	August 8, 2009 / August 7, 2009
Diao Chan suffers a fatal side effect from Bian Hen Da. Lu Bu uses Zhen Cha Jing to heal Diao Chan and hopes to make her his again, but when she turns him down, his demonzation begins as he leaves the path of good and attempts to steal Diao Chan from Guan Yu. On that day, Ah Xiang managed to find Gan Zhao Lie and brought her into Cao Cao's residence to live with her. Meanwhile, Xiao Qiao's older sister Da Qiao appears and her arrival comes with bad intentions.
25	"Round 25"	August 15, 2009 / August 14, 2009
Xiao Qiao's older sister, Da Qiao transfers to Dong Han Academy to spy on Guan Yu while searching for Sun Ce, who went missing three days ago. Meanwhile, Ah Xiang notices a strange behavior from Xiu/Liu Bei when he is around Da Qiao. Dong Zhuo's alternate counterpart, Xia Liu, takes a trip to the Silver Dimension requested by Jiu Wu to assist Xiu/Liu Bei.
26	"Round 26"	August 22, 2009 / August 21, 2009
Dong Zhuo tricks Diao Chan to convince Guan Yu to continue practicing Zhen Cha Jing, which worsens his internal injuries. Ah Xiang pulls a trick of her own to make Dong Zhuo tell her the cure to Guan Yu's wounds. Though the method works, it turns out to be another one of Dong Zhuo's tricks to worsen his condition. Meanwhile, Da Qiao tries to make a confession to Xiu/Liu Bei, which troubles everyone. Lu Bu finally discovers his father's true nature.
27	"Round 27"	August 29, 2009 / August 28, 2009
Diao Chan is in trouble: Dong Zhuo accuses her of using fake coins for the class funds, and forces her to pay for breaking the school rule. Lu Bu becomes more aggressive. Xiao Qiao and Da Qiao resolve their problems. Meanwhile, Xiao Qiao and Zhao Yun are becoming incredibly close, which further pushes Cao Cao to find the courage to confess his feelings to her.
28	"Round 28"	September 5, 2009 / September 4, 2009
Something about Xiao Qiao's past is bothering her. Cao Cao tries to find the opportunity to confess his feelings to her, but when he realizes how painful she is about love, he decides to let go. Ah Xiang is forced by her father to fulfill her marriage agreement to Yuan Shao. Meanwhile, the real Liu Bei returns to the Silver Dimension, taking off where his plans left off.
29	"Round 29"	September 12, 2009 / September 11, 2009
Liu Bei has returned to the Silver Dimension, which ends Xiu's impersonation. Xiu shares a tearful goodbye with his sworn brothers and Ah Xiang. Meanwhile, the real Liu Bei plots to joins forces with Lu Bu to destroy both Dong Zhuo and Cao Cao. However, his scam causes an unexpected twist for Xiu.
30	"Round 30"	September 19, 2009 / September 18, 2009
When Dong Zhuo sends the Five Tiger Generals to fight against an army of Huang Jin High School soldiers, Huang Zhong is forced to erupt a battle with his own mother. Lu Bu is on standby, waiting for the opportunity to kill everything in sight. In hopes to save the Five Tiger Generals from execution, the remainder of the team concocts a plan to rescue them. Ah Xiang makes a bad suggestion that may ultimately destroy Diao Chan and Guan Yu's relationship.
31	"Round 31"	September 26, 2009 / September 25, 2009
Yuan Shao arrives just as a battle between the Five Tiger Generals and Dong Zhuo ensues. Yuan Shao flies into rage when he meets Xiu/Liu Bei, the man who stole his bride. Meanwhile, Lu Bu convinces Guan Yu to join forces with him in dethroning Dong Zhuo.
32	"Round 32"	October 2, 2009 / October 3, 2009
Guan Yu tells his friends and loved ones about his shortened lifespan. Wang Yun decides to return to his rightful place as headmaster of Dong Han Academy, but when they arrive, Dong Zhuo takes control over Lu Bu and Guan Yu, ordering them to attack Principal Wang and his protectors. Xiu/Liu Bei is torn between letting Guan Yu take the path of tragedy and stripping away his powers forever. This is the finale of season two.

=== Season 3 ===
Last Season of K.0. 3anguo Episode 52 should be when Ah Xiang regained consciousness, and then they were trapped in illusion space.

No.	Title	Original release date
33	"Round 33"	October 9, 2009 / October 10, 2009
Xiu draws power from the Soul Calming Melody to restore Guan Yu's powers. During the experiment, the melody somehow provokes the evil essences in Lu Bu and Dong Zhuo and draws everyone into battle. Zhang Fei, Zhao Yun, Ma Chao, Huang Zhong and Ah Xiang work hard to protect them from being interrupted, but Guan Yu disrupts the experiment himself to protect his friends. The next day, Guan Yu begins to age rapidly as side effect from interrupting the experiment. Xiu combines as many forces as he can to try the experiment one last time, which leads to a bloodbathing battle. They got back Guan Yu's powers in the end.
34	"Round 34"	October 16, 2009 / October 17, 2009
Dong Zhuo has placed a bomb on the principal's chair. When Xiu tries to remove it with a spell, he accidentally reveals his capability of magic to Ah Xiang. It was later found out that the bomb was a fake, and the real bomb is placed somewhere else. The Five Tiger Generals found the bomb in the Science Lab, which had LuBu strapped on it in Dong Zhuo's attempt to kill him too. The Five Tiger Generals used their power to absorb the poison from the bomb which would stop the bomb. Xiu and Ah Xiang comes in late and too sucks in the poison using their "wulabaha" power. Upon realization that they used the same power, they asked each other about it. They then met with Ah Gong who confirms that Ah Xiang is his disciple and lies to Ah Xiang that Xiu is also his disciple. Meanwhile, Yuan Shao arrives at Dong Han Academy and uses his new political power to take Ah Xiang away.
35	"Round 35"	October 23, 2009 / October 24, 2009
Yuan Shao and Guan Yu erupt in a contest for Ah Xiang after she was kidnapped by Liu Bei's "old friend", who constantly pesters Xiu for money. Meanwhile, the historic emperor of Eastern Wu, Sun Quan, arrives. And his intentions are not good. The three future kingdoms arrange a meeting for the first time.
36	"Round 36"	October 30, 2009 / October 31, 2009
Dong Zhuo dethrones Liu Bian. Lu Bu believes it is time to face up to his dad but soon to find out that his dad, Dong Zhu already knew he had a secret army/troop. He tries to find out the reason why Dong Zhuo knew, which was through his Siman watch-phone.
37	"Round 37"	November 6, 2009 / November 7, 2009
Principle Wang is killed by Dong Zhuo. Wu Hu Jiang, Xiu/Liu Bei and Cao Cao plan to have a fight with Dong Zhuo. Diao Chan tries to stop Dong Zhuo from recovering his Devil Powers after the boys had attacked him, and both falls off a cliff, this when the boys catch up and Guan Yu jumps after the fall, while he wakes up after his faint at the bottom, he has forgotten everything about Diao Chan. Back to Cao Cao's House, the guys try to figure out ideas to help Guan Yu but Xiao Qiao tells them to forget about it, as she received a letter from Diao Chan saying that she gave Guan Yu a potion.
38	"Round 38"	November 13, 2009 / November 14, 2009
Wu Hu Jiang, Xiu/Liu Bei, Cao Cao and Xiao Qiao keeps the secret that Diao Chan is most probably dead from Guan Yu, according to Diao Chan's last letter to Xiao Qiao. Yuan Shao forces Xian Di to appoint him as Cheng Xiang. Thereafter, Yuan Shao takes control over Dong Han Academy and wishes to demolish it. Cao Cao gets furious and look for ways to preserve the school Principal Wang has left behind. Meanwhile, Ma Chao discovers a website which leads them to Zhuge Liang's house. However, Zhuge Liang chases them out of his house. Ma Chao receives a Siman call by his father to help out in Liang Zhou. Zhao Yun and Huang Zhong follows, leaving Xiu/Liu Bei, Zhang Fei, Guan Yu to seek Zhuge Liang's help to save the school.
39	"Round 39"	November 20, 2009 / November 21, 2009
Guan Yu remembers Diao Chan and is upset that he has actually forgotten her all these while. He decided to go to Liu Cheng and wait for Diao Chan. Zhou Yu has a plan to lure Xiu/Liu Bei into Jiang Dong; to weaken Cao Cao's forces and for Liu Bei and Sun Quan to form alliance. Ah Xiang plans to leave Jiang Dong to help Xiu/Liu Bei, however, she is stopped by her father Sun Jian.
40	"Round 40"	November 27, 2009 / November 28, 2009
Xiu/Liu Bei is insistent on returning to Dong Han to help Cao Cao. Sun Quan lets Xiu/Liu Bei choose; to die under his army or to form alliance with him. Dong Han Academy is demolished by Yuan Shao, and it turned out that Zhou Yu was the one who came out with the idea. A soldier from Sun Quan's army attempts to assassinate him, but is discovered by Xiu/Liu Bei. In order to repay him, Sun Quan lends them Jing Zhou Da Lou for them as a temporary school.
41	"Round 41"	December 4, 2009 / December 5, 2009
Zhou Yu discovers the royal army Xiu/Liu Bei has. He uses the royal army as an opportunity to wreck Xiu/Liu Bei and Cao Cao's friendship. However, it failed and Sun Quan is furious. He attempts to kill Xiu/Liu Bei, Cao Cao and Zhang Fei secretly but is stopped by Da Qiao. Xiu/Liu Bei, Cao Cao, Zhuge Liang, Xiao Qiao and Zhang Fei starts school at Jing Zhou Da Lou, but they have to overcome obstacles.
42	"Round 42"	December 11, 2009 / December 12, 2009
Cao Cao decides to hold Ah Xiang as a hostage to stop Jiang Dong from harming them. Sun Quan finds out and chases after Ah Xiang. He declares that whoever helps Ah Xiang to escape will be killed. Sun Quan injured Xiao Qiao and is blamed by Da Qiao. Liu Bei leaves Jiang Dong to find Ah Gong and Ah Xiang. Da Qiao is found to be the mastermind of assassinating Sun Quan.
43	"Round 43"	December 18, 2009 / December 19, 2009
Sun Quan comes up with an idea to save Da Qiao and seeks Cao Cao's help. Xiao Qiao finds out that Zhou Yu was the one who caused Dong Han Academy to be demolished, and thinks that he was also the one behind the ploy to make Cao Cao blind, and is very upset. Zhou Yu is jealous as Cao Cao and Xiao Qiao's relationship gets closer.
44	"Round 44"	December 25, 2009 / December 26, 2009
Sun Quan gives Cao Cao an army of three hundred men to defeat Yuan Shao. Cao Cao agrees. Huang Yue Ying, Jiang Dong's legendary talent is furious; she thinks that Cao Cao has betrayed her trust in them by accepting the army. She warns Cao Cao, Zhuge Liang, Da Qiao and Xiao Qiao that Sun Quan has a secret and wants them to be careful. Zhuge Liang expresses a liking in Huang Yue Ying. Zhou Yu has invented a bomb that will cause one's enemy to be temporary blinded, and a mine that will explode for three times consecutively. Sun Jian asks Da Qiao out, unknowingly to her, to the mine. Da Qiao becomes temporary deaf as a result. Sun Quan teaches her lip-reading. The real mastermind behind the assassination of Sun Quan is Chen Wu. Da Qiao happens to witness Chen Wu attacking Sun Quan and comes forth to stop her. Da Qiao finds out the secret which Huang Yue Ying said that Sun Quan was hiding.
45	"Round 45"	January 1, 2010 / January 2, 2010
Xiao Qiao decides to consider her relationship with Cao Cao carefully while he is away fighting Yuan Shao. Reinforcements from Xiu/Liu Bei comes in when Cao Cao is about to leave for the war.
46	"Round 46"	January 8, 2010 / January 9, 2010
Ah Xiang and Xiu/Liu Bei returns to Jiang Dong. Xiu/Liu Bei plans to return to Dong Han. Sun Jian tries to kill Da Qiao, Xiao Qiao, Zhuge Liang and Zhang Fei, but Cao Cao turns up unexpectedly, claiming to have defeated Yuan Shao. Cao Cao plans to return to Dong Han alone. Xiao Qiao makes a choice between Cao Cao and Zhou Yu. Sun Jian agrees to their marriage provided Xiu/Liu Bei can pass through his test.
47	"Round 47"	January 15, 2010 / January 16, 2010
Sun Jian makes Sun Quan and Xiu/Liu Bei compete archery. Xiu/Liu Bei loses to Sun Quan on purpose. Ah Xiang confesses to Xiu/Liu Bei and he admits to Ah Xiang about his identity. Sun Ce is assassinated on his way back to Jiang Dong. Da Qiao suffers from depression upon hearing the news.
48	"Round 48"	January 22, 2010 / January 23, 2010
Sun Jian tells Ah Xiang that Sun Quan has lost his hearing two years ago, so as to let Ah Xiang stay in Jiang Dong. Guan Yu returns. Da Qiao decides to leave and fulfil Sun Ce's wish. Zhou Yu is appointed as the new Eastern Wu Academy's President.
49	"Round 49"	January 29, 2010 / January 30, 2010
Jiang Dong and Cao Cao plan to have a war. Liu Bei advises Cao Cao against it and is allegedly injured by Cao Cao. Liu Bei decides to break off ties with Cao Cao and form an alliance with the Suns. Ma Chao, Zhao Yun and Huang Zhong returns. Liu Bei, Ma Chao and Huang Zhong set off to Yi Zhou High School to discuss matters with the Principal, Liu Zhang. However, things make an unexpected change and Liu Bei ends up being the acting principal of Yi Zhou High School. Sun Quan sends the rest of the Five Tiger Generals to fight Cao Cao. Guan Yu breaks off from the rest meets Cao Cao in his army grounds. He discovers something alarming about Liu Bei.
50	"Round 50"	February 6, 2010 / February 6, 2010
Ah Xiang senses something strange with Liu Bei. Ah Gong comes to Silver Dimension with Ye Si Ren and unravels the truth of Sun family's history. Zhao Yun remains in the Jiang Dong army meant for warring with Cao Cao while Guan Yu and Zhang Fei returns to Jiang Dong.
51	"Round 51"	February 12, 2010 / February 13, 2010
Liu Bei has gained full control of Yi Zhou High School and declares that he will not return Jing Zhou Da Lou. Liu Bei leaves Guan Yu alone in Jiang Dong to guard Jing Zhou Da Lou. Sun Quan is furious when he learns that Liu Bei is controlling both Yi Zhou and Jing Zhou and defeats Guan Yu. Guan Yu dies. Zhang Fei discovers that the real Liu Bei has returned for a period of time without any one of them noticing and turns suicidal. The rest of the Five Tiger Generals return to Jiang Dong to mourn for Guan Yu and Zhang Fei. Xiu managed to return to Silver Dimension and came clean with the Five General who were happy for him. Guan Yu and Zhang Fei too gave the Five Generals a surprise with them not being dead after all.
52	"Round 52"	February 19, 2010 / February 20, 2010
Ah Xiang finds out that Xiu has returned to Iron Dimension and is adamant on finding him. Iron Dimension finds out that Sun Jian is demonized and has hidden Ah Xiang. The Five Tiger Generals and Xiu decide to battle Sun Jian. Sun Quan finally discovered that his family members were killed by Sun Jian, and faking it that Sun Quan is Sun Jian's son. The five generals, Xiu, Dong Cheng Wei, CaoCao, Zhou Yu and Qiang Bian Tuan fight it out with the demonized Sun Jian but got trapped in an imaginary space created by Sun Jian. They managed to get out but were then faced with a demonized Ah Xiang, who in the end managed to regain her consciousness with Xiu's love.
53	"Last Round"	February 26, 2010 / February 27, 2010
Sun Jian loses his powers after the tedious battle and kills himself. Ah Xiang and Xiu returns to Iron Dimension. The Five Tiger Generals decide to separate from Liu Bei. CaoCao, ZhouYu and Liu Bei along with Zhu Ge Liang split the Three Kingdoms. Zhao Yun decides to tour the world. Zhang Fei takes over his family business and managed to salvage it and becomes rich. Ma Chao and Huang Zhong open a surfing business by the sea. Guan Yu is in Liu Cheng, waits for Diao Chan's return. They eventually meet each other.
