= List of K.O.3an Guo characters =

This is a character list of the Taiwanese series K.O.3an Guo which aired between February 2009 to February 2010.

== The Five Tiger Generals (五虎將) ==
=== Guan Yu (關羽) ===
Five Tiger General: 1st.
Courtesy name: Guan Yunchang (關雲長).
School year: Freshman.
Birthdate: Silver Dimensional Year 4332, July 24.
Age: 17 years old.
Species: Power-user.
Aura: Gold.
Status: Alive.
Fighting Power Points: 18000 -> 30000+(After learning Xing Tian Gong)
Original counterpart: Guan Yu
Actor: George Hu (胡宇崴) – Wu Hu Jiang (武虎將).

Biography:
Guan Yu is straight-headed, righteous and loyal. He is known for fighting around the world alongside his best friend, Zhang Fei, with whom he has attended twenty-four schools together (only because he always gets kicked out for starting fights). Eventually, he lands a place in East Han Academy (東漢書院) with the help of his sworn brother, Liu Bei.

Because of his honesty, he is sometimes taken advantage of by his enemies. And because of that, his friends are often forced to lie to him, which leads to unpredicted consequences.

Guan Yu's face turns red on two occasions; when he is around a beautiful girl or when he gets really upset.

- Demonization:

Guan Yu learns the skill of Zhen Cha Jing from Lu Bu after he was instructed by Dong Zhuo, to restore Principal Wang's health. Though he succeeds in healing Principal Wang, he begins to suffer from internal injuries until he eventually collapses while slowly being demonized. Sun Shang Xiang later tricks Dong Zhuo to give her instructions to cure Guan Yu by using nightmarish toxin. Dong Zhuo instructs her the skill of Hao Cha Jing would heal his condition. Though Guan Yu's condition finally lightens up, his internal injuries are only dormant for the time being while his powers and instincts demonize slowly.

Lu Bu later tells him of his demonized powers and shortened lifespan in hopes to convince him in stopping Dong Zhuo and dethrone Liu Bian, but Guan Yu declines the offer. As he realizes how dangerous he will become to the world, he attempts to give up his powers and martial arts to prevent himself from taking the path of evil, but Xiu/Liu Bei arrives just in time to stop him. After he tells them of Zhen Cha Jing's side effects, Xiu/Liu Bei takes out a pair of cymbals called Demon Subduing Cymbals (Ke Mo Ba) that will reduce his dangerous and competitive instincts.

In a battle against Dong Zhuo, Guan Yu falls under his control and attacks his friends, but Xiu/Liu Bei stops him with the cymbals. He blames himself for hurting his friends, even though he knows that he was not himself. In order to help him, Xiu/Liu Bei suggests to use the Soul Cleansing Melody to strip his powers away forever. Though he hesitated at first, Diao Chan convinces him to live. The following day, Xiu/Liu Bei finds out about the capability of the Soul Calming Melody which can be played within 24 hours of the Soul Cleansing Melody to restore the victims powers and decides to use its power to restore Guan Yu's. However, as soon as Xiu/Liu Bei begins to draw power from it, it lures demons, Lu Bu and Dong Zhuo to their location and they are stopped midway. Because the experiment failed, Guan Yu began to age rapidly the next day. Xiu/Liu Bei turns to Xia Liu for advice and finds out that they could combine their powers to restore Guan Yu's powers again. Together, they find a place filled with positive energy and their battle armies to fend off the demons while the rest play the Soul Calming Melody. After a rough fight with the superior demons, Guan Yu's powers are finally restored. His powers were slightly amplified after they were restored.

- Friendship:

He becomes sworn brothers with best friend Zhang Fei and his new friend Liu Bei to enroll East Han Academy. Because he is unaware that Liu Bei is actually Xiu from the Iron Dimension, he is often kept in the dark from Xiu and Zhang Fei's secret conversations. However, he remains in complete faith with his brothers.

Initially he did not get along with Zhao Yun, but after he risks his own arm to take in a poisonous arrow for him, their relationship begins to change. He also forms a friendship with companions: Ma Chao and Huang Zhong.

- Love life:

He develops a crush on the principal's daughter, Diao Chan, already on his first day at school. However, when she begins seeing Lu Bu, his feelings become conflicted. After Diao Chan and Lu Bu's relationship falls apart, Guan Yu becomes increasingly close to her, despite she is still in love with Lu Bu. He indicates that he only wants what's best for her, not what he wants from her. While under the influence of a personality changing potion, Diao Chan confesses to Guan Yu and they become a couple.

- Supposed Death:

Under Liu Bei orders, Guan Yu guarded Jin Zhou Lou alone and was killed in the fight with Sun Quan as Lu Meng interfered. Then it was revealed that he actually did not die. He used a type of power that allows the user to not breathe, and then when they buried him, he dug himself out.

Nicknames:
Ah Chang (阿長) by Diao Chan while they are a couple.

Specialty:
Guan Yu's weapon is “Qing Long Yan Yue Dao” (青龍偃月刀 / Green Dragon Crescent Moon Blade).

He can easily learn the opponent's moves and find his weak point. Because of that, he is known as one of the strongest martial artists in history.

Guan Yu uses "Xing Tian Kuai Quan" (行天快拳 / Sky Crossing Speed Fist) attack opponents at lightning speed.

Guan Yu's primary attacks are three powerful blows learned from "Xing Tian Gong" (行天功); a series of powerful kung fu skills inherited from his family. His first attack is "Xing Tian Po" (行天破), which allows him to produce offensive raw energy toward his opponents and neutralize their attacks. He once explained that if he uses it with full strength, his target will explode to millions of pieces.

During his encounter with the legendary magician, Zuo Ci, he acquires two additional attacks from this ability called "Xing Tian Po" (行天迫) and "Xing Tian Po" (行天魄), which respectively work as methods to repress and ultimate destroy the opponent.

The second Xing Tian Po also allows him to attack nearby enemies in great speed, which even exceeds the speed of his Sky Crossing Speed skill.

When he releases all three attacks, the impact is utmost powerful.

According to the character's biography on GTV.com, Guan Yu's strongest attack is called "Dragon Moaning Space" (龍吟太虛).

Alternate counterpart:
Guan Yu has an alternate counterpart in the Iron Dimension called the Great Traveler, who is born with an evil half called the God of Guns. To everyone else, they are known as a pair of legendary warriors of good.

=== Zhang Fei (張飛) ===
Five Tiger General: 2nd.
Courtesy name: Zhang Yide (張翼德).
School year: Freshman.
Birthdate: Silver Dimensional Year 4333, April 17.
Age: 17 years old.
Species: Power-user.
Aura: Blue/Black (When angry).
Status: Alive.
Fighting Power Points: 18000+ -> 22000 (When he gets angry)
Original counterpart: Zhang Fei
Actor: Bo Yan (博炎) – Wu Hu Jiang (武虎將).

Biography:
Zhang Fei himself comes from a very wealthy family. All gangster members are afraid of his wrath and would do anything to avoid provoking him, even pretending to be nice and polite.

With some help from his sworn brother Liu Bei, Zhang Fei manages to enroll East Han Academy with best friend Guan Yu – where he can explore his abilities. But he is also responsible in paying all of their tuition.

He is the first person to meet Da Dong, Ya Se and Xiao Yu from KO One (終極一班); and Xiu from The X-Family (終極一家). He is also the only person who knows of Xiu's true identity, as well as the existence of the twelve dimensions.

- Friendship:

Zhang Fei has been friends with Guan Yu since childhood. They even attended twenty-four schools and got resulted in suspension together. When they encounter Liu Bei, the three of them become sworn brothers, with Zhang Fei being the youngest.

Initially, he does not get along with Zhao Yun because of his arrogant character. But during the challenge of Eight Doors Golden Lock Formation, he learns to overcome that issue and become equal partners as well as good friends.

As the only person who knows of Xiu's true identity, he does his best to help him hide it from the others. He once stated that no matter how fate had twisted things, Xiu is their older brother and that fact will never change.

Specialty:
Zhang Fei's weapon is “Zhan Ba She Mao” (戰八蛇矛 / Battle Eight Snakes Lance).

“Ba She Po” (八蛇破) and "Ba Shan Quan" (拔山拳 / Mount Ripping Fist) – Zhang Fei's special ability.

If anyone calls him “Xiao Nao Nao” (小孬孬) he will get so mad that his face turns black and his strength increases to an incredible level. After his wrath is expressed, he will revert to his normal state with no memory of what happened when his face turned black.

His face turns black when his anger maximizes after someone calls him "Xiao Nao Nao" (小孬孬). By then, his strength will expand to an unexpected point, which even surpasses that of Zhao Yun, who is supposed to be stronger than he is when he is in his normal state. Once his anger is expressed, however, his face will return to normal and he recalls no memory of what happened while he was "angry".

In the 15th round, he demonstrates a powerful attack called "Hei Feng Pi Li Quan" (黑風霹靂拳).

According to the character's biography on GTV.com, Zhang Fei's strongest attack is called "Ba She Po" (八蛇破).

=== Zhao Yun (趙雲) ===
Five Tiger General: 3rd.
Courtesy name: Zhao Zilong (趙子龍).
School year: Freshman.
Birthdate: Silver Dimensional Year 4333, February 15.
Age: 17 years old.
Species: Original Power-user of Wind.
Aura: White.
Status: Alive.
Fighting Power Points: 20000+
Original counterpart: Zhao Yun
Actor: Benji (班傑) – Wu Hu Jiang (武虎將).

Biography:
Good-looking and graceful mannered.

Although Zhao Yun is listed as the third Tiger General, his power is actually almost equal to Guan Yu’s.

Zhao Yun has been so attractive to girls since childhood that he grabs attention from every girl at sight, except Diao Chan. But once his sight turns away, their hearts will break... literally.

When Dong Zhuo tricked the Generals into a trap, Zhao Yun was stored with the device "Lock Maria," and his power was locked away for a short period of time until his friends found the remote that could remove the device's hold on him. After his power was restored, he removed the cloth on his head.

- Friendship:

Initially, he does not get along with Guan Yu, and mostly shows dislike towards Zhang Fei; but after facing a challenge together, they learn to overcome their problems and becomes friends, though Zhang Fei still likes to embarrass him when he is around a girl.

- Love life:

Zhao Yun seems to have a fondness in Xiao Qiao, but he tries to hide it.
When Xiao Qiao casts a spell to teleport Zhao Yun and his friends away, he tries to stay behind to protect her but gets teleported before he could leave the crowd. Once the teleportation is complete, he worries for Xiao Qiao's safety more than any of them. As more time passes, he becomes increasingly close to Xiao Qiao. And his affection of her is assumed to be love, though he stated that he is fond of Xiao Qiao as a sister.

Specialty:
Zhao Yun's weapon is “Zhui Feng Xi Yin Qiang” (追風洗銀槍 / Wind Following Silver Cleansing Spear). As depicted from the name, it moves as fast as wind if not faster.

In the 15th episode, Zhao Yun demonstrates two powerful attacks called "Pan Long Ti" (盤龍踢) and "Long Xin Taichi" (龍形太極).

Because Zhao Yun is an "original power-user of wind" (風的原位異能行者), he can combine forces with Xiu to boost their powers. But he is unaware of this information himself.

According to the character's biography on GTV.com, Zhao Yun's strongest attack is called "Feng Qi Yun Yong" (風起雲勇).

=== Ma Chao (馬超) ===
Five Tiger General: 4th.
Courtesy name: Ma Mengqi (馬孟起).
School year: Freshman.
Birthdate: Silver Dimensional Year 4333, June 13.
Age: 17 years old.
Species: Power-user.
Status: Alive.
Fighting Power Points: 18000+
Original counterpart: Ma Chao
Actor: Shao Xiang (邵翔) – Wu Hu Jiang (武虎將).

Biography:
Born in a family of powerful warriors. His grandfather is the founder of Guo Jia Wu Xue Zhi Liao Guan (國家武學資料館 / National Wushu Information House); and his mother is the author of Ha Li Po Te Yu Gong Fu Wang Zi (哈力波特與功夫王子 / Harry Potter and the Kung-Fu Prince).

Like Ding Xiao Yu from the Gold Dimension, he doesn't like violence, and only offers the opponent to hit him three times in order to bore him out. This is because he blamed himself for killing his best friend, Bo Ren, when they practiced wushu. Afterward, it was found out that he did not exactly kill his friend, but only caused him a heart attack that killed him afterward.

Though he is only the Fourth Tiger General, his strength rivals that of Guan Yu and Zhang Fei.

After the Five Tiger Generals broke through the Eight Doors Golden Lock Formation, he enrolled the East Han Academy with Huang Zhong.

- Hobbies:

Ma Chao has an interest in surfing.

- Friendship:

Ma Chao has been friends with Huang Zhong before their encounter with Guan Yu, Zhang Fei and Zhao Yun.

During childhood, he had a good friend named Bo Ren, who died of a heart attack when they were testing each other's kung fu and Ma Chao accidentally severely injured him such that he had to be sent to a hospital, where he later died.

Specialty:
Ma Chao's weapon is “Piao Qi Xuan Tie Qiang” (驃騎玄鐵槍 / Mounted Steed Deep Iron Spear).

Ma Chao specializes an ability called "Cotton Candy Sweet Sweet Fist" (棉花甜甜拳) to counter strong physical attacks. However, if someone uses a soft method, such as taichi, he can easily be overpowered. He initially utilizes this power to make his body soft as cotton, but from the 15th round onward, he begins to utilize it to create a cloud to attack his opponents. It was mentioned by Zhang Fei in the 2nd round that he can at least withstand two hundred people's physical attacks.

“Xu Mi Quan” (虛彌拳) – Ma Chao's primary ability was inherited from his family. One hit from this attack corresponds to thousands of punches. Although this is his most powerful attack, he has never used it after hitting Bo Ren with it.

=== Huang Zhong ===
Five Tiger General: 5th .
Courtesy name: Huang Hansheng(黃漢升).
School year: Freshman.
Birthdate: Silver Dimensional Year 4332, January 17.
Age: 18 years old.
Species: Power-user.
Status: Alive.
Fighting Power Points: 17000+
Original counterpart: Huang Zhong
Actor: Wes (宏正) – Wu Hu Jiang (武虎將) / SpeXial.

Biography:
An excellent arrow shooter. He can listen to the winds to find directions.

Having no family of his own, Huang Zhong values his relationship with the Five Tiger Generals more than any of them.

After breaking the Eight Doors Golden Lock Formation, he enrolled the East Han Academy with Ma Chao as students.

Huang Zhong was taken to an orphanage at the age of three. Because he never got to know his parents, he had always wondered what they looked like and why they had abandoned him. Whenever the teacher told him to make projects that involves "family", he would feel extremely depressed.

- Reunion with his mother:

After years of separation, he finally reunites with his mother, only to find out that she is a member of Huang Jin High School: one of the worst, most devilish institutions in the Silver Dimension. When he was spotted with his mother by Dong Han Report, his relationship to his mother was exposed and he was forced to see lesser with his mother to avoid complications. At first he was doubtful if she really was his mother because of her fierce attitude, but later warms up to the idea.

When Dong Zhuo forced him to fight his own mother, he became extremely doubtful as he could not bear to hurt her. He would jump in front of his mother's way to protect her from harm.

It was later revealed that his mom had only joined Huang Jin to work as a spy for the Nationwide School Union. Knowing that his mother had always loved him, he acknowledges that all negative feelings had turned into happy ones.

- Friendship:

Huang Zhong has been friends with Ma Chao since before he met Guan Yu, Zhang Fei and Zhao Yun.

Specialty:
Huang Zhong's weapon is a metal glove with an electronic crossbow attached to his arm named “Yu Tian Gong” (御天弓 / Chariot of Heaven Bow). Sometimes, he uses “Bing Po Yin Jian” (冰魄銀箭 / Ice Vigor Silver Arrow) to attack his enemies, which comes in two sizes-One that fits his arm length and another that is like any ordinary bow, both seems to be metallic. These arrows disappear after they impact. On demanding situations, he utilizes a larger arrow bow named "Frightening Sun Shot Bow" (驚天射日弓) to attack his enemies from a distance. When he uses this weapon, his ice arrows are also enlarged.

Huang Zhong has an unusually slow respiration rate and pulse, and cannot be easily affected with toxic air.

According to the character biography on GTV.com, Huang Zhong's ultimate attack is Yu Tian Shi Er Nian Fa (御天十二連發).

== Dong Cheng Wei (東城衛) ==
=== Xiu (脩) / Liu Bei (劉備) ===
Full name: Hu Yan Gioro Xiu (呼延覺羅脩).
School year: Freshman.
Age: 22 years old.
Species: Original Power-user of Wind.
Aura: Orange-Yellow.
Status: Alive.
Fighting Power Points: 35000+ -> 19000+ (due to cross dimension)
Actor: Shu Chen (陳德修) – Dong Cheng Wei (東城衛).

Biography:
Xiu is a power-user from the Iron Dimension (鐵時空), and the leader as well as main guitarist of his music band, Dong Cheng Wei (東城衛). Because of a fateful twist of events, he wound up in the Silver Dimension and assumed the identity of Liu Bei. As he spends more time there, he realizes the Silver Dimension is somehow connected to the Romance of the Three Kingdoms as most events and people seemed to be connected to that story.

Because he prohibited from using his powers at any time, he has a hard time hiding them when he is in a bind.

Having learned a lot about Romance of the Three Kingdoms, Xiu possesses knowledge of Guan Yu and the others' characteristics and future, but struggles to keep it hidden from them.

As he spends more time in the Silver Dimension, he forms a strong bond with Guan Yu and the others. Later, he becomes willing to help them dominate the world and bring peace to it.

- Love life:

He has fallen for Jiangdong High School's Sun Shang Xiang, as this is shown when he became unusually happy when he heard that Shang Xiang had transferred to the East Han Academy. However, things are rather complicated as they are from two different worlds, literally. His problems worsen when he finds out that Ah Xiang (the nickname she is known by) had agreed to a wedding arrangement many years ago, causing Xiu to suffer from love sickness after she returned to Jiangdong High School. The two of them are reunited once he decides to infiltrate her family's landmark to save her from her wedding with Yuan Shao. When he was chosen to go to Hedong for war, he confessed to Ah Xiang about his feelings. Later, when the real Liu Bei came back, he has no choice but to leave Ah Xiang. Thankfully, Liu Bei was once again attacked by Lu Bu and Xiu was allowed to stay longer in the Silver Dimension, however, his actions will be punishable when the time to leave comes again.

In episode 47, Sun Jian allowed him to be engaged to Shang Xiang, however, he have to go through a test, to beat Sun Quan in an archery test. However, on the last shoot, he purposely make his shoot slower so he could lose. Later, he confessed to Shang Xiang about his real identity.

Earlier in The X-Family, Xiu fell for another girl named Han (寒), but because she was in love with Xia Tian (夏天) and he wanted to focus on his duties, he kept his feelings a secret. Eventually, those feelings died out before they began.

Nicknames:
Da Ge (大哥 / Big Brother) by Guan Yu, Zhang Fei, and the other Tiger Generals.

Sun Shang Xiang addresses him as "Ah De" (阿德); later "Bei Bei" (備備).

Connections to KO One and The X-Family:
Xiu has appeared in both KO One and The X-Family as cameo and support roles, respectively.

Specialty:
All members from Xiu's family specialize a spell called "She Xin Shu" (攝心術): it enables them to control their target's actions. He can also use sound waves of musical instruments to increase other people's powers.

Xiu has two weapons: one of them is a guitar pick called “Shen Feng Pi Ke” (神風鎞克 / Divine Wind Guitar Pick) that increases his powers and produce healing energy: the other is being a yellow electric guitar called "Little Wasp" (小黃蜂) to create various forms of musical atmospheres in battle. On one occasion, Zuo Ci lent him a more powerful guitar called “Qing Hong Zi Dian” (青虹紫電 / Clear Rainbow Purple Lightning) to aid him in his battle against Dong Zhuo.

Xiu is an "original power-user of wind" (風的原位異能行者) in his dimension and can therefore combine forces with Zhao Yun, who is also an original power-user of wind in the Silver Dimension.

He is fairly good in archery, and was commented by Sun Quan to have excellent hearing strength, and having the ability to detect air movements.

Alternate counterpart:
Xiu's alternate counterpart in the Silver Dimension is Liu Bei. He is forced to impersonate the real Liu Bei after he got fatally injured and needed medical treatment, placing him in a position he's never imagined before: to be a leader and run an army of his own.

His involvement is part of what triggered the story in the first place.

=== Deng (鐙) ===
Status: Alive.
Species: Power-user.
Fighting Power Points: 20000+
Actor: Dun Deng (鄧樺敦)- Dong Cheng Wei (東城衛).

Biography:
Xiu's partner from the Iron Dimension (鐵時空). After Xiu takes Liu Bei's identity, he, along with Ming and Jie, becomes his only connection to his home world.

Specialty:

His true capabilities are unknown, but he can use sound waves of musical instruments to increase other people's powers.

=== Ming (冥) ===
Status: Alive.
Species: Power-user.
Fighting Power Points: 20000+
Actor: Ming Li (李明翰)- Dong Cheng Wei (東城衛).

Biography:
Xiu's partner from the Iron Dimension (鐵時空). After Xiu takes Liu Bei's identity, he, along with Deng and Jie, becomes his only connection to his home world.

Specialty:

His true capabilities are unknown, but he can use sound waves of musical instruments to increase other people's powers.

=== Jie (戒) ===
Status: Alive.
Species: Power-user.
Fighting Power Points: 20000+
Actor: Michael Chen (陳志介) - Dong Cheng Wei (東城衛).

Biography:
Xiu's partner from the Iron Dimension (鐵時空). After Xiu takes Liu Bei's identity, he, along with Ming and Deng, becomes his only connection to his home world.

Specialty:

His true capabilities are unknown, but he can use sound waves of musical instruments to increase other people's powers.

== Other Students ==
=== Liu Bei (劉備) ===
Courtesy name: Liu Xuande (劉玄德).
School year: Freshman.
Birthdate: Silver Dimension Year 4332, February 29.
Age: 19 years old.
Species: Power-user.
Status: Alive.
Fighting Power Points: 8000+ (Given power by Da Dong, Ya Se and Xiao Yu to travel through dimensions)
Original counterpart: Liu Bei
Actor: Shu Chen (陳德修) – Dong Cheng Wei (東城衛).

Biography:
The eldest sworn brother of Guan Yu (關羽) and Zhang Fei (張飛). He is a descendant of the royal family.

Although he appears to be righteous, he is actually extremely selfish. He only becomes sworn brothers with Guan Yu (關羽) and Zhang Fei (張飛) in hopes of using them as pawns to achieve his ambition in dominating the schools and becoming the most powerful person in the Silver Dimension.

The moment he swears his vows a gigantic rock (caused by Da Dong's (大東) coin) falls down on him, severely injuring him before he could execute his evil plans. To maintain the balance of the universe, Zhang Fei (張飛), Da Dong (大東), Ya Se (亞瑟) and Xiao Yu (小雨) force Xiu (脩) to remain in the Silver Dimension, thereupon taking Liu Bei's place, while Da Dong (大東), Ya Se (亞瑟) and Xiao Yu (小雨) take Liu Bei to the Gold Dimension (金時空) for treatment of his wounds.

This is how the story of K.O.3an Guo (終極三國) begins.

Return
Liu Bei returns to the Silver dimension (銀時空) in Episode 28. He attempts to take back his identity from Xiu (脩) and continue where his plans left off. He tried to join forces with Lu Bu (呂布), only to get double-crossed and assassinated by him. Ming (冥) finds him in time to take him back to the Iron Dimension (鐵時空) to renew his treatment.

Specialty:
As he sells fake items for a living, his eyes can never be fooled. He can easily distinguish between a fake and genuine object. Liu Bei never demonstrated any of his powers, but he is known to be powerful enough to cross dimensions.

Alternate counterpart:
Liu Bei has one alternate counterpart introduced throughout the Zhong Ji (終極) series:

In the Iron Dimension: Xiu (脩) leader and lead guitarist of the magical music band called “Dong Cheng Wei” (東城衛) from the first and second series KO One (終極一班) and The X-Family (終極一家).

=== Diao Chan (貂蟬) ===
School year: Freshman.
Birthdate: Silver Dimensional Year 4333, June 25.
Age: 17 years old.
Species: Muggle.
Status: Alive.
Original counterpart: Diao Chan
Actress: Kirsten Ren (任容萱).

Biography:
The adopted daughter of East Han Academy's headmaster. She is considered as the most beautiful girl in all the land. With her beauty comes a kind heart. She is the true love of Lu Bu.

Though she is born with a natural beauty, she dislikes people who fall in love with others based on their appearance.

Unlike most girls, who fall for men with power and position, Diao Chan dreams of finding a man who could give her safety.

She falls into depression after her father fell in a comatose state, but remains strong and cheerful in front of her friends. When her father finally awakes from his coma, Diao Chan finally cheer up for real.

After she was framed to have collected fake money coins from the students, she sells her house to pay her debts and becomes roommates with best friend Xiao Qiao.

- Change of personality:

Hua Tuo helps Cao Cao invent a potion to change Diao Chan's personality under Principal Wang's request. While it was still under production, it turned her into an aggressive character. However, once he makes a proper brew, she becomes more cheerful and optimistic. And, under the influence of the potion, she confesses to Guan Yu and they become a loving couple.

In 23rd Round, she begins to suffer side effects from drinking a warm Bian Hen Da (變很大), which induces her face with a red mark and later throws her into a deadly coma. Lu Bu manages to cure her with Zhen Cha Jing, thus removes all effects of Bian Hen Da.

Though she is supposedly cured, Ah Xiang suspects that the potion may have become permanent in her body.

- Love life:

After Lu Bu rescued her from a kidnapping incident, she falls in love with him instantly and the two begin dating after he transfers to her school. Their relationship falls to pieces when she finds out that Lu Bu is the adopted son of Dong Zhuo and that he was sent to rescue her as part of his father's plan to take over East Han Academy.

Diao Chan is also the figure of Guan Yu's crush. And though they have shown attractions to each other, Diao Chan prefers to think of him as a friend. During Lu Bu's absence, the two become increasingly close to each other. Then, Diao Chan confirms that he has become an important part of her life, although she has yet to figure out what that part might be.

While under the influence of a personality changing potion, Diao Chan confesses to Guan Yu and they become a couple. After she is "cured" of Bian Hen Da's side effects, she still chooses Guan Yu over Lu Bu. When she learned about her father's unexpected death and knowing the possible death that could befall Guan Yu, Diao Chan decides to participate in the battle. But because she knows her inability of kung fu practice gives her the most deathly disadvantage, she ends her relationship with Guan Yu by giving him a potion to erase his memory of her as a fail safe to protect him from heartbreak if she dies in the battle. However, she survives the fall and meets Guan Yu in the 53rd Round.

Nicknames:
Er Sao (二嫂) by Zhang Fei (張飛), Zhao Yun (趙雲), Ma Chao (馬超) and Huang Zhong (黃忠).

=== Xiao Qiao (小喬) ===
School year: Freshman.
Birthdate: Silver Dimensional Year 4332, April 26.
Age: 18 years old.
Species: Power-user.
Status: Alive.
Fighting Power Points: 12500
Original counterpart: Xiao Qiao
Actress: Wu Xiong (五熊) (Tsai Yi-chen).

Biography:
Xiao Qiao is a pretty girl who is best friends with Diao Chan (貂蟬), the two often discuss personal things together.

She has a hard time watching her mouth; for some reason, whenever she says something bad will happen it always does, causing everyone around to feel fearful and uneasy whenever she voices her opinions. Others often refer to this as Crow's Mouth (烏鴉嘴).

She sometimes involves herself with the Five Tiger Generals' (五虎將) missions.

Like any girl, she is attracted to men with strength and great ambitions.

She was a dancer two years prior to the show's beginning, but quit after her painful breakup with Zhou Yu.

- Love life:

She has a close friendship with Zhao Yun (趙雲). Their relationship begins to blossom when Zhao Yun loses his powers and she assists the Five Tiger Generals (五虎將) in reclaiming them for him. After his power is restored, they became closer to each other.

Xiao Qiao and Zhou Yu (周瑜) from Jiangdong High School (江東高校) had a relationship two years prior to the beginning of the story. Their relationship ended when she accidentally caught him with Da Qiao together, without knowing that they were pretending to be a couple to protect Sun Ce from his father's suspicion. Before their break-up, they owned a puppy named "Xiao Jin" (小瑾), named after Zhou Yu's courtesy name. Although whatever they had is over, Zhou Yu is still very protective of her, but she tries to ignore him at all costs. Whenever she finds her friends in trouble, she would first turn to him for help. Ah Xiang senses that she may still be in love with Zhou Yu, even though she doesn't know it herself. When Zhou Yu helped restore Guan Yu's lost powers and protected her from Dong Zhuo, it seems that her feelings for him begin to reawaken, if they were even gone at all.

Xiao Qiao is unaware that the student body president, Cao Cao (曹操) has great affection on her. Her closeness to Zhao Yun (趙雲) causes him heartache beyond her imagining. In the 28th Round, he finally works up the courage to confess to her, but she runs off in shock, not knowing how to turn him down without hurting his feelings. He then attempts to cheer her up by buying a puppy for her, but it brings up bad memories of Zhou Yu and the puppy they had before their break up. Eventually, Cao Cao decides to give up as a way to protect her from further stress. As time passes, they begin to grow closer to each other than before.

Specialty:
Xiao Qiao did not display any special abilities in the early episodes. However, she is widely known for her Crow's Mouth (烏鴉嘴) which frightens everyone around her.

When Xiao Qiao gets upset her physical strength seems to grow stronger.

It is later revealed that she displays fighting skills of her own and uses a pair of fans called "Leng Liang Feng Huo Shan" (冷涼風火扇) as weapons. She is the second person in the Silver Dimension to display the super-speeding ability. The other being Guan Yu.

During their break-in to Jiang Dong High School, Xiao Qiao learns a transporting technique (Wei Feng Zhen Zhen) from one of Xiu/Liu Bei's secret option bags. She occasionally uses it to transport people to her wanted destinations.

Alternate counterpart:
Xiao Qiao has an alternate counterpart introduced throughout the Zhong Ji (終極) series:

In the Gold Dimension called Cai Wu Xiong (蔡五熊) from the first series KO One (終極一班). Wu Xiong is the only notable person to have read the entire series of "Jin Bi Dian Long" (金筆點龍 / The Golden Pen Touches The Dragon) and therefore knows something about the future. She is also Ya Se (亞瑟)'s love interest.

=== Lu Bu (呂布) ===
Courtesy name: Lu Fengxian (呂奉先).
School year: Sophomore.
Birthdate: Silver Dimensional Year 4330.
Age: 20 years old.
Species: Demonic power-user.
Aura: White, later Purple
Status: Mentally broken.
Fighting Power Points: 22000 -> 25000~40000(after Demonization)
Original counterpart: Lu Bu
Actor: Kun Da (坤達) - Energy.

Biography:
Lu Bu is the adopted son of Dong Zhuo. He was sent to East Han Academy to spy on the principal under his father's orders to spy on Principal Wang and win Diao Chan's heart.

As a child, he was kept in the dark from the public world and no one knew of his existence until he comes to the surface.

His loyalty to Dong Zhuo changes when he falls in love with Diao Chan and decides to help the Five Tiger Generals to keep her safe. However, his feelings waver when he finds out that Diao Chan has chosen Guan Yu over him, which Dong Zhuo uses to his advantage to sway him to his side again.

- Taking the path of evil:

In the 24th Round, after Diao Chan falls into a deadly slumber, Lu Bu uses a demonized technique (Zhen Cha Jing) learned from his father to heal her. Though successful, she still chooses Guan Yu over him, thus makes him take on a path of evil.

After a long time of practicing Zhen Cha Jing, with addition of Hao Cha Jing; an advanced demonic technique, his evil instincts and powers increase to an incredible point. When he overhears his father and brother-in-law's conversation, he finally discovers Dong Zhuo's true ambitions and develops deep hatred for those who betrayed him, allowing his evil intentions to take him over in order to exact vengeance on his father. He secretly forms his own army as part of his plot to take everything his father holds dear to himself, including the throne of school union leader. However, he is unaware that his father is using his new siman to control him.

After Dong Zhuo takes over the imperial court, Lu Bu executes his plan to dethrone him, but instead he was double-crossed by his soldiers, who joined Dong Zhuo without his knowing. When the soldiers attempt to arrest him, however, he manages to escape.

During the battle, he observes from the side rather than participate. When he sees Diao Chan, the woman he still loves, and Dong Zhuo, the father he hates, fall into the ocean together, he loses his mind, along with his evil powers, prompting him to attack people anywhere he goes.

- Love life:

Lu Bu began dating Diao Chan after he rescued her from a kidnapping, though it was really a setup. Their relationship is ruined when Diao Chan finds that he is dating her because of his father's orders, but they reconcile after he decides to betray his father to save her and The Five Tiger Generals (五虎將). After he helped Diao Chan's friends awake her father, he regains her trust, but before she could thank him, she becomes a couple with Guan Yu, which devastates Lu Bu when he finds out. He respects her decision, however. He becomes furious when he finds out the truth behind her sudden change of personality and the side effects that follow, and he decides to win her back by healing the effects from her body. However, even after this, she still chooses with Guan Yu over him, thus breaks his heart again. From then on, he begins to take the path of evil, though he still retains feelings for her. It only takes her "death" to shock him.

Specialty:
Lu Bu's weapon is a spear called “Fang Tian Hua Ji” (方天畫戟 / Sky Piercer).

His special attack is “Hua Ying Teng Kong” (畫影騰空).

=== Cao Cao (曹操) ===
Courtesy name: Cao Mengde (曹孟德).
School year: Sophomore.
Birthdate: Silver Dimensional Year 4331, December 24.
Age: 19 years old.
Species: Original Power-user of Rain.
Aura: Blue.
Status: Alive.
Fighting Power Points: 20000+
Original counterpart: Cao Cao
Actor: Nylon Chen (陳乃榮).

Biography:
Cao Cao is a member of the royal family.

He is the student body president of East Han Academy (東漢書院). In the election against Lu Bu (呂布) for the position of student body president, his election motto was Say Cao Cao and Cao Cao will arrive (說曹操，曹操到 shuō Cáo Cāo, Cáo Cāo dào); a famous Chinese idiom. This line continues throughout the series.

His ultimate ambition is to dominate the world.

He thinks of Guan Yu (關羽) as a special kind of potential and hopes to become his friend.

Because Xiu (脩) / Liu Bei (劉備) is always mysterious about what he knows, he is very suspicious of who he might be. He even goes to the point of co-operating with Zhou Yu (周瑜) to discover who Xiu really is.

Though he is close friends with the Five Tiger Generals (五虎將) Xiu is troubled by the knowledge from the Three Kingdoms (三國), which tells him they may become enemies in the future.

He is known as the strongest potential enemy against the Five Tiger Generals (五虎將).

- Love life:

Cao Cao has a fondness for Xiao Qiao (小喬), showing jealousy when she gets close to Zhao Yun (趙雲) and taking every word she says to heart when she jokingly told him that he had a bad hairstyle. He then did all kind of things to make Xiao Qiao happy but to no avail as it only led Xiao Qiao to believe it was all the doings of Zhao Yun, which causes him to become heartbroken.

Specialty:
Cao Cao is an excellent strategist. He plans his movements very carefully to succeed.

Cao Cao possesses a very large library and has access to many resources, including Wikipedia. Using such resources, he is able to gather intelligence and act accordingly.

In the initial episodes, he never displayed any special moves, however, when his evil side appears, it is revealed to possess powers of his own.

Cao Cao's primary attack is "Long Zheng Wan Li" (龍征萬里), an attack that sends out powerful blue waves against his enemies. This power is known for blocking other people's powers.

In the 32nd Round, he demonstrates a new attack, "Long Pan Hu Ju" (龍蟠虎踞), while fighting Dong Zhuo and Lu Bu. This attack works by Cao Cao directing his palms outward; the energy swirls around in circular motions while flying toward its target.

=== Jiang Gan (蔣幹) ===
Courtesy name: Jiang Ziyi (蔣子翼).
School year: Freshman.
Species: Power-user.
Status: Missing.
Fighting Power Points: 50~500
Original counterpart: Jiang Gan
Actor: Zhang Hao Ming (張皓明). Monitor or Jin Bao San in KO One 1~5

Biography:
Class monitor and student body vice president. Likes to blackmail younger and inferior students.

When Dong Zhuo's (董卓) dominates the school, he joins the security squad at Cao Cao's request to spy on him and provide intel.

He is written off in the second season however, he has appeared in two episodes since.

Nicknames:
Everyone in class will repeat his name "Gan" (幹) especially after anyone mentions his full name, it's a pun on his name since his surname sounds like the word 講 meaning "to speak" or "say".

Specialty:
Jiang Gan specializes a move called “Xuan Feng Zhan” (炫風斬 / Dazzling Wind Chop) to call up harmless whirlwinds. He mainly uses it to lift up girls’ skirts, which elicits virulent criticism.

Jiang Gan also specializes a funny technique called "Chou Mei Quan" (臭美拳 / Stinking Beauty Fist), which indicates whoever gets hit by him becomes "beautiful", but at the same time emanates a stench that repels people. The more "beautiful" you become, the stench becomes stronger. "Chou mei" is actually a derogatory expression used to criticize those who are overly smug.

Alternate counterparts:
Jiang Gan has two alternate counterparts introduced throughout the Zhong Ji (終極) series:

In the Gold Dimension: Jin Bao San (金寶三) from the first series KO One (終極一班). He is also the follower of Wang Da Dong (汪大東), Xia Tian (夏天)'s alternate counterpart. They are both equally stupid and self-proud. Jin Bao San does not appear in the main story, but Ya Se (亞瑟) once mentioned that he had become Da Dong's personal bodyguard, making Da Dong extremely uncomfortable.
In the Iron Dimension: Ren Chen Wen (任晨文) from the second series The X-Family (終極一家). Ren Chen Wen is a friend/follower of Xia Tian (夏天) at school.

=== Sun Shang Xiang (孫尚香)/Yehe Nara Yu Xiang (葉赫那拉．宇香) ===
School year: Freshman.
Aura: Pink.
Species: Power-user.
Status: Alive.
Fighting Power Points: 16000 ->20000 (when having Devil Mind is back)
Original counterpart: Sun Shang Xiang
Actor: Pets Tseng (曾沛慈)

Biography:
Sun Shang Xiang, often addressed as Ah Xiang (阿香) by others is the daughter of Sun Jian (孫堅) the principal of Jiangdong High School (江東高校) and the younger sister of Sun Ce (孫策). When Cao Cao (曹操) and Guan Yu (關羽) were imprisoned under Dong Zhuo's (董卓) orders, Cao Cao's father asked for her father's help. He passed on the responsibility to Ah Xiang (阿香) because of her mischievous personality. After she succeeded her mission, she "transferred" to East Han Academy (東漢書院) as a new student.

Ah Xiang is the leader of her own team; Jing Xiang Tuan (勁香團).

Ah Xiang (阿香) falls for Xiu (脩) / Liu Bei (劉備) shortly after their first encounter. They become a couple sometime later.

It was later revealed that she joined East Han Academy because she wanted to escape an arranged marriage with Yuan Shao. She was brought back home by Zhou Yu and Taishi Ci, but she attempted to escape. Her brother and Zhou Yu plot to return her to East Han Academy and save her from Yuan Shao's marriage without having to become enemies with their family, and in the end, she is reunited with her friends.

- Love life:

Ah Xiang falls for Xiu / Liu Bei shortly after their first encounter. Eventually, they become a couple, but Ah Xiang remains unaware of his true identity. However, she is waiting patiently for him to tell her his story some day. In K.O.3an Guo Ep 47, Sun Jian allows Ah Xiang to be with Xiu provided that he passes the test to qualify that he is worthy as a method to further his plans, but Xiu hesitates at the last moment due to him being from another dimension. This causes Sun Quan to win, and he promptly reveals his identity to Ah Xiang

Nicknames:
Da Sao (大嫂) by the Five Generals.

Specialty:
Ah Xiang (阿香) has the ability to communicate through radio devices, such as radios or MP3 players. This ability is called "U-Pod". This is an ability from the Iron Dimension (鐵時空).

When she eavesdropped on Zhang Fei's whisper to Xiu, Xiu sensed someone using familiar magical powers, but was unable to pinpoint its origin.

In the 13th episode, Ah Xiang (阿香) demonstrates a defensive power called Da Bing Qi Ning (大兵氣凝), but Zhang Fei mistakes it for "Da Bing Qi Lin" (大冰淇淋) meaning "large ice-cream". It renders whoever she targets to become temporarily immobilized.
In the 15th episode, Ah Xiang (阿香) reveals her main weapon, a red arrow bow called Scarlet Flame Fairy (赤焰精靈).

- True Origins:

In the 50th Round, Ah Xiang (阿香) finds out that her parents originally come from the Iron Dimension, which makes her a denizen of the Iron Dimension as well.

=== Da Qiao (大喬) ===
School year: Sophomore.
Birthdate: Silver Dimensional Year 4330, April 26.
Age: 20 years old.
Species: Power-user.
Aura: Pink.
Status: Alive.
Fighting Power Points: 15000+
Original counterpart: Da Qiao
Actress: Tsai Han-Tsen (蔡函岑).

Biography:
Da Qiao is the elder sister of Xiao Qiao (小喬).

She is known as the most beautiful student in Jiangdong High School (江東高校). Although she is usually cool and calm, she becomes aggressive when she gets angry.

Da Qiao recently transferred to East Han Academy (東漢書院) to investigate the missing case of her boyfriend Sun Ce (孫策). When she finds out that Sun Ce is well and alive, she is told to stay in East Han Academy (東漢書院) for safety. Once Guan Yu (關羽) was exonerated, she shifted to the sophomore class.

- Love Life:

Da Qiao is in a relationship with Ah Xiang (阿香)'s oldest brother, Sun Ce (孫策): the student body president of Jiangdong High School (江東高校).

Specialty:
Like Xiao Qiao, she utilizes a pair of fans for weapons. However, her fans are made of metal.

Alternate counterparts:
Da Qiao has three alternate counterparts introduced throughout the Zhong Ji (終極) series:

In the Gold Dimension: Cai Yun Han (蔡雲寒) the 7th ranked KO fighter from the first series KO One (終極一班), who is just as independent as she. She is also the older sister to Cai Wu Xiong (蔡五熊), Xiao Qiao (小喬)'s alternate counterpart.
In the Iron Dimension: She has two alternate counterparts, identical twins named Han (寒) and Bing Xin (冰心) from the second series The X-Family (終極一家). Both of whom are descendants from a powerful family of supernatural female warriors. Their names also carry a similar meaning; Han (寒) means "cold", and Bing Xin (冰心) means "heart of ice".

=== Zhuge Liang (諸葛亮) ===
Courtesy name: Zhuge Kong Ming (諸葛孔明)
Status:Alive.
Species: Muggle.
Original counterpart: Zhuge Liang
Actor: Alan Ke (柯有倫).

Biography:
Zhuge Liang is a local teenage boy who is famous for his "wisdom" that which surpasses Zhou Yu. He is often seen with a black feathered fan in his hands. He is the second person to know of Xiu's true identity, along with Zhang Fei.

Prior to meeting the Five Tiger Generals, he dreamt about going to Dong Han Academy, but because he lacked the relation to royalty, he could only do it in his dreams. One day, while on his way home, he found five bandits attempt to kill his village's chickens: the most valuable foul in the country and made an attempt to stop them. He managed to distract them for three seconds before a chicken fairy comes to the rescue. As reward to his courage for protecting his kind, the chicken fairy gives him a potion that would make him smart.

When Dong Han Academy fell into Yuan Shao's hands, the Five Tiger Generals received an email from Zhuge Liang's cousin, who used the name Zhuge Liang and prompted them to search for him. After several odd encounters with the Five Tiger Generals and the representatives of Jiang Dong High School, they become convinced that Zhuge Liang is the smartest person on Earth, when everything he said and did were merely coincidental or misunderstood by others. After he helped the heroes take a part of Dong Han Academy back into their hands, he enrolls the school as he wished.

Zhuge Liang initially has hair to the length of his neck, wears a black bow tie, a white shirt and a grey jacket, and a pair of black shorts. He changes hairstyle after he enrolls Dong Han Academy.

=== Huang Yueying(黄月英) ===
Status: Alive
Original counterpart: Huang Yueying
Actress: Gui Gui (鬼鬼)

=== Wen Chou (文醜) ===
School year: Freshman.
Status: Alive.
Species: Power user.
"'Power:"'100
Original counterpart: Wen Chou
Actor: Qian Jun Xian (錢君銜).

Biography:
Jiang Gan's follower and one of the school's guards.

== Staff Members ==
=== Wang Yun (王允) ===
Courtesy name: Wang Zishi (王子師).
Age: 50 years old.
Species: Power-user.
Status: Deceased.
Fighting Power Points: 7000
Original counterpart: Wang Yun
Actor: Bu Xue Liang (卜學亮).

Biography:
The headmaster of East Han Academy (東漢書院): and Diao Chan’s adoptive father.

He is the one who dubbed Guan Yu, Zhang Fei, Zhao Yun, Ma Chao and Huang Zhong to the Five Tiger Generals (五虎將).

He was classmates with Dong Zhuo in elementary school.

When Yellow Turban High School challenged his soldiers in a hockey match and cheated their way to victory, Wang Yun decided to give up his position as East Han Academy's principal in order to protect his students. However, before he could do it, Dong Zhuo attacked him from behind, and landed him in a comatose state.

When Dong Zhuo attempts to have him killed, Ah Xiang moves him to a safe place. After missing out several episodes, he finally awakens, thanks to Guan Yu and Lu Bu.

Dong Zhuo puts him on the criminal wanted list to prevent him from returning to East Han Academy. Because of this, he is forced to live under Cao Cao's protection.

When he goes to visit Dong Zhuo after Dong Zhou has proclaimed that students no longer need to attend school, Dong Zhou ends up killing Wang Yun causing great distress for everyone, especially Diao Chan.

=== Dong Zhuo (董卓) ===
Courtesy name: Dong Zhongying (董仲穎).
Age: 50 years old.
Species: Demonic power-user.
Aura: Blueish-white.
Status: Missing (presumably dead).
Fighting Power Points: 35000 -> 80000(after an hei zhen jing)
Original counterpart: Dong Zhuo
Actor: Chen Bozheng (陳博正).

Biography:
Dong Zhuo is the principal of Hedong Institute (河東學院).

He is the adoptive father of Lu Bu. He plotted his son-in-law to kidnap Diao Chan and then let Lu Bu rescue her in order to win her heart and then Wang Yun's trust and enroll East Han Academy as his spy.

When the Five Tiger Generals lost a hockey match to Yellow Turban High School, along with their school, Dong Zhuo sent out his army to chase away the invaders; then took over East Han Academy.

He plots to become the new union leader of the school world, but has yet to succeed as he needs the primary object of a union leader to be able to do so.

- Life as a dog

Dong Zhuo accidentally swapped bodies with Zhang Bao's loyal hound when he attacked his master. He tried to switch back into his body, but all the experiments proved failure. For some reason, he and the dog disappear into thin air during one of their experiments, causing other things and people begin to disappear as well. This is something Ma Chao calls the "Mo Ki Established Law." "Mo ki" is a Taiwanese expression used to describe something as missing or non-existent.

- Evil Plans

It is later found out that he had learned an ability to control demons and use them to trap people in a worm hole, which is an alternative title to Mie in the Iron Dimension. In order to free everyone, Guan Yu, Sun Shang Xiang and Xiu (Liu Bei) agree to help him take the role of nationwide school union leader when the time is right.

He later plots to break the close bond between the Five Tiger Generals by asking to see Guan Yu whenever he wants and orders Guan Yu not to tell his friends what their conversation is about.

Nicknames:

- Cao Cao addresses him as "Dai Li Xiao Zhang" (Acting Principal).
- Li Ru and Mei Niang address him as "Wei Da De Dong Zhuo Xiao Zhang" (Noble Principal Dong Zhuo).

Specialty:
Dong Zhuo has a weapon called “Shen Wu Xiu Luo” (神舞修羅).

“Wu Min Yang Wang” (吾民仰望) – Dong Zhuo's special ability.

"Wu Gui Ban Yun Jue" (五鬼搬運訣) - A spell to open a worm hole and release five demons to capture those he targets.

Alternate counterparts:

Dong Zhuo has two alternate counterparts introduced throughout the Zhong Ji series:

In the Gold Dimension: Wang Tian Yang, formerly known as the powerful assassin “Dao Feng” (刀瘋) and is also the father of Wang Da Dong from the first series KO One.
In the Iron Dimension: Xia Liu the playful grandfather of Xia Tian (夏天), Xia Yu (夏宇) and Xia Mei (夏美); and the head of the family in the second series The X-Family.

=== Li Ru (李儒) & Mei Niang (魁娘) ===
Species: Power-users.
Aura: Greenish white.
Status: Unknown.
Fighting Points 8000+ each
Original counterpart: Li Ru
Actors: Lin Zhi Xuan (林智賢) & Ye Hui Zhi (葉蕙芝)

Biography:
Li Ru and Mei Niang were servants of Dong Zhuo. They were ordered to invade East Han Academy using the Eight Doors Golden Lock Formation, but were stopped by the Five Tiger Generals.

Afterward, they transferred to Yellow Turban High School and kidnapped the East Han Academy principal's daughter, Diao Chan in order to force him into leaving his post as principal. However, they were stopped by the mysterious Lu Bu.

After their school stopped the invasion of Yellow Turban High School to East Han Academy, these two characters reappear as Dong Zhuo promotes to the position of East Han Academy's new principal.

It is later revealed that Li Ru is Dong Zhuo's son-in-law.

Alternate counterpart:
Mei Niang has an alternate counterpart in the Gold Dimension named Gu Wen Jing.

=== Sun Jian(孫堅)/Yehe Nara Si Ti (葉赫那啦‧思偍) ===
Species: Demonic Power-users.
Aura: Red/Purple (demonic powers).
Fighting Power Points: 140000-> 1000000 -> 0
Status: In Demon World.
Original counterpart: Sun Jian
Actor: Jack Na(那維勲)

Biography:
He is the biological father of Sun Ce and Sun Shang Xiang, and adopted father of Sun Quan, and the headmaster of Jiang Dong High School, now known as Dong Wu Academy.

He is also the younger twin brother of Ye Si Ren.

For the sake of world order and self-protection, he highly prohibits his children from finding true love in the Silver Dimension.

He is also the one who agreed to Ah Xiang and Yuan Shao's engagement when they were kids.

- Ultimate Plan:

In order to dominate both the Silver and Iron Dimensions.

Ye Si Ti restored his demonic powers and killed the real Sun Jian, his alternate counterpart in the Silver Dimension, to impersonate him. Sun Jian's son, Sun Quan, in sequent became adopted.

After seventeen years, he finally unleashes his evil side to execute his plans, and kidnaps his own daughter (Sun Shang Xiang) to do so.

- Death:

During the final combat, he sends out massive of powerful demons to fight his enemies.

When they all fail, he sends out his daughter, who is under his control.

She, however manages to regain her senses and attempts to talk him out of starting wars.

But the attempts fails when his uncle, Ye Xiong Feng, engulfes him with pure demonic powers, thus re-rises his evil ambitions.

His new powers allow him to trap everyone in a chaotic dimension until Xia Tian disrupts his power.

At the end of the battle, his powers are officially taken away by a combination of his enemies' powers and the "Soul Killing Poem" (弒魂之詩).

Devastated by his powerless condition, he rushes into the closing worm hole saying he'd rather be a dead man than a powerless man.

This act automatically ends his life.

Speciality:
"Qian Dao Wan Gua Jue" (千刀萬剮訣) - Summons two powerful muscular demons into action

"Qun Mo Luan Wu Jue" (群魔亂舞訣) - Summons six powerful demons (or demonic power-users) into action.

"Huo Yan Yan Yi" (火炎焱燚) - A dimension that is created by him.

Alternate Counterparts.

Sun Jian/Ye Si Ti have three counterparts.

The Gold Dimension:Duan Chang Ren and Hei Long

The Silver Dimension: Sun Jian

== Other characters ==
=== Yuan Shao (袁紹) ===
Courtesy name: Yuan Benchu (袁本初)
Species: Original Power-user of Thunder.
Aura: Blue.
Status: Alive.
Fighting Power Points: 18000-> 21000 (after eating 袁味覺醒)
Actor: Jerry Huang.

Biography:
Yuan Shao (袁绍) is the former student body president of Ru Nan High School.

He proposed to Ah Xiang when he was seven years old, but because she thought he was only kidding, she accepted it.

Years later, he tried to fulfill their agreement against Ah Xiang's wishes. However, his plan is spoiled by Ah Xiang's brother and the Five Tiger Generals of Dong Han Academy.

His little brother, Yuan Shu, made an appearance in 24th Round as the newly ascended student body president of Ru Nan High School while Yuan Shao becomes ascended to military field officer for the Nationwide School Union, commanding an army in the main city under general He Jin. His occupation was later moved to Li Ru after Dong Zhuo took over the imperial court.

When Dong Zhuo reigned the imperial court, he led the armies of 17 schools to defy Dong Zhuo. However, his plans were foiled by Sun Jian/Ye He Na La Si Ti and Cao Cao was sent to defeat him. Although Yuan Shao had a much larger force, Cao Cao managed to defeat him.

=== Sun Quan (孫權) ===
Courtesy name: Sun Zhongmou (孫仲謀)
Species:Original Power-user of Fire.
Aura: Red.
Status: Alive.
Fighting Power Points: 20000 ->22000 (when use 勁烺焰+)
Actor: Xiu Jie Kai. (修杰楷)

Sun Quan (孫權) is the second son of Sun Jian, principal of Jiang Dong High School, little brother to Sun Ce and older brother to Sun Shang Xiang.

He is known for doing whatever it takes to achieve his goals, including hurting those he cares for and killing people. People are therefore afraid of his words when he says the word "kill".

Because he has a crush on Da Qiao, he dived into the lake to retrieve the ring Sun Ce gave to Da Qiao because he does not want to see her sad. But due to this he lost his hearing and has been deaf for two years. Being a proud person, he does not want to let others know he's deaf therefore he mastered the skill of reading other's lips very clearly so as not to let others find out his secret.

Speciality:

Sun Quan has a passive ability to read one's liver condition (讀肝術).

He learned this skill by accident at a young age when he tried to master the power of telepathy, but because he did not know the correct positions of the organs, he ended up learning to scan a person's liver condition instead of reading a person's mind.

His main attack is to fire his opponent with a fireball called "Jin Lang Yan" (燼烺燄).

He can also use "Jin Lang Yan Plus" (燼烺燄+) to increase his power level to twenty thousand, which ultimately makes him a very difficult opponent to fight.

=== Hua Xiong (華雄) ===
Species: Power-user.
Status: Alive.
Fighting Power Points: 12000
Original counterpart: Hua Xiong
Actor: Lance Yu (余秉諺).

Biography:
Zhao Yun’s nemesis. He was sent by Dong Zhuo to challenge Zhao Yun at the gates of East Han Academy.

Though he manages to beat most of the student warriors, he is unable to beat Guan Yu.

Specialty:
Hua Xiong can produce heat energy. He also has a so-called invincible move called the Wu Di Feng Huo Lun but it is easily broken by Guan Yu.

=== Famous Doctor (名醫) ===
Species: Power-user.
Status: Alive.
Actress: Kay Huang (黃韻玲)

Biography:
The famous doctor is a skilled healer, able to cure any kind of disease and poison. However, whether she will cure you is very unpredictable as she has constant mood swings.

She once had a child named Bo Ren, but he died at a young age due to a heart attack caused by his childhood friend Ma Chao. She has blamed herself for being unable to fix his heart and Ma Chao for being reckless.

Years after her son's death, she was visited by Ma Chao and his friends when Guan Yu's arm was poisoned. However, she refused to treat his arm once she hears Ma Chao's name. Ma Chao solves things out with the famous doctor, and she eventually forgives him. However, she still insists on not treating Guan Yu's arm. This makes her only apprentice, Hua Tuo, take her place in curing Guan Yu. Knowing that she has taught Hua Tuo everything he needed to know, she retired and Hua Tuo became her successor.

Specialty:

The famous doctor doesn't seem to have any fighting skills of her own, but her sonic scream can wake up anything at nightfall.

=== Hua Tuo (華陀) ===
Courtesy name: Hua Yuanhua (華元化).
Birthdate: Silver Dimension Year 4332 or 4331.
Age: 18 years old.
Species: Muggle(?).
Status: Alive.
Original counterpart: Hua Tuo
Actor: Zheng Ziyu (曾子余).

Biography:
The medical apprentice of Famous Doctor.

He used his technology to fix Guan Yu's poisoned arm. Afterward, he requested his friends to be his subjects to run some medical tests.

Hua Tuo dreams of becoming a famous doctor, and has currently invented potions known as "E Mo Zhi Mu" (噩饃之木 / Bad Bread Wood) and "Yi Rong Yi Rong Yi Yi Rong Jiao Nang" (易容易 容易易容膠囊 / E-Shapeshift, Easy Shapeshift Tablet).

Whenever someone needs medicinal help, he becomes excessively enthusiastic to take the job.

Specialty:
Medical healing and treatments.

In the 7th episode, he is revealed to be able to communicate with animals, because he had been under Famous Doctor's apprenticeship since childhood and had the mountain's animals as his friends.

Trivia:

He, in the form of Diao Chan, is Guan Yu's first kisser.

=== Feng Chu (鳯雛) ===
Name: Pang Tong (龐統)
Courtesy name: Pang Shiyuan (龐士元)
Original counterpart: Pang Tong
Species: Power-user.
Status: Alive
Fighting Points: 15000
Actor: Ah Mai Er (阿脈兒)

Biography:
A guardian of an ancient script that contains information about the world of demons. He is most commonly known as "Feng Chu" (鳯雛 / Fledging Phoenix). He is a friend of Sun Shang Xiang. He agreed to help Xiu/Liu Bei and the others get back Sun Shang Xiang when she's taken away by Zhou Yu.

- Love life:

He has liked Sun Shang Xiang for nearly his entire life, and hates anyone who likes her, which makes it really difficult for the Five Tiger Generals and Cao Cao to ask for his help when they need his power.

Specialty:
He can teleport people from one place to another. However, he isn't strong enough to channel this power correctly.

Alternate counterpart:

He has an alternate counterpart in the Iron Dimension called Wa Ge.

=== Sun Ce (孫策)/Yehe Nara Yu Ce (葉赫那拉. 宇策) ===
Courtesy name: Sun Bofu (孫伯符)
Original counterpart: Sun Ce
Species: Original Power-user of Fire.
Aura: Fiery Red.
Status: Deceased.
Fighting Power Points: 25000~27500
Actor: Jiro Wang (汪東城) – Fahrenheit (飛輪海) / Dong Cheng Wei (東城衛).

Biography:
Sun Shang Xiang's older brother and the student-body president of Jiangdong High School.

He is very protective of his sister.

Sometime after he saved Ah Xiang from her unhappy marriage arrangement, he went missing while on his way to East Han Academy.

- Near Assassination:

In 24th Round, he was reported missing somewhere near Dong Han Academy when he was attacked by Lu Bu and Dong Zhuo's henchmen. He and Guan Yu, who were standing across each other, were blinded by a smoke and attacked by poisonous arrows. He fought back with "Yan Yang Zhang" (焰陽掌) and got Guan Yu injured by a poisonous arrow. After Guan Yu countered with his "Xing Tian Po" (行天破) attack, he went missing.

His lover, Da Qiao, ran to Dong Han Academy to avenge him, saying that he had died even though she didn't know if he was alive or dead. Sun Ce later informed her and the others that he survived but can yet appear.

- Love Life:

Sun Ce had been secretly in love with Da Qiao since childhood. Once they grew older, they started a relationship but kept it hidden from his father to avoid complications. He also gave her a ring as a symbol of their love two years prior to the beginning of K.O.3an Guo. Because his father wouldn't allow his children to be in love, they kept their relationship a secret. After he went missing, and later went out to war, he was restrained from calling Da Qiao. After winning the battle and preparing to return home, he called Da Qiao one last time before meeting his unexpected death.

- Death:

Sun Ce returned to Jiang Dong in one piece before his father sent him out to war. After spending months in the war, he finally gained victory and departed for Jiang Dong. Unfortunately, on his way home, he went face-to-face with death.

Nicknames:

- Xiao Ba Wang (小霸王 / Little Conqueror)
- Da Ge (大哥 / "Big Brother")

Specialty:
Sun Ce demonstrates a flaming attack called "Yan Yang Zhang" (焰陽掌), a powerful ability to produce fireballs and burst his target into flames.

Alternate counterparts:
Sun Ce has at least three alternate counterparts introduced throughout the Zhong Ji series:

In the Gold Dimension: Wang Da Dong the leader of Zhong Ji Yi Ban (終極一班) from the first series KO One (終極一班).
In the Iron Dimension: Xia Tian (夏天) and his alternate personality Gui Long (鬼龍) from the second series The X-Family (终极一家). Xia Tian is the current ultimate power-user in the twelve dimensions. He is the one who restored Da Dong's powers.
In the Bronze Dimension: Zack a well-known psycho killer sent to the Iron Dimension in attempt to make Xia Tian stronger from the second series The X-Family (终极一家).

=== Gan Zhao Lie (甘昭烈) ===
Original counterpart: Lady Gan
Species: Power-user.
Status: Alive
Actor: Lin Xiao Rong (粼筱蓉).

Biography:
Liu Bei's betrothed one.

=== Ah Biao's Wife (阿標嫂) ===
Species: Muggle.
Status: Alive
Actor: Ssu Jung (思蓉).

Biography:
coming soon....

== Champion (強辯) ==
=== Zhou Yu (周瑜) ===
Courtesy name: Zhou Gongjin (周公瑾)
Original counterpart: Zhou Yu
Species: Power-user.
Aura: Orange-Red.
Status: Alive.
Fighting Power Points: 19000
Actor: Yellow Cow (黃牛) - Champion (強辯)

Biography:
The student body vice-president of Jiangdong High School (江東高校) and the leader of his musical team, Champion.

He is known for being instinctive. Whatever his instincts tell him are always true. His great intelligence makes him an overly confident character.

- Love Life:

He has a history with Xiao Qiao.though they don't talk much, he cares for her more than he cares for his friends. He hides everything he does for Xiao Qiao to be happy. In episode 47, Xiao Qiao and Zhou Yu starts a relationship. In the final episode, Zhou Yu and Xiao Qiao were said to be engaged.

Speciality:
The full effects of his powers are unknown, however, Zhou Yu has been shown to be able to fuse his palms with offensive energy, allowing him to inflict more damage on his opponent during battle. He has also been seen to utilize the common powers of strong power-users; super-speeding and sensing the location of other people nearby. Like many residents in Jiang Dong, Zhou Yu has been trained to utilize powers and abilities associated with fire.

Like other supernatural music bands, such as Dong Cheng Wei, Zhou Yu can infuse his magic into music instruments to create supernatural atmospheres for various effects, such as disorientating the enemy, stripping an enemy's powers with a specific melody, etc. His instrument is electric guitar.

Zhou Yu can combine powers with his teammates to produce a powerful flaming attack called "Flame of Unity" (烈焰合).

=== Taishi Ci (太史慈) ===
Courtesy name: Taishi Ziyi (太史子義)
Original counterpart: Taishi Ci
Species: Power-user.
Status: Alive.
Fighting Power Points: 15000
Actor: Flower (小花) - Champion (強辯)

Biography:
Zhou Yu's partner.

He is likely to display a rude attitude towards other people, even to his superiors.

Specialty:
Taishi Ci can use musical instruments to create atmospheres with multiple effects, and produce a fiery attack called "Flame of Unity" (烈焰合) with his teammates.

As a soldier raised in Jiang Dong, he has been trained to utilize skills associated with fire.

=== Lu Meng (呂蒙) ===
Courtesy name Lu Ziming (呂子明)
Original counterpart: Lu Meng
Species: Power-user.
Aura: Crimson.
Status: Alive.
Fighting Power Points: 16000 -> 17500(when using 麻辣红油抄手) -> 18000 (when using 紅油抄手 超極辣)
Actor: Monkey (小猴) - Champion (強辯)

Biography:
An elementary student in the size of an adult.

He tends to be loyal to Sun Ce, who looks up to his potential.

Zhou Yu once commented that he is the only one who can overpower Sun Shang Xiang.

Specialty:
Lu Meng is known to be very special type of martial artist, able to adjust to powerful skills ever since he was young. He is commented to be able to surpass Sun Ce, if he continues to improve his powers. He has also demonstrated the ability of super-speed. He has demonstrated a powerful attack called "Ma La Hong You Chao Shou" (麻辣紅油抄手).

Lu Meng can produce musical atmospheres for multiple effects and combine his powers with his teammates to produce an attack called "Flame of Unity" (烈焰合).

=== Gan Ning (甘寧) ===
Courtesy name: Gan Xingba (甘興霸)
Original counterpart: Gan Ning
Species: Power-user.
Aura: Orange-Red.
Status: Alive.
Fighting Power Points: 15000
Actor: Cola (可樂) - Champion (強辯)

Biography:

A member of the Champion music band.

Speciality:
Like many other characters, he has displayed the abilities of advanced martials arts and super-speeding, as well as sensing. He can also infuse his fists with energy during battle.

Gan Ning can produce musical atmospheres for multiple effects and combine his powers with his teammates to produce an attack called "Flame of Unity" (烈焰合).

== The Iron Dimension (鐵時空) ==
=== Xia Liu (夏流) ===
Full name: Xia Lan Xing De Liu (夏蘭荇德‧流)
Age: 70's.
Species: Power-user.
Aura: Lavender.
Status: Alive.
Fighting Power Points: 20000
Actor: Chen Bozheng.(陳博正)

Biography:
Xia Liu is Xia Tian's maternal grandfather.

His senile trait makes him somewhat of a comic relief.

Jiu Wu assigned him to assist Xiu against the approaching dark forces in the Silver Dimension, along with Jie, Ming and Deng.

Specialty:
Xia Liu utilizes a pair of cymbals known as "Ke Mo Ba" for primary weapons.

He has the power to summon spirits for aid and to erase people's memories.

Alternate counterparts:
Xia Liu has two alternate counterparts introduced throughout the Zhong Ji series:

In the Gold Dimension: Wang Tian Yang, formerly known as the powerful assassin “Dao Feng” (刀瘋) and is also the father of Wang Da Dong from the first series KO One.
In the Silver Dimension: Dong Zhuo the villainous ruler and principal of Hedong Institute (河東學院).

== The Gold Dimension (金時空) ==
=== Wang Da Dong (汪大東) ===
Age: 22 years old.
Species: Power-user.
Aura: Red.
Status: Alive.
Fighting Power Points: 12000
Actor: Jiro Wang (汪東城) – Fahrenheit (飛輪海) / Dong Cheng Wei (東城衛).

Biography:
Wang Da Dong is one of the former protagonists of the first series: KO One.

He once lost his power in a fierce battle, but recovered it sometime later, thanks to his alternate counterpart in the Iron Dimension.

When he visited the Silver Dimension with his friends and accidentally caused a gigantic rock to fall down on Liu Bei, they forced Xiu to impersonate him until Liu Bei recovers from his injuries, because the two of them look exactly alike (they are alternate counterparts).

Nicknames:
“Big Brother Da Dong” (大東哥) by most people.
“Big Brother Dong” (東哥) by Jin Bao San.
“Egomaniac” (自大狂) by Ya Se.

Specialty:
Da Dong utilizes a weapon known as “Long Wen Ao” (龍紋鏊 / Dragon Tattooed Pan).

Alternate counterparts:
Da Dong has three alternate counterparts introduced throughout the Zhong Ji series:

In the Iron Dimension: Xia Tian (夏天) and his alternate personality Gui Long (鬼龍) from the second series The X-Family (终极一家). Xia Tian is the current ultimate power-user in the twelve dimensions. He is the one who restored Da Dong's powers.
In the Bronze Dimension: Zack a well-known psycho killer sent to the Iron Dimension in attempt to make Xia Tian stronger from the second series The X-Family (终极一家).
In the Silver Dimension: Sun Ce (孫策) the student-body president of Jiangdong High School (江東高校) and Sun Shang Xiang (孫尚香)'s older brother from the third series K.O.3an Guo (終極三國).

=== Wang Ya Se (王亞瑟) ===
Age: 22 years old.
Species: Power-user.
Aura: Light blue.
Status: Alive.
Fighting Power Points: 12000
Actor: Calvin Chen (辰亦儒) – Fahrenheit (飛輪海).

Biography:
Wang Ya Se is one of the former protagonists of the first series: KO One.

He is rich, powerful, and vain.

He once lost his power in a fierce battle, but recovered it sometime later, thanks to his alternate counterpart in the Iron Dimension.

When he visited the Silver Dimension with his friends and witnessed the incident on Liu Bei, they force Xiu to impersonate him until Liu Bei recovers from his injuries, because the two of them look exactly alike.

Nicknames:
“King Arthur” (亞瑟王) by most people.
“Narcissist” (自戀狂) by Da Dong.

Specialty:
Ya Se once owned a demonic dagger called “Shi Zhong Jian” (石中剑 / The Sword in the Stone). After his sword's essence lost control, he threw it away.

Alternate counterpart:
Ya Se has one alternate counterpart introduced throughout the Zhong Ji series:

In the Iron Dimension: Lan Ling Wang (蘭陵王) from the second series The X-Family (终极一家). He is the one who restored Ya Se's powers.

=== Ding Xiao Yu (丁小雨) ===
Age: 22 years old.
Species: Power-user.
Aura: Gold.
Status: Alive.
Fighting Power Points: 11000
Actor: Aaron Yan (炎亞綸) – Fahrenheit (飛輪海).

Biography:
Ding Xiao Yu is one of the former protagonists from the first series: KO One.

He once lost his power in a fierce battle, but recovered it sometime later, thanks to his alternate counterpart in the Iron Dimension.

When he visited the Silver Dimension with his friends and witnessed the incident on Liu Bei, they force Xiu to impersonate him until Liu Bei recovers from his injuries, because the two of them look exactly alike.

Nicknames:
"King of Endurance" (耐打王) by most people.
"Xiao Yu, the Extremist" (要命的小雨) by most people.

Specialty:
Xiao Yu uses his fists as weapons. His left fist's power is comparable to that destruction of an atomic bomb, while his right fist is ten times the power. However, if he uses his right fist, all of his energy will be released rendering him powerless for at least three hours before he could fight again.

Alternate counterpart:
Xiao Yu has one alternate counterpart introduced throughout the Zhong Ji series:

In the Iron Dimension: Jiu Wu (灸舞), also known as Meng Zhu (盟主) the ruler of the Iron Dimension from the second series The X-Family (终极一家). He is the one who restored Xiao Yu's powers.

== See also ==
- List of KO One characters
- List of The X-Family characters
