= K.O. 3an Guo =

Taiwanese television series

- Promotional poster
- Also known as: 終極三國 zhōng jí sān guo
- Genre: Fantasy, Comedy, Action, Drama, Wuxia, School
- Created by: Sun Fanjun; Lan Jinxiang; Lu Shiyuan
- Directed by: Ke Qinzheng; Cheng Donghan; Wu Jianxin
- Starring: George Hu; Xiu; Kirsten Ren; Wu Xiong; Bo Yan; Benji; Shao Xiang; Wes; Kun Da; Nylon Chen; Zhang Haoming; Pets Tseng; Huang Niu; Alan Ke
- Opening theme: "Dui Shou" by Qiang Bian / Wu Hu Jiang / Dong Cheng Wei (1-36) / Yi Zhan Zhi Zhan by Dong Cheng Wei (37-53)
- Ending theme: Gou Ai by Pets Tseng / Lei Le by Pets Tseng
- Country of origin: Taiwan
- Original language: Mandarin
- No. of seasons: 3
- No. of episodes: 53 (list of episodes)

Production
- Producers: Cheng Donghan; Chen Huiying; Huang Wanbo
- Production location: Taipei
- Running time: 70 mins

Original release
- Network: GTV / FTV
- Release: 27 February 2009 (FTV), 2009-02-28 (GTV) – 26 February 2010 (FTV), 2010-02-27 (GTV)

Related
- The X-Family; KO One Return; KO One; The X-Family; KO One Return; KO One Re-act; The X-Dormitory; Angel 'N' Devil; KO ONE: RE-MEMBER; K.O.3an Guo 2017; KO ONE: RE-CALL

K.O. 3an Guo (traditional Chinese: 終極三國; simplified Chinese: 终极三国; pinyin: Zhōng Jí Sān Guó) is a Taiwanese television series starring George Hu, Xiu, Kirsten Ren, and three out of four members of Fahrenheit as special guests, who starred in the prequels. The title is pronounced as K.O.-san-guo. It is the third installment of the Zhong Ji series; preceded by KO One and The X-Family. This series is a spoof of the 14th century Chinese historical novel Romance of the Three Kingdoms by Luo Guanzhong.

The series started filming on 24 December 2008 and wrapped on 21 January 2010. It was first broadcast in Taiwan on free-to-air Formosa Television (FTV) from 27 February 2009 to 26 February 2010 on Fridays at 22:00 and on cable TV Gala Television (GTV) Variety Show/CH 28 from 28 February 2009 to 27 February 2010 on Saturdays at 23:00.

== Synopsis ==
After they were kicked out from their 24th school for starting fights and couldn't find another school that would accept them, Guan Yu and Zhang Fei thought it's a God send that Liu Bei proposed to be their sworn brother so they could enroll into the prestigious Dong Han Shu Yuan, a school exclusively for royalty, on the condition that they pay for his tuition. Though they enrolled, it didn't mean they attended the class in peace because they must survive the school's death traps and hostile invasion from warring schools.

== Cast ==
=== Main cast ===
Character	Courtesy Name	Actor
Guan Yu	Guan Yunchang	George Hu
Liu Bei; Hu Yan Jue Luo Xiu	Liu Xuande none	Shu Chen
Diao Chan	none	Kirsten Ren
Xiao Qiao	Qiao Qian	Cai Yizhen
Zhang Fei	Zhang Yide	Bo Yan
Zhao Yun	Zhao Zilong	Benji
Ma Chao	Ma Mengqi	Shao Xiang
Huang Zhong	Huang Hansheng	Wes Lo
Lu Bu	Lu Fengxian	Kun Da
Cao Cao	Cao Mengde	Nylon Chen
Jiang Gan	Jiang Ziyi	Zhang Haoming
Sun Shang Xiang	none	Pets Tseng
Sun Quan	Sun Zhong Mou	Hsiu Chieh-kai
Zhuge Liang	Zhuge Kong Ming	Alan Ke
Da Qiao; Han (flashback)	Qiao Wei none	Tsai Han-tsen
Zhou Yu	Zhou Gongjin	Yellow Bull (Champion's 黃牛)
Lu Meng	Lu Ziming	Monkey (Champion's 小猴)
Yuan Shao	Yuan Benchu	Jerry Huang
Gan Ning	Gan Xingba	Cola (Champion's 可樂)

=== Extended cast ===
Character	Courtesy Name	Actor
Wang Yun	Wang Zishi	Bu Xue Liang
Hua Xiong	none	Lance Yu
Wen Chou	none	Qian Junxian
Pre-school teacher	none	Zhang Yongzheng
Zhang Bao (張寶)	none	Xiao Zhong
Wang Yun's wife	none	Soma Akane]
Li Ru	none	Lin Zhi Xuan
Mei Niang	none	Ye Yung Tang
Li Shi Zhen (李時針)	none	Huang Wanbo
Dong Cheng Wei-Deng	none	Deng Huadun
Dong Cheng Wei-Ming	none	Li Minghan
Dong Cheng Wei-Jie	none	Michael Chen
Famous Doctor	none	Kay Huang
Hua Tuo	Hua Yuanhua	Zeng Ziyu
Dong Zhuo (董卓); Xia Lan Xing De Liu	Dong Zhong Ying none	Chen Bor-jeng
Pub owner	none	Chien Te-men
Teacher	none	He Yuwen
Hockey referee	none	Jian Hanzhong
Lu Boshe (呂伯奢)	none	Xia Jingting
Veterinarian	none	Feng Yuanzhen
Taishi Ci	Taishi Ziyi	Flower (Champion's 小花)
Pang Tong	Pang Shiyuan; Feng Chu	Ah Mai Er
Sun Ce	Sun Bofu	Jiro Wang
Tian Feng (田豐)	Tian Xuanhao	Wu Zhen Ya
Feng Ji (逢紀)	Feng Yuantu	???
Teacher	none	Ba Yu
Xun Yu (荀彧)	Xun Wenruo	Jin Qin
Dian Wei (典韋)	none	Huang Tai-an
Xu Chu (許褚)	Xu Zhongkang	???
Niu Fu (牛輔)	???	Mario
Gan Zhao Lie	???	Lin Xiao Rong
Robber	???	Lu Jian Yu
A Biao Sao	none	Ssu Jung
Xiao Qiao's friend (flashback)	none	Wang Yi Wen
Huang Mei Tian (Huang Mama)	none	Yang Li-yin
Liu Bian (Emperor)	none	Shiang Bo Tau
Zhao Zhong	none	Shiue Chih Cheng

=== Special guests ===
Character	Courtesy Name	Actor
Wang Da Dong; Sun Ce; Xia Tian (flashback and voice)	none Sun Bofu none	Jiro Wang
Wang Ya Se	none	Calvin Chen
Ding Xiao Yu; Jiu Wu (voice)	none none	Aaron Yan

== Characters ==
Guan Yu (關羽)

Guan Yu is straight-headed, righteous and loyal. He is known for fighting around the world alongside his best friend, Zhang Fei, with whom he has attended twenty-four schools together (only because he always gets kicked out for starting fights). Eventually, he lands a place in East Han Academy (東漢書院) with the help of his sworn brother, Liu Bei.

Because of his honesty, he is sometimes taken advantage by his enemies. His friends are often forced to lie to him, which leads to unpredicted consequences.

Guan Yu will blush bright red for two reasons; when he is embarrassed or when he gets extremely upset.

He is the second sworn brother to Zhang Fei and Liu Bei.

He develops a crush on the principal's daughter, Diao Chan on his first day in school. They later become a couple.

Guan Yu’s weapon is "Qing Long Yan Yue Dao" (青龍偃月刀 / Green Dragon Crescent Blade). "Long Yin Tai Xu" (龍吟太虛) is his primary attack, but because its power is unlimited, he only uses it in battles when it is absolutely necessary.

Zhang Fei (張飛)

Zhang Fei comes from a very wealthy family. All gangster members are afraid of his wrath and would do anything to avoid provoking him, even to the point of pretending to be nice and polite.

With some help from his sworn brother Liu Bei, Zhang Fei manages to enroll East Han Academy (東漢書院) - where he can explore his abilities.

Whenever someone calls him "Xiao Nao Nao" (小孬孬) he will get so mad that his face will turn black, his strength will rapidly increase, and he will start attacking his bullies.

Zhang Fei and Guan Yu are childhood friends and have been expelled from twenty four schools together. When they encounter Liu Bei, the three of them become sworn brothers, with Zhang Fei being the youngest of the three.

Zhang Fei’s weapon is "Zhan Ba She Mao" (戰八蛇矛 / Battle Eight Snakes Lance).

Liu Bei (劉備)

Liu Bei is the eldest sworn brother of Guan Yu and Zhang Fei. He is a descendant of the royal family.

Although he appears to be righteous, he is actually extremely selfish. He only becomes sworn brothers with Guan Yu and Zhang Fei in hopes of manipulating them to dominate the schools and become the most powerful person in the Silver Dimension.

The moment he swears his vows a gigantic rock (caused by Da Dong's coin) falls down on him, severely injuring him before he could execute his evil plans. To maintain the balance of the universe, Zhang Fei, Da Dong, Ya Se and Xiao Yu force Xiu, his Iron Dimension counterpart, to remain in the Silver Dimension, thereupon taking Liu Bei's place, while Da Dong, Ya Se and Xiao Yu take Liu Bei to the Gold Dimension (金時空) for treatment.

Xiu (脩) / Liu Bei (劉備)

Xiu is a power-user from the Iron Dimension (鐵時空) who is the leader and main guitarist of the magical music band, Dong Cheng Wei (東城衛).

Xiu’s alternate counterpart in the Silver Dimension (銀時空) is Liu Bei. After Liu Bei is fatally injured, Xiu finds himself put in a position he’s never imagined before: to be a leader and run an army of his own.

His involvement is part of what triggers the story of K.O. 3an Guo in the first place.

The members of Xiu’s family specialize a spell called "She Xin Shu" (攝心術): it enables them to control their target’s actions.

Xiu has three special weapons:

One of them is a guitar pick called "Shen Feng Pi Ke" (神風鎞克 / God Wind Guitar Pick) that increases his powers and produce healing energy.
The other two being a pair of guitars called "Qing Hong Zi Dian" (青虹紫電 / Green Rainbow Purple Lightning).

Xiu falls in love with a girl named Sun Shang Xiang.

Diao Chan (貂蟬)

The adopted daughter of East Han Academy’s (東漢書院) headmaster, Wang Yun. She is known as the prettiest girl in the world, whose beauty comes with a kind heart.

She dislikes people who fall in love with her because of her appearance.

Diao Chan's wish is to find true love and eventually she encounters Lu Bu and experiences true love for the first time with the man who becomes the love of her life. Later, after realizing Lu Bu was not who she thought he was, she parts with him and starts dating Guan Yu.

Xiao Qiao (小喬)

Xiao Chao and Diao Chan are best friends, the two often discuss personal things together.

She has a hard time watching her mouth; for some reason, whenever she says something bad will happen it always does, causing everyone around to feel fearful and uneasy whenever she voices her opinions. Others often refer to this as Crow's Mouth (烏鴉嘴).

She sometimes involves herself with the Five Tiger Generals' (五虎將) missions.

She used to date Zhou Yu and has broken up with him.

Currently she seems to have a crush on Zhao Yun.

Zhao Yun (趙雲)

Although Zhao Yun is listed as the third Tiger General, his power is actually almost equal to Guan Yu's.

Every female is immediately attracted to him. Once he breaks eye contact with them, their hearts will break. Diao Chan is the only female to be unaffected by him.

Initially, he does not get along with Guan Yu and the others very well. Zhang Fei likes to embarrass him whenever he is around a girl.

Zhao Yun’s weapon is "Zhui Feng Xi Yin Qiang" (追風洗銀槍 / Wind Following Silver Cleansing Spear).

He might have a crush on Xiao Qiao.

Ma Chao (馬超)

Born to a family of powerful warriors, he is known for avoiding fighting. He always first lets his enemies hit him three times; he will accept defeated if they are able to strike him down, otherwise they must leave him alone. His refusal to fight is because he indirectly killed his best friend when he was a child. He has strength equal to Guan Yu even though he is the fourth Tiger General.

Ma Chao’s weapon is "Piao Qi Xuan Tie Qiang" (驃騎玄鐵槍 / Steed Mount Deep Iron Spear).

Huang Zhong (黃忠)

An excellent bowman who never misses his target.

His father was murdered and though he eventually learns that his mother is part of Huang Jin Gao Xiao (黃巾高校), an evil school.

Of all the Five Tiger Generals (五虎將), he is the only one with no family and therefore treasures their relationship more than any of them.

Huang Zhong’s weapon is a metal glove with an electronic crossbow attached named "Yu Tian Gong Bing Po Yin Jian" (御天弓 / Chariot Heaven Arrow Bow) and "Bing Pi Yin Jian" (冰魄銀箭 / Ice Vigor Silver Arrows).

Because Huang Zhong's respiration rate and pulse are slower than usual people, it's very hard for him to be affected by airborne toxins and poisons.

Lu Bu (呂布)

He is the adopted son of Dong Zhuo. His existence was a secret until Dong Zhuo decided it was time to reveal his identity, by plotting with Huang Jin Gao Xiao (黃巾高校) to kidnap Diao Chan and allow Lu Bu to rescue her so in order to get close to her father Wang Yun and help Dong Zhuo usurp the position of East Han Academy's (東漢書院) principal.

Though their relationship began from a lie, Lu Bu eventually falls for Diao Chan. Their budding relationship is embroiled in conflict when Diao Chan discovers that he is Dong Zhuo's son and the real reason he started dating her. Through this relationship, Lu Bu becomes torn between his father and lover.

Lu Bu’s weapon is a spear called "Fang Tian Hua Ji" (方天畫戟).

Cao Cao (曹操)

Cao Cao is a member of the royal family.

He is the student body president of East Han Academy (東漢書院). In the election against Lu Bu for the position of student body president, his election motto was Say Cao Cao and Cao Cao will arrive (說曹操，曹操到), which is the equivalent of the English idiom Speak of the Devil. This line continues throughout the series.

He has a crush on Xiao Qiao (小喬).

His ultimate ambition is to dominate the world.

He is known as the strongest potential enemy against the Five Tiger Generals (五虎將) despite being their friend.

Sun Shang Xiang (孫尚香)

Sun Shang Xiang, often addressed as Ah Xiang (阿香) by others, is the daughter of Sun Jian (孫堅), the principal of Jiangdong High School (江東高校) and the younger sister of Sun Ce. When Cao Cao and Guan Yu were imprisoned under Dong Zhuo's orders, Cao Cao's father asked for her father's help. He passed on the responsibility to Ah Xiang (阿香) because of her mischievous personality. After she succeeded her mission, she "transferred" to East Han Academy (東漢書院) as a new student.

Ah Xiang falls for Xiu / Liu Bei shortly after their first encounter. They become a couple.

Ah Xiang has the ability to communicate through radio devices, an ability called "U-Pod". This is an ability from the Iron Dimension (鐵時空).

In the 13th episode, Ah Xiang demonstrates a defensive power called Da Bing Qi Ning (大兵氣凝), but Zhang Fei mistakes it for "Da Bing Qi Lin" (大冰淇淋) meaning "large ice-cream." It renders whoever she targets to become temporarily immobilized. In the 15th episode, Ah Xiang reveals her main weapon, a red arrow bow called Scarlet Flame Fairy (赤焰精靈).

Jiang Gan (蔣幹)

Class monitor and student body vice-president. Likes to blackmail younger and inferior students.

Everyone in class will repeat his name, "Gan" (幹). His surname sounds like the word 講 meaning "to speak" or "say". Furthermore, "Gan" (幹) translates to "Fuck".

== Schools ==
Dong Han Shu Yuan (東漢書院)

Translated as "East Han Academy." This is currently the ruling school of the Silver Dimension. Because of that, many warring schools are out to invade it and claim its power to their own.

Staff

Wang Yun – principal
Dong Zhuo – acting principal

Students

Guan Yu – 1st Tiger General
Xiu (Liu Bei)
Zhang Fei – 2nd Tiger General
Zhao Yun – 3rd Tiger General
Ma Chao – 4th Tiger General
Huang Zhong – 5th Tiger General
Diao Chan
Xiao Qiao
Lu Bu
Jiang Gan – vice-student body president / class president
Cao Cao – student body president
Wen Chou
Sun Shang Xiang
Da Qiao

He Dong Gao Xiao (河東高校)

Translated as "Hedong High School". Their commoners once kidnapped elementary school students to make them their slaves.

Staff

Dong Zhuo – principal
Li Ru
Mei Niang

Students

Lu Bu
Niu Fu

Huang Jin Gao Xiao (黃巾高校)

Translated as "Yellow Turban High School". The founder, Zhang Jiao, is known as the strongest person alive (or at least in the Silver Dimension).

Staff

Zhang Jiao - principal
Zhang Bao
Huang Mei Tian

Students

Xia Hou Yuan
Zhao Yong

Yu Teng Gao Xiao (玉騰高校)

Translated as "Yuteng High School". This is Guan Yu and Zhang Fei's last school before they enroll East Han Academy.

Jiang Dong Gao Xiao (江東高校)

Translated as "Jiangdong High School". A powerful academy responsible in expanding the school landmarks. It was founded by the Sun family.

Staff

Sun Jian - principal

Students

Sun Ce – student body president
Zhou Yu – student body vice-president / leader of Champion
Taishi Ci – member of Champion
Lu Meng – member of Champion
Gan Ning – member of Champion

Nu Nan Gao Xiao (汝南高校)

Translated as "Nunan High School". A powerful school that co-operates with Jiangdong High School in expanding school marks. It was founded by the Yuan family.

Student

Yuan Shao – student body president
Tian Feng
Feng Ji
Yuan Shu

Nan Xiong Nu Gao Xiao (南匈奴高校)

Translated as "Southern Xiongnu High School". They teamed up with White Wave Yellow Turban High School to invade Hedong High School. When the armies of Jiangdong and East Han come together, their number minimized. Later, Cao Cao gave the principal a view of Hedong's supposedly wounded soldiers to make a compromise.

Staff

Wu Fu Luo – principal

Bai Bo Huang Jin Gao Xiao (白波黃巾高校)

Translated as "White Wave Yellow Turban High School". They teamed up with Southern Xiongnu High School to invade Hedong High School, but their army was defeated by Jiangdong and East Han shortly after.

Staff

Guo Tai – principal

== Groups ==
Wu Hu Jiang (五虎將)

Translated as "the Five Tiger Generals". A small group of East Han Academy's strongest warrior students that serve as their protectors and warriors.

Members:
Guan Yu (關羽) – Number One
Zhang Fei (張飛) – Number Two
Zhao Yun (趙雲) – Number Three
Ma Chao (馬超) – Number Four
Huang Zhong (黃忠) – Number Five

== See also ==
- KO One
- KO One soundtrack
- The X-Family
- The X-Family soundtrack
