= My Sassy Girl 2 =

- Film poster
- Chinese: 我的野蛮女友2
- Directed by: Joe Ma
- Written by: Choi Seok Min; Kim Ho Sik
- Starring: Lynn Hung; Leon Jay Williams; He Jiong; Abby Feng; Bosco Wong
- Release date: November 5, 2010
- Running time: 88 minutes
- Country: China
- Languages: Mandarin; Cantonese

My Sassy Girl 2 (Chinese: 我的野蛮女友2) is a 2010 Chinese romantic comedy film directed by Joe Ma and starring Lynn Hung, Leon Jay Williams, He Jiong, Abby Feng and Bosco Wong. The film is an unofficial sequel of the 2001 South Korean film My Sassy Girl. It was released on November 5, 2010.

== Cast ==
- Lynn Hung as Shangzhen
- Leon Jay Williams as Jianyu
- He Jiong as Zhikai
- Abby Feng as Yongzhen
- Bosco Wong as Yang Guo

== Reception ==
On BeyondHollywood.com, James Mudge said the film "offers up an hour and a half of surprisingly effective comedy, a few touches of romance, and lots of scenes of aggressive women kicking the hell out of considerably less masculine men".
