= Abby Fung =

Taiwanese actress and model

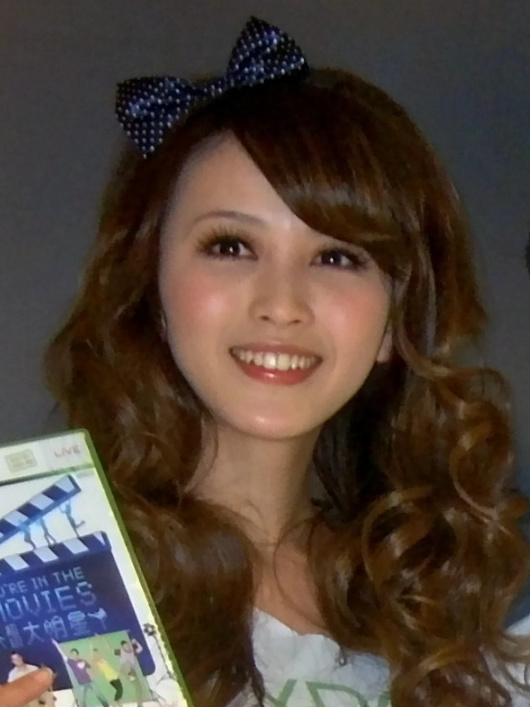
- Abby Fung in 2008
- Born: 30 October 1982 (age 43)
- Occupations: Actress, model

Abby Fung (Chinese: 馮媛甄; pinyin: Féng Yuànzhēn; born 30 October 1982) is a Taiwanese actress and model.

== Filmography ==
- Romantic Princess (2007, TV series)
- Justice for Love (2008–2009, TV series)
- K.O.3an Guo (2009–2010, TV series)
- Knock Knock Loving You (2009, TV series)
- Zombie Fight Club (2014 as Nana)
- My Sassy Girl 2 (2010)
- My Sassy Girl (2012, TV series)
