= Fahrenheit discography =

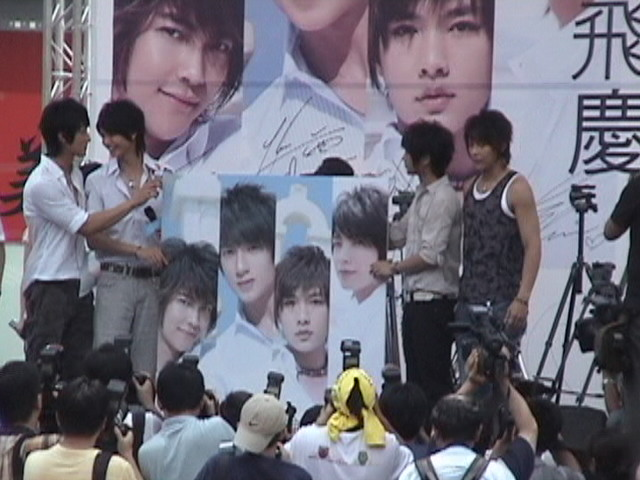
- Studio albums: 4
- Extended plays: 1
- Singles: 3
- Concert DVD: 1
- Soundtrack songs: 18

This is the discography of Taiwanese Mandopop quartet boy band Fahrenheit (Chinese: 飛輪海; pinyin: Fēi Lún Hǎi) who has been active in Asia since 2005. The group consists of four members: Jiro Wang, Wu Chun, Calvin Chen, and Aaron Yan. Their music is distributed by HIM International Music in Taiwan, by WOW Music in Hong Kong and by Pony Canyon in Japan. Fahrenheit are often associated with their seniors, S.H.E, who are also under HIM International Music.

== Studio albums ==
Title	Album details	Peak chart positions
Title	Album details	JPN
Fahrenheit (飛輪海 首張同名專輯)	Released: September 15, 2006 (TWN); Label: HIM International Music	95 (Note: Chart position is for the Japan edition of Fahrenheit, which was released on December 3, 2007.)
Two-Sided Fahrenheit (双面飛輪海)	Released: January 4, 2008 (TWN); Label: HIM International Music	80 (Note: Chart position is for the Japan edition of Two-Sided Fahrenheit, which was released on February 20, 2008 and is titled 2Faces.)
Love You More and More (越來越愛)	Released: January 2, 2009 (TWN); Label: HIM International Music	36 (Note: Chart position is for the Japan edition of Love You More and More, which was released on March 4, 2009 and is titled Touch Your Heart.)
Super Hot (太熱)	Released: September 17, 2010 (TWN); Label: HIM International Music	24 (Note: Chart position is for the Japan edition of Super Hot, which was released on January 7, 2011.)

== Extended plays ==
Title	Album details	Peak chart positions
Title	Album details	JPN
Fahrenheit Japan Complete Edition (飛輪海 Japan Complete Edition)	Released: January 16, 2009 (JPN); Label: Pony Canyon	76

== Singles ==
Title	Album details	Peak chart positions
Title	Album details	JPN
Stay With You	Released: May 21, 2008 (JPN); Label: Pony Canyon; Track listing: 1. "Stay With You"; 2. "Atarashii Su" ("新窩" [New Home] Japanese version); 3. "Stay With You" – instrumental 4. "Atarashii Su" ("新窩" [New Home] Japanese version) – instrumental	27
Treasure	Released: August 20, 2008 (JPN); Label: Pony Canyon; Track listing: 1. "Treasure"; 2. "Kimi Ni Yumenaka" ("愛到" [To Love] Japanese version); 3. "Treasure" – instrumental 4. "Kimi Ni Yumenaka" ("愛到" [To Love] Japanese version) – instrumental	18
Only You	Released: March 18, 2009 (JPN); Label: Pony Canyon; Track listing: 1. "Only You"; 2. "Deja u wo Mitsumeteru" ("恆星" [Shining Star] Japanese version); 3. "Only You" – instrumental 4. "Deja u wo Mitsumeteru" ("恆星" [Shining Star] Japanese version) – instrumental	14

== Concert DVD ==
Title	Album details	Peak chart positions
Title	Album details	JPN
Fahrenheit's Fantasy World Tour Taipei Special (飛輪海想入飛飛演唱会旗艦場)	Released: January 8, 2010 (TWN); Label: HIM International Music	54 (Note: Chart position is for the Japan edition of Fahrenheit's Fantasy World Tour Taipei Special, which was released on March 17, 2010.)

== Soundtrack contributions ==
Album information	Tracks contributed
KO One Original Soundtrack (終極一班 電視原聲帶): Released: December 27, 2005; Length: 57:38; Label: HIM International Music	Wandering Alone (一個人流浪) (insert song); "Teachable Child" (孺子可教) (insert song)
Tokyo Juliet Original Soundtrack (東方茱麗葉 電視原聲帶): Released: June 16, 2006; Length: 46:24; Label: HIM International Music	Only Have Feelings For You (只對你有感覺) – feat Hebe Tien (insert song); To Own (佔有) (Insert song)
Hana-Kimi Original Soundtrack (花樣少年少女 電視原聲帶): Released: December 1, 2006; Length: 56:55; Label: HIM International Music	Really, Really Like You (超喜歡你) (Insert song)
The X-Family Original Soundtrack (終極一家 電視原聲帶): Released: August 31, 2007; Length: 43:47; Label: HIM International Music	Superb (出神入化 Chu Shen Ru Hua) (opening theme song); Will Not Love (不會愛 Bu Hui Ai) (ending theme song); You are All My Memories (你是我所有的回憶) – Calvin Chen solo; Willing to Not Love You (願意不愛你) – Aaron Yan solo; The Side with Water (在水一方) – Jiro Wang solo
Romantic Princess (公主小妹)	New Home (新窩 Xin Wo) feat S.H.E (opening theme song)
Rolling Love (翻滾吧！蛋炒飯): Released: 13 June 2008	Shining Star 恒星 (opening theme song)
Mysterious Incredible Terminator (霹雳MIT)	Artery 動脈(opening theme song)
ToGetHer Original Soundtrack (爱就宅一起 電視原聲帶)	Love You More and More 越來越愛 (opening theme song); Silently 默默 (ending theme song)
Momo Love (桃花小妹)	Live In Peace 很安靜(ending theme song)
Love Buffet (爱似百汇)	Guardian Star 守护星 (opening theme song); Mistake 误会 (ending theme song)

== Other songs ==
Year	Information	Tracks
	C.C. Lemon Commercial Song	"C.C. Lemon"
	米奇节目嘉华	"Little VIP" (小小大人物 Xiao Xiao Da Ren Wu)
	Mengniu Yogurt Commercial Song	"Sweet & Sour" (酸甜 Suan Tian)" feat S.H.E
	Taisun Xian Cao Mi song	"Do Re Mi"
2009	Taiwan Tourism Bureau Theme Song (台湾观光局日韩地区代言主题曲)	"Touch Your Heart"
2010	Coca-Cola Shanghai Expo Theme Song (可口可乐上海世博会主题曲)	"快乐节拍123"
2010	Coca-Cola New Year Theme Song (可口可乐新年主题曲)	"第一口的快乐" (First Drink's Happiness)
	BLEACH4 (死神) (Taiwan only)	"Rebirth" (新生) - opening theme song

Others

- More Beautiful World 《比較美好的世界》 (Sichuan Earthquake) HIM All Star (Power Station 動力火車, S.H.E, Tank, Fahrenheit 飛輪海 （Calvin Chen 辰亦儒, Jiro Wang 汪東城, Aaron Yan 炎亞綸）, Yoga Lin 林宥嘉, Jeno Liu 劉力揚, One Million Star 星光幫) - 2008
- 《Gatsby I like it》 （Gatsby CF Theme Song） - 2008
- Happy Beat 123 《歡樂節拍123》 （Shanghai World Expo refueling song theme song）
- Pebbles and delicious gift to double 《畅爽加倍 更添美味》(Coca-Cola Theme Song CF) - 2009
- 《The Heart Of Asia》 (Bureau of Tourism Travel Fair in Seoul latest work Fahrenheit Taiwan landscape)
- Jiro Wang汪東城 For me 《替我》 （Purple House Movie Theme Song 紫宅電影主題曲） - 2011

== Collaborations ==
Album information	Tracks contributed
Play: Artist: S.H.E; Released: May 11, 2007; Length: 43:12; Language: Mandarin; Label: HIM International Music	2. Thank You for Your Gentleness (謝謝你的溫柔 Xie Xie Ni De Wen Rou); 12. Always Open (inclusive for the preorder edition)
我的電台 FM S.H.E: Artist: S.H.E; Released: September 23, 2008; Length: 52:48; Language: Mandarin; Label: HIM International Music	15. Sweet and Sour (酸甜Suan Tian)
