= Fahrenheit's Fantasy World Tour Taipei Special =

Fahrenheit’s Fantasy World Tour Taipei Special
- Fahrenheit's Fantasy World Tour Taipei Special (Black and White Edition)

Video 飛輪海想入飛飛演唱會台北旗艦場 by Fahrenheit
- Released: 8 January 2010
- Recorded: 24–25 October 2009
- Genre: Mandopop
- Length: 150:00
- Language: Mandarin
- Label: HIM International Music

Fahrenheit chronology
Love You More and More (2009)	Fahrenheit’s Fantasy World Tour Taipei Special (2010)	Super Hot (2010)

Alternative cover

Fahrenheit's Fantasy World Tour Taipei Special (Chinese: 飛輪海想入飛飛演唱会台北旗艦場) is Taiwanese Mandopop quartet boy band Fahrenheit's (Chinese: 飛輪海) first concert DVD album. It was recorded during the concerts held on 24 and 25 October 2009 at Taipei Arena, Taiwan. The album features songs from their first three studio albums, from their debut album, Fahrenheit in 2006 to Love You More and More in 2009, as well as other performances.

Two versions of the album were released on 8 January 2010 by HIM International Music in a two DVD format: Fahrenheit's Fantasy World Tour Taipei Special (Black and White Edition) (飛輪海想入飛飛演唱會台北旗艦場DVD 黑白風尚版) and Fahrenheit's Fantasy World Tour Taipei Special (Silver and White Edition) (飛輪海想入飛飛演唱會台北旗艦場DVD 銀白激帥版).

The album debuted at number one on Taiwan's G-Music Weekly Top 20 Audio/Video Chart (影音榜) at week 2 (8–14 January 2010) with a percentage sales of 24.32%. It peaked at number one for one week and charted continuously in the Top 20 for 14 weeks.

== Track listing ==
=== DVD 1 ===
1. Opening：Future
2. "出神入化" (Superb)
3. "我有我的Young" (I Have My Young)
4. Talking 1
5. "心裡有數" (In Our Hearts We Know)
6. "寂寞暴走" (Lonesome Sprint)
7. Rock Intro
8. "超喜歡你" (Really Like You)
9. "越來越愛" (Love You More and More)
10. Talking 2
11. "自由" - Jiro Wang Solo (Freedom)
12. Talking 3
13. "一個人流浪" (Wandering Alone)
14. Talking 4
15. "Ti Amo" - Aaron Yan Solo
16. "一路上有你" - Aaron Yan Solo
17. Old School Medley："My Girl" / "老實情歌" / "暗戀你" (Secretly Love You) - Cantonese song by Jacky Cheung / "Uptown Girl"
18. "不會愛" (Cannot Love)
19. "至少還有我" (At Least You Still Have Me)
20. Fighting Intro
21. "劍舞擊鼓" - Wu Chun Solo (Drum)
22. "不死之謎" (The Secret of Immortality)
23. "恆星" (Shining Star)
24. "最佳聽眾" (The Best Listener)
25. Fantasy Intro
26. "小小大人物" (Little VIP)
27. Talking 5
28. "Touch Your Heart" - Taiwan Tourism theme song
29. "愛到" (To Love)
30. Talking 6
31. B-Box - Calvin Chen Solo
32. "愛的王道" (Love's Royalty)
33. "夏雪" (Summer Snow)
34. "為你存在" (Existing For You)

=== DVD 2 ===
1. Encore
2. DJ Scratch & Dance - Calvin Chen Solo
3. "只對你有感覺" (Only Have Feelings For You)
4. "美麗新世界" (Genesis)
5. "新窩" (New Home)
6. Talking 7
7. "留下來" (Stay With Me)

==== Bonus ====
1. Fahrenheit's Fantasy World Tour Asia behind-the-scenes (想入飛飛飛越亞洲 幕後實錄)
2. Fahrenheit's Fantasy World Tour Main Theme (想入飛飛組曲)
