= Two-Sided Fahrenheit =

- Two-Sided Fahrenheit (Boy Edition) cover

Studio album 雙面飛輪海 by Fahrenheit
- Released: 4 January 2008
- Genre: Mandopop
- Length: 48:31
- Language: Mandarin
- Label: HIM International Music

Fahrenheit chronology
| Fahrenheit (2006) | Two-Sided Fahrenheit (2008) | Love You More and More (2009) |

Alternative Cover

Two-Sided Fahrenheit (traditional Chinese: 雙面飛輪海; simplified Chinese: 双面飛輪海; pinyin: Shuāng Miàn Fēi Lún Hǎi) is the second studio album by the Taiwanese Mandopop boy band Fahrenheit. (Chinese: 飛輪海) Two versions of the album were released on 4 January 2008 by HIM International Music: Two-Sided Fahrenheit (Boy Edition) (双面飛輪海 男孩版) and Two-Sided Fahrenheit (Men Edition) (双面飛輪海 男人版) (CD+DVD) with a bonus DVD containing 2 music videos and their making of footage. A Two-Sided Fahrenheit (Asia Celebration Edition) (雙面飛輪海 亞洲慶功版) was released on 1 February 2008 with a bonus DVD containing five music videos, Fahrenheit - Asia Storm footage, two music video behind-the-scene and album cover shoot making of footage

The album's preorder sales reached 50,000 in Taiwan. The album sold 150,000 copies from preorders and as of date, has sold over 350,000 copies in Asia. The album also topped the G-Music Combo Chart and the Mandarin Chart in its first week.

The album was awarded one of the Top 10 Selling Mandarin Albums of the Year, as well as the Highest Selling Mandarin Album of the Year at the 2008 IFPI Hong Kong Album Sales Awards, presented by the Hong Kong branch of IFPI.

== Album ==
- "小小大人物" Xiao Xiao Da Ren Wu (Little VIP) is Hong Kong Disneyland theme song.

It also features tracks from Taiwanese dramas starring members of Fahrenheit:

- "出神入化" (Superb) and "不會愛" (Will Not Love) - opening and ending theme song respectively of The X-Family. Jiro Wang performed "出神入化" (Superb) in the last episode of ToGetHer, starring Jiro Wang, Rainie Yang and George Hu
- "新窩" (New Home) feat S.H.E - opening theme song of Romantic Princess, starring Calvin Chen and Wu Chun
- "超喜歡你" (I Really Really Like You) - insert song of Hanazakarino Kimitachihe, starring Wu Chun, Jiro Wang and Ella Chen of S.H.E

== Track listing ==
1. "新窩" Xin Wo (New Home) - featuring S.H.E
2. "為你存在" Wei Ni Cun Zai (Existing for You)
3. "出神入化" Chu Shen Ru Hua (Superb)
4. "不會愛" Bu Hui Ai (Don't Know How to Love)
5. "Ti Amo" (I Love You) - Aaron Yan & Liu Li Yang duet
6. "愛的王道" Ai De Wang Dao (Love's Royalty)
7. "心裡有數" Xin Li You Shu (In Our Hearts We Know)
8. "明日香" Ming Ri Xiang (Tomorrow's Fragrance)
9. "至少還有我" Zhi Shao Hai You Wo (At Least You Still Have Me)
10. "一萬個快樂" Yi Wan Ge Kuai Le (Ten Thousand Joys)
11. "小小大人物" Xiao Xiao Da Ren Wu (Little VIP) - Hong Kong Disneyland theme song
12. "新窩" Xin Wo (New Home) - 男生宿舍版 Nan Shen Su She Ban - Male Students' Dormitory Version
13. "超喜歡你" Chao Xi Huan Ni (Really Like You)

== Music videos ==
- "新窩" (New Home) - featuring S.H.E MV
- "為你存在" (Existing for You) MV
- "出神入化" (Superb) MV
- "不會愛" (Don't Know How to Love) MV
- "Ti Amo" (I Love You) MV - Aaron Yan & Liu Li Yang duet
- "心理有數" (In Our Hearts We Know) MV
- "明日香" (Tomorrow's Fragrance) MV
- "至少還有我" (At Least You Still Have Me) MV
- "小小大人物" (Little VIP) MV

== Charts ==
| Release | Chart | Peak Position | Chart Run |
|---|---|---|---|
| 4 January 2008 | G-music Weekly Combo Chart (Taiwan) | #1 | 9 weeks |
| 4 January 2008 | G-music Weekly Mandarin Chart (Taiwan) | #1 | 12 weeks |

=== Singles ===
| Song | Chart | Peak Position | Chart Run |
|---|---|---|---|
| New Home (新窩) | Hito Chinese Charts | #1 | 1 week |
| Existing For You (為你存在) | Hito Chinese Charts | #1 | 2 weeks |
