= List of awards and nominations received by Fahrenheit =

This is a list of awards and nominations received by Taiwanese vocal quartet boy band Fahrenheit.

== HITO Radio Music Awards ==
The HITO Radio Music Awards (Chinese: HITO流行音樂獎) are given annually by HITO Radio, the parent company of Taiwanese radio station Hit FM. The order is not specified for the Top 10 Songs of the Year.

Year	Category	Nomination	Result	Ref
2007	Best Male Group	Fahrenheit	Won	
2008	Most Popular Group (popular vote)	Fahrenheit	Won	
2008	Best Original Soundtrack	Hanazakarino Kimitachihe Original Soundtrack (Note: This is a shared award for their contribution to the album)	Won	
2009	Best Male Group	Fahrenheit	Won	

== Hong Kong TVB8 Awards ==
The Hong Kong TVB8 Awards (Chinese: TVB8金曲榜頒獎) are given annually by TVB8, since 1999, a Mandarin television network operated by Television Broadcasts Limited.

Year	Category	Nomination	Result	Ref
2006	Best Group Award (Bronze)	Fahrenheit	Won	
2007	Top 10 Gold Songs	"超喜歡你" (I Really, Really Like You)	Nominated	
2007	Top 10 Gold Songs	"我有我的Young" (I Have My Young)	Nominated	

== IFPI Hong Kong Album Sales Awards ==
The IFPI Hong Kong Album Sales Awards (Chinese: IFPI香港唱片銷量大獎), formerly Gold Record Awards (金唱片頒獎典禮) is presented by the Hong Kong branch of International Federation of the Phonographic Industry (IFPI) since 1977. The order is not specified for the Top 10 Selling Mandarin Albums of the Year (十大銷量國語唱片獲獎).

Year	Category	Nomination	Result	Ref
2008	Top 10 Selling Mandarin Albums of the Year	Two-Sided Fahrenheit	Won	
2008	Highest Selling Mandarin Album of the Year	Two-Sided Fahrenheit	Won	
2009	Top 10 Selling Mandarin Albums of the Year	Love You More and More	Won	

== Metro Radio Mandarin Music Awards ==
The Metro Radio Mandarin Music Awards (Chinese: 新城國語力頒獎禮) are given annually since 2002, by Hong Kong radio station Metro Info. No order of ranking is specified for the Songs of the Year.

Year	Category	Nomination	Result	Ref
2007	Songs of the Year	"我有我的Young" (I Have My Young)	Nominated	
2007	Karaoke Songs of the Year	"只對你有感覺" (Only Have Feelings For You) with Hebe	Won	
2007	Best Group	Fahrenheit	Won	
2008	Best Duet	"新窩" (New Home) with S.H.E	Won	
2008	Best Group	Fahrenheit	Won	

== Awards by years ==
=== 2006 ===
- HK Metro Hits Awards, Best Foreign Newcomer
- 2006 Sprite Awards, Taiwan Region: Most Popular Act Award
- 2006 Sprite Awards, Best Duet Award: Only Have Feelings For You (只對你有感覺 Zhi Dui Ni You Gan Jue)
- 2006 Sprite Awards, Best Group Award
- KKBOX Music Charts, Top 20 Singles of the Year : Only Have Feelings For You (只對你有感覺 Zhi Dui Ni You Gan Jue)
- KKBOX Music Charts, Best Drama Soundtrack: Hanazakarino Kimitachihe Original Soundtrack (花樣少年少女 電視原聲帶)

=== 2007 ===
- Canada Chinese Radiostation Music Charts: Best Newcomer (Group)
- Singapore Hit Awards, Top 10 Songs of the Year (933醉心龙虎榜 年度10大金曲): Love's Arrived (愛到 Ai Dao)
- Singapore Hit Awards, Courts Best MV (Courts 最佳音乐电影): Love's Arrived (愛到 Ai Dao)
- Singapore Hit Awards, Most Popular Newcomer (最受欢迎新人奖)
- Singapore Hit Awards, Most Popular Act of the Year (年度人气大奖)

=== 2008 ===
- 2008 Roadshow Awards, Best Chinese Group
- KISS APPLE Love Songs Chart #1: Thank You for Your Gentleness (謝謝你的溫柔 Xie Xie Ni De Wen Rou)
- Mengniu Music Awards 2008: Fei Die Award
- SINA Music Awards, Best Group

=== 2009 ===
- 2009 Sprite Awards, Taiwan Media Recommendation Award
- 2009 Sprite Awards, Asia Pacific Region: Best Group
- 2009 Sprite Awards, Hong Kong and Taiwan Region Top Song: Existing For You (为你存在 Wei Ni Cun Zai)
- 2009 Sprite Awards: Best Performer Award
- 2009 MusicRadio Top Charts, Hong Kong and Taiwan Region: Most Popular Group
- 2009 MusicRadio Top Charts, Hong Kong and Taiwan Region: Most Popular Group on Campus
- 2009 MusicRadio Top Charts, Best Song: New Home (新窝 Xin Wo)
- 2009 MTV Music Festival Awards, Taiwan and Hong Kong Region: Most Stylish Group
- 2009 Yahoo! Asia Buzz Awards (HK): Performing Group

=== 2010 ===
- 2010 Sprite Awards, Hong Kong and Taiwan Region Top Song: Love You More and More (越来越爱 Yue Lai Yue Ai)
- 2010 Sprite Awards, Taiwan Media Recommendation Award
- 2010 Sprite Awards, Taiwan and Hong Kong Region: Best Performer Award
- 2010 Sprite Awards, Asia Pacific Region: Best Group
- 2010 MusicRadio Top Charts, Hong Kong and Taiwan Region: Most Popular Group
- 2010 MusicRadio Top Charts, Taiwan and Hong Kong Region Most Played Song: Love You More and More (越来越爱 Yue Lai Yue Ai)
- 2010 MusicRadio Top Charts, Taiwan and Hong Kong Region Top 10 Hits: Love You More and More (越来越爱 Yue Lai Yue Ai)
- 2010 Mengniu Music Awards: Best Group
- 2010 Mengniu Music Awards, Most Played Song: Love You More and More (越来越爱 Yue Lai Yue Ai)
- 2010 Taiwan Top 10 Most Earning Singers

=== 2011 ===
- 2011 Baidu Entertainment Boiling Point Awards: Best Group
- 2011 Baidu Entertainment Boiling Point Awards: Hong Kong and Taiwan Region Top Song: Cherish Your Heartache (心疼你的心疼 Xin Teng Ni De Xin Teng)

2012- waiting
