= Super Hot =

- Super Hot cover

Studio album 太熱 by Fahrenheit
- Released: 17 September 2010
- Genres: Mandopop, dance
- Length: 39:08
- Language: Mandarin
- Label: HIM International Music

Fahrenheit chronology
Fantasy World Tour (2010)	Super Hot (2010)

Super Hot (Chinese: 太熱; pinyin: Tai Re) is the fourth and final Mandarin studio album by the Taiwanese Mandopop boy band Fahrenheit (Chinese: 飛輪海). It was released on 17 September 2010 by HIM International Music. It is the last album to feature the member Wu Chun, who left the group in June 2011.

The tracks "太熱" (Super Hot) is listed at #15 and "心疼你的心疼" (Heartache on Your Heartache) at #71 on Hit Fm Taiwan's Hit Fm Annual Top 100 Singles Chart (Hit-Fm年度百首單曲) for 2010.

The "心疼你的心疼" (Heartache on Your Heartache) won one of the Top 20 Songs of the Year at the 1st Global Chinese Golden Chart Awards jointly presented by radio station Hit Fm Taiwan.

== Album ==
The title track "太熱" (Super Hot) is a high tempo dance number following in the style of their previous hits, "出神入化" (Superb) and "我有我的YOUNG" (I Have My Young). The other lead tracks, "心疼你的心疼" (Heartache on Your Heartache) is a mellow ballad, with the music video starring Wu Chun and Patty Hou, and "Sexy Girl" is another mid-tempo dance track. "新生" (Rebirth) is the Mandarin opening theme song for Japanese anime series BLEACH4 broadcast in Taiwan.

It also features tracks from Taiwanese dramas starring members of Fahrenheit:

- "很安靜" (Very Quiet) - ending theme of Momo Love, starring Jiro Wang, Calvin Chen and Cyndi Wang
- "守護星" (Guardian Star) and "誤會" (Mistake) - opening and ending theme songs respectively of Love Buffet, starring Aaron Yan, Calvin Chen and Reen Yu

== Track listing ==
1. "太熱" Tai Re (Super Hot) 00:02:57
2. "Sexy Girl" 00:03:03
3. "心疼你的心疼" Xin Teng Ni De Xin Teng (Cherish Your Heartache) 00:03:59
4. "繼續愛" Ji Xu Ai (Keep Loving You) 00:05:02
5. "很安靜" Hen An Jing (Very Quiet) 00:04:32
6. "守護星" Shou Hu Xing (Guardian Star) 00:03:40
7. "活得更像我" Huo De Geng Xiang Wo (Going On My Way) 00:04:21
8. "誤會" Wu Hui (Misunderstanding) 00:04:23
9. "泰山程式" Tai Shan Cheng Shi (Tai Shan Formula) 00:03:24
10. "新生" Xin Sheng (Rebirth) 00:03:47

== Music videos ==
- "太熱" (Super Hot) MV
- "心疼你的心疼" (Heartache on Your Heartache) MV - starring Wu Chun and Patty Hou. It is about a body guard (Wu Chun) who falls for the news anchor (Patty Hou), whom he is protecting from a stalker.
- "Sexy Girl" MV - with Calvin Chen as male lead
- "守護星" Shou Hu Xing (Guardian Star) MV - feature clips from fan meeting
- "誤會" Wu Hui (Mistake) MV - feature clips from Love Buffet
