= The X-Family (soundtrack) =

The X-Family Original Soundtrack
- The X-Family OST cover

Soundtrack album 終極一班 by Various artists
- Released: 31 August 2007
- Genre: Mandopop
- Length: 43:47
- Language: Mandarin
- Label: HIM International Music

The X-Family Original Soundtrack (Chinese: 終極一家 電視原聲帶; pinyin: zhōng jí yī jiā diànshì yuánshēngdài) is the soundtrack for the 2007 Taiwanese drama, The X-Family, starring Aaron Yan, Calvin Chen, and Jiro Wang of Taiwanese boy band, Fahrenheit and Danson Tang. It was released by HIM International Music on 31 August 2007. The album included the opening and ending theme songs by Fahrenheit as well as solo tracks by Aaron Yan, Calvin Chen Jiro Wang and Danson Tang.

== Track listing ==
1. "出神入化" Chu Shen Ru Hua (Superb) - Fahrenheit (opening theme)
2. "不會愛" Bu Hui Ai (Don't Know How to Love) - Fahrenheit (ep 31 to 50 ending theme)
3. "最愛還是你" Zui Ai Hai Shi Ni [Still Love You the Most] - Danson Tang (ep 1 to 30 ending theme)
4. "你是我所有的回憶" (You Are All My Memories) - Calvin Chen
5. "願意不愛你" (Willing Not to Love) - Aaron Yan
6. "在水一方" (Across the Water) - Jiro Wang
7. "鳥拉巴哈" (Wu La Ba Ha) - Pauline Lan, Jiro Wang, Xie He Xian, Huang Xiao Róu (Originally from Project Pop)
8. "雨在風中" - 你是我所有的回憶 演奏曲 (Rain and Wind - You Are All My Memories Instrumental)
9. "時空之戰" - 出神入化 演奏曲 (Time Battle - Superb Instrumental)
10. "安靜的等待" - 不會愛 演奏曲 (Silently Waiting - Don't Know How to Love Instrumental)
11. "我存在" - 不會愛 演奏曲 (Don't Know How to Love Instrumental)
12. "逆流的愛" - 在水一方 演奏曲 (Across the Water Instrumental)
13. "超能力之謎" - 出神入化 演奏曲 (Superb Instrumental)
14. "趕不上的未來" - 不會愛 演奏曲 (Don't Know How to Love Instrumental)
15. "寒冷的夏天" - 在水一方 演奏曲 (Across the Water Instrumental)
16. "穿越時空愛上你" - 不會愛 演奏曲 (Don't Know How to Love Instrumental)

VCD

1. The X-Family TV spots X 4 (60 secs each)
2. Fahrenheit Freedom Concert footage (approx. 35mins)
