= KO One (soundtrack) =

KO One Original Soundtrack
- KO One OST cover

Soundtrack album 終極一班 by Various artists
- Released: 27 December 2005
- Genre: Mandopop
- Length: 57:38
- Language: Mandarin
- Label: HIM International Music

KO One Original Soundtrack (Chinese: 終極一班 電視原聲帶; pinyin: zhōngjí yībān diànshì yuánshēngdài) is the soundtrack for the 2005/2006 Taiwanese drama, KO One, starring Aaron Yan, Calvin Chen, and Jiro Wang of Taiwanese boy band, Fahrenheit and Danson Tang. It was released by HIM International Music on 27 December 2005. The album included song by the then newly formed Taiwanese boy band Fahrenheit and also brought fame to Taiwanese artist, Tank who wrote and sang the opening and ending theme songs. The album was the best selling soundtrack in 2006, selling more than 60,000 copies in Taiwan within the first month.

== Track listing ==
1. "終極一班" (KO One a.k.a. "The Extreme Class) - Tank (opening theme)
2. "一個人流浪" (Wandering Alone) - Fahrenheit
3. "給我你的愛" (Give Me Your Love) - Tank (ending theme)
4. "孺子可教" (Teachable Child) - Fahrenheit
5. "保護色" (Protective Color) - Su Yi Cheng
6. "終極" (The Extreme) - J. Wu
7. "孤單心事" (A Worried Loneliness) - Lan You Shi
8. "從今以後" (From Now On) - Tank
9. "母親妳真偉大 演奏曲" (Mother, You Are Great - instrumental)
10. "保護色 温柔之章演奏曲" (Protective Color Gentle Romantic Version - instrumental)
11. "終極一班 風暴之章演奏曲" (KO One Revolutionary Version - instrumental)
12. "給我你的愛 心動之章演奏曲" (Give Me Your Love Romantic Version - instrumental)
13. "孺子可教 舞動之章演奏曲" (Teachable Child Dance Version - instrumental)
14. "給我你的愛 淘氣之章演奏曲" (Give Me Your Love Naughty Version - instrumental)
15. "保護色 擁抱之章演奏曲" (Protective Color Romantic Piano Version - instrumental)

VCD

1. "終極一班" (KO One a.k.a. "The Extreme Class) MV
2. "給我你的愛" (Give Me Your Love) MV
3. "給我你的愛" (Give Me Your Love) MV Behind-the-scene
4. Fahrenheit and HIM International Music press conference footage
