= Fahrenheit (Fahrenheit album) =

Fahrenheit First Self-Titled Album
- Fahrenheit First Self-Titled Album cover

Studio album 飛輪海 首張同名專輯 by Fahrenheit
- Released: 15 September 2006
- Genre: Mandopop
- Length: 48:31
- Language: Mandarin
- Label: HIM International Music

Fahrenheit chronology
Fahrenheit First Self-Titled Album (2006)	Two-Sided Fahrenheit (2008)

Alternative cover

Fahrenheit First Self-Titled Album (Chinese: 飛輪海 首張同名專輯; pinyin: Fēilúnhǎi shǒuzhāng tóngmíng zhuānjí) is Taiwanese Mandopop quartet boy band Fahrenheit's (Chinese: 飛輪海) debut Mandarin studio album. It was released on 15 September 2006 by HIM International Music.

Two more editions were released including Fahrenheit First Self-Titled Album (Cool Guy MV Edition) (飛輪海同名專輯 帥酷神迷影音超值版) on 6 October 2006 and Fahrenheit Self-Titled Album (Final Collectible Edition) (飛輪海首張同名專輯 王者魅力 終極私藏版) on 27 October 2006, both containing a bonus DVD with different content. It was also released in Japan on 21 November 2007 and contained a Japanese version of "我有我的Young" (I Have My Young).

== Album ==
The album's lead track and Fahrenheit's debut single "我有我的Young" (I Have My Young) is a high tempo dance track. The mellow ballad "夏雪" (Summer Snow) is composed by label mate Tank.

It also features tracks from Taiwanese dramas starring members of Fahrenheit:

- "只對你有感覺" (Only Have Feelings For You) - from Tokyo Juliet, starring Wu Chun and Ariel Lin
- "一個人流浪" (Wandering Alone) from KO One, starring Jiro Wang, Calvin Chen, Aaron Yan and Danson Tang
- "愛到" (To Love) and "我有我的Young" (I Have My Young) from Hanazakarino Kimitachihe, starring Wu Chun, Jiro Wang and Ella Chen

== Reception ==
The album debuted and peaked at number two on Taiwan's G-Music Weekly Mandarin and Combo Charts at week 37, and Five Music Chart at week 38 with a percentage sales of 25.98%, 14.43% and 13.56 respectively.

The track "只對你有感覺" (Only Have Feelings For You), which features Hebe Tien of S.H.E, is listed at number six on Hit Fm Taiwan's Hit Fm Annual Top 100 Singles Chart (Hit-Fm年度百首單曲) for 2006.

The track "我有我的Young" (I Have My Young) was nominated for Top 10 Gold Songs at the Hong Kong TVB8 Awards, presented by television station TVB8, in 2007.

== Track listing ==
1. "我有我的Young" Wo You Wo De Young (I Have My Young)
2. "夏雪" Xia Xue (Summer Snow) - 4:30
3. "只對你有感覺" Zhi Dui Ni You Gan Jue (Only Have Feelings For You) - feat Hebe Tien of S.H.E - 4:15
4. "一個人流浪" Yi Ge Ren Liu Lang (Wandering Alone)
5. "找幸福給你" Zhao Xing Fu Gei Ni (Finding Happiness For You)
6. "愛到" Ai Dao (To Love)
7. "出口" Chu Kou (Exit)
8. "2月30號見" 2 Yue 30 Hao Jian (Meet on February 30)
9. "請在我後悔之前離開我" Qing Zai Wo Hou Hui Zhi Qian Li Kai Wo (Please Leave Me Before I Regret)
10. "不死之謎" Bu Si Zhi Mi (The Secret of Immortality)
11. "只對你有感覺" Zhi Dui Ni You Gan Jue (Only Have Feelings For You - Remix) - feat Hebe Tien of S.H.E (健康活力Remix)

== Music videos ==
- "我有我的Young" (I Have My Young) MV
- "夏雪" (Summer Snow) MV
- "只對你有感覺" (Only Have Feelings For You) MV - feat Hebe Tien of S.H.E
- "一個人流浪" (Wandering Alone) MV
- "找幸福給你" (Finding Happiness For You) MV
- "愛到" (To Love) MV
- "出口" (Exit) MV
- "2月30號見" (Meet on February 30) MV

== Charts ==
Release	Chart	Peak Position	Chart Run
15 September 2006	G-Music Top 20	#2	17 weeks

Singles on Hito Chinese Charts
Song	Peak Position	Chart Run
"我有我的YOUNG" (I Have My Young)	#3	1 week
"只對你有感覺" (Only Have Feelings For You)	#3	1 week
"夏雪" (Summer Snow)	#6	1 week
"愛到" (To Love)	#3	2 weeks
"一個人流浪" (Wandering Alone)	#5	1 week
"找幸福给你" (Finding Happiness For You)	#4	3 weeks
