= Hanazakari no Kimitachi e (disambiguation) =

Hanazakari no Kimitachi e (花ざかりの君たちへ; lit. 'For You in Full Blossom'), abbreviated as Hana-Kimi, is a Japanese manga series written and illustrated by Hisaya Nakajo.

Hanazakari no Kimitachi e or Hana-Kimi may also refer to:

- Hana-Kimi (TV series), a 2007 Japanese television drama based on the manga
- Hanazakari no Kimitachi e: Ikemen Paradise 2011, a 2011 Japanese television series based on the 2007 drama
- Hanazakarino Kimitachihe, a 2006 Taiwanese television drama based on the manga
- Hanazakarino Kimitachihe (soundtrack), the soundtrack for the Taiwanese drama
