= Hanazakarino Kimitachihe (soundtrack) =

Soundtrack for the Taiwanese drama of the same name

Hanazakarino Kimitachihe Original Soundtrack
- Hanazakarino Kimitachihe Original Soundtrack cover

Soundtrack album 花樣少年少女 電視原聲帶 by Various artists
- Released: 1 December 2006
- Genre: Mandopop
- Length: 56:55
- Language: Mandarin
- Label: HIM International Music

Hanazakarino Kimitachihe Original Soundtrack (Chinese: 花樣少年少女 電視原聲帶; pinyin: Huāyàng Shàonián Shàonǚ Diànshì Yuánshēngdài) is the soundtrack album for the 2006 Taiwanese drama, Hanazakarino Kimitachihe, based on the Japanese manga, Hana-Kimi, starring Wu Chun and Jiro Wang of Fahrenheit; and Ella of S.H.E. It was released by HIM International Music on 1 December 2006.

== Reception ==
Although the soundtrack did not chart until four weeks after its release, it debuted at #3 on the G-Music Charts, charted for over 10 weeks,

The album won Best Original Soundtrack at the 2007 KKBOX Music Awards and at the 2008 HITO Radio Music Awards presented by Taiwanese radio station Hit FM.

The tracks "超喜歡你" (I Really, Really Like You) and "怎麽辦" (What Should I Do?) were nominated for Top 10 Gold Songs at the Hong Kong TVB8 Awards, presented by television station TVB8, in 2007. Another track "專屬天使" (Special Angel) won one of the Top 10 Songs of the Year, also at the 2008 HITO Radio Music Awards.

== Track listing ==
CD

1. "怎麽辦" (What Should I Do?) - S.H.E (opening theme)
2. "專屬天使" (Special Angel) - Tank (ending theme)
3. "超喜歡你" (I Really, Really Like You) - Fahrenheit
4. "懂了" (Understood) - Tank
5. "我一直都在" (I'm Always There) - Lin Ji'an, Cheng Yulun
6. "傻傻的勇氣" (Foolish Courage) - Venk
7. "謝謝愛" (Thank You, Love) - Sister Garden
8. "天使的擁抱 演奏曲" (Angel's Embrace - Instrumental)
9. "偷偷愛 演奏曲" (Forbidden Love - Instrumental)
10. "天使之泉 演奏曲" (Angelic Fountain - Instrumental)
11. "完蛋了 演奏曲" (Done For - Instrumental)
12. "幻想 演奏曲" (Fantasy - Instrumental)
13. "Thanks to Love 演奏曲" (Thanks to Love - Instrumental)
14. "愛到瘋狂 演奏曲" (Mad Love - Instrumental)
15. "期待 演奏曲" (Expectation - Instrumental)
16. "比超人還超喜歡你 演奏曲" (Compared to Superman, I Still Love You - Instrumental)

DVD

1. "怎麽辦" (What Should I Do?) - S.H.E MV
2. "超喜歡你" (I Really, Really Like You) - Fahrenheit MV
3. The making of Hanazakarino Kimitachihe and "怎麽辦" (What Should I Do?) MV Behind the Scenes

== Charts ==
| Chart Name | Debut Position | Week# / Week Dates of Peak Position | Peak Position | Percentage of Album Sales at Peak |
|---|---|---|---|---|
| Five Music Taiwan; 5大金榜 | #2 | #49 / 1–7 December 2006 | #2 | 13.92% |
| G-Music Combo Chart, Taiwan 風雲榜 (綜合榜) | #5 | #48 / 1–7 December 2006 | #5 | 3.43% |
| G-Music Mandarin Chart, Taiwan 風雲榜 (華語榜) | #3 | #48 / 1–7 December 2006 | #3 | 6.95% |
