= Love You More and More =

- Love You More and More (Trendy Gentry Edition) cover

Studio album 越來越愛 by Fahrenheit
- Released: 2 January 2009
- Genre: Mandopop
- Length: 41:34
- Language: Mandarin
- Label: HIM International Music

Fahrenheit chronology
Two-sided Fahrenheit 雙面飛輪海 (2008)	Love You More and More (2009)	Fantasy World Tour 想入飛飛演唱會 (2010)

Alternative cover

Love You More and More (Chinese: 越來越愛; pinyin: Yue Lai Yue Ai) is the third studio album by the Taiwanese Mandopop boy band Fahrenheit. (Chinese: 飛輪海) Two versions of the album were released on 2 January 2009 by HIM International Music: Love You More and More (Trendy Gentry Edition) (越來越愛 貴族時尚男爵版) and Love You More and More (Cool Rocker Edition) (越來越愛 酷帥搖滾飛仔版). A Love You More and More (Celebration MV Edition) (越來越愛 冠軍慶功影音雙碟版) was released on 23 January 2009 with a bonus DVD containing seven music videos. (Note: as listed in the Music Video section)

The album was awarded one of the Top 10 Selling Mandarin Albums of the Year at the 2009 IFPI Hong Kong Album Sales Awards, presented by the Hong Kong branch of IFPI.

The tracks "越來越愛" (Love You More and More) is listed at #36 on Hit Fm Taiwan's Hit Fm Annual Top 100 Singles Chart (Hit-Fm年度百首單曲) for 2009.

== Album ==
The album consists of a rock style of music and a departure from dance tracks of the past two albums, with only "動脈" (Artery) as a mid tempo dance number. The title track "越來越愛" (Love You More and More) is a mid tempo rock track. The other lead tracks "留下來" (Stay With Me) and "寂寞暴走" (Lonesome Sprint) are both rock ballads. The bonus track "Touch Your Heart" is the Taiwan tourism theme song, which is available on overseas edition, e.g. Hong Kong and Japan.

It also features tracks from Taiwanese dramas starring members of Fahrenheit:

- "恆星" (Shining Star) - opening theme of Rolling Love, starring Jiro Wang, Danson Tang, and Genie Chuo
- "動脈" (Artery) - opening theme of Mysterious Incredible Terminator, starring Aaron Yan, Gui Gui and Alien Huang
- "越來越愛" (Love You More and More) and "默默" (Silently) - opening and ending theme songs respectively of ToGetHer, starring Jiro Wang, Rainie Yang, and George Hu

== Track listing ==
1. "動脈" Dong Mai (Artery)
2. "越來越愛" Yue Lai Yue Ai (Love You More and More)
3. "寂寞暴走" Ji Mo Bao Zou (Lonesome Sprint)
4. "恆星" Heng Xing (Shining Star)
5. "默默" Mo Mo (Silently)
6. "最佳聽衆" Zui Jia Ting Zhong (The Best Listener)
7. "留下來" Liu Xia Lai (Stay With Me)
8. "孤單摩天輪" Gu Dan Mo Tian Lun (Lonely Ferris Wheel)
9. "雨是眼淚" Yu Shi Yan Lei (Rain and Tear)
10. "你應該被珍惜" Ni Ying Gai Bei Zhen Xi (Cherish)
11. "Touch Your Heart" - Bonus track

== Music videos ==
1. "越來越愛" Yue Lai Yue Ai (Love You More and More) MV
2. "寂寞暴走" Ji Mo Bao Zou (Lonesome Sprint) MV - with Aaron Yan as lead actor
3. "恆星" Heng Xing (Shining Star) MV
4. "默默" Mo Mo (Silently) MV - feat Rainie Yang from clips of ToGetHer
5. "最佳聽衆" Zui Jia Ting Zhong (The Best Listener) MV
6. "留下來" Liu Xia Lai (Stay With Me) MV - with Jiro Wang as lead actor
7. "孤單摩天輪" Gu Dan Mo Tian Lun (Lonely Ferris Wheel) MV
