= Sunny Girl =

2011 Taiwanese television series

- Promo poster
- Also known as: 陽光天使; Yang Guang Tian Shi; Sunshine Angel
- 陽光天使
- Genre: Romance, Comedy
- Directed by: Wang Ming Tai / Gong Chao
- Starring: Wu Chun; Rainie Yang
- Opening theme: Sunny by Boney M
- Ending theme: Bu Neng Gao Su Wo (不能告訴我) by Nylon Chen
- Country of origin: Republic of China (Taiwan)
- Original language: Mandarin
- No. of episodes: 14

Production
- Producer: Huang Wan Bo / Ma Ying 馬瀛
- Production locations: Taiwan, China, Japan
- Production company: Comic International Productions

Original release
- Network: TTV Main Channel
- Release: 4 August – 22 December 2011

Related
- Successful Story of a Bright Girl

Sunny Girl (traditional Chinese: 陽光天使; simplified Chinese: 阳光天使; pinyin: Yang Guang Tian Shi; lit. 'Sunshine Angel') is a 2011 Taiwanese drama starring Wu Chun and Rainie Yang. It is produced by Comic International Productions (可米國際影視事業股份有限公司). The drama started filming in May 2010 and wrapped on 21 September 2010. It was filmed on location in Taiwan, China and Japan. It was broadcast in the summer of 2011. Sunny Girl is the Taiwanese remake of the 2002 Korean drama Successful Story of a Bright Girl.

== Plot ==
Yangguang's parents were in huge debt because of cheating. In order to pay off the debt, Yangguang agreed to work as a maid to help them pay off the debt. Yangguang went to Di Yaxin's house as a maid. Because of the previous feud, Yangguang suffered a lot in the Di family, but she still endured it silently. Yangguang's positive and optimistic personality, coupled with her help to Yaxin to complete the new cosmetics product launch that almost failed, gradually attracted Yaxin to her. Yin Anqi, a childhood sweetheart who admired Yaxin, was jealous and asked her mother to let her and Yaxin get engaged as soon as possible. Geng Fei, who had always loved Anqi silently, pretended to clear her name, but actually planned to plunder the sovereignty of the company, leaving Yaxin with nothing in an instant. Yangguang always encouraged Yaxin. Geng's father and son were eventually arrested by the police, and Anqi regretted everything she had done. Yangguang helped Yaxin take back the company, but rejected Yaxin's proposal and became a kindergarten teacher. Two years later, Yaxin went to find Yangguang as promised, and the two finally got married.

== Details ==
- Title: 陽光天使 (阳光天使) / Yang Guang Tian Shi
- English title: Sunny Girl / Sunshine Angel
- Episodes:14
- Broadcast network: Hunan TV / TTV / GTV
- Broadcast period: 2011-Jul-06 / 2011-Aug-04 / 2011-Aug-14
- Air time: Thursday 22:10
- Opening theme song: Sunny by Boney M
- Ending theme song: Bu Neng Gao Su Wo (不能告訴我) by Nylon Chen

== Cast ==
- Wu Chun as Di Yaxin (狄雅辛)
- Rainie Yang as Chen Yangguang (陳陽光)
- Liu Zi Yan as Angela 殷安琪
- Johnny Zhang as Geng Fei 耿非
- Lee Shiau Shiang as Ai Yingshan 艾英善
- Ku Pao-ming as Yang Yilang 陽一郎
- Zhao Shu Hai as Geng Guwen 耿顧問
- Wu Qian Qian as Elizabeth 殷董事長
- Ryoko Nakano (中野良子) as Yangguang's grandmother
- Muto Nobutomi (武藤信美) as Xiao Lin He Zi 小林和子
- Zhang Guang Lei (張光磊) as Qi Lei 齊磊
- Bai Yun (白雲) as Liao Jianyu 廖建宇
- Ya Zi (丫子) as Liao's sister

=== Guest stars ===
- Jiro Wang as Jiro
- Calvin Chen as Calvin
- Aaron Yan as Aaron "Wen Shuxiu" (温舒秀)
