= Antitalent =

Taiwanese musical group

antitalent 沒有才能
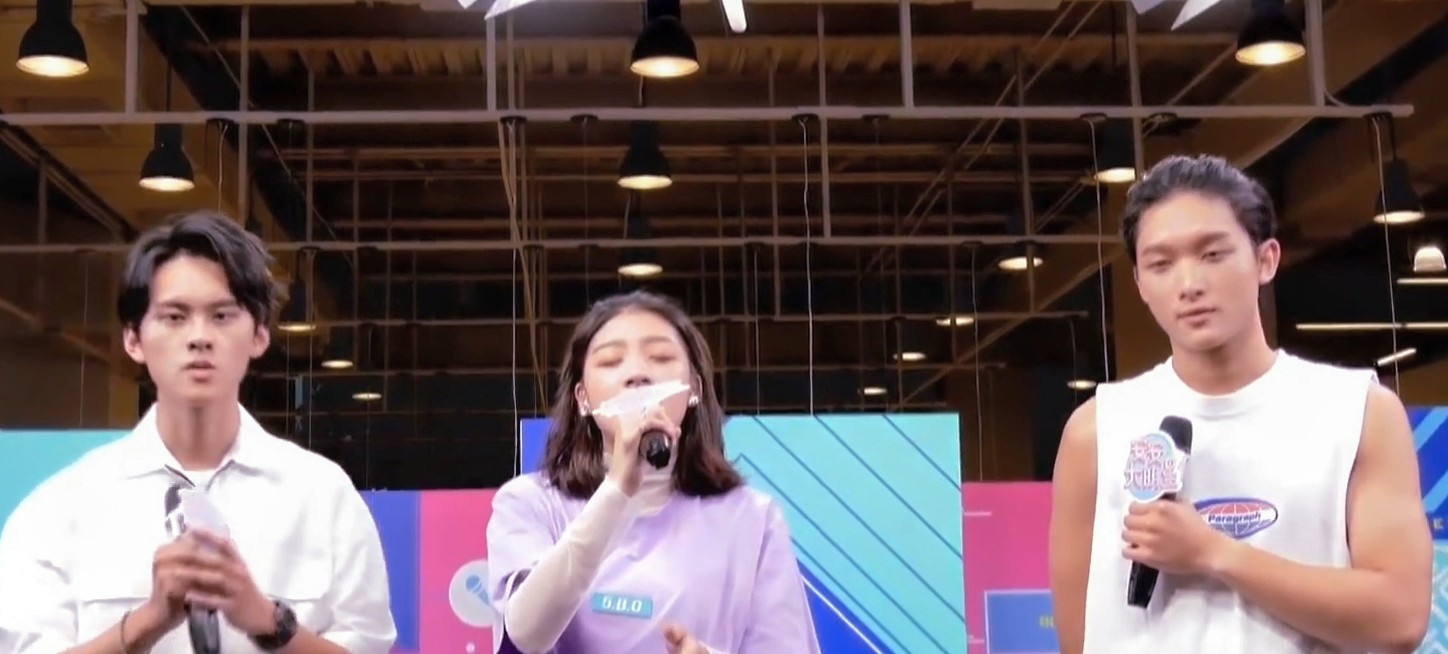

Background information
- Origin: Hualien City, Taiwan
- Genres: Pop music, Hip hop music, Indie pop, Soft rock, Synth-pop, City pop, Funk
- Occupation: Band
- Years active: 2019–present
- Label: HIM International Music
- Members: Pei Tuo; Shuo Mei; Huang Ruo-hsin

Antitalent (Chinese: 沒有才能; pinyin: Méiyǒu Cáinéng) is a Taiwanese musical group formed by three high school classmates from Hualien City, Taiwan. The trio consists of Pei Tuo and Shuo Mei as rappers, and Huang Ruo-hsin as the vocalist.

Antitalent wrote and performed the high school graduation song, "The Giraffe" (還是要有長頸鹿才能). The group released their debut album "Beast to Human (我終於也變成人了) in 2024.

== Members ==
- Pei Tuo (裴拓) – rapper
- Shuo Mei (碩美) – rapper
- Huang Ruo-hsin (黃若欣) – vocals

== Discography ==
=== Studio albums ===
- Wooyaa Wooyaa (烏鴉烏鴉) (2020)
- Beast to Human (我終於也變成人了) (2024)
