= Jeno Liu =

Chinese singer, DJ, producer and actress (born 1982)

Jeno Liu 刘力扬
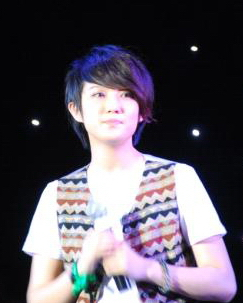
- Liu Liyang performing at the Star Live in Beijing for MySpace Earthquake Relief Concert on June 5, 2008

Background information
- Also known as: Jeno Liu
- Born: Liu Liyang; October 24, 1982 (age 43)
- Origin: Beijing, China
- Genres: Mandopop
- Instrument: Electronic Piano
- Years active: 2006–present
- Labels: Modernsky; EE-Media; HIM International Music; WOW Music

Jeno Liu Liyang (simplified Chinese: 刘力扬; traditional Chinese: 劉力揚; pinyin: Liú Lìyáng, born October 24, 1982) is a Chinese singer, DJ, producer, and actress. Jeno first gained popularity in the third season (2006) of the Chinese singing contest Super Girl (Chinese: 超级女声; Super Voice Girl), in which she was awarded champion for the Guangzhou district and second runner-up in the finals. She refers to her fans as 'Li Zi' (Chinese: 栗子; English: Chestnut), derived from her middle name 'Li' (力).

== Biography ==
Jeno Liu was born on October 24, 1982, in Beijing, China.

Jeno graduated from Luton University in England with a degree in Advertising and Marketing. She is bilingual in Mandarin and English. Jeno first came to prominence after an appearance in the third season (2006) of the Chinese singing contest Super Girl (Chinese: 超级女声; Super Voice Girl). She became champion for the Guangzhou district and second runner-up in the finals. She calls her fans 'Li Zi' (Chinese: 栗子; English: Chestnut), derived from her middle name 'Li' (力).

In her first advertisement, she broke her leg when performing a stunt and was hospitalised for a few months, putting her career on hold. This injury adversely affected her singing career as she could not participate in most of the Super Girl touring concerts. After recovering, she returned to the recording studio. On January 4, 2008, she joined HIM International Music.

In 2012, she traveled abroad to study DJing and music production, developing a more international style incorporating elements of EDM. After returning, she established a studio under her name and became the first female DJ star in China.

In 2013, she worked with producers such as Dirtcaps, Freehand, Frankmusik, and Dexter King, releasing singles such as "Set You Free" and "I Can't Live Without You."

In 2017, she signed with Modernsky, releasing her fifth album, Coulomb Law, in which she served as vocalist, songwriter, and producer. Meanwhile, she was invited by KFC to sing their anthem.

On April 20, 2019, Jeno Liu performed in Malaysia at the Arena of Stars in Genting Resorts as part of an ensemble Mandopop concert featuring other Mandarin pop singers. Among the Mandarin pieces she performed, she also included an English song. Many of her performances featured EDM elements.

== Discography ==
=== Albums and EPs ===
Type	Information	Track listing
1st EP	提线木偶 (Stringed Puppets): Release Date: August 13, 2007; Label: EE-Media	Track listing: 1. 提线木偶 (Stringed Puppets); 2. 耶路撒冷 (Jerusalem); 3. 英雄的呼唤 (The Call of Heros)
1st Studio	我就是這樣 (I Am Who I Am): Release Date: June 2, 2008; Label: HIM International Music	Track listing: 1. 我就是這樣 (I Am Who I Am) - Feat. Tank; 2. 眼淚笑了 (Tears Smile); 3. 靠不靠譜 (Reliable or Not); 4. 傳說 (Legend) - Duet with Yoga Lin; 5. 一句一傷 (One Sentence, One Wound); 6. 拍寫 (Sorry); 7. 單 (Single); 8. 死胡同 (Blind Alley); 9. 我愛你有什麼不對 (What's Wrong With Loving You); 10. 雨念 (Reminiscing Rain); 11. 提线木偶 (Stringed Puppets); 12. 耶路撒冷 (Jerusalem); 13. 英雄的呼唤 (The Call of Heros)
2nd EP	转寄 (Forward): Release Date: November 6, 2009; Label: HIM International Music	Track listing: 1. 礼物 (Present); 2. 崇拜你 (Adore You); 3. 一个人就好 (Fine By Myself); 4. 梅花香 (Scent of Plum Blossom); 5. 寂寞光年 (Lonely Years)
2nd Studio (New tracks + Cover Compilations)	旅途-心歌自選輯 (Young): Release Date: December 16, 2011; Label: HIM International Music	Track listing: 1. 旅途 (NEW); 2. 他夏了夏天 (Original: 蘇打綠 Sodagreen); 3. 手放開 (Original: 李聖傑 Sam Lee); 4. 談感情 (NEW); 5. 證據 (Original: 楊乃文 Faith Yang); 6. Let Me Take You There (Original: Plain White T's); 7. My Delirium (Original: Ladyhawke); 8. 全世界失眠 (Original: 陈奕迅 Eason Chan); 9. 天后 (Original: 陈势安 Andrew Tan); 10. 海闊天空 (Original: 信樂團 Shin)
3rd Studio	库仑定律 (Coulomb's Law): Release Date: November 5, 2017; Label: Modernsky	Track listing: 1. Intro; 2. Runaway(Trap Remix); 3. Set You Free; 4. Warriors; 5. 岛 6. Whip or Clap (Interlude); 7. 世界看我; 8. 不朽; 9. 十年之后
4th Studio	Neon Lit 虹: Release Date: May 21, 2019; Label: Modernsky	Track listing: 1. Work for light 2. 暂时不要多话 (Don't talk too much for now); 3. 一夜荡漾 (Waving all night long); 4. 我的时区 (My hour zone); 5. 动物世界 (Animal world); 6. 这一刻的想法 (Thinking moments); 7. 十年之后 (Ten years later); 8. 扑朔迷离 (Confused)

=== Singles ===
Release date	Song name	Album/Remarks
August 2006	Rain 布萊梅	收录于超女十强纪念合辑
September 2007	小小大人物	与泳儿、钟舒曼合唱，香港迪士尼乐园主题曲
April 2008	TIAMO	與炎亞綸合唱，收錄于飛輪海“雙面飛輪海”專輯
June 2008	与你同在	汶川地震赈灾歌曲
July 2008	比較美好的世界	四川大地震震災勵志歌曲，與華研全體藝員合唱
April 2013	世界看我	上海時裝周主題曲
November 2016	枪上膛的人	电视剧《双雄》片尾曲
March 2017	給我個理由	电影《越囧》主题曲

== Filmography ==
=== Films ===
Year	Title	Role
2016	越囧 (Lost in Vietnam)	白小白
2015	情战 (Love War))	N/A
