= ToGetHer =

- Promotional poster
- Also known as: 愛就宅一起; Ai Jiu Zhai Yi Qi; Superstar Express
- Genre: Romance, Comedy
- Written by: Lin Xinhui (林欣慧), Jane Qi (簡奇峯)
- Directed by: Linzi Ping (林子平)
- Starring: Rainie Yang; Jiro Wang; George Hu
- Opening theme: "越來越愛" [Loves You More And More] by Fahrenheit
- Ending theme: "默默" [Silently] by Fahrenheit
- Country of origin: Republic of China (Taiwan)
- Original language: Mandarin
- No. of episodes: 12 (CTV edited version); 13 (GTV uncut version)

Production
- Executive producers: Wu Yuqing (吳毓慶), Fang Ke Ren (方可人), Chen Zhihan (陳芷涵), Feng Jiarui (馮家瑞)
- Producers: Wang Xingui (王信貴), Huang Wanbo (黃萬伯)
- Production locations: Taipei, Taiwan
- Running time: 90 mins (Sundays at 22:00 to 23:30)
- Production company: Comic International Productions

Original release
- Network: China Television (CTV)
- Release: 15 February – 3 May 2009

Related
- Love or Bread (我的億萬麵包); Boys Over Flowers (花樣男子)

ToGetHer (Chinese: 愛就宅一起; pinyin: Ai Jiu Zhai Yi Qi, aka Superstar Express) is a 2009 Taiwanese drama starring Jiro Wang of Fahrenheit, Rainie Yang and George Hu. It was produced by Comic International Productions (可米國際影視事業股份有限公司) and directed by Linzi Ping (林子平). It started filming on 4 June 2008 and wrapped in mid-September 2008.

It was first broadcast in Taiwan on free-to-air China Television (CTV) (中視) from 15 February to 3 May 2009, every Sunday at 22:00 to 23:30 and cable TV Gala Television (GTV) Variety Show/CH 28 (八大綜合台) on 21 February to 9 May 2009, every Saturday at 21:00 to 22:30. The last two episodes on GTV were aired together as one episode. A few scenes were filmed in the 100% Entertainment recording studio and the building of Gala Television.

== Synopsis ==
Momo Chen is a quiet and shy girl with Jia Sen as her only friend. She is often forgotten and left behind. Her only interest is to read her manga, "Prince Kashaba." Mars is a superstar whose popularity went downhill after a series of negative publicity incidents. His finances, as a result, go into red alert and he is forced to move out of the company house provided to him and moves into a cheaper place instead. He is also told to attend school while on downtime. On the first day of school for Mars, he arrogantly signs his name onto one of Momo's manga with a permanent marker over a picture of Prince Kashaba. Momo becomes furious and yells at him in front of everyone. Meanwhile, Mars' manager, Yi Zhi, finds him a room for rent in Momo's house. Momo is unaware that the room is being rented until her sister drops the news on her suddenly after school. Both are unaware that it is Mars who is to be their tenant.

Mars gradually befriends Momo and her childhood friend Jia Sen, a swimming captain with the cognitive ability and maturity of an 8-year-old. Momo Chen describes him as "different from us" and "not silly or stupid". Jia Sen earns many medals for swimming and gives them to Momo because he secretly has feelings for her. He refers to Mars as "bad guy" and often gets upset when Momo hangs out with Mars. In the beginning Mars and Momo constantly fight but after going through some challenges together, they finally begin to show their feelings for one another.

== Cast ==
| Actor | Character | Relationships |
|---|---|---|
| Jiro Wang (汪東城) | Mars (莊俊男) | |
| Rainie Yang (楊丞琳) | Chen Mo Mo (陳默默) | |
| George Hu (胡宇崴) | Wei Jia Sen (魏加森) | Mo Mo's best friend and Mars' rival |
| Linda Liao (廖語晴) | Chen Chu Chu (陳楚楚) | Mo Mo's sister |
| King Chin (金勤) | Ke Yi Zhi (柯一隻) | Mars' manager and friend |
| Bao Wei Ming (包偉銘) | Tony Ge (Tony 哥) | Mars' manager |
| Teddy Wang Jianlong (王建隆) | Ben | Mars' nemesis |
| Ke Shuqin (柯淑勤) | Mars' mother (Mars母) | Mars' mother |
| Ann Hsu (許瑋甯) | Ivy (言詩嘉) | Mars' ex-girlfriend |
| Mandy Wei (魏蔓) | Luo Shasha (羅莎莎) | Mars' classmate and Mo Mo's bully |
| Lin Caiwei (林采薇) | Mao Mao (毛毛) | Mars' classmate and Mo Mo's bully |
| Ba Yu (巴鈺) | Xiao Bi (小白) | Mars' classmate and Mo Mo's bully |
| Yang Ching-Hsuan (楊晴瑄) | Money | Mars' classmate and Mo Mo's bully |
| Heaven Hai | Project team member | Cameo |

== Soundtrack ==
ToGetHer

Soundtrack album by Various artists
- Released: 2009
- Genre: Mandopop
- Language: Mandarin

ToGetHer Original Soundtrack (爱就宅一起 電視原聲帶) was released by Various artists, containing nine songs, in which four songs are various instrumental versions of the five original songs.

=== Track listing ===
| No. | Title | Singer(s) | Length |
|---|---|---|---|
| 1. | "Can't Help Myself" (管不住自己 (Guan Bu Zhu Zi Ji)) | Ring Hsu (徐宛鈴) |
| 2. | "World Wide Blackout" (全世界都停電 (Quan Shi Jie Dou Ting Dian)) | Tank |
| 3. | "Good to Be By Myself" (一個人就好 (Yi Ge Ren Jiu Hao)) | Jeno Liu |
| 4. | "Far Away By Your Side" (遠在身邊) | Judy Chou 周定緯 |
| 5. | "Silently inst." (消失的存在) |
| 6. | "Good To Have you - Silently inst." (有你真好) |
| 7. | "It's Love - Silently inst." (原來是愛) |
| 8. | "Loves You More And More inst." (噩運) |
| 9. | "Happy Lamb - Loves You More And More inst." (快樂羔羊) |

In addition, there are two songs not included in the original soundtrack: The opening theme song, which is "越來越愛" or "Loves You More And More" and the ending theme song "默默" or "Silently", both by Fahrenheit from their 3rd album Love You More and More.

== Books ==
- ToGetHer Love Box - Novel + Making Book (愛就宅一起戀愛寶盒-純愛小說+戀愛大作戰) - ISBN 978-957-803-727-4
- ToGetHer Photobook (愛就宅一起甜蜜寫真) - ISBN 978-957-803-723-6

== Reception ==
China Television (CTV) (中視) Ratings
| Episode | Original Broadcast Date | Average | Rank |
|---|---|---|---|
| 1 | 15 February 2009 | 1.46 | 2 |
| 2 | 22 February 2009 | 1.19 | 2 |
| 3 | 1 March 2009 | 1.12 | 2 |
| 4 | 8 March 2009 | 1.06 | 2 |
| 5 | 15 March 2009 | 1.04 | 2 |
| 6 | 22 March 2009 | 0.98 | 2 |
| 7 | 29 March 2009 | 0.84 | 2 |
| 8 | 5 April 2009 | 0.76 | 2 |
| 9 | 12 April 2009 | 0.69 | 2 |
| 10 | 19 April 2009 | 0.82 | 2 |
| 11 | 27 April 2009 | 0.71 | 2 |
| 12 | 3 May 2009 | 0.80 | 2 |
| Average | | 0.95 | 2 |

Rival dramas on air at the same time：

- Taiwan Television (TTV) (台視): My Queen
- Chinese Television System (CTS) (華視): Prince+Princess2 (王子看見二公主) / Knock Knock Loving You

== International broadcasts ==
| Channel | Location | Dates | Times |
|---|---|---|---|
| Channel U | Singapore | 21 February - 9 May 2009 | Saturdays at 21:30 |
| 8TV | Malaysia | from 7 March 2009 | Saturdays at 18:30 |
| Ching TV | Korea | 23 July - 19 August 2009 | Mondays to Fridays at 18:00 |
| China Entertainment Television (CETV) | China | from 20 August 2009 | Mondays to Fridays at 19:00 |
| Television Saitama (TVS) | Saitama Prefecture, Japan | from 15 January 2010 | Fridays at 11:30 |
| i-CABLE Entertainment | Hong Kong | from 1 February 2010 | Mondays to Fridays at 22:00 |
| TVB J2 | Hong Kong | from 3 February 2010 | Wednesdays & Thursdays at 22:30 |
| Hunan Broadcasting System (HBS) | China | from 14 July 2010 | every night at 22:00 |

== Controversy ==
On 15 February 2009, the premiere of the first episode of ToGether on China Television (CTV) (中視) was cut by approximately 17 minutes. This led to criticisms on the CTV forum, for not respecting the production team's vision and their creative spirit. CTV defended by stating that they wanted the story to be more compact. On 17 February 2009, Rainie Yang expressed on her blog, of hers and the production team's sadness over the edited first "incomplete" episode and reiterated that the premiere on Gala Television (GTV) Variety Show/CH 28 will be the complete version.

On 20 February 2009, the unaired episode 2 of TogetHer, due for network broadcast on 22 February, was posted on YouTube. Lai Cong Bi (賴聰筆), Deputy General Manager of Gala Television (GTV) expressed that in order to maximise the promotional tour of Jiro Wang, Rainie Yang and George Hu to Singapore, DVD of episodes 1 and 2 were released the previous week in Singapore.

== Production credit ==
- Screenwriter - Lin Xinhui (林欣慧), Jane Qi (簡奇峯)
- Screenplay coordinator – Qi Xilin (齊錫麟)
- Marketing coordinator – Choi Ji Qiao (蔡紀喬)
- Producer – Wang Xingui (王信貴), Huang Wanbo (黃萬伯)
- Director – Linzi Ping (林子平)
- Post-production director – Zhang Ying-lun (張映綸)
- Executive Producer – Wu Yuqing (吳毓慶) (CTV program manager), Fang Ke Ren (方可人) (GTV Planning Manager), Chen Zhihan (陳芷涵) (GTV Planning Manager), Feng Jiarui (馮家瑞) (Comic International Productions Executive)
