= Love Buffet =

- Promotional poster
- Also known as: 愛似百匯; 爱似百汇; Ai Si Bai Hui
- Genre: Romance, comedy
- Based on: Parfait Tic! by Nagamu Nanaji
- Directed by: Wu Jian Xin (吴建新)
- Starring: Reen Yu; Calvin Chen; Aaron Yan
- Opening theme: "守護星" (Guardian Star) by Fahrenheit
- Ending theme: "誤會" (Mistake) by Fahrenheit
- Country of origin: Taiwan
- Original language: Mandarin
- No. of episodes: 13

Production
- Producer: Wang Xin Gui (王信贵)
- Production location: Changhua
- Running time: 75 minutes
- Production company: Comi Media

Original release
- Network: FTV
- Release: 19 December 2010 – 13 March 2011

Related
- Personal Taste (個人取向); Love Together (愛讓我們在一起)

Love Buffet (traditional Chinese: 愛似百匯; simplified Chinese: 爱似百汇; pinyin: Ai Si Bai Hui ) is a 2010 Taiwanese television series based on the shōjo manga Parfait Tic! (パフェちっく!, Pafe Chikku!), written by Nagamu Nanaji. It stars Reen Yu, Aaron Yan and Calvin Chen. The two male leads were members of boy band Fahrenheit, which performed the opening and ending themes. The drama was co-produced by Gala Television (GTV) and Comi Media (可米製作股份有限公司) and directed by Wu Jian Xin (吴建新).

It was first broadcast in Taiwan on free-to-air Formosa Television (FTV, CH6 民視) on Sunday evenings from 19 December 2010, to 13 March 2011, and was repeated the following Saturday on cable TV Gala Television (GTV) Variety Show/CH 28 (八大綜合台). This show was also broadcast in Singapore and Malaysia.

== Plot ==
Xiao Feng is a lively girl starting her first year of university when her life is turned upside down by the arrival of her new upstairs neighbors: cousins Yi Cheng and Da Ye. Their arrival becomes much talked about at the university.

Xiao Feng starts to get along with Da Ye and falls in love with him. However, Da Ye doesn't have any feelings for Xiao Feng as he treats every girl the same way, although Xiao Feng sometimes feels that she is given preferential treatment. During this period, Yi Cheng starts to develop romantic feelings for Xiao Feng.

Xiao Feng confesses her feelings to Da Ye, who rejects her by saying that he doesn't know the true meaning of "love." Xiao Feng becomes heartbroken and depressed.

Yi Cheng pursues Xiao Feng, and they grow closer, which makes Da Ye uneasy. Just when Yi Cheng and Xiao Feng are about to become a couple, one of Yi Cheng's previous romantic interests demands his attention. They talk things through and move on from each other. However, Xiao Feng misinterprets the situation and becomes heartbroken again. Da Ye begins to develop feelings for Xiao Feng, and she starts dating him to help forget about Yi Cheng.

Yi Cheng continues to pursue Xiao Feng despite her being in a relationship with Da Ye. In class, Yi Cheng and Xiao Feng accidentally kiss; however, Xiao Feng tells Yi Cheng that she hated the kiss. Yi Cheng later confesses his feelings to Xiao Feng, while Da Ye becomes increasingly jealous.

Without telling Yi Cheng, Da Ye and Xiao Feng go on a two-day trip. Upon returning, Yi Cheng embraces Xiao Feng and tries to kiss her, but she pushes him away. Xiao Feng tells Da Ye about this, and Da Ye reacts by punching Yi Cheng.

The cousins learn that one of them must return to Shanghai to assist a new family business. Yi Cheng wants to ruin Da Ye and Xiao Feng's next date but hesitates as he does not want to hurt Xiao Feng. Da Ye breaks up with Xiao Feng, hating his jealousy as he falls further in love with her, and decides to go to Shanghai.

Yi Cheng asks Xiao Feng if she would rather he left. She tells him that he should decide his future on his own. Yi Cheng confesses his feelings to Xiao Feng one last time, and she rejects him, saying, "I can't carry such a heavy burden."

== Cast ==
=== Xing family ===
Actor	Character	Notes
Aaron Yan (炎亞綸)	Xing Yi Cheng (邢一誠)	A first-year sociology student, a genius and athlete who is not very sociable and prefers to be alone. Xiao Feng changed his perspective on love, stirring up emotions he hadn't felt in a long time.
Calvin Chen (辰亦儒)	Xing Da Ye (邢大業)	A first-year economics student, who is very friendly and lives life to the fullest. Afraid to be alone, he is always surrounded by girls but doesn't understand "love" until he discovers his feelings for Xiao Feng.
Frances Wu (吳兆絃)	Xing Gu Du (邢古都)	Yi Cheng's precious little sister, who looks up to him and generally acts like an adult. She vents her anger and jealousy on Xiao Feng, who tries to understand Gu Du and softens Gu Du's heart.
Wang Xia (王俠)	Jack (邢爺爺)	Yi Cheng and Da Ye's 70-year-old grandfather, the retired founder of a food company who hopes one of them will be his successor. He has a good-humoured personality and loves to spend time with young people.
Bili Wang (比莉)	Rose (邢奶奶)	Yi Cheng and Da Ye's elegant grandmother, who has been with Jack since she was 18.
Jane Wang (王靜瑩)	Zhuang Ya Han (莊雅涵)	Da Ye's outspoken mother, a confident career woman who treats her grown son more like a younger brother.
Ying Cai Ling (應采靈)		Yi Cheng's mother, a quiet and gentle lady.

=== Hu family ===
Actor	Character	Notes
Reen Yu (喻虹淵)	Hu Xiao Feng (胡小風)	A first year sociology student. A helper to the neighbourhood mothers, she is liked by all their children and knows how to make them smile.
Liang You Lin (梁又琳)	Hu Xiao Yun (胡小雲)	Xiao Feng's sister, a cartoonist who works from home. She sometimes calls on her sister and the cousins to help her meet her deadlines, and is inspired to create a manga about a love triangle which becomes very popular.
Bu Xue Liang (卜學亮)	Hu Wan Jun (胡萬峻)	Xiao Feng's happy father, who works as sales staff for a shopping channel. He has a friendly relationship with his daughters.
Lotus Wang (王彩樺)	Jiang Cai Juan (江彩娟)	Xiao Feng's mother, who reviews food online but doesn't know how to cook.

=== Others ===
Actor	Character	Notes
Shumetheny Chen (陳德修)	Ah Ji (阿基)	A first-year economics student from Penghu, who lives off-campus and works in the school cafeteria. He plays a guitar for confidence with women, though this doesn't work well for him.
Cynthia Wang (王心如)	Teng Qiu Ying (藤秋櫻)	A second-year economics student, an admired campus beauty and president of the tennis club. She became best friends with Xiao Feng and romantically pursued Da Ye.
Patty Hou (侯佩岑)	Yi Ying Zhi (易穎芝)	A former Xing company secretary who is in a long-distance relationship. She turns to Ah Yi when she has a problem or is lonely, treating him like a little brother despite his love for her.
Wei Wei (幃幃)	Xiao Sen (小森)	A first-year sociology student and friend of Xiao Feng who thinks quickly and advises with Xiao Feng's love problems.
Qiu Er (球兒)	Da Lin (大林)	A first-year sociology student and friend of Xiao Feng who offers advice on guys based on knowledge of her five brothers.
Amber An (安心亞)	Ying Jin (宜靜)	The secretary of the student's council, she has a crush on Ah Yi and tries to attract his attention.

=== Guest star ===
Actor	Character
Wu Xiong (五熊/蔡頤榛)	Customer of a restaurant
Bo Yan (博焱)	Customer of a restaurant
Benji (班傑)	Customer of a restaurant who borrowed a chair from Xiao Feng's table
Si Wei Hongzheng (寺唯宏正)	Customer of a restaurant
Han (寒/蔡芷紜)	Customer of a restaurant
Ken Wu (吳建恆)	Radio DJ
Pets Tseng (曾沛慈)	Da Ye's senior

== Music ==
=== Opening theme ===
- Song Title: "Guardian Star" (守護星)
- Lyricist: 陳信延
- Composer: JerryC, 郭偉聰
- Singer: Fahrenheit (飛輪海)

=== Ending theme ===
- Song Title: "Mistake" (誤會)
- Lyricist: 藍小邪
- Composer: JerryC、楊子朴
- Singer: Fahrenheit (飛輪海)

=== Insert songs ===
- Song Title: "Exit" (出口)
- Lyricist: Shu Chen (東城衛 脩)
- Composer: Shu Chen
- Singer: Dong Cheng Wei (東城衛)
- Song Title: "Two In The Rain" (雨の中の二人)
- Composer: 利根一郎

== Ratings ==
Formosa Television (FTV) (民視) Ratings
Original date of broadcast	Episode	Ratings	Ranking
19 December 2010	1	1.09	2
26 December 2010	2	1.02	3
2 January 2011	3	0.88	2
9 January 2011	4	0.88	2
16 January 2011	5	1.04	1
23 January 2011	6	1.41	1
30 January 2011	7	1.82	1
6 February 2011	8	1.41	1
13 February 2011	9	1.13	2
20 February 2011	10	1.22	2
27 February 2011	11	1.32	1
6 March 2011	12	1.28	2
13 March 2011	13	1.15	2
Average		1.20	–

- Rival dramas on air at the same time: Channel-X, Four Gifts, Sunny Happiness and Gossip Girl.
- Source: China Times

== Publications ==
=== Love Buffet Pictorial Book ===
- Publisher: TTV Cultural Enterprise Ltd. (台视文化事业股份有限公司)
- Release date: 17 December 2010

== International broadcast ==
- Singapore: StarHub TV and E City (CH825) from 1 January 2011 on Saturdays at 1100 and 1900; and E City [+2] (CH826) at 1300 and 2100
- Malaysia: Astro Shuang Xing 雙星 (CH324) from 13 April 2011 at weekdays and Saturdays on 2230 and 1330
- Thailand: ThaiTV3 (CH3) from 3 November 2012 on Saturday 01.35–04.00 and Sunday 02.00–03.25
