= Mysterious Incredible Terminator =

- Promotional poster
- Also known as: 霹靂MIT
- Genre: Mystery; Comedy; Fantasy; Action; Romance
- Directed by: Lin Qing Zhen (林清振)
- Starring: Aaron Yan; Gui Gui; Alien Huang; Christine Fan
- Opening theme: "動脈" Dong Mai (Artery) by Fahrenheit
- Ending theme: "熱血精神" Re Xue Jing Shen(Red-Blooded Spirit) by Christine Fan
- Country of origin: Taiwan
- Original language: Mandarin
- No. of episodes: 16

Production
- Executive producer: Lin Qing Zhen (林清振)
- Production locations: Taipei, Taiwan
- Running time: 80 minutes (Saturdays at 22:30 to 00:00)
- Production company: Three Giant Productions

Original release
- Network: Gala Television (GTV)
- Release: 8 November 2008 – 21 February 2009

Mysterious Incredible Terminator (Chinese: 霹靂MIT; pinyin: Pi Li MIT, a.k.a. The Clue Collector) is a 2008 Taiwanese television series starring Aaron Yan, Gui Gui, Alien Huang and Christine Fan. It was produced by Three Giant Productions (三匠影視有限公司).

It was broadcast on cable TV Gala Television (GTV) Variety Show/CH 28 (八大綜合台) from 8 November 2008 to 21 February 2009, every Saturdays at 22:30 to 00:00 and free-to-air Formosa Television (FTV) (民視) from 7 November 2008 to 20 February 2009, every Fridays at 22:10–23:40.

== Synopsis ==
The legend of the team Pi Li MIT secretly protecting Sheng Ying School was never publicly acknowledged but nonetheless spread wildly among the student body. But for some reason, the team was disbanded and evil began to wreak havoc in the school after years of peace. Students targeted are those who received an anonymous CD, containing a PC game, from someone called Hei Gui (Black Ghost). The last remaining member of the secret team, Teacher Cherry, decides to recruit the best students, "007" (Zhan Shi De), "187" (Qian Fu Hao), "747" (Huang Hui Hong) and "Tian Mo Xing" (Li Xiao Xing), to form a new generation of Pi Li MIT to solve the crimes and restore the school to its former glory. The new generation of Pi Li MIT must not only find out who the "Black Ghost" is, but also work together and resolve their differences while unlocking the secrets of the school, the students, and themselves.

=== The game ===
- Game No: 1

MIT Player: Zhan Shi De (詹士德) – 007
Game Player: Wen Xin Lan (溫心蘭)
Synopsis:
Zhan Shi De (007), the son of a famous detective, arrives at Sheng Ying School just as a small group of top-graded students who are rumored to be cheating on tests get attacked one after another.

- Game No: 2

MIT Player: Qian Fu Hao (錢富豪) – 187
Game Player: Jin Ji La (金吉菈)
Synopsis:
A wealthy female student gets kidnapped days before a theater play with her as the lead actress. Her friend fears that she may be the next target. At the same time, Qian Fu Hao (187) receives messages from the kidnapper.

- Game No: 3

MIT Player: Huang Hui Hong (黃輝宏) – 747
Game Player: Huang Xin Yi (黃心怡)
Synopsis:
Rumors of a dead student's ghost begin spreading around the school grounds. In the meantime, weird events begin to occur in the school.

- Game No: 4

MIT Player: Li Xiao Xing (李曉星) – Tian Mo Xing (天魔星)
Game Player: Chen Yi Hong (陳逸宏)
Synopsis:
Two girl students, whom befriend an online chatter named "Bad Wolf", get attacked when he tells them he wants to meet them face-to-face. For some reason, Li Xiao Xing (Tian Mo Xing) receives the same message from Bad Wolf.

- Game No: 5

MIT Player: Tao Mei Ren (陶美人) – Miss Cherry (Cherry 老師)
Game Player: Dai Zhi Xun (戴志勛)
Synopsis:
Miss Cherry has attacked two students, one of whom knows her darkest secret. Would she kill to keep that secret from being exposed to the world? And what secret might that be?

- Game No: 6

MIT Player: Zhan Shi De (詹士德) – 007
Game Player: Yang Ming Wei (楊明偉)
Synopsis:
An angel has fallen from the heavens and come to Sheng Ying School to purify the unclean students, but at the cost of their souls. Meanwhile, 007's ex-girlfriend transfers to Sheng Ying School.

- Game No: 7

MIT Player: Zhan Shi De (詹士德) – 007
Game Player: Cai Ya Qing (蔡雅菁)
Synopsis:
A girl student has been stalked by an unknown stalker for over a week, and she suspects that it is most probably someone from her Science Club. So she turns to 007 for protection. Huang Hui Hong (747) unintentionally reveals his feelings to Tian Mo Xing.

- Game No: 8

MIT Player: Li Xiao Xing (李曉星) – Tian Mo Xing (天魔星)
Game Player: Lin Bo Qing (林柏青)
Synopsis:
Someone starts attacking students the same way as how Tian Mo Xing wrote in her murder stories, which she posts in her blog. Meanwhile, Tian Mo Xing makes her decision between 007 and 747.

- Game No: 9

MIT Players: Zhan Shi De (詹士德) – 007
Li Xiao Xing (李曉星) – Tian Mo Xing (天魔星)
Huang Hui Hong (黃輝宏) – 747
Qian Fu Hao (錢富豪) – 187
Tao Mei Ren (陶美人) – Miss Cherry (Cherry 老師)
Game Player: Xu Wan Xin (許萬欣)
Synopsis:
The members of Pi Li MIT are put in danger while hunting a stalker, who seems to be setting them up every time something happens. The mystery of the last team's splitting begins to unfold...

- Game No: 10

MIT Players: Zhan Shi De (詹士德) – 007
Tao Mei Ren (陶美人) – Miss Cherry (Cherry 老師)
Game Player: Zheng Wen Long (鄭文龍)
Synopsis:
A website known as justice.com.tw has been created. With its creation, the webmaster gets information about whoever gets bullied or hurt, and would punish the culprit with no mercy. While investigating the case, Pi Li MIT finally gets hold of a real PC game and Teacher Angel gets kidnapped...

- Game No: 11

MIT Players: Zhan Shi De (詹士德) – 007
Li Xiao Xing (李曉星) – Tian Mo Xing (天魔星)
Huang Hui Hong (黃輝宏) – 747
Qian Fu Hao (錢富豪) – 187
Game Player: He Rui Jia (何瑞家) – Black Ghost (黑鬼)
Synopsis:
It's been days since Pi Li MIT got split up. Teacher Cherry is sent to another country while 007 becomes a top-graded student and 187 loses touch with the others. The only ones continuing their spirits as Pi Li MIT are Tian Mo Xing and 747. This time, Black Ghost is personally going after Teacher Angel's son, Lu Ke Ying. Will they be able to solve the case now that the team is no more? Meanwhile, 747 makes the decision of his life.

- Game No: 12

MIT Players: Zhan Shi De (詹士德) – 007
Li Xiao Xing (李曉星) – Tian Mo Xing (天魔星)
Qian Fu Hao (錢富豪) – 187
Game Player: Chen Yan Xiang (陳彥翔) – Huang Guo Zhong (黃國忠)
Synopsis:
It's Valentine's Day, but Pi Li MIT can't seem to get a break from the coming game players. 187 is reminded of his past by a childhood friend, who was involved in a kidnapping with 187 when he was a child. 007 and Tian Mo Xing are kidnapped and locked inside a room, running out of oxygen. Meanwhile, 007 makes his decision about Tian Mo Xing.

- Game No: 13

MIT Players: Zhan Shi De (詹士德) – 007
Huang Hui Hong (黃輝宏) – 747
Tao Mei Ren (陶美人) – Miss Cherry (Cherry 老師)
Game Players: Li Xiao Xing (李曉星) – Tian Mo Xing (天魔星)
Synopsis:
Teacher Angel's dark past catches up to her when someone tries to remind her of a girl student she liked who committed suicide a year ago after she had an abortion. 007 finds Tian Mo Xing strange with her behavior and suspects she might be the one behind all the malicious games.

- Game No: 14

MIT Player: Li Xiao Xing (李曉星) – Tian Mo Xing (天魔星)
Game Player: Zhan Shi De (詹士德) – 007
Synopsis:
A big panda has kidnapped Tian Mo Xing and is out to expose Teacher Angel's dirty secret. Eventually, the members of Pi Li MIT disappear one after another, but in the end it was 007 and 187 who wanted to test Tian Mo Xing and Teacher Angel. But the game hasn't ended yet and Pi Li MIT still don't know who the true culprit really is.

- Game No: 15

MIT Players: Zhan Shi De (詹士德) – 007
Huang Hui Hong (黃輝宏) – 747
Qian Fu Hao (錢富豪) – 187
Tao Mei Ren (陶美人) – Miss Cherry (Cherry 老師)
Game Player: Lu Ya Qi (陸雅琪) – Teacher Angel (天使老師)
Synopsis:
Teacher Cherry's father is blackmailed by the game's boss and a colleague. The culprit's identity is finally revealed. Though Tian Mo Xing tries to talk him out of playing further, she fails and runs back to Pi Li MIT for help. Teacher Angel uses her son's mischief to her advantage against the principal to dominate the school.

- Game No: 16

MIT Players: Zhan Shi De (詹士德) – 007
Li Xiao Xing (李曉星) – Tian Mo Xing (天魔星)
Huang Hui Hong (黃輝宏) – 747
Qian Fu Hao (錢富豪) – 187
Tao Mei Ren (陶美人) – Miss Cherry (Cherry 老師)
Game Player: Lu Ke Ying (陸克英) – Game King (遊戲大魔王)
Synopsis:
This is it – the final game. Pi Li MIT must pull together all of their strengths and strategies to win this last game, otherwise evil will completely take over the school.

== Cast ==
=== Main cast ===
- Aaron Yan (炎亞綸, from Fahrenheit) as Zhan Shi De (詹士德) – 007
- Gui Gui (鬼鬼) as Li Xiao Xing (李曉星) – Tian Mo Xing (天魔星)
- Alien Huang (黃鴻升 / 小鬼) as Huang Hui Hong (黃輝宏) – 747
- Lu Ting-wei (陸廷威) as Qian Fu Hao (錢富豪) – 187
- Christine Fan (范瑋琪) as Tao Mei Ren (陶美人) Miss Cherry (Cherry 老師)
- Tian Li (田麗) as Lu Ya Qi (陸雅琪) – Teacher Angel (天使老師)
- Zhang Shan Jie (張善傑) as Lu Ke Ying (陸克英) – Game King

=== Additional Cast ===
Episode 1

- Sandrine Pinna as Wen Xin Lan (溫心蘭)
- Huang Tai An (黃泰安) as restaurant owner
- Ai Er (愛兒) as Xiao Ya Qi (蕭亞琪)
- Wan Er (婉兒) as Lin Yi Ting (林宜庭)

Episode 2

- Honduras (宏都拉斯) as Tao Ying Ming (陶英明) – the principal
- Ruby Wang (王心如) as Jin Ji La (金吉菈)
- Wei Wei (瑋瑋) as Lin Li Na (林莉娜)
- Cai Han Cen (蔡函岑) as Huang Xin Yi (黃心怡)
- Huang Tai An (黃泰安) as restaurant owner
- Qiu Jia Wei (丘家維) as childhood 187

Episode 3

- Cai Han Cen (蔡函岑) as Huang Xin Yi (黃心怡)
- Huang Tai An (黃泰安) as restaurant owner
- Mi En (米恩) as Li Gui Ling (李佳玲)
- Sam Huang (黃文炫) as Liu Guan Zhi (劉冠志)
- Chen Zi Ru (陳子孺) as Li Zi Jie (李子傑)
- Xiao Lin Wang Zi (小林王子) as Shen Xiu Jun (沈修君)

Episode 4

- Honduras (宏都拉斯) as Tao Ying Ming (陶英明) – the principal
- Huang Tai An (黃泰安) as restaurant owner
- Xiao Lin Wang Zi (小林王子) as Shen Xiu Jun (沈修君)
- Hank Wu (吳仲強) as Wu Zhi Feng (吳志豐)
- Zhou Xiao An (周孝安) as Chen Yi Hong (陳逸宏)
- Gao Sheng Yun (高聖雲) as Zhang Xuan Hui (張玄惠)

Episode 5

- Qiu Er (球兒) as 187's intel gatherer
- Honduras (宏都拉斯) as Tao Ying Ming (陶英明) – the principal
- Huang Tai An (黃泰安) as restaurant owner
- Jaline Yeh (葉羿君) as Xie Yi Qian (謝宜倩)
- You Ding Gang (游定剛) as Dai Zhi Xun (戴志勛)
- Guo Cheng Lin (郭承霖) as Luo Jia Hao (羅家豪)
- Wasir Zhou (周詠軒) as Yang Ming Wei (楊明偉)

Episode 6

- Huang Tai An (黃泰安) as restaurant owner
- Wasir Zhou (周詠軒) as Yang Ming Wei (楊明偉)
- Xia Rou Zhi (夏如芝) as Lin Yu Jie (林雨潔)
- Xiang Bo Tao (相博濤) as childhood Zhan Shi De
- Han Ruo Zi (韓若紫) as Cai Ya Qing (蔡雅菁)

Episode 7

- Qiu Er (球兒) as 187's intel gatherer
- Zhang Hao Ming as Qiu Shi Hong (邱士鴻)
- Yuan Da (元大) as Dai Ming Zhe (戴明哲)
- Han Ruo Zi (韓若紫) as Cai Ya Qing (蔡雅菁)

Episode 8

- Anthony Guo (郭彥均) as Lin Bo Hong (林柏宏)
- Angus Guo (郭彥甫) as Lin Bo Qing (林柏青)
- Xie Yi Ying (謝易穎) as Du Ming Wei (杜明威)
- Qiu Er (球兒) as 187's intel gatherer
- Honduras (宏都拉斯) as Tao Ying Ming (陶英明) – the principal

Episode 9

- Cai Yi Zhen (蔡宜臻) as Xu Wan Xin (許萬欣)

Episode 10

- Peng Bo Shao (彭博劭) as Zheng Wen Long (鄭文龍)
- Li Xiao Ping (李筱萍) as Yao Qian Hui (姚千慧)
- Mi En (米恩) as Li Jia Ling (李佳玲)
- Luo Neng Hua (羅能華) as Zhang Shi Chang (張世昌)

Episode 11

- Honduras (宏都拉斯) as Tao Ying Ming (陶英明) – the principal
- Figaro Tseng (曾少宗) as He Rui Jia (何瑞家)
- Yang Xin Qiao (楊芯喬) as Rich Girl (腐女)

Episode 12

- Xu Shi Hao (許時豪) as Chen Yan Xiang (陳彥翔) / Huang Guo Zhong (黃國忠)
- Qiu Jia Wei (丘家維) as childhood 187
- Peng Wu Jun (彭武駿) as childhood Chen Yan Xiang
- Huang Tai An (黃泰安) as restaurant owner

Episode 13

- Zhang Jing Zhi (張靜之) as Lin Xiang Ting (林湘婷)
- Darren Wang as Yang Sheng Kai (楊聖凱)
- Honduras (宏都拉斯) as Tao Ying Ming (陶英明) – the principal

Episode 14

- Honduras (宏都拉斯) as Tao Ying Ming (陶英明) – the principal

Episode 15

- Honduras (宏都拉斯) as Tao Ying Ming (陶英明) – the principal
- Xu Gui Ying (徐貴櫻) as Cherry's mother
- Huang Tai An (黃泰安) as restaurant owner

Episode 16

- Honduras (宏都拉斯) as Tao Ying Ming (陶英明) – the principal
- Chuan Xian Hao (傳顯皓) as childhood Lu Ke Ying

== Character Profiles ==
- Tao Mei Ren (陶美人) – Miss Cherry (Cherry 老師)

Daughter of Sheng Ying School's principal, and the leader and founder of Pi Li MIT. She acts as counselor in the school. Cherry is very good at observing people around her, and so finds the four students; Zhan Shi De (007), Li Xiao Xing (Tian Mo Xing), Huang Hui Hong (747) and Qian Fu Hao (187), her best choices in making members of her team.
She hopes to be the guiding light of students, and never fails to spot those who are feeling guilty. One of her other skills include acting.
It was later revealed that she lied about being part of the last Pi Li MIT, and that she was the one who caused the last Pi Li MIT to split up; with the leader breaking his leg when trying to help her. She has felt guilty ever since then.
She is later found out to be the half sister of Lu Ke Ying and Li Xiao Xing.
After the games were over, she became the substitute principal of Sheng Ying College while her father is in America with Teacher Angel and Lu Ke Ying.

- Zhan Shi De (詹士德) – 007

The male protagonist of Mysterious Incredible Terminator. He is the son of a famous international detective named Dr. James, and an unofficial member of Pi Li MIT. Zhan Shi De aimed to enter the police academy as their best intern, but because he suffered from Ménière's disease, a disease he has had since childhood, his place in the academy was dismissed. He was later sent to Sheng Ying School and was immediately appointed by Teacher Cherry to join Pi Li MIT under the codename "007", as their most intelligent member. Though he did not want to be a member of the group at first, he eventually finds the interest of being a part of it.
His intelligence goes beyond most people, but his cold personality shields away his feelings, which makes it difficult for him to let his teammate, Tian Mo Xing, know how he feels about her. His love life becomes more complicated when he finds out that his other teammate, 747, is in love with Tian Mo Xing. He always seems to smile whenever something is related to Tian Mo Xing.
Eventually, he accepts Tian Mo Xing just before he finds out that she is one of the culprits behind the dangerous games, but also finds her unwilling to continue and decides to solve the mystery to free her from the ties.

- Li Xiao Xing (李曉星) – Tian Mo Xing (天魔星)

The female protagonist of Mysterious Incredible Terminator. She is the adopted daughter of a fortune teller named "Fan Lian Xin". Her innocence and acting skills make her the perfect secret agent. Her potential skills include following her own instincts, which always leads her to trouble. Her codename in Pi Li MIT is "Tian Mo Xing", meaning "Heaven Devil Star"; a name mixed with "Sirius" and "Voldemort". She wants to publish a horror novel, but since she lacks the inspiration, she decides to make use of everything that happens within the school as inspiration.
Tian Mo Xing is very fond of 007, who also has feelings for her, though he tries to hide it. Her love life becomes more complicated when she finds out 747 also has feelings for her. But it eventually decreases when 747 decides to walk away and 007 finally decides to accept her.
It was later found out that Li Xiao Xing is actually Teacher's Angel's abandoned daughter and Lu Ke Ying's twin sister. In addition, she is the half sister of Teacher Cherry. She has been helping her brother with the games from the beginning, but truthfully, she didn't want to play the games or hurt anyone. In the end, she decides to truly join Pi Li MIT to stop her brother.

- Huang Hui Hong (黃輝宏) – 747

Very masculine and filled with justice senses. Aims to be the hero whenever something happens. He has been predicted to not be able to live to the age of twenty, which is why he finds joining Pi Li MIT a great opportunity to do something extraordinary before he dies. His codename in the team is "747". Though he lacks intelligence, his speed and hearing goes beyond most people.
He is very fond of the team's girl member, Tian Mo Xing, but his feelings become shrouded when he finds out that she likes 007. After getting provoked by 007 and finding out that he might have a chance to change his fate after all, he decides to reveal his feelings to Tian Mo Xing and declares a rivalry with 007. But in the end, he sees the strong bond between Tian Mo Xin and 007 and decides to give up. After he finds out Tian Mo Xing is one of the game culprits, he still trusts her wholeheartedly.
Since Huang Hui Hong has an overwhelming sense of justice, it is possible that he is the first to join Pi Li MIT.

- Qian Fu Hao (錢富豪) – 187

Son of a rich family with an elegant personality and the looks of an idol. He has electrifying eyes, and gathers information from the girls who chase after him. Because of this, Fu Hao is appointed to Pi Li MIT as the most resourceful member under the codename "187". He was kidnapped once as a child, and almost drowned. Somehow, he received a necklace noting "MIT" from the kidnapping, which comes from Pi Li MIT of 1993. Because he almost drowned that time, he had been afraid of fish and the ocean ever since. When one of the game players made him relive the experience, he is reminded that he was kidnapped along with a childhood best friend and lost touch with him after the kidnappers separated them. And the game player was actually his long-lost friend.
A running joke is that he always nicknames his girls "Bao Bei" ("Precious"). And though he is somewhat of a pervert, he is also chivalric.
187 often teases 007, Tian Mo Xing and 747 for their triangle relationship before 007 and Tian Mo Xing became a couple.

- Lu Ya Qi (陸雅琪) – Teacher Angel (天使老師)

Known as "the God of Death teacher" and "Teacher Angel" for her strict personality. She accepts no mistake in her work. Because she never seems to get any older, people describe her as the devil.
She is very protective of her son Lu Ke Ying and looks up to people with power and order. And so despises Pi Li MIT because it is gathered with blacklisted students.
Turns out, she was a member of Pi Li MIT between 1989 and 1993. Because she accidentally got pregnant with the principal's children, she was paid by his wife to secretly give birth to her children in America, and has kept their father's identity a secret over the years.
She is trying to create a group called the "Genius Revolution Project" gathered with students that have gone against Pi Li MIT.
Lu Ya Qi gave Li Xiao Xing (Her daughter) to her best friend, Fang Lian Xin, when she was just a baby.
She went to America with her son and ex-lover (the principal) after everything was over to treat her son's illness.

- Lu Ke Ying (陸克英)

The son of Lu Ya Qi. He was often bullied by his classmates for being protected by his mother and for having no father. Ke Ying grew up without a real family, and had lived with a mental illness since childhood.
For some reason, he is always involved in Pi Li MIT's cases.
It is later found out that he is Li Xiao Xing's twin brother and that he is also the one behind all of the dangerous games. In addition, he is half siblings with Teacher Cherry. He is using the games to see if his mother truly loves the school or him and his twin sister Li Xiao Xing, and at the same time get back at the principal, who is actually his father.
When his sister falls in love with Pi Li MIT's member, 007, and tells him she wants to stop the games, he becomes more than determined to play to the end.
He went to America for treatment to his mental illness after everything was over.

== Production credits ==
- Director: Lin Qing Zhen (林清振)
- Screenwriter: Chen Hui Zhen (陳惠真) / Xie Shu Fang (謝叔芳)
- Producer: Lin Qing Zhen (林清振)

== Production and release ==
- Actor Julian Yang (楊士萱) was originally the role of 187, but after one month of filming, he was arrested for sexual harassment and the character was replaced by Lu Ting Wei (陸廷威) and filming had to begin anew in February. The series began filming on 1 January 2008, but due to Julian Yang's case, the shooting had to be pushed back and start anew on 18 February.
- Hebe Tien Fu Zhen, a member of a popular Taiwan girl group S.H.E is originally the main female lead (Li Xiao Xing/Tian Mo Xing) for Mysterious Incredible Terminator. Due to her hectic schedules, her role was replaced by Gui Gui.
- The DVD edition of Mysterious Incredible Terminator started release in December, 2008.
- A Cantonese dubbed set of this series is set to be aired on Hong Kong's i-CABLE Entertainment Channel on 9 March 2009.
- Pi Li MIT is also airing in Singapore but in a cable channel.
- Gui Gui and Aaron Yan won the best onscreen couple after their drama Pi Li MIT.
