= WOW Music =

Hong kong based record label

WOW Music (WOW; 維高文化有限公司) is a Hong Kong–based record label. It was launched on April 13, 2007, with the support of HIM International Music and AsiaMuse Entertainment Group. The company is notably involved in major concert productions and marketing.

== Artists ==
HIM International Music (華研):

Groups: S.H.E, Fahrenheit (飛輪海), Power Station (動力火車) female Artists Hui Min

Male Artists: Tank (呂建中), Yoga Lin (林宥嘉), Peter Pan (潘裕文), Judy Chou (周定緯), Stanly Xu (許仁杰)

Female Artists: Liu Li Yang (劉力揚), Olivia Ong

Asia Muse (亞神亞洲):

Groups: Fusion, Tizzy bac

Male Artists: Ah Niu (阿牛), A Chord (謝和弦)

Female Artists: Tanya Chua (蔡健雅), Rene Liu (劉若英), Sandee Chen (陳姍妮)

Hong Kong:

Group: Sugar Club (糖兄妹)

Male Artists: Paul Wong (黃貫中), Peco Chui (徐偉賢)

Female Artists: Candy Lo (盧巧音)

Taiwan:

Groups: Project Early, Natural Q (自然捲)

Female Artists: Cheer Chen (陳綺貞), Mavis Fan (范曉萱)

Male Artists: Bobby Chen (陳昇), Chang Hung Liang (張洪量), Wu Bai (伍佰), Captain Lu (盧廣仲)

China:

Groups: 夾子道

Female Artists: Yodai (郭易), 趙薇(香港發行)

Independent Labels:

Different Music

Male Artists: Denis Ng (吳彤)

89268 Outstanding independent music label in Hong Kong Artist: In Love, the pliable, ghost style, the darlings, the swamp, Boo

A good day records Taiwanese independent music label Artist 熊寶貝,929, 黃玠…etc.

INTERNATIONAL LABEL Domino Records : The Last Shadow Puppets, Arctic Monkeys...etc. Male DJ Artist : Tiesto

== Partners ==
- HIM International Music
- AsiaMuse Entertainment Group
- Different Music
- 89268
- A Good Day Records
- Domino Recording Company

== See also ==
- List of record labels
