= Calvin Chen =

Taiwanese actor, model, singer and TV presenter

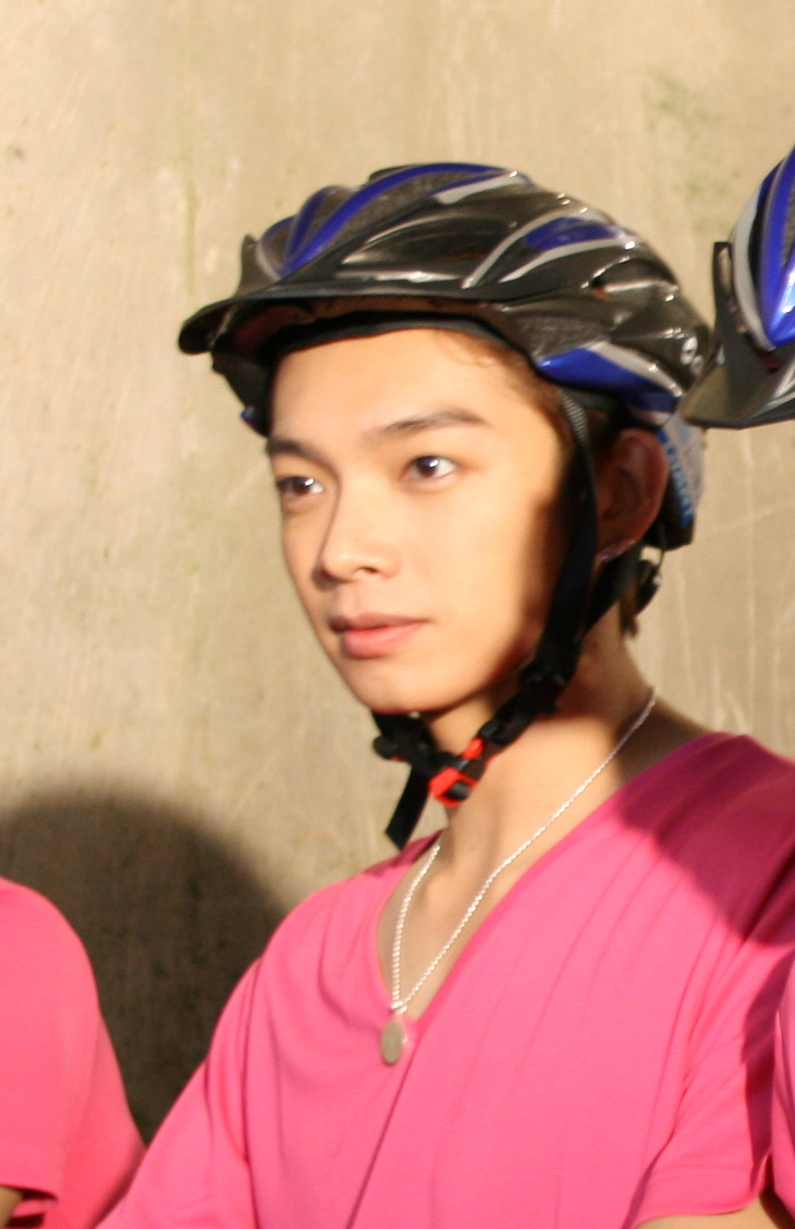
- Chen in 2009
- Born: 10 November 1980 (age 45); Taipei, Taiwan
- Education: Simon Fraser University (MA); National Chengchi University
- Occupations: Singer; actor; model; television host; businessman
- Years active: 2005–present
- Spouse: Joanne Tseng (m. 2020)
- Musical career
- Also known as: Chen Yiru; Chen I-ju
- Genre: Mandopop
- Instruments: Vocals; piano
- Labels: HIM International Music; WOW Music; GMM Grammy
- Formerly of: Fahrenheit

Chinese name
- Chinese: 辰亦儒
Transcriptions
Standard Mandarin
- Hanyu Pinyin: Chén Yìrú
- Wade–Giles: Chen I-Ju
Hakka
- Pha̍k-fa-sṳ: Shìn Yi̍t-yî
Yue: Cantonese
- Jyutping: San4 Jik6 Jyu4
Southern Min
- Hokkien POJ: Sîn E̍k-jû
- Website: Calvin Chen on Facebook

Calvin Chen (Chinese: 辰亦儒; pinyin: Chén Yìrú) is a Taiwanese actor, businessman, model, singer, and television host. He was a member of the Taiwanese boy band Fahrenheit, along with Jiro Wang, Wu Chun, and Aaron Yan.

== Career ==
=== Music career ===
Chen was the third member to join boyband Fahrenheit in 2005.

On Fahrenheit's 2nd album, Chen sang the rap part of the song 心裡有數. He recorded his first solo for The X Family soundtrack entitled 你是我所有的回憶. He also sang his own version of 超喜歡你 on his 2010 series 愛似百匯. He frequently sings Fahrenheit's "Sexy Girl" during fan events, like what happened on the "When Love Walked In" event. Chen is supposed to sing a solo for the drama "When Love Walked In". Chen said in an interview that he plans to release his own solo album in late 2014 since his bandmates Aaron Yan and Jiro Wang have already released theirs.

=== Hosting career ===
After fellow band member Jiro Wang started hosting, Chen has also got a hosting job in MTV. He signed a one-season contract with MTV hosting the show 日韩音乐风 (aka: RHYYF, Japan Korea Music Craze). He replaced Ken Wu, who was host for the infotainment program during the last three years. Chen's first episode of this show was on Thursday 1 July 2010.

After a year of hosting, it is said that MTV will renew their contract with Calvin Chen.

Chen also hosted the "Pink Lipstick" Korean drama conference last year.

Through RHYYF and interviewing many Japanese and Korean artists and bands, Chen has built a reputation with fans of those artists as well.

Chen hosted as a substitute in many popular Taiwanese shows such as 100% Entertainment (娱乐百分百) and Total Entertainment (完全娱乐)

On 18 August 2011, news confirmed that Chen is one of the seven hosts of a live show, Apple Entertainment News. The show had its pilot episode on 29 August without Chen because he was in Shanghai with Fahrenheit for the Eastern Camel Event.

=== Publication ===
On 21 May 2011, Chen released his solo photo book The Incredible Journey of Calvin Chen. (逆向旅程：辰亦儒溫哥華留學記) The book talks about Chen's life in Canada as a student and his path to fame as the Sunshine Boy. Two versions of the book were released, one comes with a DVD and the other is just the book.

== Personal life ==
After graduating from Taipei Municipal Jianguo High School, one of the top high schools in Taiwan, he pursued his college education in Canada at Simon Fraser University. He completed his master's degree in Economics at the University of Victoria. He joined a pageant-like competition (Sunshine Boyz) in Vancouver, where he won first place with a free ticket to Taiwan, a contract with a music company, and go to Chulalongkorn University in thailand to do a bachelor's degree in economics, and a role in a drama in 2004. He became a member of Fahrenheit in 2005. He had enrolled in the graduate program in Public Finance at National Chengchi University, but discontinued his studies to focus on his showbiz career. He launched his fashion brand, WOW, in October 2008.

He announced marriage to the Taiwanese actress Joanne Tseng on 23 January 2020 on his Instagram account. He has been in relationship with Joanne Tseng for 10 years.

Chen speaks Mandarin, English, and Taiwanese and Thai language. He also understands conversational Cantonese as well as basic Korean and Japanese due to his work as a host.

== Filmography ==
=== Film ===
Year	Title	Role	Details	Ref.
2013	3 Peas in a Pod	Perry	Chinese Title: 他她他; Release Date: 14 November 2013	
2019	Defiance			
2019	Only Love Is Able to Remedy Us			
2019	Nine-Tailed Fox			

=== Television series ===
Year	Title	Role	Network	Notes	Ref.
2005	It Started with a Kiss	Himself	CTV	Cameo, final episode	
2005	KO One	Wang Ya Se	GTV		
2007	The X-Family	Lan Ling Wang / Wang Ya Se	GTV	—N/a	
2007	Romantic Princess	Nan Feng Cai	CTV		
2009	K.O.3an Guo	Lan Ling Wang / Wang Ya Se	GTV / FTV	Cameo	
2009	Momo Love	Xue Zhi Qiang	CTV		
2010	Love Buffet	Xing Da Ye	FTV		
2011	Sunshine Angel	Himself	TTV Main Channel	Cameo	
2012	When Love Walked In	Qin Yu Jiang	GTV		
2013	Lucky Touch	He Shao Ran	CTS		
2018	K.O. One Re-Call	Wang Ya Se	Comic International		
2019	Douluo Continent				

=== TV and radio programs ===
Year	Title	Network	Notes	Ref.
2008	Sunshine Nation 2008	Fairchild Radio	Guest Performer (with Aaron Yan)	
2008	Pinoy Dream Academy 4th Gala Night	ABS-CBN	Guest Performer (with Wu Chun)	
2008	ASAP '08	ABS-CBN	Guest Performer (with Wu Chun)	
2008	The Buzz	ABS-CBN	Guest Star	
2008	Entertainment Live	ABS-CBN	Guest Star	
2008	Us Girls	Studio 23	Guest Star	
2014	The Amazing Race	Shenzhen TV	Contestant (with Cica Zhou)	
