= Wu Chun =

Bruneian actor, singer, and model (born 1979)

- 吳尊
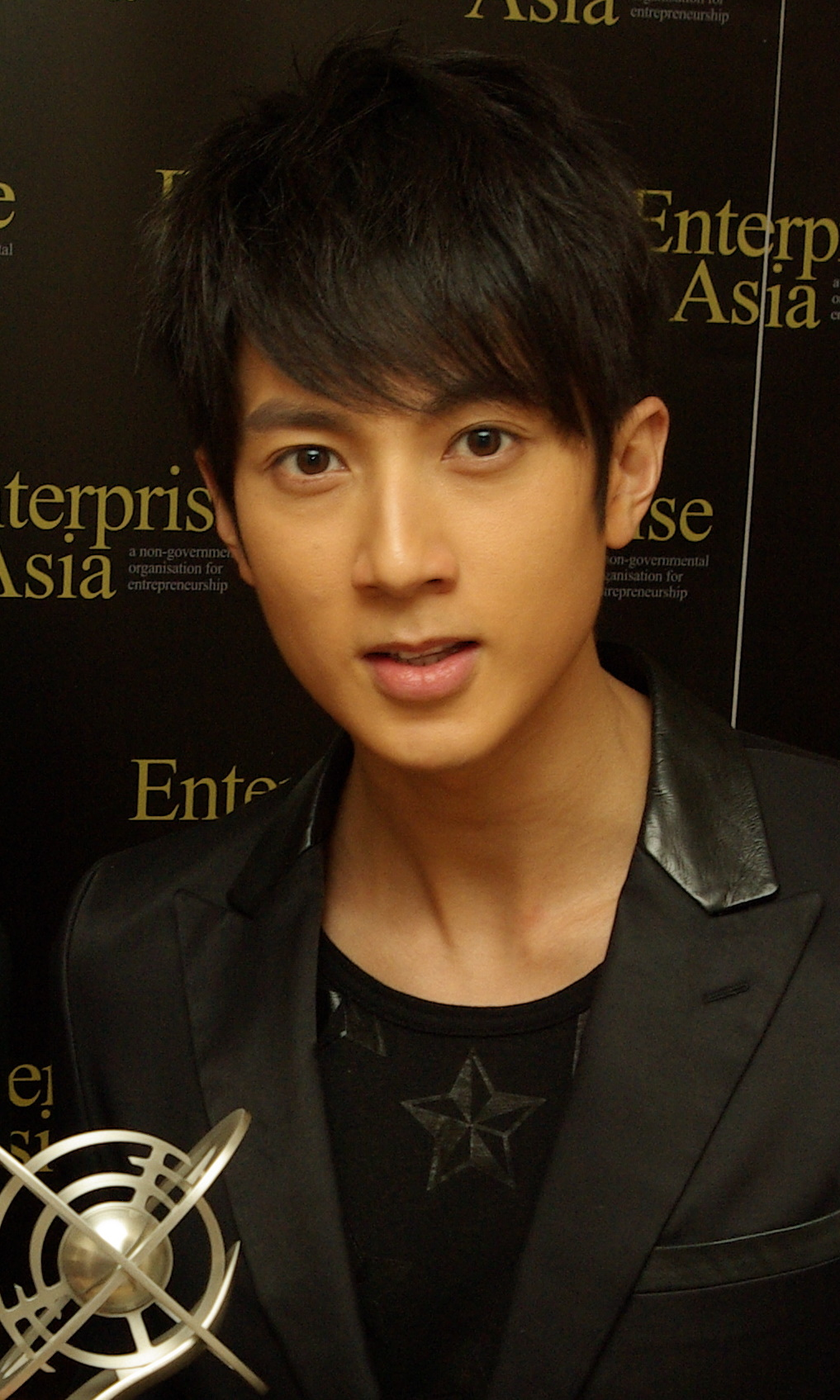
- Wu in 2008
- Born: Goh Kiat Chun (吳吉尊); 10 October 1979 (age 46); Bandar Seri Begawan, Brunei
- Education: Chung Hwa Middle School
- Alma mater: Royal Melbourne Institute of Technology
- Occupations: Singer; actor; model; philanthropist; entrepreneur
- Years active: 2005–present
- Spouse: Lin Liying (m. 2004)
- Children: Max (son); Neinei (daughter)
- Relatives: Goh King Chin (uncle)
- Musical career
- Genres: Mandopop
- Instruments: Vocals; drums; percussion
- Labels: HIM International Music; WOW Music; Pony Canyon; Fu Long Production

Chinese name
- Traditional Chinese: 吳尊
- Simplified Chinese: 吴尊
Transcriptions
Standard Mandarin
- Hanyu Pinyin: Wú Zūn

Birth name
- Traditional Chinese: 吳吉尊
- Simplified Chinese: 吴吉尊
Transcriptions
Standard Mandarin
- Hanyu Pinyin: Wú Jízūn
Southern Min
- Hokkien POJ: Gô͘ Kiat-chun
- Website: www.chunzone.com

Goh Kiat Chun (Chinese: 吳吉尊, born 10 October 1979), known as Wu Chun (Chinese: 吳尊; pinyin: Wú Zūn), is a Bruneian singer, actor, and entrepreneur. He was a founding member of Fahrenheit, a Taiwanese Mandopop vocal quartet boy band. He left the group in June 2011. Wu has appeared in numerous Taiwanese television series including Tokyo Juliet, Hanazakarino Kimitachihe, Romantic Princess, Hot Shot, Sunny Girl, and The Kindaichi Case Files (2012–13). His film roles include The Butterfly Lovers (2008) and Lady of the Dynasty. He maintains a presence on Sina Weibo.

In 2014, Wu participated in the reality television program Dad is Back with his daughter. He appeared in the Chinese drama Martial Universe in 2018 and was later featured in the reality show The Best Time, alongside his father, Wu Jing Tian. In early 2020, he appeared in the reality series Before Wedding, which was filmed in Brunei. That year, a wax figure of Wu Chun was unveiled at Madame Tussauds in Shanghai. Since 2019, he has been a brand ambassador for BOSS Eyewear.

Wu is also active in environmental advocacy. He was named a Pangolin Protection Ambassador by the World Wildlife Fund. In 2022, he appeared in advertising campaigns for Dior and La Mer, and he became a representative for IQIYI during the 2023 Australian Open.

== Early life and education ==
Wu Chun was born into a family of Chinese descent, with ancestral roots in Lieyu, Kinmen, Fujian, in China. Wu's father, Goh Kim Tian, is a real estate investor. His family also owns a car agency and maintains ties to the royal family of Brunei.

He studied at Chung Hwa Middle School in Bandar Seri Begawan, Brunei. In 1997, he joined the Foundation Studies program at Trinity College, Melbourne, before continuing his studies at the Royal Melbourne Institute of Technology in Melbourne, where he earned a bachelor's degree in Business Administration.

He represented Brunei in national basketball competitions.

Before joining Fahrenheit, Wu worked as a model for Yilin in Taiwan and Diva Models in Singapore. He is the managing director of Fitness Zone, a health club in Brunei, and has had business ventures in several countries, including the United States and China.

== Career ==
As a model, Wu appeared on magazine covers including Esquire, Elle, Men, and GQ.

Wu’s ventures in Brunei's fitness and health industry include Bake Culture, The Energy Kitchen, Fitness Zone, and Women's Hair Salon. In China, he has been a director of television advertisements for InterContinental Hotels. He has been involved in commercial endorsements and charitable activities.

He received multiple honors throughout his career, including the Asia Pacific Entrepreneurship Awards (APEA) Young Entrepreneur of the Year (2008), the CQE Geneva QC Total Quality Management Model Award (2012), and an APEA Corporate Social Responsibility Award (2013). In 2015, Hassanal Bolkiah, the King of Brunei, presented Wu with an Excellent Youth Award.

Wu was chosen to be an ambassador for the Brunei Anti-Narcotics Drug Association in 2012. In 2014, he became the international brand ambassador of Royal Brunei Airlines and a Taiwan tourism ambassador.

In 2018, Wu Chun became the Goodwill Ambassador for Dementia Brunei, an advocacy organization dedicated to the early detection and prevention of dementia through the promotion of healthy lifestyles. Fitness Zone also became an advocate, conducting monthly talks for the public. That year, he also became an ambassador for Legoland China.

== Personal life ==
Wu Chun and his family live in Brunei. Wu is the nephew of Legislative Council of Brunei MP Goh King Chin. Wu married Lin Liying in 2004. Their marriage was first disclosed publicly in 2013 and reconfirmed in 2019. Together, Wu and Lin have two children, a daughter named Neinei and a son named Max. They held a delayed wedding ceremony as a part of the Chinese variety show Before Wedding, which first aired in March 2020 on Mango TV.

Wu's mother died of cancer in 2002.

== Filmography ==
=== Films ===
Year	English title	Original title	Role	Notes
2008	The Butterfly Lovers	武俠梁祝	Liang Zhongshan	
2010	14 Blades	錦衣衛	Judge of the Sands	
2011	My Kingdom	大武生	Yilong	
2011	Magic to Win	開心魔法	Ling Fung / Earth Magician	
2012	Saving General Yang	忠烈楊家將	Yang Liulang	
2014	Lady of the Dynasty	王朝的女人·楊貴妃		
2018	Guardians of the Tomb	謎巢	Luke	A Chinese–Australian co-production
2018	My Other Home	纽约人在北京		

=== Television ===
Year	English title	Original title	Role	Notes/Ref.
2005	It Started with a Kiss	惡作劇之吻	Himself (guest appearance)	
2005	KO One	終極一班	Tian Hong Guang / Wu Shizun	Cameo
2006	Tokyo Juliet	東方茱麗葉	Ji Fengliang	
2006	Hanazakarino Kimitachihe	花樣少年少女	Zuo Yiquan	
2007	Romantic Princess	公主小妹	Nanfeng Jin	
2007	The X-Family	終極一家	Fire Ambassador	Cameo
2008	Hot Shot	籃球火	Wuji Zun	
2011	Sunny Girl	陽光天使	Di Yaxin	
2013	The Kindaichi Case Files	金田一	Li Byron	
2013	Happy 300 Days	遇見幸福300天	Idol	Cameo
2014	The Kindaichi Case Files Pt. 2	金田一少年之事件簿	Li Byron	
2018	Martial Universe	武动乾坤	Lin Langtian	

=== Variety show ===
Year	English title	Original title	Notes	Ref.
2014	Dad Is Back	爸爸回来了	Cast member alongside daughter Neinei	
2017	Daddy Where Are You Going Season 5	爸爸去哪儿 第5季	Cast member alongside daughter Neinei and son Max	
2017	This is Fighting Robots	这就是铁甲	Team Captain for Blue Team	
2018	Super Penguin League (season 1)	超级企鹅联盟; Super3	Player (live basketball competition)	
2018	The Best Time	最美的时光	Cast member alongside his father	
2020	Before Wedding	婚前21天	Cast member alongside his wife, Lin Liying	
2021	Ice on Fire	冰雪正当燃		
2022	Ambassadors Kitchen	大使的厨房		
2022	Champion VS Champion	冠军对冠军		
2023	Dunk of China Season 5	这！就是灌篮 第五季		

== Awards and nominations ==
Year	Award	Result
2006	TVB8 Awards: Bronze: Best Group	Won
2006	HK Metro Hits Awards: Best Foreign Newcomer	Won
2006	AF Golden Globes 2006: Taiwan's Most Improved Actor	Won
2007	Top Song, TVB8 Awards: "Really Like You" 超喜歡你	Won
2007	Sprite Awards: Most Popular Idol Group (Taiwan)	Won
2007	Sprite Awards: "Only Have Feelings For You" 只對你有感覺 Favourite Duet Song	Won
2007	Sprite Awards: Best Group (Taiwan & Hong Kong)	Won
2007	13th Chinese Music Awards: Best New Group	Won
2007	KKBOX Music Charts: "Only Have Feelings For You" 只對你有感覺: Top 20 Songs of the Year	Won
2007	KKBOX Music Charts: "Hanazakarino Kimitachihe Original Soundtrack" 花樣少年少女: Best Drama Soundtrack	Won
2007	HITO Music Awards 2007: Best Male Group	Won
2019	Shanghai Television Festival: Best Breakthrough Performance Artist	Won

=== Personal ===
- Youth Outstanding Award (2015)
