= Fahrenheit (Taiwanese band) =

Taiwanese boy band

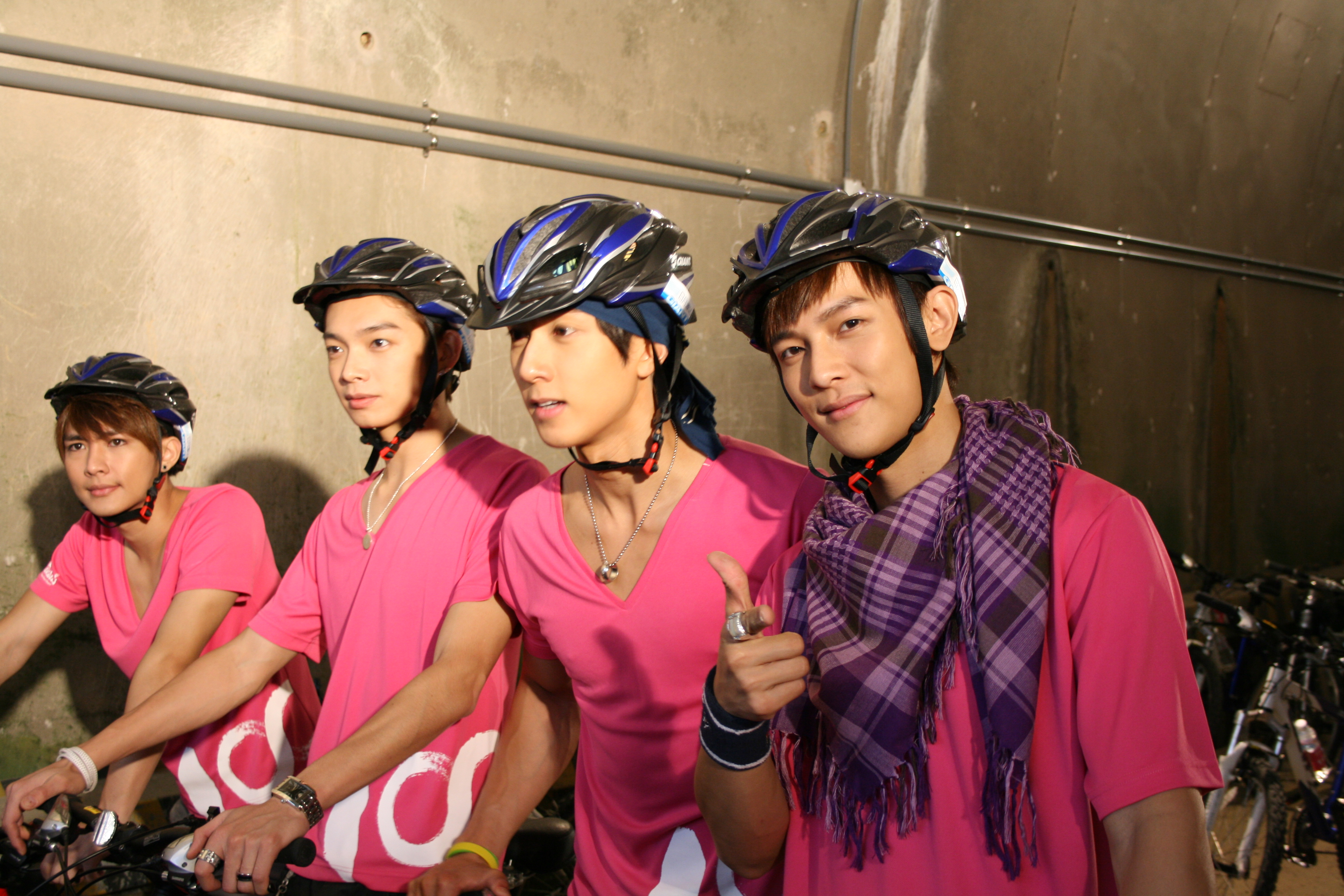
- Fahrenheit in 2009; From left to right: Aaron Yan, Calvin Chen, Wu Chun, Jiro Wang

Background information
- Origin: Taipei, Taiwan
- Genres: Mandopop; pop; J-pop; EDM
- Years active: 2005–2012
- Labels: HIM International Music (Taiwan); WOW Music (HK); Pony Canyon (Japan); GMM Grammy (Thailand)
- Members: Calvin Chen; Jiro Wang; Wu Chun; Aaron Yan

Chinese name
- Traditional Chinese: 飛輪海
- Simplified Chinese: 飞轮海
Transcriptions
Standard Mandarin
- Hanyu Pinyin: Fēilúnhǎi
Hakka
- Pha̍k-fa-sṳ: Fui Lûn-hói
Yue: Cantonese
- Jyutping: Fei1 Leon4 Hoi2
Southern Min
- Hokkien POJ: Hui Lûn-hái

Fahrenheit (Chinese: 飛輪海; pinyin: Fēilúnhǎi) was a Taiwanese boy band composed of members Calvin Chen, Jiro Wang, Wu Chun, and Aaron Yan. They were formed in 2005 by Comic International Productions and HIM International Music and GMM Grammy in Thailand. Their music is distributed by WOW Music in Hong Kong and by Pony Canyon in Japan. Fahrenheit ware often associated with their labelmate seniors S.H.E, who are also under HIM International Music.

In June 2011, Wu announced his decision to leave the group to focus on his acting career, but is open to the idea of reuniting with Fahrenheit in the future. Following Wu Chun's departure, the remaining members also went off to pursue solo projects, putting the group in an indefinite hiatus.

== Background ==
Fahrenheit first gained minor recognition around late 2005 when they first acted altogether in the series, KO One, was broadcast on television in Taiwan. Wu Chun joined the group later in late 2005. On December 28, 2005, Fahrenheit officially became a vocal quartet boy band.

Derived from the definition of Fahrenheit, each of the four members represents a season or temperature that corresponds with their different personalities. Calvin Chen represents spring, warm; Jiro Wang represents summer, hot; Wu Chun represents autumn, cool; and lastly, Aaron Yan represents winter, cold. Each of the four members also has his respective temperature represented on the Fahrenheit scale: Calvin Chen is at 77 degrees, Jiro Wang is at 95 degrees, Wu Chun is at 59 degrees, and Aaron Yan is at 41 degrees. Each of their temperatures are separated by 18 degrees.

== Members ==
- Calvin Chen (vocals, tenor, rap)

After Calvin Chen graduated from one of the top high schools in Taiwan, he further pursued his college education in Canada, where he completed his Master's degree in Economics at University of Victoria. He entered a pageant-like competition called Sunshine Boyz in Vancouver and won first place with a free ticket to Taiwan and a contract with a music company. Calvin Chen comes from a very traditional family, where his father, at first, disapproved of his career as an idol. It is rumored that Calvin Chen was going to be on "Guess Guess Guess" in 2001, because of getting first place in a singing competition, however, he had to return to Canada and therefore, did not attend the show. After returning to Taiwan, Calvin Chen further pursued his education at a Taiwanese university.

- Jiro Wang (vocals, baritone, rap)

In 2000, Jiro Wang started to work after graduating from Taiwan's Fu-Shin community college, and did part-time jobs wherever he could, such as commercial modeling. BMG, the label that signed him, planned to package him with Jay Chou and Jordan Chan to form a boy band called 3J, but due to 9/11, BMG's stocks crashed and the 3J plan was scrapped. He later joined the army for 2 years, and came back around 2003. Since he was still popular around Taiwan, he was given two roles as a guest-star in Pawnshop No.8 (第8號當舖) and I Love My Wife (安室愛美惠). Then Comic Productions approached him, and gave him the supporting role of Ah Jin (金元豐) in 'It Started with a Kiss'. Jiro was the first person to be contracted. Calvin, Aaron, and later Wu Chun joined him and formed Fahrenheit.

- Joseph Wu Chun (vocals, bass)

Joseph Wu Chun was born in Brunei and is of Chinese descent (his ancestors were from Fujian). He graduated from RMIT University in Melbourne, Australia, with a bachelor's degree in Business Administration. Prior to joining Fahrenheit, Wu worked as a model for Yilin in Taiwan and Diva Models in Singapore. He was introduced to the entertainment industry during a trip to Taiwan at around mid-November 2005. A television producer discovered him during this trip, and recommended him to play the lead male role of Tokyo Juliet, which Wu accepted.

After some time, Wu Chun admitted that he had married and had a daughter and he left the group in order to spend more time with his family. He will not be making an album with his bandmates because of his two movies in Hong Kong. Wu Chun concluded that he will make future albums with them.

- Aaron Yan (vocals, tenor)

Aaron Yan was born in Taiwan, but moved to Connecticut at a young age. He later returned to Taiwan for high school and college. He attended the Chinese Culture University, majoring in Journalism but later switched universities and majors in his third year. He is currently on a study hiatus due to work commitments. Around early 2005, comic producers had been searching for elite bloggers around the web. They discovered Yan, who, at that time, was really popular online, and thus recommended him to audition for a role in a drama. Yan thought it was a fraud at first, but after several tests, he realized that it was true. He was given a small role in I Love My Wife (安室愛美惠).

== Music career ==
=== Rise to stardom ===
Before Fahrenheit released their first album on September 28, 2006, they gained minor attention as singers from contributing in several Taiwanese drama soundtracks. Their popularity immediately rose after the soundtracks were released, but was only limited to Taiwan and Mainland China. After their first album was released, their fan base had extended to South Korea, Hong Kong, Singapore, Malaysia, Japan, Philippines, Indonesia and the rest of Southeast Asia . Overseas fans such as from North America and Europe are also getting more familiar with them.

As soon as announcements for their debut album pre-order was released on August 30, 2006, the album broke past 10,000 copies. After its release on September 15, 2006, the album entered the G-music charts and was ranked #2. It was less than 1% below Jay Chou's Still Fantasy album, which came out two weeks prior to the release. Fahrenheit's album sold more than 80,000 copies, an impressive feat, in Taiwan within the first month. Ultimately on the G-music Mandarin Charts their album was ranked 11th for the top 20 of 2006 and stayed in the charts for 17 weeks. Their primary song, or zhuda (Chinese: 主打; pinyin: zhǔ dǎ) song, I Have My Youth (我有我的 Young, Wo You Wo De Young) was on Hong Kong's Global Rhythm List as the Top 16th song for weeks. Their duet with Hebe of girl group S.H.E also won them several popular awards. Fahrenheit was also the first new foreign boy band to have won third place for Best Group at Hong Kong's TVB8 Awards. Although unable to defeat their seniors S.H.E and Twins, who had won first place and second place respectively, they have beaten Hong Kong's local boy bands such as Sun Boy'z and Soler. In less than a year, Fahrenheit has already won eight awards. Despite the outburst of winning multiple awards, there had been debates where fans disagreed with the awards that they have won. The most debated topic was when Fahrenheit won HITO Music Awards 2007's Best Male Group award, arguing that Fahrenheit is too inexperienced to have won the award.

=== Popularity and success ===
With the help of starring in popular dramas, Fahrenheit has been the fastest moving boy band and has quickly gained their status as one of the top boy bands of the year in Taiwan. Within a year, they had already debuted in over 30 different magazine covers all over Asia. They make frequent appearances in Taiwan's Play and Color magazine covers. After their predecessors F4, they are the second Taiwanese boy band to hold a concert in Indonesia with only just one album released. They already held two mini concerts: one in Medan, North Sumatra, Indonesia on March 31 and one in Tsim Sha Tsui, Hong Kong on April 19. Also, they held 2 concerts sponsored by Watsons Water at the end of September 2007: one in Hongkong on September 28, 2007, and one in Guangzhou on September 29, 2007.

=== Major concerts ===
Ever since Fahrenheit's meteoric rise to stardom, HIM has been giving quite a bit exposure for Fahrenheit, such as promoting the group in two of S.H.E's major concerts in Taipei, Singapore and Malaysia where they were seen performing their duet with Hebe as well as their own songs. Ever since their exposure had hit the Hong Kong market their company does not want to miss this chance for more promotion for the group and is currently organizing Fahrenheit's first major concert in Hong Kong in September at the HKCEC. It was reported that they are originally going to hold a concert in Hong Kong's renowned coliseum, Hong Kong Coliseum, but because all of the performances slots are full, they have to move their concert to a different venue. The director of WOW Music expressed that Fahrenheit is currently slated for performing in the HKCEC for two to three nights. In the winter of 2008 they will debut in the Hong Kong Coliseum. as part of their All-Asia Concert. During their All-Asia press conference for the release of their second album in Hong Kong, it was revealed that plans for the All-Asia Concert were in the works. Confirmed concert stops include Taiwan, Hong Kong, Singapore and Malaysia. Towards the end of October, Fahrenheit had their Fantasy Tour stop at Taipei Arena on two nights being October 24, 2009, and October 25, 2009.

== Musical style ==
Fahrenheit's songs mainly fall into the bubblegum pop and pop ballad category. However, songs like Teachable Child (孺子可教 Ru Zi Ke Jiao) and Love's Arrived (愛到 Ai Dao) are intended for a light R&B approach. Songs similar to The Secret of Immortality (不死之謎 Bu Si Zhi Mi) and Superb (出神入化 Chu Shen Ru Hua) are leaning toward the pop rock and rap genre, where they displayed their ability to rap and harmonize well.

Their much anticipated second album, Two-sided Fahrenheit, was released on January 4, 2008. The new album saw the four employ more advanced harmonizing techniques as well as some progression from bubblegum pop to more mature ballads, such as Ten Thousand Joys (一萬個快樂 Yi Wan Ge Kuai Le). Nonetheless, the band's youthful energy was retained in songs such as the opening song for the drama Romantic Princess, New Home (新窝 Xin Wo), which is a duet by Fahrenheit and their seniors S.H.E. On the album Little VIP (小小大人物 Xiao Xiao Da Ren Wu) is the Disney theme song for 2008.

Often criticized for the lack of character in their music, Fahrenheit finally moved towards carving a more distinct musical style with their third album, Love You More & More (越來越愛 Yue Lai Yue Ai) which features a new maturity that is brought out by rock ballads like the main track, Lonesome Sprint (寂寞暴走 Ji Mo Bao Zou) and Stay With Me (留下來 Liu Xia Lai)， of which the latter was written by Monster, the lead guitarist of popular Taiwanese band, Mayday. The album also features Artery (動脈 Dong Mai), theme song of Mysterious Incredible Terminator (霹靂MIT), Shining Star (恒星 Heng Xing), theme song of Rolling Love (翻滾吧！蛋炒飯) and the ending song of drama ToGetHer (愛就宅一起) featuring Jiro and Rainie Yang, The Love of Silence (默默 Mo Mo). The album is completed by slower ballads that showcases the quartet's improved vocals and chemistry in harmonization.

After 20 months from the third album, Fahrenheit's fourth album, Super Hot (太热 Tai Re) was released on September 17, 2010. This album's musical style is dance and has tracks such as Super Hot (太热 Tai Re) and Sexy Girl. Guardian Star (守护星 Shou Hu Xing) is dedicated to all their fans for supporting them for 5 years and also the opening-theme for the drama Love Buffet . Cherish Your Heartache (心疼你的心疼 Xin Teng Ni De Xin Teng) is a slow ballad. Going On My Way (活得更像我 Huo De Geng Xiang Wo) is a combination of two Taiwanese Hokkien songs (收酒矸) and (酒矸倘卖无) in a rock style. Their fourth album also features Very Quiet (很安静 Hen An Jing), the ending-theme of drama Momo Love (桃花小妹), Mistake (误会 Wu Hui) the ending-theme of the drama Love Buffet (爱似百汇) and Rebirth (新生 Xin Sheng) the opening-theme for the manga BLEACH (死神).

== Discography ==
- Fahrenheit (2006)
- Two-Sided Fahrenheit (2008)
- Love You More and More (2009)
- Super Hot (2010)

== Film career ==
Similar to their seniors F4, each member of Fahrenheit has first gained recognition in participating in certain idol dramas.

Jiro Wang was the first discovered among the four, appearing as a small character in The Pawnshop No. 8 and a supporting role in It Started with a Kiss as Ah Jin. Closely tracing his popularity that It Started with a Kiss has given him, his company decided to give him the lead role for KO One as well as Calvin Chen and Aaron Yan for they were discovered around that same time. After KO One aired, HIM International Music decided that it was time for Fahrenheit to release their first studio album to fulfill fans' requests. Wang and Yan reprised their roles in It Started with a Kiss's sequel, They Kiss Again.

Wu Chun, however, was heading towards a different road. The last to join Fahrenheit, Wu starred in a separate drama with Ariel Lin, a manga-based drama titled Tokyo Juliet. Following the success Tokyo Juliet has brought him, he was soon chosen to star in Hanazakarino Kimitachihe (Hana-Kimi) along with fellow band member Jiro Wang and S.H.E member Ella. Wu also guest starred in KO One, but had a very short appearance. Wu also stars in the drama Romantic Princess, alongside Calvin Chen.

Hana-Kimi's pilot episode started off strong, posting a rating of 3.05 Until the premiere of Show Lo and Barbie Xu's Corner With Love, Hana-Kimi was the ratings king in its time slot. Barbie Xu bet that Corner With Love's first episode would reach a ratings zenith of 2.9; however, she was off by quite a bit, as Corner wound up with a mere 2.81, peaking at around 3.25. Corner With Love proved to be no match for Hana-Kimi in subsequent episodes, as the latter drama's ratings broke 5.0 by its twelfth episode. Ratings-wise, Hana-Kimi was dominant for each of its 15 episodes, ending off with a finale that averaged around 5.98. In light of Hana-Kimi's success, reports claimed that Selina and Wu would be acting in the sequel to It Started with a Kiss as a couple. However, the director of the sequel stepped out and debunked the rumor.

In a report at Liberty Times, it was confirmed that Wu would be starring in a new manga-based drama alongside Angela Chang. Calvin would also slated to take part as the second male lead in the drama. Filming for this drama, eventually confirmed to be Romantic Princess (公主小妹), began in early May. Romantic Princess has since premiered in Taiwan with a rating of 3.33 for its pilot episode. It was broadcast weekly and ended its run after 13 episodes. Its ratings remain constantly in the 3-4 range, edging out its main competitors, Sweet Relationship starring Vic Zhou and Bull Fighting starring Mike He and Hebe Tian.

The other members of Fahrenheit were also busy with their own filming commitments. Following the success of KO One is its sequel, The X-Family (終極一家). Jiro, Aaron and Calvin reprised their roles as Da Dong, Xiao Yu and Ya Se Wang respectively whilst taking on new roles in this new drama set in a separate dimension. Wu guest-starred and only appeared in the last two episodes of the 55-episode long drama. Shooting for The X-Family started in June 2006, and ended in April 2007. The drama has since enjoyed a full run on GTV, showing every Monday to Friday, and has recently concluded. Its popularity led to a slew of follow ups, including an online game as well as an original soundtrack that was promoted in numerous Asian countries.

Idol dramas aside, it was also reported in various Chinese sources that Wu will be starring in a new Hong Kong-based film with Gillian Chung of Twins. Another report claimed that Wu is currently preparing for a new drama directed by actor/director Stephen Chow. On April 27, 2007, the media announced that Alex Fong will take Wu's place in the new Hong Kong film, Bathing Beauty (出水芙蓉).

On March 17, 2008, a press conference was held to announce that Wu will be filming a movie, Butterfly Lovers (武俠梁祝) with Charlene Choi, the other half of popular Hong Kong group, Twins.

Jiro Wang has finished filming GTV drama, Rolling Love (翻滾吧！蛋炒飯) and ToGetHer(愛就宅一起) with Rainie Yang and George Hu. After being cast as second male lead for a few of his drama series, the youngest member of Fahrenheit Aaron Yan finally stars as the main lead in the GTV drama Mysterious Incredible Terminator (霹靂MIT). Wu is involved in yet another idol drama, Hot Shot (篮球火), acting alongside established artists, Show Lo and Jerry Yan.

Aaron Yan was initially contracted to star in another upcoming drama, Momo Love, alongside his co star of Mysterious Incredible Terminator, Gui Gui. Aaron and Guigui have received a best on-screen couple award, fans like them together as Guilun. Filming began for the show, but was put on hold due to Fahrenheit's album promotion. The show is scheduled for a 2009 release, but due to Aaron's company only wants him to take part of one drama, his role in Momo Love was given to Jiro Wang and Gui Gui's part was given to actress Cyndi Wang.

Also, three out of four members made a special appearances in the series K.O.3an Guo, a sequel to KO One and The X-Family. In the year of 2010, Aaron has filmed two series: Love Buffet (愛似百匯) with Calvin both as male leads, and Gloomy Salad Days(死神少女) with Serena Fang.

In 2012, Jiro's series Absolute Darling (絕對達令) was released in April. A month later, Aaron's series Alice in Wonder City (給愛麗絲的奇蹟) was released. Calvin starred in When Love Walked In (愛情闖進門) and was released in August.

== Publications ==
- February 14, 2007: Fahrenheit Photo Notebook (酷愛飛輪海 / 寫真手札)
- June 20, 2007: Fahrenheit: First Photo Album (飛輪海寫真集: 海角一樂園)
- November 16, 2007: Fahrenheit First (飛輪海寫真集: Fahrenheit First) - Japan Limited
- September 4, 2009: The Beginning, Fahrenheit (飛輪海:原点)

== Endorsements ==
- 2006-now: Master Kang's 3+2 Crackers (PRC)
- 2006: Heme: Man Simple (Taiwan)
- 2006: Honey-Fruit and Vegetable Juice (Taiwan)
- 2007: OraLabs Ouboshi SPF15 Vanilla Flavored Chapstick (Taiwan)
- 2007: 7-11 - with S.H.E (Taiwan)
- 2007-2008: C.C.Lemon (Taiwan)
- 2007: Cadanro (PRC)
- 2007: Taisun Freeze (Taiwan)
- 2007-2008: Taisun Xian Cao Mi (PRC)
- 2007-2008: Ai Lian Jin Shi (Taiwan)
- 2007-2008: Hong Kong Disneyland: Mickey's Summer Blast (Hongkong)
- 2007: Watsons Water (Hongkong)
- 2007: Watsons Water (PRC)
- 2008-now: Mengniu Yogurt - with S.H.E (PRC)
- 2008-now: Canon (Malaysia)
- 2008: Gatsby (PRC)
- 2008-now: Taiwan Tourism Bureau
- 2009-now: ALT Clothing Line (PRC)
- 2009-now: Yeli Clothing Line (PRC)
- 2009-now: Coca-Cola (PRC)
- 2011: Eastern Camel Clothing Line (PRC)
- 2011: Universal Dinosaur Town (PRC)

== Other media ==
On December 6, 2010, HIM International Music released a Fahrenheit themed iPhone game application. The app features tap games of 3 songs in Fahrenheit's latest album, Super Hot.

== Controversies ==
=== Aaron Yan's injury ===
In the later months of 2006 when the quartet were busy preparing for their debut album, the youngest member, Aaron Yan, tore a ligament in the knee while filming a dancing shoot for their music video "I Have My Youth," also known as "Wo You Wo De Young" (我有我的YOUNG). Aaron had to be brought to the hospital for surgery. He was hospitalized for well over three weeks. For four months the other three members of Fahrenheit had to attend overseas album promotions and functions without Aaron. The Taiwanese media then composed rumors saying that Aaron was a disadvantage to the group and that he was dragging the group behind, which would cause disbandment. More rumors surfaced saying that HIM was planning to dispose of Aaron so Fahrenheit could become a group of three instead of four, therefore complementing more with the prefabricated trio S.H.E. However, Fahrenheit stepped out and confirmed that Aaron is still in the group despite his inconvenient condition. To prevent more rumors from happening, as soon as Aaron was available he appeared more often in the future promotions with the other members, clearly seen using crutches.

=== Frankie Kao files lawsuit ===
In mid-January when the boy band Fahrenheit were guests on the Chinese program, Super Winners (超级大赢家), fans had filed complaints toward the host, Frankie Kao, for his disrespectful and careless attitude towards Fahrenheit and their fans. Fans listed their arguments, criticizing Kao for being contemptuous; before the program was to be recorded Fahrenheit and their fans had to wait for over two hours because Kao had to practice his dance for the opening; when Aaron Yan accidentally had his eyes burnt by fireworks, Kao completely ignored his injury and continued on with the program. When fans began to worry and cry, he became annoyed and screamed at the fans to shut up. Fans also complained that when Fahrenheit was dancing, Kao had caused them to NG many times and therefore they were required to dance several more times. Fans witnessed an extremely exhausted Jiro Wang, who was almost to the point of collapsing after dancing. The ill Wu Chun was also a victim; fans had witnessed Kao requiring Wu to do health-risking activities when Wu was sick with a fever.

After reports of Kao being disrespectful to newcomers like Fahrenheit had been released, Kao immediately filed a lawsuit against the producer of the program, saying that the producer of the program "did not edit the production fairly" and was "destroying his image." Kao demanded 100 Million Renminbi as compensation for the damage it would cause on his image. However, after the episode of the program was aired, Kao canceled the lawsuit because he was satisfied with the result.

=== Hacked Online Accounts ===
Recently, HIM Comic Productions announced that online accounts of members Aaron, Jiro, Calvin, and Chun have been hacked. It was recently discovered by the company that Wu Chun's Yahoo and Wretch account, Aaron's Wretch account and MSN account, Jiro and Calvin's MSN accounts have been hacked. The company has already sent out a warning and apology to all fans who received receiving offensive or virus-infected mails from any of the Fahrenheit members' accounts. This was already evident in Aaron Yan's last blog post where he mentioned things about privacy and hacked e-mails. Fortunately, the management has already put action into the matter.
