= HIM International Music =

Taiwanese record label established in 1999

- Native name: 華研國際音樂股份有限公司
- Type: Public
- Industry: Music; Entertainment; Production
- Genre: Pop; dance; R&B; hip hop; Mandopop
- Founded: 1999
- Founder: Lu Yan-Qing
- Headquarters: Taipei, Taiwan
- Area served: Taiwan, Mainland China and Hong Kong
- Services: Artist management; Record production; Music distribution; Music publishing
- Website: www.him.com.tw

HIM International Music (Chinese: 華研國際音樂股份有限公司) is a Taiwanese independent record label and artist management company established in 1999. It is an International Federation of the Phonographic Industry (IFPI) member record company.

HIM International Music Company is well known for its many hit songs and the production of some of the most well-known artists in Mandopop. The company is also recognized to be the only music record label in Singapore listed in the stock market.

HIM International Music started off as two different labels, Grand Music and Tiger Music. Grand Music had a number of successful artists; Yuan Wei Jen released his first album under Grand Music, and earned a nomination for Best Mandarin Male Performer at the 12th Golden Melody Awards. A while after the nomination, Yuan put his solo career on hiatus, and master produced albums for HIM International artists until 2004. Power Station joined Grand Music, then in August, they won the Best Group Award at the 14th Golden Melody Awards.

Grand Music held a Universal Talent and Beauty Contest to search for new talent. The finals were televised on China Television's TV Citizen; the winner was Selina Jen. Grand Music eventually selected finalists Ella Chen and Hebe Tien as well, putting the three girls into a group called S.H.E. On October 1, 2000, Grand Music underwent a name change and became known as HIM International Music. On May 16, 2002, Tiger Music became HIM Music Publishing, which, to this day, operates under HIM International Music. In 2010, HIM International Music announced that they will not only be managing record labels but they will also begin managing actors and actresses.

== History ==
- 1999: HIM International Music was founded
- 2004: S.H.E won Best Vocal Group at the 14th Golden Melody Awards
- 2005: Launched the 1st HIM Global Online Songwriting Competition
- 2005 Fahrenheit and Tank debuted, Power Station won Best Vocal Group at the 16th Golden Melody Awards
- 2007 Yoga Lin won Season 1 of One Million Star and officially debuted
- 2010 Hebe Tien’s debut solo album was nominated for Best Mandarin Album at the 22nd Golden Melody Awards
- 2012 Yoga Lin was nominated for Best Mandarin Male Singer at the 23rd Golden Melody Awards
- 2013 HIM was officially listed on the stock exchange
- 2014 Formed a strategic partnership with Cube Entertainment in Korea, Expands into creative IP development, licensing, and management. Work with illustrators such as LAIMO, Song Song Meow, OLOGY
- 2015 A Little Happiness, the theme song of the film Our Times, surpasses 200 million views
- 2019 Strengthened investments in international film and TV music, establishing a strategic partnership with DaMou Entertainment
- 2022 Karencici nominated for Best Mandarin Female Singer & Best Vocal Recording Album at the 33rd Golden Melody Awards
- 2023 Yisa Yu was nominated for Best Mandarin Female Singer at the 34th Golden Melody Awards

== Current artists ==
Soloists

- Yu Chiu-hsin
- Yen Chih-lin
- Yoga Lin
- Yisa Yu
- Pets Tseng
- Yo Lee
- Sihan Geng
- JUD
- Salsa Chen
- 77Ke
- +How
- Kuokang
- LaDY
- Julia Wu

Groups

- Power Station
- babyMINT
- antitalent

Others

- 木木
- Jesseca Liu

== Subsidiaries ==
- All Ears Music Inc.
- HM Music
- Blooming Music & Arts

== Major OST ==
| Year | Drama Title | Song Title |
|---|---|---|
| 2003 | The Rose | |
| 2005 | Reaching for the Stars | |
| 2006 | Hanazakarino Kimitachihe | |
| 2012 | Love | Fool |
| 2015 | Our Times | A Little Happiness |
| 2015 | The Ark of Mr. Chow | Wings of My Words |
| 2018 | Us and Them | Friend That Loved A Long Time |
| 2019 | The World Between Us | Walking by the world |
| 2020 | Your Love Song | Your Love Song |
| 2020 | Workers | A Little Happiness |
| 2020 | The Victims' Game | One Who Will(Find Me) |
| 2024 | Let's Talk About Chu | This is Love |

== See also ==
- List of companies of Taiwan
- List of record labels
