= List of awards and nominations received by S.H.E =

S.H.E awards and nominations
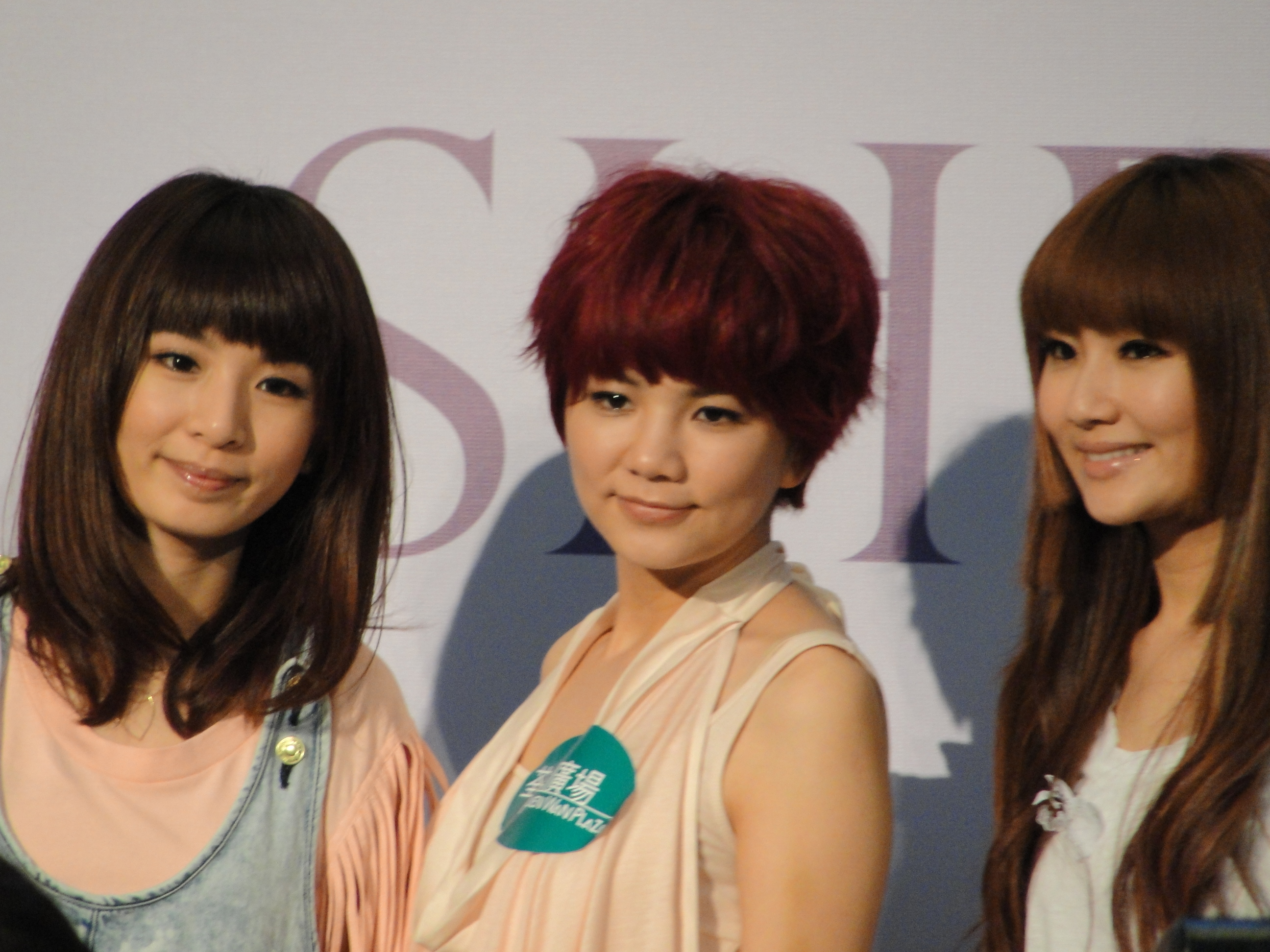
- S.H.E attended the propaganda activity in Tsuen Wan Plaza, Hong Kong in 2010
Award	Won	Nominations
CMA Awards	1	14
Global Chinese Music Awards	10	20
Golden Bell Awards	1	2
Golden Melody Awards	1	7
HITO Radio Music Awards	15	15^{[*]}
IFPI Hong Kong Album Sales Awards	2	2
Malaysian Golden Melody Awards	5	5^{[*]}
Metro Radio Mandarin Music Awards	21	25
Metro Showbiz Hit Awards	6	6^{[*]}
MTV Asia Awards	0	5
RTHK Chinese Gold Song Awards	4	9
Singapore Hit Awards	19	20
Hong Kong TVB8 Awards	9	22
Annual Artiste Awards	1	1^{[*]}
Annual Music Chart Awards	4	6^{[*]}
Canada's Best Chinese Hits Chart	6	6^{[*]}
China Mobile M.Music Wireless Awards	4	4^{[*]}
Chinese Music Radio Awards	2	2^{[*]}
KKBOX Music Chart Awards	7	7^{[*]}
MusicRadio China TOP Charts Awards	4	4^{[*]}
Sina Hong Kong Music Awards	3	3^{[*]}
Southeast Music Chart Awards	3	8
Sprite Music Awards	14	14^{[*]}
- Total
Awards won	140
Nominations	207+
- Footnotes and References

S.H.E, a Taiwanese girl group, has won numerous awards since entering the Mandopop industry. Formed in 2001, the group's members are Selina Ren, Hebe Tien, and Ella Chen. Ren, Tien, and Chen all participated in the 2001 Universal Talent and Beauty Girl Contest, the winner of which would join Power Station on HIM International Music's roster. Although Ren had won the contest, Tien and Chen joined Ren in forming S.H.E. Since their debut in 2001, the trio has recorded eleven albums in six years, and sales have exceeded 4.5 million since the release of their first album Girls' Dorm. S.H.E's third album, Genesis, was recognized with more awards than any other work. In 2003, the album's success culminated in Best Group honours at both the Golden Melody Awards and the Singapore Hit Awards.

The group's most successful songs to date are "Don't Wanna Grow Up" (Once Upon a Time) and "Chinese Language" (Play). Although the latter song drew considerable cross-straits controversy, it won six awards—one of which was Sina Hong Kong's Mandarin Song of the Year—and earned three additional nominations. Between 2006 and 2007, "Don't Wanna Grow Up" also earned six awards. On a year-by-year basis, S.H.E was most successful in 2007, when the group won 32 awards from 44 nominations. Honours received that year include seventeen awards for either Best or Most Popular Group, twelve for song-related categories, one for Best Album, one for Best Soundtrack, and one for Best Music Video. With over 130 awards to S.H.E's credit, the success of the group led to the formation of more Taiwanese pop groups, including i.n.g, Michelle*Vickie, G-Boys, and 7 Flowers.

== CMA Awards ==
Since 1994, the CMA Awards have been given annually by the television network Channel [V]. Awards are split into two regional categories: Mainland China and Hong Kong (HK)/Taiwan. S.H.E has won one award from fourteen nominations.

Year	Award	Work	Result	Ref.
2002	Best New Artist	S.H.E 女朋友 (pinyin: nü péngyǒu)	Nominated	
2002	Top 20 Songs of the Year (HK/Taiwan)	"Fridge" (冰箱)	Nominated	
2003	Best Group (HK/Taiwan)	S.H.E	Nominated	
2003	Best Music Video (HK/Taiwan)	"Remember"	Nominated	
2003	Top 20 Songs of the Year (HK/Taiwan)	"Remember"	Nominated	
2004	Best Group (HK/Taiwan)	S.H.E	Nominated	
2004	Best Music Video (HK/Taiwan)	"Super Star"	Nominated	
2004	Top 20 Songs of the Year (HK/Taiwan)	"Faraway" (遠方)	Nominated	
2005	Best Group (HK/Taiwan)	S.H.E	Nominated	
2005	Top 20 Songs of the Year (HK/Taiwan)	"He Still Doesn't Understand" (他還是不懂)	Nominated	
2005	Top 20 Songs of the Year (HK/Taiwan)	"Persian Cat" (波斯貓)	Nominated	
2006	Best Band (HK/Taiwan)	S.H.E	Nominated	
2006	Top 20 Songs of the Year (HK/Taiwan)	"Star Light" (星光)	Nominated	
2007	Best Group (HK/Taiwan)	S.H.E	Won	

== Global Chinese Music Awards ==
The Global Chinese Music Awards are given annually by a group of seven radio stations: 988 (Malaysia), Beijing Music Radio, Hit FM, Music FM Radio Guangdong, RTHK, Shanghai Radio 101.7 FM, and YES 933. S.H.E has won eight Global Chinese Music Awards. In 2002, three songs—"Message of Blessedness", "Tropical Rainforest" and "Beauty Up My Life"—combined to form S.H.E's nomination for Best New Artist. However, the gold, silver, and bronze awards for the female subdivision of that category went to Twins, Snow Wei, and Peggy Hsu, respectively. In 2003, four songs—"Genesis", "Always on My Mind", "White Love Song", and "Irreplaceable"—collectively formed the group's nomination for Best Group; the trio ultimately shared the Silver Award with Twins in that category. 2003 was, in fact, the last year in which Gold, Silver and Bronze Awards were given in the Best Group category; since then, recipients of the award have been named co-winners. From 2005–2007, Twins and Yu Quan were the only other co-recipients of the Best Group award.

In 2006, Selina won an additional award for her duet with Tank. In 2007, Hebe earned two nominations for her duet with Fahrenheit, but did not win.

Year	Award	Work	Result	Ref.
2002	Best New Artist	S.H.E	Nominated	
2003	Best Group	S.H.E	Silver Award	
2003	Top 20 Songs of the Year	"Genesis" (美麗新世界)	Won^{[NR]}	
2003	Top 20 Songs of the Year	"Always on My Mind"	Nominated	
2004	Best Group	S.H.E	Won	
2005	Best Group	S.H.E	Won	
2005	Top 20 Songs of the Year	"Piquancy" (痛快)	Nominated	
2006	Best Group	S.H.E	Won	
2006	Top 20 Songs of the Year	"Don't Wanna Grow Up" (不想長大)	Won^{[NR]}	
2007	Best Group	S.H.E	Won	
2007	Top 20 Songs of the Year	"Chinese Language" (中國話)	Nominated	
2008	Best Group	S.H.E	Won	

== Golden Melody Awards ==
The Golden Melody Awards (GMA) are awarded annually by the Government Information Office (GIO) of the Republic of China. S.H.E has won one GMA from seven nominations. Nominees for the Best Vocal Collaboration awards are named based on the best album they released that year, as determined by the GIO. In 2007, S.H.E was listed as one of the Most Popular Female Artists in Taiwan, but lost the award to Jolin Tsai.

Year	Number	Award	Nominated work	Result	Ref.
2002	13th	Best New Artist	Girls' Dorm	Nominated	
2003	14th	Best Vocal Collaboration	Genesis	Won	
2004	15th	Best Vocal Collaboration	Super Star	Nominated	
2005	16th	Best Vocal Collaboration	Magical Journey	Nominated	
2006	17th	Best Vocal Collaboration	Once Upon a Time	Nominated	
2007	18th	Most Popular Female Artist	—N/a	Nominated	
2011	22nd	Best Vocal Collaboration	SHERO	Nominated	
2019	30th	Song of the Year	Seventeen (十七)	Nominated	

== HITO Radio Music Awards ==
The HITO Radio Music Awards are given annually by HITO Radio, the parent company of Taiwanese radio station Hit FM. S.H.E has won fifteen of these awards. One of these awards was won in 2008 for contributing to the Hanazakarino Kimitachihe OST. In 2007, Selina won an award for "You are a Song in My Heart", her duet with Leehom Wang.

Year	Award	Work	Result	Ref.
2003	Best Female Group	S.H.E	Won	
2003	Best Chart Performance	S.H.E	Won	
2003	Top 10 Mandarin Songs of the Year	"Tropical Rain Forest" (熱帶雨林)	Won^{[NR]}	
2004	Best Female Group	S.H.E	Won	
2004	Best Chart Performance	S.H.E	Won	
2004	Top 10 Mandarin Songs of the Year	"Super Star"	Won^{[NR]}	
2005	Best Female Group	S.H.E	Won	
2005	Top 10 Mandarin Songs of the Year	"Migratory Bird" (候鳥)	Won^{[NR]}	
2006	Voted Most Popular Group	S.H.E	Won	
2007	Best Female Group	S.H.E	Won	
2007	Voted Most Popular Group	S.H.E	Won	
2007	Top 10 Mandarin Songs of the Year	"Electric Shock" (觸電)	Won^{[NR]}	
2008	Best Female Group	S.H.E	Won	
2008	Top 10 Mandarin Songs of The Year	"May Day" (五月天)	Won^{[NR]}	
2009	Best Female Group	S.H.E	Won	
2009	Top 10 Mandarin Songs of The Year	"Silenced" (安静了)	Won^{[NR]}	
2013	Best Group	S.H.E	Won	
2013	Most Popular Group	S.H.E	Won	
2013	Top 10 Mandarin Songs of The Year	"Blossomy" (花又開好了)	Won^{[NR]}	
2013	Hit Fm Favorite Singer	S.H.E	Won	
2019	Most Popular Digital Single	"Seventeen" (十七)	Nominated	

== IFPI Hong Kong Album Sales Awards ==
The IFPI Hong Kong Album Sales Awards (Chinese: IFPI香港唱片銷量大獎), formerly Gold Record Awards (金唱片頒獎典禮) is presented by the Hong Kong branch of International Federation of the Phonographic Industry (IFPI) since 1977. The order is not specified for the Top 10 Selling Mandarin Albums of the Year (十大銷量國語唱片獲獎).

Year	Category	Nomination	Result	Ref.
2005	Top 10 Selling Mandarin Albums of the Year	Encore	Won	
2008	Top 10 Selling Mandarin Albums of the Year	FM S.H.E	Won	
2012	Top 10 Selling Mandarin Albums of the Year	S.H.E Is the One	Won	
2012	Top 1 Selling Mandarin Albums of the Year	S.H.E Is the One	Won	
2013	Top 10 Selling Mandarin Albums of the Year	Blossomy	Won	
2015	Top 10 Selling Mandarin Albums of the Year	2gether 4ever Concert Live	Won	
2016	Top 10 Selling Mandarin Albums of the Year	2gether 4ever Encore Concert Live	Won	
2017	Top 10 Selling Mandarin Albums of the Year	Irreplaceable	Won	

== Global Chinese Golden Chart Awards ==
The Global Chinese Golden Chart Awards are music awards founded by China National Radio and Hit FM in 2009.

Year	Award	Work	Result	Ref.
2011	Best Group	S.H.E	Won	
2011	Top 20 Songs of the Year	"SHERO"	Won	
2013	Best Group	S.H.E	Won	
2013	Most Popular Group	S.H.E	Won	
2013	Top 20 Songs of the Year	"Blossomy" (花又開好了)	Won	
2017	Top 20 Songs of the Year	"Irreplaceable" (永遠都在)	Won	
2019	Top 20 Songs of the Year	"Seventeen" (十七)	Won	

== Malaysian Golden Melody Awards ==
The Malaysian Golden Melody Awards were given annually by the radio station 988. Ceremonies were held from 2001 to 2003 at the Genting Highlands Resort. S.H.E won five of these awards, including two Gold Awards for Best Group.

Year	Award	Work	Result	Ref.
2002	Best Group	S.H.E	Gold Award	
2002	Top 10 Songs of the Year	"Genesis" (美麗新世界)	Won^{[NR]}	
2003	Best Group	S.H.E	Gold Award	
2003	Best Stage Performance	S.H.E	Silver Award	
2003	Top 10 Songs of the Year	"Always on My Mind"	Won (#3)	

== Metro Radio Mandarin Music Awards ==
The Metro Radio Mandarin Music Awards are given annually by the Hong Kong radio station Metro Info. S.H.E has won nineteen Metro Radio awards. In 2007, Hebe earned a nomination for Best Female Artist, and won an additional award for her duet with boy band Fahrenheit. In 2008, S.H.E shared a Best Duet Song award with Fahrenheit for the song "New Home", the opening theme for Romantic Princess.

Year	Award	Work	Result	Ref.
2004	Asia's Best Group	S.H.E	Won	
2004	Best Mandarin Group	S.H.E	Won	
2004	Top Songs of the Year	"Super Star"	Won (#1)	
2005	Asia's Best Group	S.H.E	Won	
2005	Asia's Best Idol Group	S.H.E	Won	
2005	Top Songs of the Year	"Piquancy" (痛快)	Won^{[NR]}	
2005	Top Songs of the Year	"Just Right" (對號入座)	Won^{[NR]}	
2006	Best Dancing Group	S.H.E	Won	
2006	Best Stage Performance	S.H.E	Won	
2006	Top Songs of the Year	"Super Model"	Won^{[NR]}	
2006	Top Songs of the Year	"Don't Want to Grow Up" (不想長大)	Won^{[NR]}	
2006	Top Songs of the Year	"Star Light" (星光)	Nominated	
2007	Asia's Best Group	S.H.E	Won	
2007	Best Stage Performance	S.H.E	Won	
2007	Top Songs of the Year	"Chinese Language" (中國話)	Won^{[NR]}	
2007	Top Songs of the Year	"May Day" (五月天)	Won^{[NR]}	
2007	Top Songs of the Year	"Ring Ring Ring"	Nominated	
2007	Top Songs of the Year	"What to Do?" (怎麽辦)	Nominated	
2008	Asia's Best Group	S.H.E	Won	
2008	Asia's Most Popular Group	S.H.E	Won	
2008	Asia's Best Idol	S.H.E	Won	
2008	Top Songs of the Year	"Listen to Yuan Wei-jen Play Guitar" (聽袁淮仁彈吉他)	Won^{[NR]}	

== Metro Radio Hit Awards ==
The Metro Radio Hit Awards (新城勁爆頒獎禮), like the Metro Radio Mandarin Music Awards, are given annually (usually in December) by Hong Kong radio station Metro Info. In contrast to the Mandarin Music Awards, the Hit Awards focuses on Cantopop music, and provide a few honours for Mandarin-language music. S.H.E has won six of these awards.

Year	Award	Work	Result	Ref.
2007	Nation's Best Group (as voted by fans)	S.H.E	Won	
2007	Best Mandarin Song	"Chinese Language" (中國話)	Won	
2008	Best Mandarin Album	FM S.H.E	Won	
2008	Nation's Best Group (as voted by fans)	S.H.E	Won	
2008	Nation's Best Mandarin Group (as voted by fans)	S.H.E	Won	
2008	Asia's Best Dance Group (as voted by fans)	S.H.E	Won	

== MTV Asia Awards ==
Since 2002, the MTV Asia Awards have been held every year except 2007. The 2005 edition of the ceremonies paid tribute to the victims of the 2004 Tsunami. S.H.E has received five nominations for being Taiwan's Favourite Artist.

Year	Award	Work	Result	Ref.
2003	Favourite Artist Taiwan	S.H.E	Nominated	
2004	Favourite Artist Taiwan	S.H.E	Nominated	
2005	Favourite Artist Taiwan	S.H.E	Nominated	
2006	Favourite Artist Taiwan	S.H.E	Nominated	
2008	Favourite Artist Taiwan	S.H.E	Nominated	

== RTHK Chinese Gold Song Awards ==
The RTHK Chinese Gold Song Awards are given annually by Radio and Television Hong Kong. Ceremonies are held once a year between late December to early January, and honour works produced in the previous year. An exception to this rule occurred in 2003, when the 25th and 26th editions of the awards show were both held in the same year. The 25th iteration, held in January 2003, served as the 2002 edition; the 26th iteration, held in December 2003, served as the 2003 edition. As a result, the 27th iteration (2004 edition) was pushed to January 2005. S.H.E has won four awards from nine nominations.

Year	Award	Work	Result	Ref.
2003	Most Popular Group	S.H.E	Nominated	
2003	Most Popular Group	S.H.E	Silver Award	
2003	Best Mandarin Song	"Super Star"	Nominated	
2005	Most Popular Group	S.H.E	Bronze Award	
2005	Best Mandarin Song	"Persian Cat" (波斯貓)	Nominated	
2006	Most Popular Group	S.H.E	Bronze Award	
2008	Nation's Best Group	S.H.E	Nominated	
2008	Best Mandarin Song	"What to Do?" (怎麽辦)	Nominated	
2008	Best Mandarin Song	"Chinese Language" (中國話)	Nominated	
2009	Nation's Best Group	S.H.E	Won	

== Singapore Hit Awards ==
The Singapore Hit Awards are given annually by the radio station YES 933. S.H.E, who won fourteen of these awards, has been honoured every year except 2005 and 2006. Performers earn nominations (except for songs) based on the album(s) they released that particular year. Between the 2003 and 2004 Singapore Hit Awards, S.H.E released two albums, which is why both were included in the trio's 2004 Best Group nomination. From 2003 to 2004, six songs—"He Still Doesn't Understand", "Super Star", "Persian Cat", "Faraway", "The Flowers Have Blossomed", and "When the Angels Sing"—stayed on the YES 933 charts for a combined 76 weeks;^{[a]} this achievement earned the group a Best Chart Performance award at the 2004 Singapore Hit Awards. In 2007, S.H.E and Stefanie Sun were both honoured with the Asia Media Award.

Year	Award	Work	Result	Ref.
2002	Best New Artist	S.H.E	Won	
2002	M1 Liveliest New Artist	S.H.E	Won	
2003	Best Group	Genesis	Won	
2004	Most Popular Group	S.H.E	Won	
2004	Courts My Favourite Music Video	"Persian Cat" (波斯貓)	Won	
2004	Best Chart Performance	"He Still Doesn't Understand" (他還是不懂)	Won	
2004	Best Chart Performance	"Super Star"	Won	
2004	Best Chart Performance	"Persian Cat" (波斯貓)	Won	
2004	Best Chart Performance	"Faraway" (遠方)	Won	
2004	Best Chart Performance	"The Flowers Have Blossomed" (花都開好了)	Won	
2004	Best Chart Performance	"When the Angels Sing" (天使在唱歌)	Won	
2004	Top 10 Songs of the Year	"Super Star"	Won^{[NR]}	
2004	Top 10 Songs of the Year	"He Still Doesn't Understand" (他還是不懂)	Won^{[NR]}	
2004	Best Group	Super Star	Nominated	
2004	Best Group	Magical Journey	Nominated	
2004	Regional Most Popular Artist (Taiwan)	S.H.E	Nominated	
2005	Best Group	Encore	Nominated	
2007	Best Group	Play	Won	
2007	Most Popular Group	S.H.E	Won	
2007	Taiwan's Most Popular Artist	S.H.E	Won	
2007	Best Chart Performance	S.H.E	Won	
2007	Asia Media Award	S.H.E	Won	
2007	Top 10 Songs of the Year	"What to Do?" (怎麼辦)	Won^{[NR]}	
2007	Album of the Year	Play	Nominated	
2008	Most Popular Group	S.H.E	Won	
2009	Best Group	FM S.H.E	Won	
2009	Asia Media Award (Group/Band)	S.H.E	Won	
2009	Regional Most Popular Artist (Taiwan)	S.H.E	Won	
2010	Best Group	SHERO	Won	
2010	Asia Media Award (Group/Band)	S.H.E	Won	
2010	Best Chart Performance	S.H.E	Won	
2010	Most Popular Group/Band	S.H.E	Won	
2013	Best Group	Blossomy	Won	
2013	Top 10 Songs of the Year	Blossomy	Won	

== Hong Kong TVB8 Awards ==
The Hong Kong TVB8 Awards are given annually by TVB8, a Mandarin television network operated by Television Broadcasts Limited. S.H.E has won nine of these awards. In 2005, Vincent Fang earned a nomination for his lyrics in "Migratory Bird", the lead single for Encore.

Year	Award	Work	Result	Ref.
2002	Best Group	S.H.E	Silver Award	
2002	Best Music Video	"Remember"	Bronze Award	
2003	Best Group	S.H.E	Gold Award	
2003	Top 15 Songs of the Year	"Super Star"	Won (#2)	
2004	Best Group	S.H.E	Gold Award	
2004	Top 10 Songs of the Year	"Persian Cat" (波斯貓)	Won (#2)	
2005	Best Group	S.H.E	Nominated	
2005	Best Lyrics	"Migratory Bird" (候鳥)	Nominated	
2005	Best Lyrics	"Star Light" (星光)	Nominated	
2005	Top 10 Songs of the Year	"Migratory Bird" (候鳥)	Nominated	
2005	Top 10 Songs of the Year	"Star Light" (星光)	Nominated	
2006	Best Group	S.H.E	Gold Award	
2006	Song of the Year	"Don't Want to Grow Up" (不想長大)	Won	
2006	Top 10 Songs of the Year	"Don't Want to Grow Up" (不想長大)	Won (#1)	
2006	Top 10 Songs of the Year	"Ring Ring Ring"	Nominated	
2006	Top 10 Songs of the Year	"Super Model"	Nominated	
2006	Top 10 Songs of the Year	"What Happened to Us?" (我們怎麽了)	Nominated	
2007	Top 10 Songs of the Year	"Chinese Language" (中國話)	Nominated	
2007	Top 10 Songs of the Year	"May Day" (五月天)	Nominated	
2007	Top 10 Songs of the Year	"What to Do?" (怎麽辦)	Nominated	

== Annual Music Chart Awards ==
The Annual Music Chart Awards hand out awards for Cantopop and Mandopop artists in Greater China. The ceremony has been sponsored by numerous companies over the years—Cici (2001), Pepsi (2002–2006), and Mengniu (2007). S.H.E has won four of these awards.

Year	Award	Work	Result	Ref.
2003	Best Group	S.H.E	Won	
2005	Top 10 Songs of the Year (HK/Taiwan)	"Persian Cat" (波斯貓)	Won (#8)	
2007	Most Popular Female Artist	S.H.E	Won	
2008	Best Group	S.H.E	Won	
2009	Best Group	FM S.H.E	Nominated	
2009	Best Music Video	"Miss Universe" (宇宙小姐)	Nominated	

== Canada's Best Chinese Hits Chart ==
Canada's Best Chinese Hits Chart is a set of awards handed out annually by Fairchild Radio. The awards honour work produced in the previous year. S.H.E has won six of these awards. In 2008, Selina won an additional award for her duet with Leehom Wang.

Year	Award	Work	Result	Ref.
2004	Best Mandarin Group	S.H.E	Won	
2007	Best Mandarin Group (Mandarin)	S.H.E	Won	
2008	Best Mandarin Group	S.H.E	Won	
2008	Top 10 Mandarin Songs of the Year	"Chinese Language" (中國話)	Won^{[NR]}	
2009	Top 10 Mandarin Songs of the Year	"It's Quiet Now" (安静了)	Won	
2011	Best Mandarin Group	S.H.E	Won	
2011	Top 10 Mandarin Songs of the Year	"Loving You" (愛上你)	Won	
2013	Best Mandarin Group	S.H.E	Won	
2013	Top 10 Mandarin Songs of the Year	"Blossomy" (花又開好了)	Won	

== KKBOX Music Awards ==
The KKBOX Music Awards are given annually by the Taiwanese online music store KKBOX, and recognize works produced in the previous calendar year. Thus, an awards show taking place in 2005 would be labelled "The 2004 KKBOX Music Awards" to recognize work produced in 2004. S.H.E has won four of these awards. Two other awards were credited to the trio's contributions to soundtracks. Hebe won an award in 2007 for her duet with Fahrenheit.

Year	Award	Work	Result	Ref.
2006	Top 10 Artists of the Year	S.H.E	Won^{[NR]}	
2007	Best Group	S.H.E	Won	
2007	Top 20 Songs of the Year	"Electric Shock" (觸電)	Won^{[NR]}	
2008	Top 10 Artists of the Year	S.H.E	Won^{[NR]}	
2011	Top 10 Artists of the Year	S.H.E	Won	

== Sprite Music Awards ==
The Sprite Music Awards are given annually by Sprite China to honour the best in the music industry for the previous calendar year; an awards show taking place in 2005 would be labelled "The 2004 Sprite Music Awards" to recognize work produced in 2004. S.H.E has won 13 of these awards. Hebe won an additional award in 2007 for her duet with Fahrenheit.

Year	Award	Work	Result	Ref.
2005	Asia's Best Group	S.H.E	Won	
2005	Top 10 Songs of the Year	"Persian Cat" (波斯貓)	Won^{[NR]}	
2006	Asia's Best Group	S.H.E	Won	
2006	Best Stage Performance	S.H.E	Won	
2006	Best Music Video	"Star Light" (星光)	Won	
2006	Top Songs of the Year	"Star Light" (星光)	Won (#5)	
2007	Asia's Best Group	S.H.E	Won	
2007	Taiwan's Best Album	Once Upon a Time	Won	
2007	Top Songs of the Year	"Don't Want to Grow Up" (不想長大)	Won (#5)	
2008	Asia's Best Group	S.H.E	Won	
2008	Nation's Most Respected Song	"Chinese Language" (中國話)	Won	
2008	Best Stage Performance	S.H.E	Won	
2008	Top 10 Songs of the Year	"Listen to Yuan Wei-jen Play Guitar" (聽袁惟仁彈吉他)	Won (#5)	

== Individual and shared honours ==
=== As individuals or featured artists ===
==== Selina ====
Selina has won three awards, all of which have come from duets with other artists. In 2006, "Solo Madrigal" (獨唱情歌), her duet with Tank, was named Best Duet Song at the 6th Global Chinese Music Awards. Two years later, she earned four awards for her duet with Leehom Wang.

Year	Event	Award	Work	Result	Ref.
2006	Global Chinese Music Awards	Best Duet Song	"Solo Madrigal"	Won	
2008	HITO Radio Music Awards	Top 10 Songs Of The Year	"You Are a Song in My Heart"	Won^{[NR]}	
2008	Canada's Best Chinese Hits Chart	Top 10 Songs of the Year	"You Are a Song in My Heart"	Won^{[NR]}	
2008	Global Chinese Music Awards	Best Duet Song	"You Are a Song in My Heart"	Won	
2008	Global Chinese Music Awards	Top 20 Songs of the Year	"You Are a Song in My Heart"	Nominated	
2008	China Mobile Wireless Music Awards	Best Duet Song	"You Are a Song in My Heart"	Won	

==== Hebe ====
Hebe has earned three awards from six nominations, all of which have come from being a featured artist on Fahrenheit's song "Only Have Feelings for You" (只對你有感覺). At the 7th Global Chinese Music Awards, Hebe became the first S.H.E member to earn a nomination for Best Female Artist.

Year	Event	Award	Work	Result	Ref.
2007	Sprite Music Awards	Best Duet Song (Taiwan)	"Only Have Feelings for You"	Won	
2007	Global Chinese Music Awards	Top 20 Songs of the Year	"Only Have Feelings for You"	Nominated	
2007	Global Chinese Music Awards	Best Female Artist	"Only Have Feelings for You"	Nominated	
2007	KKBOX Awards	Top 20 Songs of the Year	"Only Have Feelings for You"	Won^{[NR]}	
2007	Metro Radio Mandarin Music Awards	Most Popular Karaoke Songs	"Only Have Feelings for You"	Won	
2007	Metro Radio Mandarin Music Awards	Top Songs of the Year	"Only Have Feelings for You"	Nominated	
2011	22nd Golden Melody Awards	Best Mandarin Album	To Hebe	Nominated	
2011	Singapore Entertainment Awards	Best Album & female singer		Won	
2016	KKBOX Music Awards	Top 10 Artists of the Year	Hebe Tien	Won	
2021	32nd Golden Melody Awards	Best Mandarin Female Singer	Time Will Tell	Won	

==== Ella ====
Ella is the first S.H.E member to be nominated for an acting award. In 2006, her performance as Ren Jie in Reaching for the Stars put her in contention for the Best Actress Award (Movie or Drama); Yang Li-yin ultimately won for her role in Cao Shan Chun Hui (草山春暉). Despite the loss, Ella was voted Best Dressed at the 41st Golden Bell Awards.

Year	Event	Award	Work	Result	Ref.
2006	Golden Bell Awards	Voted Best Dressed		Won	
2006	Golden Bell Awards	Best Actress (Movie or Drama)	Reaching for the Stars	Nominated	
2011	Singapore Entertainment Awards	Best Taiwan Actress		Won	

=== Shared ===
S.H.E has earned six awards from eleven nominations in collaboration with various artists; three of these awards have come from soundtracks produced by HIM International Music. Nominated six times, S.H.E's duets with Fahrenheit have earned three awards, all of which were credited to "New Home". "Thanks for Your Gentleness" earned a nomination for Best Duet Song at the 7th Global Chinese Music Awards.

Year	Event	Award	Work	Result	Ref.
2006	KKBOX Awards	Best Soundtrack	Reaching For The Stars OST	Won	
2007	KKBOX Awards	Best Soundtrack	Hanazakarino Kimitachihe OST	Won	
2007	Global Chinese Music Awards	Best Duet Song	"Thanks for Your Gentleness" (謝謝你的溫柔)	Nominated	
2008	Global Chinese Music Awards	Best Duet Song	"Thanks for Your Gentleness" (謝謝你的溫柔)	Nominated	
2008	Global Chinese Music Awards	Best Duet Song	"New Home" (新窩)	Nominated	
2008	Metro Radio Mandarin Music Awards	Best Duet Song	"New Home" (新窩)	Won	
2008	Singapore Hit Awards	Most Popular Duet Song	"New Home" (新窩)	Won	
2008	Singapore Hit Awards	Top 10 Songs of the Year	"New Home" (新窩)	Won^{[NR]}	
2008	Hong Kong TVB8 Awards	Best Duet Song	"New Home" (新窩)	Nominated	
2008	Hong Kong TVB8 Awards	Top 10 Songs of the Year	"New Home" (新窩)	Nominated	
2008	HITO Radio Music Awards	Best Drama Soundtrack	Hanazakarino Kimitachihe OST	Won	

== Other awards ==
S.H.E has been honoured as the year's best or most popular pop group ten additional times. Among these, three recognized them as the best group in Hong Kong and Taiwan. In 2006, the trio collected an additional bronze award in the Best Group category. S.H.E's songs have received five additional honours. "Persian Cat" and "Don't Wanna Grow Up" were among the top 10 songs of the year in 2004 and 2007, respectively. In 2008, "Chinese Language" received an award for Best Music Video, and was Sina Hong Kong's Mandarin song of the year. Later that year, S.H.E received a sales award for their songs, which were downloaded more than those of any other group in 2008.

Year	Event	Award	Work	Result	Ref.
2003	Chinese Music Radio Awards	Best Group (HK/Taiwan)	S.H.E	Won	
2004	Southeast Music Chart Awards	Best Group (HK/Taiwan)	S.H.E	Won	
2004	Southeast Music Chart Awards	Top 10 Songs of the Year (HK/Taiwan)	"Persian Cat" (波斯貓)	Won^{[NR]}	
2005	Chinese Music Radio Awards	Best Group (HK/Taiwan)	S.H.E	Won	
2005	Southeast Music Chart Awards	Best Idol Group	S.H.E	Nominated	
2006	The Annual Artiste Awards	Best Group	S.H.E	Bronze Award	
2006	Southeast Music Chart Awards	Best Group (HK/Taiwan)	S.H.E	Nominated	
2007	China Mobile M.Music Wireless Awards	Top 10 Songs of the Year	"Don't Wanna Grow Up" (不想長大)	Won^{[NR]}	
2007	SINA Hong Kong Music Awards	Nation's Most Popular Group	S.H.E	Won	
2007	Southeast Music Chart Awards	Best Music Video	"Chinese Language" (中國話)	Won^{[NR]}	
2007	Southeast Music Chart Awards	Best Group	S.H.E	Nominated	
2007	Southeast Music Chart Awards	Album of the Year	Play	Nominated	
2008	Music Radio China Top Chart Awards	Best Group (HK/Taiwan)	Play	Won	
2008	Music Radio China Top Chart Awards	Most Popular Group (HK/Taiwan)	Play	Won	
2008	Music Radio China Top Chart Awards	Top Songs of the Year (HK/Taiwan)	"Chinese Language" (中國話)	Won^{[NR]}	
2008	SINA Hong Kong Music Awards	Best Group	S.H.E	Won	
2008	SINA Hong Kong Music Awards	Best Mandarin Song	"Chinese Language" (中國話)	Won	
2008	China Mobile Wireless Music Awards	Most Popular Group	S.H.E	Won	
2008	China Mobile Wireless Music Awards	Most Downloaded Group	S.H.E	Won	
2008	Southeast Music Chart Awards	Most Popular Group	S.H.E	Nominated	
2009	Music Radio China Top Chart Awards	Best Group (HK/Taiwan)	S.H.E	Won	

== Footnotes ==
- The years in the table indicate the year in which the awards show took place. If the 2004 edition of an awards show takes place in 2005, the table will indicate the latter year.
- In the infobox, award names are shown in dark blue if they have been organized more than twice by either a government body or an Asia-based media company. All other awards are shown in light blue.

^{a} ^{b} ^{c} ^{d} ^{e} ^{f} ^{g} ^{h} ^{i} ^{j} ^{k} ^{l} ^{m} ^{n} ^{o} ^{p} ^{q} ^{r} ^{s} ^{t} ^{u} ^{v} ^{w} ^{x} ^{y} ^{z} ^{aa} ^{ab} ^{ac} ^{ad} Although S.H.E won this award for singing one of the year's top songs or being one of the year's top artists, no specific ranking is ever mentioned.

^{a} ^{b} ^{c} ^{d} ^{e} ^{f} ^{g} ^{h} ^{i} ^{j} ^{k} ^{l} ^{m} ^{n} From the first year this award was given out until 2008, some or all nomination lists are not disclosed. If an awards ceremony had been held before 2001, only nomination lists from 2001 onward will be looked at. If no post-2001 nominations lists can be found for these pre-2001 ceremonies, an asterisk is placed next to the number of nominations for the relevant awards.

"He Still Doesn't Understand" charted for 17 weeks from March 7, 2004 to June 27, 2004. "Persian Cat" charted for 14 weeks from February 8, 2004 to May 9, 2004. "Super Star" charted for 14 weeks from August 31, 2003 to November 30, 2003. "Faraway" charted for 10 weeks from September 28, 2003 to November 30, 2003. "The Flowers have Blossomed" charted for 10 weeks from July 13, 2003 to September 14, 2003. "When the Angels Sing" charted for 11 weeks from May 18, 2003 to July 27, 2003.
