= List of S.H.E live performances =

S.H.E live performances
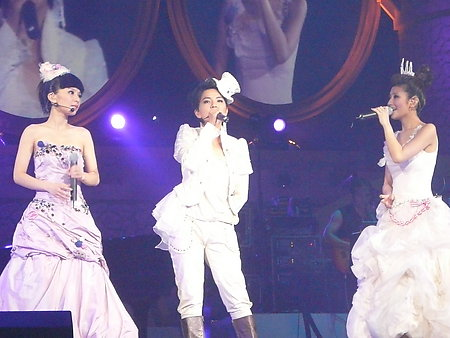
- S.H.E performing at the Hong Kong Coliseum in July 2006
- Concert tours: 4
- Standalone concerts: 11
- One-off concerts: 11

Taiwanese girl group S.H.E has embarked on four concert tours and other concerts since their debut in 2001.

== Concert tours ==
Title	Date	Associated album(s)	Continent(s)	Shows	Gross	Attendance	Ref.
Fantasy Land World Tour	September 4, 2004 – January 7, 2006	Magical Journey	Asia; North America	9	—	240,000	
Perfect 3 World Tour	July 8, 2006 – June 20, 2009	Once Upon a Time	Asia	12	—	369,000	
S.H.E is the One World Tour	October 16, 2009 – September 17, 2010	Map of Love	Asia; Oceania	12	—	172,000	
2gether 4ever World Tour	June 22, 2013 – August 23, 2014	Blossomy	Asia	22	NT$660 million	259,000	

== One-off concerts ==
Event name	Date	City	Country	Special guests	Venue
N-Age Genesis Concert	August 24, 2002	Tainan	Taiwan	Z-Chen	Tainan City Government Square
Play Concert	June 3, 2007	New Taipei City	Taiwan	—	Tamsui Fisherman's Wharf
Play Fun Party Concert	July 28, 2007	Singapore		—	Singapore Expo
S.H.E Jakarta Concert	August 1, 2008	Jakarta	Indonesia	—	Sands Hotel
Top Girl FM S.H.E Concert	October 19, 2008	Taipei	Taiwan	Deserts Chang; Judy Chou	National Taiwan Normal University Stadium
VIP Supreme Stage in Singapore	March 2, 2013	Singapore		—	Resorts World Sentosa
Galaxy Macau Concert	September 20, 2014	Macau	China	—	Galaxy Macau
Super Hot Encore "Don't Wanna Say Goodbye" Concert	June 20, 2015	Genting Highlands	Malaysia	—	Arena of Stars
Super Hot Encore "Don't Wanna Say Goodbye" Concert	June 21, 2015	Genting Highlands	Malaysia	—	Arena of Stars
"Never Say Goodbye" Concert	March 26, 2016	Macau	China	—	Studio City
S.H.E 17th Anniversary Concert	September 11, 2018	Taipei	Taiwan	—	Liberty Square

== Co-organized concerts ==
Date	Concert Name	Location	Venue
September 30, 2008	S.H.E & Fahrenheit "I Led My Dreams" China Tour Concert (S.H.E&飛輪海 "夢想我做主"中國巡迴演唱會)	Inner Mongolia, China	Hohhot City Stadium
October 11, 2008	S.H.E & Fahrenheit "I Led My Dreams" China Tour Concert (S.H.E&飛輪海 "夢想我做主"中國巡迴演唱會)	Hangzhou, China	Yellow Dragon Sports Center
October 24, 2008	S.H.E & Fahrenheit "I Led My Dreams" China Tour Concert (S.H.E&飛輪海 "夢想我做主"中國巡迴演唱會)	Taiyuan, China	Shanxi Provincial Stadium
October 26, 2008	S.H.E & Fahrenheit "I Led My Dreams" China Tour Concert (S.H.E&飛輪海 "夢想我做主"中國巡迴演唱會)	Fuzhou, China	Fuzhou Stadium
October 31, 2008	S.H.E & Fahrenheit "I Led My Dreams" China Tour Concert (S.H.E&飛輪海 "夢想我做主"中國巡迴演唱會)	Jinan, China	Shandong Provincial Stadium
November 2, 2008	S.H.E & Fahrenheit "I Led My Dreams" China Tour Concert (S.H.E&飛輪海 "夢想我做主"中國巡迴演唱會)	Guangdong, China	Shenzhen Stadium
June 20, 2010	S.H.E & Gary Chaw U.S.-Canada Tour Concert (S.H.E&曹格 美加巡迴演唱會)	Connecticut, U.S.	Mohegan Sun Arena
May 1, 2015	S.H.E & Aaron Yan "Forever Star" Concert (S.H.E&炎亞綸 "Forever Star" 演唱會)	Melbourne, Australia	Melbourne Convention and Exhibition Centre
May 3, 2015	S.H.E & Aaron Yan "Forever Star" Concert (S.H.E&炎亞綸 "Forever Star" 演唱會)	Sydney, Australia	Sydney Entertainment Centre
November 10, 2015	S.H.E & Aaron Yan "Forever Star" Concert (S.H.E&炎亞綸 "Forever Star" 演唱會)	Singapore	Singapore Indoor Stadium
