= Forever (S.H.E album) =

Forever (New Song + Collection)
- Forever (New Song + Collection) cover

Compilation album Forever 新歌+精選 by S.H.E
- Released: 21 July 2006
- Recorded: 2003–2006
- Genre: Mandopop
- Length: 72:38
- Language: Mandarin
- Label: HIM International Music
- Producer: Bing Wang (王治平)

S.H.E chronology
Once Upon a Time (2005)	Forever (New Song + Collection) (2006)	Play (2007)

Forever (New Song + Collection) (Chinese: Forever 新歌+精選) is Taiwanese Mandopop girl group S.H.E's second compilation album and 9th album overall. It was released on 21 July 2006 by HIM International Music.

It features songs from their fourth album Super Star in 2003 to seventh album Once Upon a Time in 2005. The previous compilation album, Together, included songs from 2001 to 2003. This album features five new songs, 13 previously released tracks, and a DVD featuring seven music videos. The music video for "觸電" (Electric Shock) features Taiwanese actor Joseph Chang.

== Reception ==
The tracks "Ring Ring Ring" and "我們怎麼了" (What Happened to Us) were nominated for Top 10 Gold Songs at the Hong Kong TVB8 Awards, presented by television station TVB8, in 2006.

The track, "觸電" (Electric Shock), composed by Jay Chou, won one of the Top 10 Songs of the Year at the 2007 HITO Radio Music Awards presented by Taiwanese radio station Hit FM.

The album is the ninth best selling album in Taiwan with 69,000 copies sold in 2006.

== Track listing ==
New tracks are in bold

No.	Title	Lyrics	Music	Notes	Length
1.	"**Electric Shock**" (觸電; Chu Dian)	Derek Shih	Jay Chou		3:41
2.	"**Ring Ring Ring**"	Zhang Jia-wei	Bryan Chang		3:16
3.	"**What Happened to Us**" (我們怎麼了; Wo Men Zen Me Le)	Lu Yi-qing, Derek Shih	Lu Yi-qing, Tank		4:00
4.	"**Wisteria**" (紫藤花; Zi Teng Hua)	Daryl Yao	Carlsson, Andreas Mikael Yacoub, Rami Porter, K. C.	cover of Westlife - Soledad	4:00
5.	"**Goodbye My Love**"	Tso An-an, Derek Shih	Tso An-an, Howard Blake		4:00
6.	"Super Star"	Derek Shih	Jade&Geoman From Sweetbox		3:14
7.	"Gray Sky" (天灰; Tian Hui)	Voice Feng, Derek Shih	Voice Feng		4:01
8.	"Solo Madrigal" (獨唱情歌; Du Chang Qing Ge)	Daryl Yao	Tank	Selina and Tank duet	4:55
9.	"Flowers Have Blossomed" (花都開好了; Hua Dou Kai Hao Le)	Derek Shih	Tso An-an		3:42
10.	"I.O.I.O"	Han Ji	Maurice Gibb, Barry Gibb		2:57
11.	"Migratory Bird" (候鳥; Hou Niao)	Vincent Fang	Jay Chou		4:41
12.	"Don't Wanna Grow Up" (不想長大; Bu Xiang Zhang Da)	Derek Shih	Tso An-an		3:44
13.	"Persian Cat" (波斯貓; Bo Si Mao)	Wu Hsiung	Bing Wang		4:02
14.	"He Still Can't Understand" (他還是不懂; Ta Hai Shi Bu Dong)	Jennifer Hsu	Bing Wang		4:16
15.	"Starlight" (星光; Xing Guang)	Chen Hsin Yen	Tso An-an		3:52
16.	"A Vision Of Eternity" (一眼萬年; Yi Yan Wan Nian)	Daryl Yao	JJ Lin		4:29
17.	"Laurel Tree Goddess Daphne" (月桂女神; Yue Gui Nu Shen)	Vincent Fang	Li Tien Lung		5:11
18.	"Satisfaction" (痛快; Tong Kuai)	Derek Shih	Tso An-an		3:18
Total length:					72:38

== Bonus DVD ==
1. "觸電" (Electric Shock) MV - composed by Jay Chou - feat Joseph Chang with Selina as lead
2. "Ring Ring Ring" MV
3. "Super Star" MV
4. "波斯貓" (Persian Cat) MV
5. "我愛你" (I Love You) MV
6. "星光" (Starlight) MV
7. "不想長大" (Don't Wanna Grow Up) MV
8. Super Model Dancing Steps (Super Model 舞蹈教學)

== Charts ==
=== Weekly charts ===
Chart (2006)	Peak position
Malaysian Chinese Albums (RIM)	1
