= Meili Xin Shijie =

Meili Xin Shijie may refer to:

- A Beautiful New World, a 1999 Chinese film directed by Shi Runjiu
- Genesis (S.H.E album), a 2002 Mandopop album by the girl group S.H.E
