= I.n.g =

Taiwanese girl group

i.n.g
- Born: Republic of China (Taiwan)
- Years active: 2006
- Musical career
- Origin: Republic of China (Taiwan)
- Genres: Mandopop
- Label: Avex Taiwan
- Past members: Ida, Nara, Gillian

i.n.g was a Taiwanese girl group signed under Avex Taiwan. The group consists of Ida, Nara, and Gillian. The group debuted on 5 May 2006, with their first album called Lucky Star. Because i.n.g released their album on the same day as Jolin Tsai, a pop star who had built her fame over a longer period of time, their shot at success took a major hit. Of all the CDs sold in Taiwan during the week of May 5, only 2.46% were Lucky Star. i.n.g debuted at #8 on the G-music charts, but fell down to #11 the next week after Tsai released yet another album. Lucky Star stayed in the G-music Top 20 for ten weeks, but none of the album's songs were ranked on billboard charts.

== Praise and criticism ==
In 2006, as guests on Jacky Wu's show, "Qi Tian Da Sheng," i.n.g was lauded for their dancing ability as well as for their overall future potential. Wu's praise indirectly spiked sales of Lucky Star, which shot up seven places in the G-music charts during the week of 26 May 2006.

Netizens have criticized i.n.g for imitating S.H.E, a girl group that debuted five years earlier. In response, i.n.g stated that they looked up to S.H.E as models of success, and had no plans to make themselves into S.H.E clones.
