= 2gether 4ever World Tour =

2013–2014 concert tour by S.H.E

- Tour by S.H.E
- Location: Asia
- Start date: June 22, 2013
- End date: August 23, 2014
- No. of shows: 22
- Box office: $22 million

S.H.E concert chronology
- S.H.E is the One World Tour (2009–2010); 2gether 4ever World Tour (2013–2014)

2gether 4ever World Tour (Chinese: 2gether 4ever世界巡迴演唱會) is the fourth world tour by Taiwanese girl group S.H.E. The tour generated an estimated NT$660 million (US$22 million) in revenue.

== Background ==
The name of the concert tour is derived from S.H.E’s two compilation albums, Together (2003) and Forever (2006), which serve as the conceptual foundation for the tour. The tour started in the Taipei Arena, Taiwan on June 22–23, 2013, and the tour ended in Singapore on October 26, 2013, temporary as the final performance, and then S.H.E announced that it will start up 2gether 4ever World Tour Encore in 2014. Finally, the tour ended in Guangzhou, China on August 23, 2014, and the whole concert tour had a total of 22 performances.

== Set list ==
Set list in Taipei
1. "Shero"
2. "Can Not Wait" (迫不及待)
3. "Satisfaction" (痛快)
4. "Faraway" (遠方)
5. "Repair Me" (還我)
6. "Belief"
7. Ella Solo:
8. "Shameless" (厚臉皮)
9. "Bad Girl" (壞女孩)
10. Hebe Solo:
11. "LOVE !"
12. "Leave Me Alone" (寂寞寂寞就好)
13. Selina Solo:
14. "Dream" (夢)
15. "Everyone Who Loves Me" (愛我的每個人)
16. "Flowers Have Blossomed" (花都開好了)
17. "Warm Heart" (心還是熱的)
18. "The Innocent Women" (像女孩的女人)
19. "Don't Wanna Grow Up" (不想長大)
20. "Remember"
21. "Chinese" (中國話)
22. "Persian Cat" (波斯貓)
23. "I Love Rainy Night Flower" (我愛雨夜花)
24. "London Bridge Is Falling Down" (倫敦大橋垮下來)
25. "Miss Universe" (宇宙小姐)
26. "A Brand New Me" (明天的自己)(A CAPPELLA Ver.)
27. "Tropical Rainforest" (熱帶雨林)
28. "Scarf" (圍巾)(6/22)
29. "The Smile of Summer" (夏天的微笑)(6/23)
30. "Wife" (老婆)
31. "Dear Tree Hole" (親愛的樹洞)
32. "Grey Sky" (天灰)
33. "Mayday" (五月天)
34. "Where's Love" (愛呢)
35. "When the Angels Sing" (天使在唱歌)
36. "Message of Happiness" (幸福留言)
37. "Magic" (魔力)
38. "Daybreak" (天亮了)
39. "Super Star"
40. "I Love You" (我愛你)

Encore

1. "Blossomy" (花又開好了)
2. "Not Yet Lovers" (戀人未滿)
3. "Genesis" (美麗新世界)

Double encore

1. "Never Say Goodbye" (不說再見) (6/23)

== Tour dates ==
List of tour dates
Date	City	Country	Venue	Attendance
June 22, 2013	Taipei	Taiwan	Taipei Arena	24,000
June 23, 2013	Taipei	Taiwan	Taipei Arena	24,000
June 29, 2013	Macau		Cotai Arena	—
July 13, 2013	Shanghai	China	Mercedes-Benz Arena	—
July 20, 2013	Kuala Lumpur	Malaysia	Putra Indoor Stadium	12,000
August 10, 2013	Guangzhou	China	Guangzhou Gymnasium	—
August 31, 2013	Chengdu	China	Chengdu Sports Centre	—
September 7, 2013	Nanjing	China	Nanjing Olympic Sports Center Gymnasium	—
September 13, 2013	Beijing	China	Capital Indoor Stadium	—
October 12, 2013	Hong Kong		Hong Kong Coliseum	—
October 13, 2013	Hong Kong		Hong Kong Coliseum	—
October 14, 2013	Hong Kong		Hong Kong Coliseum	—
October 20, 2013	Tianjin	China	Tianjin Sports Centre	—
October 26, 2013	Singapore		Singapore Indoor Stadium	8,000
May 17, 2014	Shenzhen	China	Shenzhen Bay Sports Center	—
May 31, 2014	Wuhan	China	Wuhan Sports Center Gymnasium	—
July 12, 2014	Shanghai	China	Mercedes-Benz Arena	—
July 19, 2014	Kaohsiung	Taiwan	Kaohsiung Arena	11,000
August 2, 2014	Beijing	China	MasterCard Center	15,000
August 9, 2014	Taipei	Taiwan	Taipei Arena	26,000
August 10, 2014	Taipei	Taiwan	Taipei Arena	26,000
August 23, 2014	Guangzhou	China	Guangzhou International Sports Arena	13,000
Total				N/A

== Live albums ==
=== 2gether 4ever Concert Live ===
2gether 4ever Concert Live

Live album by S.H.E
- Released: August 8, 2014
- Recorded: June 23, 2013
- Venue: Taipei Arena
- Genre: Mandarin pop
- Length: 4:23:00
- Label: HIM International Music
- Producer: Bing Wang

S.H.E's live album chronology
S.H.E Is the One (2011)	2gether 4ever Concert Live (2014)	2gether 4ever Encore Concert Live (2015)

2gether 4ever Concert Live (Chinese: 2gether 4ever演唱會影音館) is the fourth live album by the Taiwanese Mandopop girl group S.H.E. It was released on August 8, 2014. The live album recorded the Taipei stop of their "2gether 4ever World Tour". It also includes a bonus DVD of behind the scenes.

==== Track listing ====
1. Opening
2. "SHERO"
3. "Can Not Wait" (迫不及待)
4. "Satisfaction" (痛快)
5. "Faraway" (遠方)
6. "Repair Me" (還我)
7. "Belief"
8. VCR:Ella
9. "Shameless" (厚臉皮)
10. "Bad Girl" (壞女孩)
11. VCR: Hebe
12. "LOVE !"
13. "Leave Me Alone" (寂寞寂寞就好)
14. VCR: Selina
15. "Dream" (夢)
16. "Everyone Who Loves Me" (愛我的每個人)
17. "Flowers Have Blossomed" (花都開好了)
18. "Warm Heart" (心還是熱的)
19. "The Innocent Women" (像女孩的女人)
20. VCR: "Memories of countercurrent" (回憶逆流)
21. "Don't Wanna Grow Up" (不想長大)
22. "Remember"
23. "Chinese" (中國話)
24. "Persian Cat"+"I Love Rainy Night Flower"+"London Bridge Is Falling Down"+"Miss Universe" (波斯貓+我愛雨夜花+倫敦大橋垮下來+宇宙小姐)
25. "A Brand New Me" (明天的自己)
26. "Tropical Rainforest" (熱帶雨林)
27. "The Smile of Summer" (夏天的微笑)
28. "Wife" (老婆)
29. "Dear Tree Hole" (親愛的樹洞)
30. "Grey Sky" (天灰)
31. VCR: "The Journey We Started Together" (一起開始的旅程)
32. "Mayday" (五月天)
33. "Where's Love" (愛呢)
34. "When the Angels Sing"+"Message of Happiness"+"Magic" (天使在唱歌+幸福留言+魔力)
35. "Daybreak" (天亮了)
36. "Super Star"
37. "I Love You" (我愛你)
38. VCR: "Because of you" (因為有你們)
39. "Blossomy" (花又開好了)
40. "Not Yet Lovers" (戀人未滿)
41. "Genesis" (美麗新世界)
42. "Never Say Goodbye" (不說再見)
43. Bonus Track:"Scarf" (圍巾)
44. 2gether 4ever behind the scenes

=== 2gether 4ever Encore Concert Live ===
2gether 4ever Encore Concert Live

Live album by S.H.E
- Released: July 10, 2015
- Recorded: August 10, 2014
- Venue: Taipei Arena
- Genre: Mandarin pop
- Length: 3:50:00
- Label: HIM International Music
- Producer: Bing Wang

S.H.E's live album chronology
2gether 4ever Concert Live (2014)	2gether 4ever Encore Concert Live (2015)

2gether 4ever Concert Encore Live (Chinese: 2gether 4ever Encore演唱會影音館) is the Taiwanese girl group S.H.E's the 5th live album. It was released on July 10, 2015. The live album recorded the Taipei stop of their "2gether 4ever World Tour Encore". It also includes a bonus DVD of behind the scenes, and the special songs at other scenes of the tour concert.

==== Track listing ====
1. Opening: "The Girls" (VCR)
2. "Super Star"
3. "Can Not Wait" (迫不及待)
4. "Star Light" (星光)
5. "He Still Can't Understand" (他還是不懂)
6. "Repair Me" (還我)
7. "Don't Say Sorry" (別說對不起)
8. VCR: "The First Girl" (第一個女孩)
9. "Later" (後來)
10. "The Real Me" (真的我)
11. VCR: "The Second Girl" (第二個女孩)
12. "Lifelong Event" (終身大事)
13. "Fickle" (無常)
14. VCR: "The Third Girl" (第三個女孩)
15. "The Blossom of Youth" (青春是)
16. "My Fondness Only You Can Be Visible" (我的溫柔只有你看得見)
17. VCR: "Watching the girl on the stage" (看著台上的女孩)
18. "Fires of Heaven" (星星之火)
19. "Tropical Rainforest" (熱帶雨林)
20. "Wife" (老婆)
21. "A Brand New Me" (明天的自己)
22. "Moonlight in the City" (城裡的月光)
23. "Fridge" (冰箱)
24. VCR: "Fighting! Girls" (戰鬥吧！女孩)
25. "Miss Universe" (宇宙小姐)
26. "Remember"
27. "Chinese" (中國話)
28. "Persian Cat" (波斯貓)
29. "Don't Wanna Grow Up" (不想長大)
30. "When the Angels Sing"+"Message of Happiness"+"Magic" (天使在唱歌+幸福留言+魔力)
31. VCR: "The Shining Girls" (閃閃發亮的女孩)
32. "SHERO"
33. "Love So Right" (愛就對了)
34. "Daybreak" (天亮了)
35. "The Story of Clover" (三葉草的故事)
36. "Mayday" (五月天)
37. "Where's Love" (愛呢)
38. "Blossomy" (花又開好了)
39. "Not Yet Lovers" feat. Power Station (戀人未滿 feat. 動力火車)
40. "Rainbow"+"Piquancy" feat. Power Station (彩虹+痛快 feat. 動力火車)
41. "Sky" by Power Station feat. Lu Jixing (天空 by 動力火車feat.盧皆興(桑布伊))
42. "Genesis" (美麗新世界)
43. "The Moon Represents My Heart" (月亮代表我的心)
