= Once Upon a Time (S.H.E album) =

Studio album by S.H.E
- Released: November 25, 2005
- Recorded: 2005
- Genre: Mandopop
- Length: 42:35
- Label: HIM International Music
- Producer: Bing Wang

S.H.E chronology
| Encore (2004) | Once Upon a Time (2005) | Forever (New Songs + Great Hits) (2006) |

Singles from Once Upon a Time
- 1. "Don't Wanna Grow Up" Released: November 9, 2005; 2. "Grey Sky" Released: November 25, 2005; 3. "Not Your Friend" Released: November 25, 2005

Once Upon a Time (Chinese: 不想長大; pinyin: Bu Xiang Zhang Da; lit. 'Don't Wanna Grow Up') is the seventh studio album by Taiwanese girl group S.H.E. It was released on November 25, 2005, by HIM International Music. As of December 14, 2005, the album had shipped over 1 million copies across Asia.

== Background and composition ==
This album features music styles with European myth elements such as a musical composition by Mozart in "不想長大" (Don't Wanna Grow Up) as well as Greek elements in the lyrics of "月桂女神" (Laurel Tree Goddess – Daphne). "Super Model" was used to promote Daphne Shoes' D18 line of shoes, while "Laurel Tree Goddess – Daphne" was a general promotional song. The track "星星之火" (Fires of Heaven) was composed by Malaysian Chinese singer-songwriter Gary Chaw.

== Reception ==
The tracks "Super Model" was nominated for Top 10 Gold Songs and "不想長大" (Don't Wanna Grow Up) won Top 10 Gold Songs and Top 10 Gold Song Gold Award at the Hong Kong TVB8 Awards, presented by television station TVB8, in 2006.

== Music videos ==
Directed by Jay Chou, the music video for "Not Gonna Be Your Friend" touches upon themes of male homosexuality, unlike the video for "Belief" in Youth Society have the several couple of heterosexuality. Selina, Hebe and Ella are three girls who are fawning over a male friend of theirs, only to find out that the friend is gay and already has a boyfriend.

== Track listing ==
| No. | Title | Lyrics | Music | Arrangement | Length |
|---|---|---|---|---|---|
| 1. | "Don't Wanna Grow Up" ("不想長大" Bu Xiang Zhang Da) | Derek Shih | Tso An-an | Taz Tan | 3:46 |
| 2. | "Super Model" | Isaac Chen | Edward Chan | Edward Chan | 3:36 |
| 3. | "Not Gonna Be Your Friend" ("不作你的朋友" Bu Zuo Ni De Peng You) | David Ke | Tank | Michael Lin | 3:58 |
| 4. | "Grey Sky" ("天灰" Tian Hui) | Voice Feng, Derek Shih | Voice Feng | Dong Yun-Chang | 4:03 |
| 5. | "Laurel Tree Goddess" ("月桂女神" Yue Gui Nü Shen) | Vincent Fang | Li Tien Lung | David Lu | 5:13 |
| 6. | "Oasis" ("綠洲" Lü Zhou) | Derek Shih, Venk Yang | Venk Yang | Max Tu | 4:30 |
| 7. | "Thank You for Letting Me Love You" ("謝謝你讓我愛過你" Xie Xie Ni Rang Wo Ai Guo Ni) | Derek Shih | Debbie Huang | David Lu | 4:15 |
| 8. | "Good People Will Rewarded in Kind" ("好人有好抱" Hao Ren You Hao Bao) | Daryl Yao | Tank | Dong Yun-Chang | 4:43 |
| 9. | "Sharpshooter" ("神槍手" Shen Qiang Shou / Producer : S.H.E) | Alang Huang | Bing Wang | Bing Wang | 3:40 |
| 10. | "Fires of Heaven" ("星星之火" Xing Xing Zhi Huo) | Justin Chen | Gary Chaw | Yao Hung | 4:47 |
| Total length: | | | | | 42:35 |

== Charts ==
=== Weekly charts ===
| Chart (2005) | Peak position |
|---|---|
| Taiwanese Albums (G-Music) | 1 |

=== Year-end charts ===
| Chart (2005) | Position |
|---|---|
| Taiwanese Albums (Note: Best-selling albums of the year in Taiwan as reported by media outlets) | 3 |

== Sales ==
| Region | Certification | Certified units/sales |
|---|---|---|
| Asia | — | 2,500,000 |
