= Magical Love =

- Genre: Romance; Comedy
- Opening theme: "Remember" by S.H.E
- Ending theme: "Belief" by S.H.E
- Country of origin: Taiwan
- Original language: Mandarin
- No. of episodes: 20

Production
- Running time: 60 minutes (with advertising)

Original release
- Network: TTV
- Release: 23 January 2002

Magical Love (Chinese: 愛情大魔咒; pinyin: Ai Qing Da Mo Zhou) is a Taiwanese television series. It stars the members of Taiwanese girl-group S.H.E, Lan Cheng-lung and Janet Li. It is a romance drama with 20 episodes.

== Synopsis ==
Yaoqi, Zhu Liye and Hu ShaSha are Dreaming Cheer squad. They are also the trio-star-chaser. In the cab where Zhu LiYe, Yao qi and Hu ShaSha ride in, they chase all the way to the vans driven by stars. Directed by YaoQi, the tacit three girls show their bands and posters, shout out their worship to their idol. They never care about the dangers of bumping the cars driven by stars....

== Cast ==
- Ella Chen as Juliet
- Lan Cheng-lung as Li Tao
- Hebe Tian as Hu Sha Sha
- Li Qian Rong as Ding Wen Lin
- Liu Zhi Wei as An Dong Hai
- Peng Xiao Tong as Yao Qi
