= Encore (S.H.E album) =

Studio album by S.H.E
- Released: November 12, 2004
- Recorded: 2004
- Genre: Mandopop
- Length: 40:45
- Language: Mandarin
- Label: HIM International Music
- Producers: Joeloe Kuo; Venk Yang

S.H.E chronology
Magical Journey (2004)	Encore (2004)	Once Upon A Time (2005)

Encore (Chinese: 安可) is the sixth studio album by Taiwanese girl group S.H.E. It was released on November 12, 2004, by HIM International Music. This is the first album that S.H.E released in the autumn, on account of Selina's graduation from university. A second Encore (DVD Plus Edition) was also released.

The album was commercially successful upon release, peaking at number one on the album charts in Malaysia and Singapore. It sold over 2 million copies throughout Asia by August 2005.

== Background and release ==
"候鳥" (Migratory Bird) was composed by Jay Chou and features Chinese music elements. It was the Mandarin theme song of Japanese film, Quill. This song was written on behalf of Ella's previous relationship which had ended on a bad note. After "我愛你" (I Love You) was produced, Sweetbox re-sang it as "More than Love".

== Accolades ==
The track "Migratory Bird" won one of the Top 10 Songs of the Year at the 2005 HITO Radio Music Awards presented by Taiwanese radio station Hit FM. It was also nominated for Top 10 Gold Songs at the Hong Kong TVB8 Awards, presented by television station TVB8, in 2005. Encore was awarded one of the Top 10 Selling Mandarin Albums of the Year at the 2005 IFPI Hong Kong Album Sales Awards, presented by the Hong Kong branch of IFPI.

== Music videos ==
The music video for "我愛你" (I Love You) was filmed in Shanghai. There are two versions of the video: a 3-minute TV version, and a 12-minute full version. The 12-minute version features two elderly people who reflect upon their love life back when they were still young.

In 1940s Shanghai, the girl tells her lover that her family is moving to Taiwan, likely due to the Chinese Civil War. She gives the boy a box containing her love inside, and leaves in tears. In 1989, the girl, now a grandmother of at least two children, receives a letter from the boy, now a single elderly man. Unlike the grandmother, who seems to enjoy life with her husband, children and grandchildren, the old man has been waiting for the past few decades for his lover to come back to Shanghai.

== Track listing ==
No.	Title	Lyrics	Music	Notes	Length
1.	"Migratory Bird" ("候鳥" Hou Niao)	Vincent Fang	Jay Chou		4:44
2.	"Satisfaction" ("痛快" Tong Kuai)	Derek Shih	Tso An-an	Raciness [iTunes UK+Australia] / Piquancy [iTunes US]	3:19
3.	"Don't Say Sorry" ("別說對不起" Bie Shuo Dui Bu Qi)	Yu Fang	Britney Spears, Annet Artani	Cover of Everytime by Britney Spears	3:52
4.	"I Love You" ("我愛你" Wo Ai Ni)	Daryl Yao	Geoman, Villalon From Sweetbox	Cover of More Than Love by Sweetbox	3:55
5.	"Matador's Song" ("鬥牛士之歌" Dou Niu Shi Zhi Ge)	Daryl Yao	Tso An-an		3:50
6.	"Take Seat By Number" ("對號入座" Dui Hao Ru Zuo)	Yu Guang Zhong	Bob Heatlie	Cover of Japanese Boy by Aneka	4:04
7.	"Golden Shield, Iron Cloth" ("金鐘罩鐵布衫" Jin Zhong Zhao Tie Bu Shan)	Funck	Funck		4:05
8.	"Female Chauvinism" ("大女人主義" Da Nu Ren Zhu Yi)	Jennifer Hsu	Gary Chaw		3:59
9.	"Absent" ("不在場" Bu Zai Chang)	Francis Lee	Lotus Wang		4:32
10.	"Keep Smiling" ("保持微笑" Bao Chi Wei Xiao)	Derek Shih	Will Ng		4:21
Total length:					40:45

== Charts ==
=== Weekly charts ===
Chart (2004)	Peak position
Malaysian Albums (RIM)	1
Singaporean Albums (RIAS)	1

== Sales ==
Region	Certification	Certified units/sales
Asia	—	2,000,000
