= Super Star (S.H.E album) =

Studio album by S.H.E
- Released: 22 August 2003
- Genre: Mandopop
- Length: 40:49
- Label: HIM International Music, EMI
- Producer: Joeloe Kuo

S.H.E chronology
Together (Best Collection) (2003)	Super Star (2003)	Magical Journey (2004)

Super Star is the fourth studio album by Taiwanese girl group S.H.E. It was released on 22 August 2003. Ella suffered a back injury during the shooting of a television show one month before the album was released. Because of this, Ella is absent from some of the music videos. As of 2006, the single "Super Star" from this album has been S.H.E's biggest hit. German producer Roberto "Geo" Rosan and vocalist Jade Villalon, as Sweetbox, composed "Super Star" for S.H.E during the sessions for Sweetbox's Adagio, and they also released their own English version as a single at the time. In 2004, Canadian singer Skye Sweetnam re-recorded "Super Star" as "Superstar".

== Reception ==
Super Star continued Youth Society's success by landing six songs on the HITORadio Top 10 charts. Furthermore, Super Star earned S.H.E their second consecutive Best Group and Best Chart Performance awards at the 2004 HITO Awards. The album's title track itself was also well received. "Super Star" was crowned Metro Radio's 2004 Song of the Year, and recognized as one of the year's best songs at the HITO Radio Music Awards, Singapore Hit Awards, and Hong Kong TVB8 Awards. The four awards earned by "Super Star" were the most for any S.H.E song until "Don't Wanna Grow Up" (Once Upon a Time) earned six between 2006 and 2007.

== Music videos ==
Both "Far Away" and "River Shore Park" are based on themes of lost love. "Super Star", while dominated by a rock concert concept, contains a loose love plot where the girl is rejected, only to receive a kiss later in the video. "Heavy Rain" is a story of companion love between two parents, played by Selina and Hebe. "I.O.I.O" is a story of two girls, Selina and Hebe, fighting over a boy (Ella) who actually doesn't like either girl in the first place. The video was the first to feature S.H.E super deformed; more concrete versions were featured in S.H.E's next album, Magical Journey.

== Track listing ==
No.	Title	Lyrics	Music	Arrangement	Length
1.	"Super Star"	Derek Shih	Jade Valerie Villalon, Roberto Geoman Rosan	Jade Valerie Villalon, Roberto Geoman Rosan	3:14
2.	"遠方" (Far Away)	Derek Shih	Andrew Fromm, Calum Maccoll, Howie Dorough	Yao Hung	4:07
3.	"北歐神話" (The Legend of Northern Europe)	Vincent Fang	Anan Zuo	Yao Hung	5:11
4.	"半糖主義" (Half Sugarism)	Jennifer Hsu	Lindy Robbins, Kevin Savigar	Bing Wang	3:36
5.	"河濱公園" (Riverside Park)	Vincent Fang	Jay Chou	BabyC	3:52
6.	"I.O.I.O"	Han Ji	Maurice Gibb, Barry Gibb	David Lu	2:57
7.	"長相思" (Always Missing)	Derek Shih	Anan Zuo	Yao Hung	4:23
8.	"落大雨" (Heavy Rain)	Anson Yen, Derek Shih	David Tao	Bing Wang	4:11
9.	"夏天的微笑" (The Smile of Summer)	Daryl Yao	Real Huang	BabyC	4:46
10.	"你太誠實" (You Are Too Honest)	Jennifer Hsu	Deep White (Arys Chien)	Yao Hung	4:08
Total length:					40:25

== Charts ==
=== Weekly charts ===
Chart (2003)	Peak position
Malaysian Albums (RIM)	2
