= Play (S.H.E album) =

- CD+DVD cover

Studio album by S.H.E
- Released: May 11, 2007
- Genre: Mandopop
- Length: 43:12
- Language: Mandarin
- Label: HIM International Music
- Producers: S.H.E, David Tao

S.H.E chronology
| Forever (2006) | Play (2007) | FM S.H.E (2008) |

Singles from FM S.H.E
- 1. "Chinese Language" Released: April 16, 2007; 2. "May Day" Released: May 11, 2007

Play is the eighth studio album by Taiwanese girl group S.H.E. It was released on May 11, 2007, by HIM International Music. During the week of its release, Play accounted for over half of all Taiwanese album sales, beating out its runner up by over 40% of the market share. Over 100,000 copies of the album were pre-ordered; by mid-July, the sales total reached 500,000.

Despite being tainted by cross-straits controversy, "Chinese Language", the album's lead single, earned six awards, including one for its music video. Due to the overall popularity of the album, Play became the first S.H.E album to warrant its own concert, which was held at the Tamshui Fisherman's Wharf in July.

The track "May Day" (五月天) won one of the Top 10 Songs of the Year at the 2008 Hito Radio Music Awards presented by Taiwanese radio station Hit FM.

== Background and release ==
Following Forever album release in July, rumours had circulated around the Internet regarding S.H.E's tenth album. On March 30, 2007, The Beijing News reported that S.H.E had begun filming a music video for "Chinese Language", the lead single for their newest album. Mere hours later, Tom.com revealed that the new album would be called Play, quashing contradictory rumours about the album's name. On April 12, 2007, HIM announced that album's second single would be "May Day"; however, the song itself had nothing to do with the band. Mayday was so ecstatic that a song had been named after them that they promised to write songs for S.H.E in the future.

After years of criticism for covering too many songs, S.H.E finally produced two pieces for this album. Selina and Ella collaborated to produce "Wife" (老婆), while Hebe was responsible for "Say You Love Me" (說你愛我). The song "Listen to Yuan Wei-ren Play Guitar" (聽袁惟仁彈吉他) was announced as part of Play on April 13. David Tao composed "Good Mood - Just be Yourself" in two versions, one for Play, and another for Rene Liu's newest album. "好心情Just be yourself" became the successor to "Super Model" as Daphne Shoes' promotional song. On April 20, HIM set up countdowns at S.H.E's Xuite and MSN Space to count down to the album's release date.

== Composition ==
The songs come from a potpourri of music genres, ranging from slow pop ballads to hip hop to a sound influenced by traditional Chinese music. Three tracks are tributes to accomplishments of three different artists, namely Yuan Wei Jen, S.H.E's mastering producer up until 2004, superstar Jay Chou, and S.H.E themselves.

== Reception ==
The album's lead single, "Chinese Language," was released on April 16, 2007, and debuted at #9 on the KKBOX Music Charts. The song climbed seven spots before perching itself at the top of the charts on April 18. Preorders for Play totalled over 100,000 one week before the album's release date. During its first week of sales, Play topped 15 different music charts. The following week, all eleven tracks cracked the top 20 on the Inkui Top 50 charts. The album's second single, "Mayday", was China's seventh most requested song in karaoke bars. Critics praised the album as an "excellent" showcase of S.H.E's "angelic harmonization." By mid-July, around 500,000 copies of the album were sold. Not all reception has been positive, however. Johnny Neihu, a Taipei Times columnist, found the album's lead single to be so disgusting that he barely "managed to drag [himself] out the door."

In response to album sales, S.H.E held a concert at the Tamshui Fisherman's Wharf, with their setlist consisting entirely of songs from Play. The concert drew 20,000 fans. On September 24, S.H.E announced another concert, which will be held on November 10 in Zhuhai, in preparation for the Changsha stop of their Perfect 3 World Tour.

== Music videos ==
For the music video of "May Day," label HIM recruited Mayday's lead singer, Ashin, to play the lead male role for the video. In the MV, "Excuses", the male used is actually not Jay Chou, but a television host who is known for his ability to mimic Chou. It has been rumored that the original film with the real Jay Chou was ruined because of the hot weather, so they decided to make it a second time, using a fake Jay Chou, just to have a little bit more fun. The "Thank You For Your Gentleness" MV included Fahrenheit.

== Zhong Guo Hua controversy ==
"Chinese Language," the album's main hit, was heavily criticised by pro-Taiwanese-independence critics as "praising China", or "kissing China's ass" in the lyrics of the song. Their record company cleared them for the above accusation, claiming that the song was praising the language if anything else, and stated that critics should not mix politics and music.

== Track listing ==
| No. | Title | Lyrics | Music | Arrangement | Length |
|---|---|---|---|---|---|
| 1. | "Chinese Language" ("中國話" Zhong Guo Hua) | Zheng Nan, Derek Shih | Zheng Nan | Bing Wang | 3:14 |
| 2. | "Thanks for Your Gentleness" ("謝謝你的溫柔" Xie Xie Ni De Wen Rou / feat. Fahrenheit) | Ashin, Derek Shih | Ashin, Lotus Wang | Lotus Wang, David Lu | 4:36 |
| 3. | "Listen to Yuan Wei-ren Play Guitar" ("聽袁惟仁彈吉他" Ting Yuan Wei Ren Tan Ji Ta) | Alex Chang Jien | Alex Chang Jien | Alex Chang Jien | 4:21 |
| 4. | "May Day" ("五月天" Wu Yue Tian) | Chen Zheng, Derek Shih | Zheng Nan | David Lu | 3:52 |
| 5. | "Excuses" ("藉口" Jie Kou) | Chen Zheng | Zheng Nan, Tso An-an | Yao Hung | 4:06 |
| 6. | "Boom" | Jennifer Hsu | Steve Smith, Anthony Anderson, Sean Hosein, Dan Deviller, Alisha Pillay | Steve Smith, Anthony Anderson, Sean Hosein, Dan Deviller, Alisha Pillay | 3:26 |
| 7. | "See You, Cambridge" ("再別康橋" Zai Bie Kang Qiao) | Crystal Xu | Li Quan | Mac Chew | 4:10 |
| 8. | "London Bridge Is Falling Down" ("倫敦大橋垮下來" Lun Dun Da Qiao Kua Xia Lai) | Percy Phang | Zheng Nan | David Lu | 3:26 |
| 9. | "Say You Love Me" ("說你愛我" Shuo Ni Ai Wo) | Hebe | | David Lu | 4:32 |
| 10. | "Good Mood - Just Be Yourself" ("好心情 Just Be Yourself" Hao Xin Qing Just Be Yourself) | WaWa | David Tao | David Tao | 3:27 |
| 11. | "Wife" ("老婆" Lao Po) | Selina | Ella | Bing Wang | 3:55 |
| 12. | "Always Open" (with Fahrenheit / pre-order bonus track) |
| Total length: | | | | | 42:12 |

== Charts ==
=== Weekly charts ===
| Chart (2007) | Peak position |
|---|---|
| Taiwanese Albums (G-Music) | 1 |

=== Year-end charts ===
| Chart (2007) | Position |
|---|---|
| Taiwanese Albums (Note: Best-selling albums of the year in Taiwan as reported by media outlets) | 3 |
