= Shero (album) =

- Gorgeous edition cover

Studio album by S.H.E
- Released: March 26, 2010
- Recorded: 2009–2010
- Genre: Mandopop
- Length: 39:51
- Language: Mandarin
- Label: HIM International Music
- Producer: S.H.E, Bing Wang, Yuan Wei Jen, Ashin, Peter Lee

S.H.E chronology
Map of Love (2009)	Shero (2010)	Blossomy (2012)

Alternative cover
- Avant-garde edition cover

Singles from Shero
- 1. "Shero" Released: March 10, 2010; 2. "Loving You" Released: May 5, 2010

Shero is the tenth studio album by Taiwanese girl group S.H.E. It was released on March 26, 2010, by HIM International Music in two editions: Shero (Gorgeous Edition) with a bonus DVD of nine music videos from 2008 to 2009 and Shero (Avant-garde Edition) with a bonus DVD of S.H.E’s FM S.H.E Taipei Concert.

== Songs ==
The album features 10 new tracks. The title track, "Shero" is written by Mayday's Ashin and 831 vocalist, Up Lee. The song encourages females to just be their own 'Shero' if they can't find their 'Hero'. It was also the theme song for 2010 Taipei International Flower Expo. The track "Love So Right" (愛就對了) is a cover of Kate Voegele's "Angel". "Desert Island", a collaboration with Judy Chou, is the best-selling digital single of all time, with digital sales of 18.6 million.

== Reception ==
The track "Shero" and "Love So Right" (愛就對了) are listed at number 7 and 28 respectively on the Hit FM Top 100 Singles of the Year chart for 2010. The album is the third best selling album in Taiwan in 2010, with 68,000 copies sold. Download singles, ringtones and ringback tones from the album's tracks sold a collective total of 43.3 million copies in China.

== Music videos ==
In the music video of "愛就對了" (Just Love), Hebe and Bryant Chang play a couple in a war of love. Because of the difference in their heights, the scene where they needed to jump and hug mid-air took about 50 tries to complete. The MV for "你不會" (You Won't) stars Taiwanese actress Li Jia Ying as the female lead.

== Track listing ==
No.	Title	Lyrics	Music	Arrangement	Length
1.	"Shero"	Ashin	Up Lee	Up Lee, TEN	3:14
2.	"如果你是女孩" (If You Were a Girl)	Chen Hsin Yen	Roger Joseph Manning Jr., Scott Simons	Isaac Lim, terrytyelee	3:33
3.	"我愛雨夜花" (I Love Rainy Night Flower)	Chou Tien Wang, Chang Hsi An	Teng Yu Hsien, Chang Hsi An	JerryC	4:02
4.	"兩個人的荒島 Duet with Judy Chou (周定緯)" (Desert Island)	Hsiang Yueh E	JJ Lin	David Lu	4:03
5.	"少了一個人" (Without You)	Daryl Yao	Zheng Nan	Terence Teo	4:37
6.	"收留我" (Take Me Away)	Chen Le Rong	Jessica Beach, Dave Pickell, Joe Cruz	David Lu	3:48
7.	"超可能 (TV Drama "A Story of Du Lala's Promotion" [杜拉拉升职记] theme song)" (Possibility)	Daryl Yao	terrytyelee, Dominique Tsai	terrytyelee	4:14
8.	"愛上你 (TV Drama "Down with Love" [就想賴著妳] theme song)" (Loving You)	Lan Xiao Xie	Venk Yang	David Lu	3:59
9.	"你不會" (You Won't Be)	Daryl Yao	Zheng Nan	David Lu	4:16
10.	"愛就對了" (Love So Right)	Derek Shih	Kate Voegele	Jay Hung	4:10
Total length:					39:51

== Bonus DVD ==
Gorgeous Version (2008/2009 MV)

1. "宇宙小姐" MV
2. "沿海公路的出口" MV
3. "女孩當自強" MV
4. "安靜了" MV
5. "月光手札" MV
6. "612星球" MV
7. "可愛萬歲" MV
8. "夢田" MV
9. "鎖住時間" MV

Avant-garde Version (FM S.H.E Taipei Concert)

1. 呼叫S.H.E宇宙警報VCR
2. "宇宙小姐"
3. "我愛煩惱"
4. "我是火星人"
5. "612星球"
6. "女孩當自強"
7. "店小二"
8. "安靜了"
9. "沿海公路的出口"

== Charts ==
=== Weekly charts ===
Chart (2010)	Peak position
Taiwanese Albums (G-Music)	1

=== Year-end charts ===
Chart (2010)	Position
Taiwanese Albums (Note: Best-selling albums of the year in Taiwan as reported by media outlets)	3
