= Youth Society =

Studio album by S.H.E
- Released: January 29, 2002
- Recorded: 2001–2002
- Genre: Mandopop
- Length: 39:50
- Language: Mandarin
- Label: HIM International Music
- Producer: Guo Wenzong; Tso An-an

S.H.E chronology
| Girls' Dorm (2001) | Youth Society (2002) | Genesis (2002) |

Youth Society (Chinese: 青春株式會社; pinyin: Qīngchūn Zhūshì Huìshè) is the second studio album by Taiwanese girl group S.H.E. The album was released on January 29, 2002, by HIM International Music, four months after the group's debut album, Girls' Dorm. With the release of this album, "S.H.E Girl Friends" underwent a name change and became simply "S.H.E." It features S.H.E's first collaboration with Jay Chou, who composed "Tropical Rain Forest."

This album features a larger number of covers relative to Girls' Dorm, including "Remember," "Give Me More," "Hypnotism" and "I've Never Been To Me." Musically, Youth Society incorporates genres like pop, hip-hop, R&B, ballads, and Britpop. Youth Society was a commercial success at home and abroad, selling more than 1.25 million copies in Asia to date. In Taiwan, it sold more than a quarter million copies, becoming the fifth highest-selling album of the year.

== Background and development ==
On September 11, 2001, the day of the attacks on the World Trade Center, S.H.E released their debut album, Girls' Dorm, in memory of their prior living quarters. It ended up selling an impressive 150,000 copies for a debut group, quashing speculations of an unremarkable debut due to the incident. After Girls Dorm' sold an excess 750,000 units throughout Asia, recording for the group's sophomore album began immediately. In the album, in addition to Derek Shih, who is responsible for coordinating the lyrics to five songs, there are also Vincent Fang, Jennifer Hsu and other participants in the production. Based on S.H.E's sound quality, vocals, positioning and potential, the album was created.

== Writing and recording ==
The lead single "Remember" is a classical and hip-hop style cover song with lyrics by Derek Shih; the original song is "Super Star" by Sweetbox and the chorus melody is from the classical score Swan Lake. Tso An-an, who created "Beauty Up My Life" last time, created the "Belief," which is a lyrical R&B song with Chinese style influences that serves as a follow-up to the group's 2001 song "Not Yet Lovers." "A Message of Happiness" is one of Selina Jen's favorite songs. The song, composed by Lotus Wang, fully depicts the unspeakable but truly touching friendship between friends or classmates. The producer wanted S.H.E to sing together in the studio, and they had to hold hands and sing together, recording under the condition of playing games and singing together, and collecting a lot of sounds of the three of them playing on the spot, so it would feel especially warm and real.

"Give Me More" is an R&B-dance song written by Yan Xixuan, which is actually a Mandarin language cover of Charlie's "There You Go Again." The song "Tropical Rainforest" is a pop and R&B ballad written by Vincent Fang and Jay Chou. The record company originally planned to let Ella Chen sing the song. Selina Jen and Hebe Tien are mainly responsible for the harmony, so the key of "Tropical Rainforest" is set at the lower key that Chen is good at singing in. However, after entering the recording studio, it was discovered that Jen and Tien also have a unique tone to sing the bass voice, and it was a bold attempt for the two of them who were good at high notes, so the company finally decided to let the three of them sing "Tropical Rainforest." The original version of the song "Remember to Forget" is the song "Suki na Hito" by the Japanese duo Kiroro. The song "Scarf" was written by Matthew Yen; while its music was composed by Tanya Chua.

"Requirement for Loving Me" is a pop ballad written by Jennifer Hsu, which shows S.H.E.'s melodious harmonies and their respective vocal characteristics. As a more characteristic bitter love song, the lyrics "One can save his own happiness, don't cry for you anymore" exhibit a kind of bittersweet love. When they first got the song "Requirement for Loving Me" Selina, Hebe and Ella said that it was a more challenging song and also very distinctive, so the three of them felt that they should express the message of "Requirement for Loving Me" in a special way. "Hypnotism" is a Thai-style dance song. The final track on the album is a cover of Charlene's "I've Never Been To Me."

== Release and promotion ==
"Remember" served as the theme song to the Taiwanese TV series Magical Love.

=== Singles and music videos ===
The track "熱帶雨林" (Tropical Rain Forest) is listed number 4 on Hit Fm Taiwan's Hit Fm Annual Top 100 Singles Chart (Hit-Fm年度百首單曲) for 2002. Similar to Girls Dorm, not all of the songs in Youth Society had music videos; the last five tracks used edited concert footage instead. S.H.E's second karaoke VCD combined the music videos from Youth Society with all four videos from Girls Dorm.

== Track listing ==
| No. | Title | Lyrics | Music | Arrangement | Length |
|---|---|---|---|---|---|
| 1. | "Remember" | Derek Shih | Roberto Geoman Rosan, Jade Villalon | BabyC | 3:00 |
| 2. | "Belief" | Derek Shih | Tso An-an | Yao Hung | 4:29 |
| 3. | "幸福留言" (Message of Happiness) | Lin Chih Nien, Derek Shih | Lotus Wang | BabyC | 3:40 |
| 4. | "給我多一點" | Anson Yen | Charlie Pennachio, Drew Sessa, Shaunna Bolton | David Lu | 3:18 |
| 5. | "熱帶雨林" (Tropical Rain Forest) | Vincent Fang | Jay Chou | BabyC | 4:39 |
| 6. | "記得要忘記" (Remember to Forget) | Derek Shih | Chiharu Tamashiro | BabyC | 5:20 |
| 7. | "圍巾" (Scarf) | Matthew Yen | Tanya Chua | Ray Huang, Rafael Lee | 3:49 |
| 8. | "愛我的資格" (Requirement for Loving Me) | Jennier Hsu | Jovi Theng | David Lu | 4:31 |
| 9. | "催眠術" (Hypnotism) | Derek Shih | Pracha Pongsupat, Pornchai Wongcheep | David Lu | 3:12 |
| 10. | "I've Never Been to Me" | Ron Miller, Kenneth Hirsch | Ron Miller, Kenneth Hirsch | John Wang | 3:52 |
| Total length: | | | | | 39:50 |
