= Seventeen (S.H.E song) =

2018 single by S.H.E

- Seventeen digital cover

Single by S.H.E
- Released: 30 August 2018
- Recorded: 2018
- Genre: Mandopop
- Length: 5:08
- Label: HIM International Music
- Songwriter: Greeny Wu
- Producers: Bing Wang, Paula Ma

Music video
- "Seventeen " on YouTube

"Seventeen" (Chinese: 十七) is a 2018 song by the Taiwanese girl group S.H.E, written and composed by Wu Tsing-fong. Specially tailored by Wu for the trio, the commemorative single was digitally released on August 30, 2018, to celebrate the 17th anniversary of S.H.E's debut.

The song ranked fifth on the "2018 Hit Fm Top 100 Singles of the Year chart". The following year, it received two nominations at the "30th Golden Melody Awards" for "Song of the Year" and "Best Music Video".

== Background ==
"Seventeen" is a commemorative single celebrating the 17th anniversary of the Taiwanese girl group S.H.E's debut. The song chronicles the deep bond and mutual support among the three members throughout their journey since debut. To mark this milestone, S.H.E collaborated with singer-songwriter Wu Qing-feng, who was invited to tailor-make the track by writing both its lyrics and music. "Seventeen" premiered simultaneously across over a hundred Asian radio stations on August 29, 2018, and was officially released on digital platforms on August 30, 2018, the accompanying music video was directed by Golden Melody Award-winning director Muh Chen (陳奕仁). The project required over four months of pre-production and mobilized a crew of nearly 200 personnel. The video uses a continuously moving train as a metaphor, employing smooth camera work to narrate the story and visually recount S.H.E's 17-year journey and key milestones. These moments include the trio's first meeting, living together in a girls' dormitory, their first autograph session, winning a Golden Melody Award, pursuing solo careers without disbanding, and Selina's accidental burn injury during a film shoot. The video also recreates the members' past looks from various stages of their career. This project marked S.H.E's first collaboration with Chen and his production company, "Grass Jelly Studio". Following its release on September 7, the music video accumulated over 300,000 views within its first eight hours, and surpassed 1.2 million views in less than two days.

== Track listing ==
No.	Title	Lyrics	Music	Arrangement	Length
1.	"Seventeen" (十七)	Greeny Wu	Greeny Wu	Phil Wen	05:08
Total length:					05:08

== Music videos ==
Title	Director	Release date	Link
"Seventeen" (十七)	Muh Chen (陳奕仁)	September 7, 2018	MV

== Concerts ==
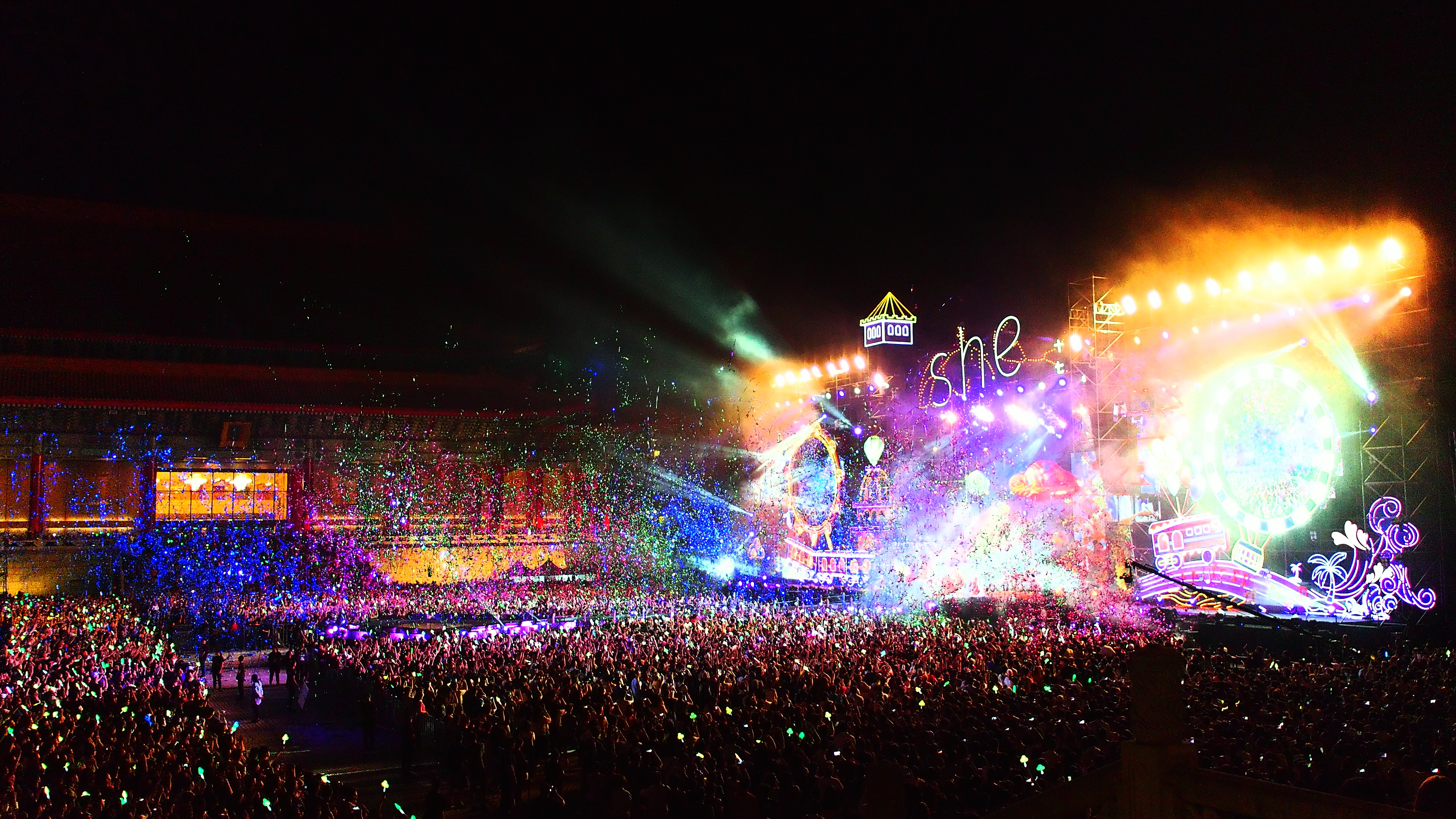
The S.H.E "17" Concert, held at Liberty Square in 2018

To commemorate their 17th anniversary since debut, S.H.E released a commemorative single. Additionally, on September 11, 2018, the group held the "17th Anniversary Concert", a free open-air concert at Liberty Square in Taipei. The outdoor event, which drew tens of thousands of fans, featured an "unplugged" performance and was produced with a budget of NT$30 million. On August 11, 2018, one month prior to the concert, all 12,000 free tickets were claimed within one minute of being released. Prior to the concert, HIM International Music conducted a popularity poll from August 13 to August 19, dubbed My Favorite S.H.E Song, to determine a portion of the setlist that S.H.E would perform on the day of the concert. On the day of the concert on September 11, the event drew 12,000 indoor spectators and attracted additional crowds outside the venue, bringing the total live attendance to an estimated 20,000, and eventually peaking at 5,0000. Meanwhile, the online live streams garnered a combined estimated peak of 2.64 million concurrent viewers. This included 1 million on "Tencent Video" and 1.05 million on "Migu Music" in mainland China, alongside 500,000 views on "LINE Today" and 90,000 views on "S.H.E's official YouTube channel", ultimately attracting a total of over 5 million online viewers. The stage design of the concert was inspired by S.H.E's discography, utilizing the trio's signature colors—pink, green, and blue—as the primary visual theme. Incorporating the train journey concept from their "Seventeen" music video, the production condensed the group's 17-year history into a visual timeline. The train theme first showed a locomotive entering a clover-shaped "Castle Tunnel", then traveling through a musical "Fantasy World", followed by a journey through a "Tropical Rainforest", and ultimately arriving at a "Beautiful New World"(Genesis).

Concert name	Date	City	Country	Venue
17th Anniversary Concert	September 11, 2018	Taipei	Taiwan	Liberty Square

== Chart performance ==
=== Weekly charts ===
Chart	Chart period	Peak position	Ref.
KKBOX Mandarin New Singles Weekly Chart	2018/08/31 — 2018/09/06	3	
KKBOX Mandarin New Singles Weekly Chart	2018/09/07 — 2018/09/13	1	
KKBOX Mandarin New Singles Weekly Chart	2018/09/14 — 2018/09/20	1	
KKBOX Mandarin New Singles Weekly Chart	2018/09/21 — 2018/09/27	1	

== Awards ==
=== Golden Melody Awards ===
Year	Number	Award	Nominated work	Result	Ref.
2019	30th	Song of the Year	Seventeen (十七)	Nominated	
2019	30th	Best Music Video	Muh Chen (陳奕仁)	Nominated	

=== Other awards ===
- 2018 Billboard Radio China - Top 10 Mandopop Songs of 2018 #4
- Singapore YES 933 "Pick of the Pops" (醉心龍虎榜) - Top 20 Favorite Songs of 2018 #19
- 2018 Global Chinese Golden Chart Awards - Top 20 Songs of the Year

=== International awards ===
- Germany's 2020 iF DESIGN AWARD - Communication
