= Irreplaceable (EP) =

EP by S.H.E
- Released: August 26, 2016
- Genre: Pop
- Length: 21:40
- Language: Mandarin
- Label: HIM International Music
- Producer: Bing Wang

S.H.E chronology
Blossomy (2012)	Irreplaceable (2016)

Singles from Irreplaceable
- 1. "Irreplaceable" Released: August 11, 2016

Irreplaceable (Chinese: 永遠都在) is the first extended play by the Taiwanese girl group S.H.E. It was released on August 26, 2016, by HIM International Music. The EP was commemorating for 15th anniversary of S.H.E's debut.

== Reception ==
The track "Irreplaceable" is listed at number 44 on the Hit FM Top 100 Singles of the Year chart for 2016. The album is the 4th best selling album in Taiwan in 2016, with 45,000 copies sold. The album also received the Top 10 Selling Mandarin Albums of the Year in the IFPI Hong Kong Album Sales Awards 2016.

== Music videos ==
The music video for "Different Ways" was uploaded on May 24, 2016. The video for "Irreplaceable" was released on August 11, which was directed by Bill Chia and Bounce.

== Promotion and live performances ==
S.H.E held a Reunion One in One 15th Anniversary Special Exhibition in Songshan Cultural and Creative Park, Taipei, from August 26, 2016, to September 19, 2016.

== Track listing ==
Irreplaceable track listing
No.	Title	Lyrics	Music	Arrangement	Length
1.	"Irreplaceable" (永遠都在)	Derek Shih, Roberto	Rosan, Roberto	Geo	4:22
2.	"Forget to Forget about You" (忘記把你忘記)	Wu Hsiung	Anan Zuo	Terence Teo	5:04
3.	"Too Much" (Too Much)	Yao Chien	Tanya Chua	Martin Tang	3:07
4.	"Don't" (別)	Wu Hsiung	Judy Chen, Ian Chen, Chen Cheng Ching	Jason Huang	4:37
5.	"Different Ways" (殊途)	Lan Xiao Xie	Zheng Nan	Jerry C	3:52
Total length:					21:40
