= Together (S.H.E album) =

- Together cover

Compilation album by S.H.E
- Released: 23 January 2003
- Genre: Mandopop
- Length: 64:49
- Language: Mandarin
- Label: HIM International Music
- Producer: Yuan Wei Jen

S.H.E chronology
Genesis 美麗新世界 (2002)	Together (2003)	Super Star (2003)

Together is the first compilation album by Taiwanese Mandopop girl group S.H.E. It was released on 23 January 2003 by HIM International Music between their third studio album Genesis and fourth Super Star. This album has four new songs plus one VCD.

== Track listing ==
=== CD ===
Bold are new songs.

1. Always on My Mind (cover of; Sweetbox - Read My Mind)
2. White Love Song (白色戀歌) (cover of; No Angels - Come Back)
3. When the Angels Sing (天使在唱歌, Tian Shi Zai Chang Ge) (cover of; No Angels - When The Angels Sing)
4. I Have a Date with Blessedness (我和幸福有約定, Wo He Xin Fu You Yue Ding) - 4:50
5. Beauty up My Life - 2:57
6. Not Yet Lovers (戀人未滿, Lian Ren Wei Man) (cover of; Destiny's Child - Brown Eyes) 4:38
7. Genesis (美麗新世界, Mei Li Xin Shi Jie) - 4:29
8. Tropical Rain Forest (熱帶雨林, Re Dai Yu Lin) - 4:43
9. Remember - 3:04
10. Where's Love (愛呢, Ai Ne) - 3:47
11. Belief - 4:33
12. Watch Me Shine - 3:21
13. Fridge (冰箱, Bing Xiang) - 4:29
14. Are You All Right (妳還好不好, Ni Hai Hao Bu Hao) - 4:47
15. Ocean of Love (愛情的海洋, Ai Qing De Hai Yang) - 3:55
16. Requirement of Loving Me (愛我的資格, Ai Wo De Zi Ge) - 4:32

=== DVD ===
The Memoir of the Early Time + 4 music videos.
