= Blossomy =

- Beautiful Life edition cover

Studio album by S.H.E
- Released: November 16, 2012
- Recorded: July–November 2012
- Genre: Mandopop
- Length: 41:40
- Language: Mandarin
- Label: HIM International Music
- Producer: S.H.E

S.H.E chronology
Shero (2010)	Blossomy (2012)	Irreplaceable (2016)

Alternative cover
- Beautiful Together edition cover

Singles from Blossomy
- 1. "Blossomy" Released: October 22, 2012; 2. "Warm Heart" Released: November 14, 2012

Blossomy (Chinese: 花又開好了) is the eleventh studio album (thirteenth overall) by the Taiwanese girl group S.H.E. It was released on November 16, 2012, by HIM International Music, two years after their last album, Shero (2010). It was their first album since member Selina Ren sustained serious burn injuries in an accident while shooting a drama.

== Release ==
The title track "Blossomy" (花又開好了) was first broadcast on Hit FM on October 22, 2012. The full version was released on October 24, 2012. Its accompanying music video was broadcast on seven Taiwanese news channels.

== Commercial performance ==
The album is the sixth best-selling album in Taiwan in 2012. The tracks "Blossomy" (花又開好了), "Warm Heart" (心還是熱的) and "The Innocent Women" (像女孩的女人) are listed at number 5, 38 and 57 respectively on the Hit FM Top 100 Singles of the Year chart for 2012.

== Track listing ==
Blossomy – Standard edition
No.	Title	Lyrics	Music	Arrangement	Length
1.	"迫不及待" (Can Not Wait)	Lan Xiao Xie	JYKEN	JerryC	4:02
2.	"花又開好了" (Blossomy)	Ashin, Nan Gua	West Loft (Leon)	JerryC	4:16
3.	"不說再見" (Never Say Goodbye)	S.H.E	S.H.E	Alex Chang Chien, You Cheng Hao	4:15
4.	"心還是熱的" (Warm Heart)	Daryl Yao	Jerry C	Jerry C	3:52
5.	"親愛的樹洞" (Dear Tree Hole)	Lan Xiao Xie	Dean Ting	Dato Chang	4:55
6.	"還我" (Repair Me)	Hsu Min Ling	Liu Yin	JerryC	4:19
7.	"明天的自己" (A Brand New Me)	Daryl Yao	Salsa Chen	Bing Wang	4:02
8.	"那時候的樹" (That Tree)	Greeny Wu	Greeny Wu	Dato Chang	4:41
9.	"像女孩的女人" (The Innocent Women)	Wang Cheng Sheng	Joeloe Kuo	Yao Hung, Phil Wen	4:09
10.	"後來後來" (After That)	Hsu Min Ling	Little White Kang	JerryC	4:10
Total length:					41:40

Blossomy – DVD
No.	Title	Length
1.	"Shero"
2.	"我愛雨夜花 (I Love Rainy Night Flower)"
3.	"愛就對了 (Love So Right)"
4.	"你不會 (You Won't Be)"
5.	"愛上你 (Loving You)"
6.	"兩個人的荒島 (Desert Island)"

== Charts ==
=== Weekly charts ===
Chart (2012)	Peak position
Taiwanese Albums (G-Music)	1

=== Year-end charts ===
Chart (2012)	Position
Taiwanese Albums (Note: Best-selling albums of the year in Taiwan as reported by media outlets)	5
