= Magical Journey =

- Magical version cover

Studio album by S.H.E
- Released: February 6, 2004
- Recorded: 2003–2004
- Genre: Mandopop
- Length: 42:18
- Label: HIM International Music
- Producer: Joeloe Kuo (郭文宗); Ichiro (古裕淼)

S.H.E chronology
Super Star (2003)	Magical Journey (2004)	Encore安可; Encore (2004)

Magical Journey (Chinese: 奇幻旅程; pinyin: Qíhuàn Lǚchéng) is the fifth studio album by Taiwanese girl group S.H.E. It was released on February 6, 2004. The album was released simultaneously in two versions: the "Magical" version and the "Journey" version. The miniature diorama featured on the Magical Version's cover was created in collaboration with the Miniatures Museum of Taiwan.

On the Journey Version's cover, HIM International Music (HIM) rented a bus. To commemorate S.H.E's trip to Hokkaidō, Japan to film the music video for the song "He Still Doesn't Understand" (他還是不懂), the Magical Version featured 50-minute VCD while the Journey Version featured a 24-page photobook.

== Music videos ==
The video for "He Still Can't Understand" is based on unrequited love, with dialogue in Japanese, Korean and Mandarin. Both "Five Days and Four Nights" and "The Journey of Us From the Beginning" are based on themes of friendship. The former video is a series of experiences in which the members of S.H.E are enjoying themselves; the latter video is a story of three girls on a road trip. The car breaks down, so the girls look for help. During their search, they get hungry, and eventually approach a man to trade two coffees for an ice cream cone. At the end of the video, a cyclist eventually helps the girls by towing the car with his bicycle. "A Safe Sense" is the story of a boy who is all too careful about his environment, and goes to nuns for help. However, the nuns are arrested by the police at the end of the video.

== Track listing ==
No.	Title	Lyrics	Music	Notes	Length
1.	"Persian Cat" ("波斯貓")	Wu Hsiung	Bing Wang		4:02
2.	"Ten-Sided Ambush" ("十面埋伏")	Derek Shih	J.Wu		4:04
3.	"He Still Can't Understand" ("他還是不懂")	Jennifer Hsu	Bing Wang		4:16
4.	"Only Lonely"	Yu Guang Zhong	JD Souther	Cover of You're Only Lonely by JD Souther	4:00
5.	"Can't Find It" ("找不到")	Zakky	Funck		3:58
6.	"Five Days, Four Nights" ("五天四夜")	Daryl Yao	Jason Zhang		4:15
7.	"A Safe Sense" ("安全感")	Derek Shih	Bing Wang		4:24
8.	"Never Mind"	Wyman Wong	Tso An-an		4:47
9.	"The Story Of Romeo And Juliet" ("茱羅記")	Daryl Yao	Li Tien Lung		4:51
10.	"The Journey of Us From the Beginning" ("一起開始的旅程")	Derek Shih	Neo Ivy		4:03
Total length:					42:40

== Charts ==
=== Weekly charts ===
Chart (2004)	Peak position
Malaysian Albums (RIM)	2
Singaporean Albums (RIAS)	3

== Sales ==
Region	Certification	Certified units/sales
Asia	—	2,000,000
