= S.H.E =

Taiwanese girl group

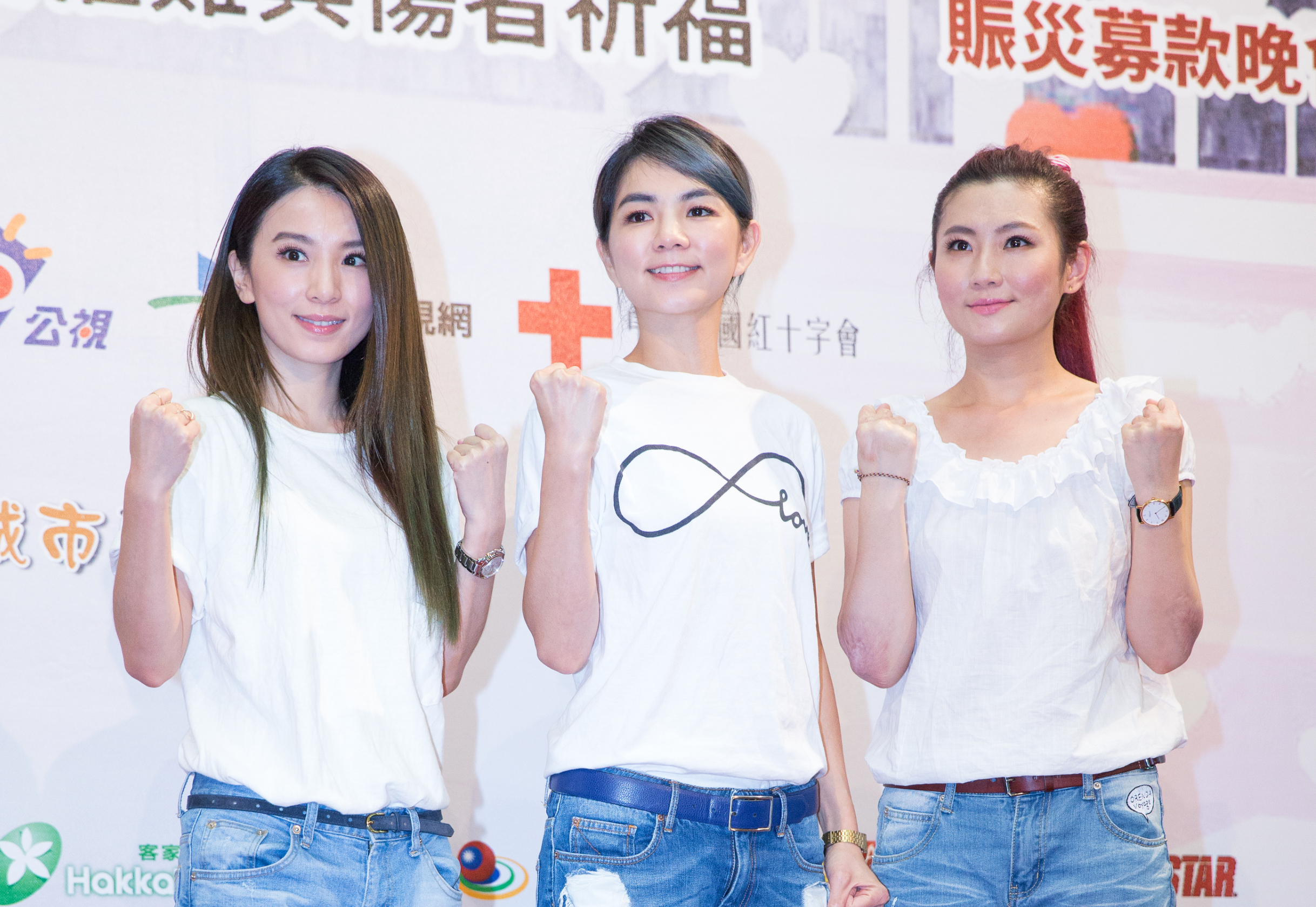
- S.H.E in 2014; L-R: Hebe Tien, Ella Chen, and Selina Jen

Background information
- Also known as: 女朋友 (pinyin: Nǚ Péngyǒu; lit. 'Girl Friends')
- Origin: Taipei, Taiwan
- Genres: Mandopop; R&B; dance-pop; bubblegum pop
- Years active: 2001–present
- Label: HIM International Music
- Members: Selina Jen; Hebe Tien; Ella Chen
- Website: S.H.E HIM Official Site

S.H.E are a Taiwanese Mandopop girl group with members Selina Jen, Hebe Tien, and Ella Chen. They formed in 2001 under the management of HIM International Music but decided not to renew their contract in 2019, with members forming their own individual management companies.

S.H.E achieved commercial success in the 2000s and has remained active for more than a decade. Since releasing their debut album Girls' Dorm (2001), the group has recorded 13 albums with sales totaling more than 10 million, and set ticketing records in each of their two concert tours. They have also acted in seven drama series, hosted two variety shows, and contributed ten songs to six drama soundtracks.

== Career ==
=== 2001–2003: Pre-debut, Girls Dorm, Youth Co., Ltd., Genesis, Together and Super Star ===
Before releasing S.H.E's first album, HIM International focused on the group's chemistry, and assigned the three girls to live together in a dormitory room. Selina revealed in 2009 that their English names were also changed to fit the group name. Selina named herself Cola, Hebe was called Anita, while Ella called herself Water pre-debut.

S.H.E released their debut album Girls' Dorm on September 11, 2001; the album title stems from the memories of the group members of their prior living quarters. The album experienced commercial success despite being released on the same day as the September 11 attacks, selling 150,000 copies in Taiwan and 750,000 copies throughout Asia. On January 29, 2002, S.H.E's second album, Youth Society, was released and went on to sell more than 250,000 copies and over 1.25 million in Asia. With the release of this album, S.H.E Girl Friends underwent a name change and became simply S.H.E. The trio's third album, Genesis, was released on August 5, 2002, approximately six months after Youth Society. Continuing the successes of the group's previous albums, 20,000 copies of Genesis were ordered in advance of the release date. The album would go on to sell 180,000 copies and over 1.75 million in Asia. S.H.E later signed an endorsement deal with N-age, a South Korean online game company. Not only did N-age appear in a couple of music videos, but they also sponsored S.H.E's first major concert in Tainan City, the N-age Genesis Concert, which attracted over 20,000 fans. On January 23, 2003, S.H.E released Together, their first compilation album which sold over 2 million copies.

S.H.E's fourth album was intended for release on August 6, but due to Ella experiencing an injury,^{[a]} Super Star arrived in stores on August 22, 2003. The album featured the group's first pop/rock song, "Super Star", which, for ten consecutive weeks, placed no lower than fourth on Singapore's YES 933 music charts selling more than 2.75 million copies. To date, Together and Super Star have combined to sell 580,000 copies; 250,000 copies of Super Star were sold in Taiwan alone.

=== 2004–2005: Magical Journey, Fantasy Land World Tour and Once Upon a Time ===
On February 6, 2004, S.H.E released their fifth album, Magical Journey, in two different versions: a Magical Version and a Journey Version. The two versions combined to sell 2.5 million copies in Asia, including 160,000 copies in Taiwan alone. On June 2, S.H.E and HIM International agreed to extend the trio's contract, which would have expired in October 2005. Later that year, on September 4, 2004, S.H.E began their first major tour, the Fantasy Land Tour. The tour started in Taipei, where more than 25,000 attendees were present, and ended in Genting Highlands, Malaysia. During their concert at the Hongkou Stadium, the trio set an attendance record. The tour raked in NT$22.4 million in gate receipts. The release of S.H.E's sixth album, Encore, was pushed to November 12, 2004, to accommodate Selina's graduation from university in late November. Encore sold two million units in Asia within one week of its release; since then, that number has surpassed 2 million. By the time Encore was due for release, media outlets had already begun labelling S.H.E as "The Number One Girl Group" (Chinese: 女子第一天團).^{[b]}

S.H.E had released albums every few months until the end of 2004. However, due to their busy concert schedule, it was over a year until their next album appeared. After releasing Encore, they contributed to the Reaching for the Stars soundtrack, which sold only 50,000 copies. That same year, the girl group Twins released their first Mandarin album, Trainee Cupid, in the Taiwanese market. That album would sell 800,000 copies in two months. The poor sales of the soundtrack and the success of the Twins album led to this period being described as one of the lowest times of S.H.E's career. On November 25, 2005, the trio finally released their seventh album, Once Upon a Time. The album not only set a record with 50,000 pre-orders, but it sold more than two million copies, overshadowing Trainee Cupid. Once Upon a Time debuted on the G-music Chinese language album charts at #1, retained that position for four consecutive weeks, and stayed on the charts for a total of 13 weeks. The album's title track, "Don't Wanna Grow Up" (Chinese: 不想長大),^{[c]} won Song of the Year at Hong Kong’s TVB8 Awards.

=== 2006–2007: Forever, The Moving Castle World Tour and Play ===
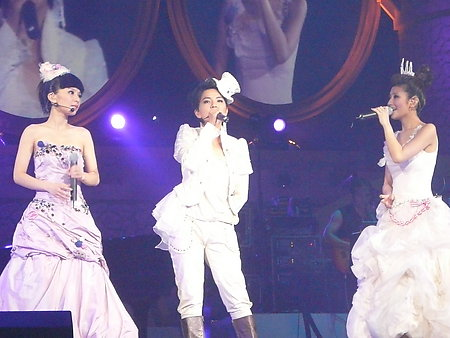
S.H.E in 2006

On July 21, 2006, S.H.E released a second compilation album, Forever, which sold over 150,000 copies within a week. The album featured five new songs, a compilation of older works, and three songs from older drama soundtracks. Forever included many collaborative works with other artists in the Taiwanese pop music industry. C-pop megastar Jay Chou composed "Electric Shock" (Chinese: 觸電) for the album. The song "Solo Madrigal" (Chinese: 獨唱情歌) was a duet between Selina and Tank, the latter of whom had originally recorded the song for his debut album. For the Tokyo Juliet soundtrack, Hebe and boyband Fahrenheit sang "Only Have Feelings for You" (Chinese: 只對你有感覺), which won several awards including Taiwan's Best Duet Song at the 2006 Sprite China Music Awards.

S.H.E's second major concert tour, The Moving Castle world tour, commenced on July 8, 2006, in Shanghai. After their The Moving Castle world tour in Hong Kong, which was recorded and released as the group's second live album, S.H.E was commended for their perseverance, amount of dance preparation, and ability to hit their notes. Within the tour's first five months, the group attracted over 200,000 fans, and collected NT$200 million in gate receipts. On April 18, S.H.E signed on with WOW Music to improve their presence in Hong Kong. Play, the trio's eighth album, was released on May 11, 2007, and was the first S.H.E album released under the new distribution label. Play went double gold within the first four days of the album's pre-order period; by June 5, more than 150,000 copies were sold. A month after Play's release, S.H.E was nominated for the Most Popular Female Artist award at the 18th Golden Melody Awards but lost to pop diva Jolin Tsai.

=== 2008–2009: FM S.H.E, Map of Love, S.H.E is the One concert and Shero ===
On 23 September 2008, S.H.E released their ninth album, FM S.H.E. On this album, members of the band take on the role of radio hosts, and the album itself is interspersed with radio station-esque snippets. The album had a pre-order sale of 42,000 copies in Taiwan and over 1.2 million in Asia. An online radio station, FM S.H.E, was also set up for a month in line with the album where there will be different programs being broadcast every day. The viewership of the online radio hit a record high of 100,000 views.

In June 2009, S.H.E released their first digital album, Map of Love, in China, which will only be digitally released on internet music stores. The album consists of 10 songs, of which 8 songs are from their previous albums and 2 new songs, 鎖住時間 "(Lock Up the Time)" and 可愛萬歲 "(Long Live Adorableness)". On 16 October 2009, S.H.E commenced their third world tour, S.H.E is the One concert, with Hong Kong being their first stop. The tickets to the Hong Kong concert were sold out within a few days and this concert had received positive reviews. As of 2010, the concert is still ongoing with more stops to be made. On 26 March 2010, S.H.E released their tenth album, Shero. The album received positive reviews, with 50,000 copies being pre-ordered in Taiwan before it was released.

=== 2010–2018: Selina's injury, Blossomy and second hiatus ===
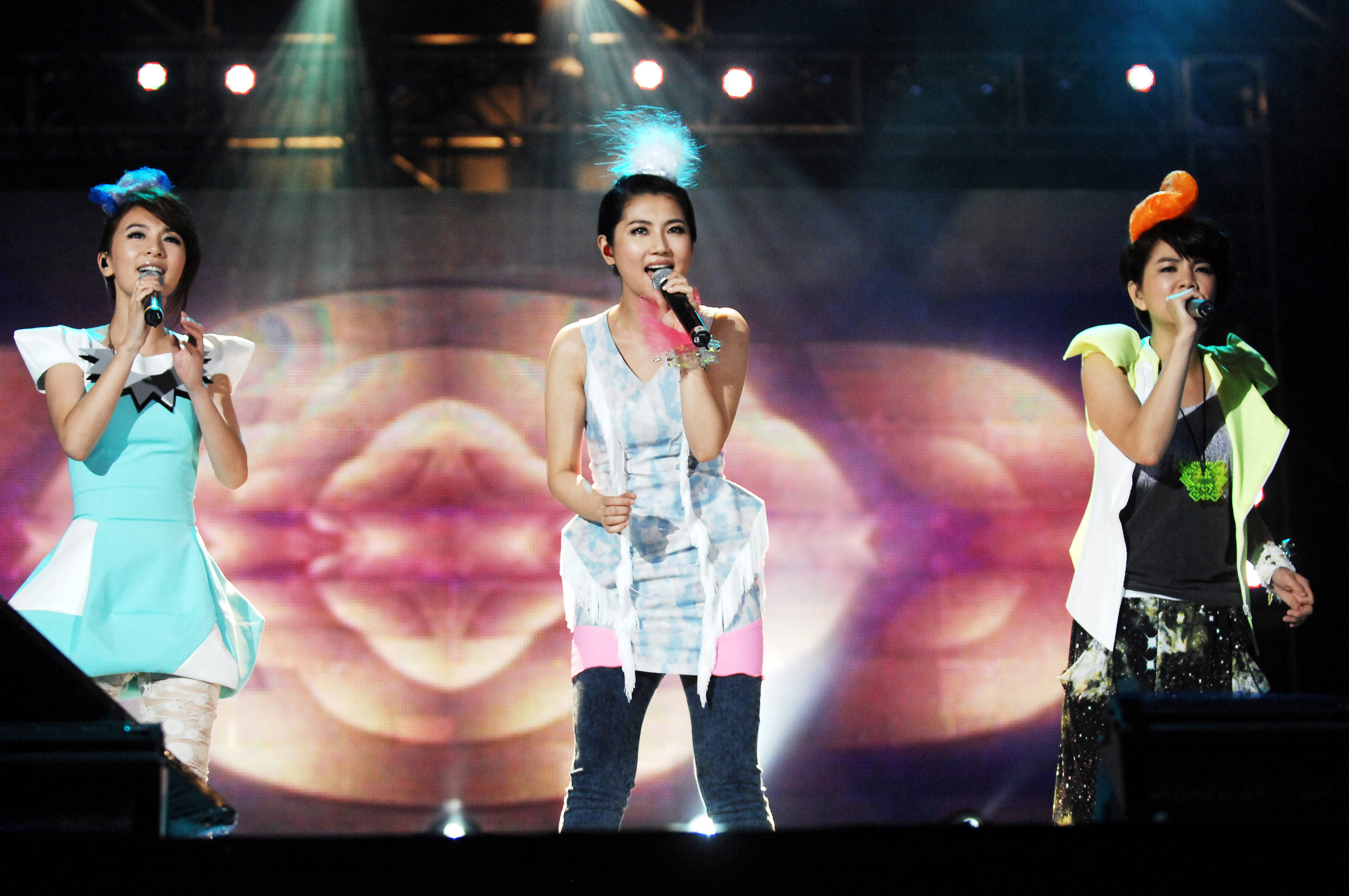
S.H.E on October 17, 2010

On October 22, 2010, Selina suffered third degree burns on 54% of her body, mostly her back and legs, during an indoor film shooting in Shanghai for musical movie "I have a date with Spring (我和春天有个约会)". On January 19, 2011, after Selina was hospitalized for two months and discharged, the trio held a press conference to formally address their fans about Selina's injury and her recovery. In May 2011, Shero, nominated the 22nd Golden Melody Awards's "Top vocal group award". In June 2012, S.H.E performed on the 23rd Golden Melody Awards and declared regression. On October 11, 2012, S.H.E declared renewal and became one of the main shareholders of HIM International Music. Blossomy, their eleventh album, was released on November 16, 2012.

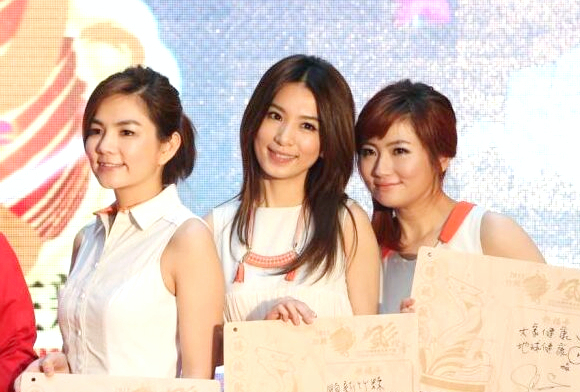
S.H.E in 2013

Since 2014, the group entered their second hiatus. In 2016, they were immortalized with wax figures in Shanghai's Madame Tussands, and then on August 26, issued an extended play "Irreplaceable", and one of the songs "Irreplaceable" in the EP was commemorating for 15th anniversary of S.H.E's debut, after that held "S.H.E 15th Anniversary Exhibition" at Songshan Cultural and Creative Park in Taipei from August 26 to September 19, 2016. In 2017, S.H.E. returned with a full 16-cassette set of all albums (including 12 full albums and 2 compilation mini-albums) called "S.H.E's in style" on their 16th anniversary.

As of April 2018, Ella is the vocal instructor for Produce 101 China. Ella’s contract has ended with the record label and announced to be not re-contracting on July 10, 2018, with plans of creating her own management company with her husband, however, the group will not disband and continue doing projects as the management will still cooperate with Ella. On August 30, 2018, a digital single "Seventeen" was released by S.H.E, it was commemorating for 17th anniversary of S.H.E's debut, and the single was issued by form of digital music download, after that held "S.H.E 17th Anniversary Concert" to celebrate the 17th anniversary of S.H.E's debut at Liberty Square in Taipei on September 11, 2018. On September 30, 2018, HIM International Music officially announce that S.H.E will no longer be managed by them. After ending the 17 years collaboration with HIM International Music, three of them had come up with their management agencies individually.

=== 2019-present: Various reunions ===
In January 2019, they reunited for children’s charity event and made donations to the child poverty charity before Chinese New Year. On June 29, 2019, they reunited again for The 30th Golden Melody Awards as guests and presented awards for Best Group and Best Band. On September 28, 2020, they made a reunion during the Taipei leg of Hebe's individual One After Another Tour. On August 11, 2023, Selina and Ella as Hebe's One After Another Tour guests. On September 11, 2023, celebrating S.H.E 22nd anniversary through Selina's podcast (Episode 46).

== Musical style ==
"So long as you're happy" (你快樂我隨意)
From Genesis (2002). This is the first S.H.E song to feature contributions by a member of the group (Hebe), and the first to mix pop music with rap. It was not until Magical Journey (2004) that pop/rap combinations became a staple of S.H.E albums.

"Super Star"
From Super Star (2003). Most of S.H.E's pop/rock songs, including "Super Star", were produced by Roberto "Geo" Rosan of Sweetbox. Although songs in this genre are a rarity, they have combined for 6 Best Annual Singles awards.

S.H.E's oxalis (centre), as it appears on Forever. The oxalis, a type of clover, is found on every album cover with varying designs.

S.H.E has released eleven studio albums to date, including three compilation albums and one which is only digitally released. All of S.H.E's album covers display an oxalis, the symbol for the group. On some covers, the clover is easy to spot on the front (Girls Dorm, Together, Encore, Forever, Play) or on the back (FM S.H.E); on other covers, its appearance is more subtle (Super Star, Once Upon a Time). S.H.E's other contributions include songs in the soundtracks of Magical Love, The Rose, Reaching for the Stars, Tokyo Juliet, The Little Fairy, Hanazakarino Kimitachihe, and Bull Fighting. In 2008, they sang the ending theme for the film CJ7.

The group is also known for harmonizing between each other, but has no designated lead singer and has no leader. All three members have different vocal ranges to complement each other. Ella sings within the alto to mezzo-soprano range, while Hebe and Selina sing within the mezzo-soprano to soprano range, with Ella having the widest vocal range of the three.^{[d]}

Most S.H.E songs fall into the category of pop music. Songs from this genre consist of light melodies, simple drum beats, and the occasional piano or synthesizer accompaniment. In Girls Dorm and Youth Society, acoustic guitar melody lines were used as well. While some slower songs, particularly those in Genesis, fall into the genre of R&B, high-tempo songs, such as "Beauty Up My Life", focus more on techno. S.H.E has also sung a few pop/rock songs, including "Piquancy" (Chinese: 痛快), "Super Star", and "Star Light" (Chinese: 星光). As their career progressed, S.H.E began mixing light-hearted pop ballads with elements of hip hop and dance. Attempts to fuse these genres started with songs such as "If You're Happy, Then I'll Be Pleased" (Chinese: 你快樂我隨意), which contained a short rap segment, and evolved into songs such as "Listen to Yuan Wei Jen Play Guitar" (Chinese: 聽袁惟仁彈吉他), which is composed entirely of rap with the exception of the chorus.

=== Lyrics ===
Shi Rencheng (Chinese: 施人誠) serves as the group's main lyricist since the group's debut. Between the releases of Magical Journey and Forever, Daryl Yao (Chinese: 姚若龍; pinyin: Yáo Ruòlóng) was a regular contributor as well.^{[e]} The lyrics of Jay Chou's main lyricist, Vincent Fang, have also made numerous appearances.^{[f]} On some occasions, S.H.E members even contributed their own lyrics. Hebe wrote the words for "Say You Love Me" (Chinese: 說你愛我) and "Too Late" (Chinese: 來不及), and penned the rap portion of "So Long as You're Happy". Selina was responsible for the lyrics of "Silenced" (Chinese: 安靜了). Ella wrote the lyrics "Wife"(Chinese:老婆). They wrote the lyrics "Don't say goodbye"(Chinese:不说再见)

=== Covers ===
"When You're Only Lonely" (1979)
The original country-style ballad by JD Souther

"Only Lonely" (2004)
S.H.E's rendition of the Southern original, now infused with elements of bubblegum pop and rap.

S.H.E's albums contain a significant number of cover songs. A substantial portion of the group’s recorded songs are cover versions. Earlier albums often included cover songs; however, since 2004, the group has recorded no more than two covers per album. In most covers, the songs' original titles were kept. Other songs, such as Westlife's "Soledad", were simply given new Chinese titles. The lyrics are usually rewritten, but some songs, such as Charlene's "I've Never Been To Me", are sung in their original English. While the musical style is usually maintained, some covers, such as "Only Lonely" and "I.O.I.O", have a lighter, bubblegum pop feel.

Older pieces and nursery rhymes are occasionally parodied. "Don't Wanna Grow Up" is a parody of Mozart's 40th Symphony, and "London Bridge is Falling Down" (Chinese: 倫敦大橋垮下來) is based on the children's song of the same name. The verses of "Thanks for Your Gentleness" (Chinese: 謝謝你的溫柔) are original compositions, but the chorus is borrowed from Mayday's "Gentle and Soft". S.H.E's covers have received less critical acclaim than their original works. During the group's career, original compositions have combined for nearly 20 awards, whereas covers have been lauded only twice.^{[g]}

== Television and film career ==
From late 2001 to early 2002, Hebe and Ella acted in the drama, Magical Love. Ella starred as Juliet, a recent high school graduate who is constantly looking for her Romeo. Hebe portrayed the secondary role of Sha Sha, Juliet's self-conscious and assertive friend. Selina was absent because she was studying at the National Taiwan Normal University. The songs "Remember" and "Belief" was used as the drama's opening and ending themes, respectively. In February, S.H.E signed on to be co-hosts on Jacky Wu's show, Guess Guess Guess. During S.H.E's tenure on the show, ratings averaged over 3.5, regularly putting the show in the top 10 for weekend shows. S.H.E stopped hosting Guess Guess Guess in July. In April 2003, the trio guest-hosted two episodes of the Taiwanese variety show, Happy Sunday, before signing on as co-hosts in May. However, during S.H.E's Happy Sunday tenure, at the height of the SARS epidemic, Hebe exhibited fever-like symptoms while coming home from Singapore. Since Ella was living with Hebe at the time, both were forced into quarantine for 10 days, leaving Selina as the only one in the group who could host the television show Happy Sunday.

All three S.H.E members appeared in the drama, The Rose, where Ella starred as Zheng Bai He, a girl suffering from low self-esteem. Selina played two secondary roles: her first character, Zhuang Zhe Qin, was a beautiful yet frail girl with a heartwarming personality. Her second character, Di Ya Man, is Qin's doppelganger with an arrogant and domineering personality. Hebe portrayed Xiao Feng, a girl who quietly pursues Han Kui but Kui is infatuated with Bai He. In spite of the high costs, The Rose was the highest rated television drama in its time slot. At the 2004 Golden Bell Awards, which are presented by the GIO to honour the year's best television programs, The Rose was crowned Most Popular Drama. S.H.E sang "Flowers Have Blossomed" (Chinese: 花都開好了) for the drama's soundtrack. The song not only debuted at #1 on the UFO Music Charts, but it also stayed on the YES 93.3 charts for ten weeks, holding the #1 position for two consecutive weeks.

On July 29, 2003, Ella performed a stunt as part of S.H.E's Happy Sunday segment. The stunt, which involved jumping off different floors of a building, was part of a public service video that explained proper fire escape procedures. On her first attempt, Ella followed protocol, jumped off the second floor of a building, and landed safely. On her second attempt, she was asked to jump off the third floor. However, as she jumped off, Ella became nervous and failed to follow the safety procedures correctly, leading to her falling on a fire escape from twenty feet and shattering her hip. Paramedics transported her to the Neihu Tri-Service General Hospital before being redirected to the National Taiwan University Hospital. Ella was released from the hospital after a 23-day stay, but she went home to Pingtung for five months in order to recuperate. In spite of this incident, the Japan National Tourist Organization, who had admired S.H.E's hosting abilities, asked Happy Sunday to promote Japanese tourism. As a result, Selina and Hebe hosted "Yokoso! Japan", a special Happy Sunday segment that explored numerous facets of Japanese culture. In January 2004, Ella appeared in the final two episodes of "Yokoso! Japan". However, during the segment's four-episode run, producers were already searching for S.H.E's replacements, and ultimately chose Taiwanese singer Phil Chang. S.H.E discontinued hosting Happy Sunday once they began promoting the album Magical Journey.

Selina and Hebe, along with 28 other celebrities, were cast for the three-episode drama series Happy New Year 2004. In February, both S.H.E members co-starred in the movie, A Disguised Superstar (Chinese: 冒牌天皇), with Miriam Yeung; in April, Hebe acted as the female love interest in the first episode of Say Yes Enterprise (Chinese: 求婚事務所). The episode would earn a rating of 1.93, placing third behind My Secret Garden II (Chinese: 我的秘密花園II) and Snow Angel (Chinese: 雪天使). In October 2005, all three members of S.H.E starred in the drama, Reaching for the Stars,^{[h]} and sang its opening theme, "Star Light". The drama focused on the fate of an electronics company whose chairman had just died. Selina played the role of Zhou Xinlei, the chairman's spoiled but good-natured daughter. Ella starred as Ren Jie, a clever girl who assumed the identity of the company's heiress to save her brother. Hebe portrayed Shen Xiaorou, a strong-willed policewoman who lives with her ailing grandmother. Reaching for the Stars had the misfortune of airing its pilot episode during the final episode of The Prince Who Turns into a Frog. While the average rating for the pilot episode of Reaching for the Stars was 1.17, the final episode of The Prince Who Turns into a Frog set a 2005 record for highest average episode rating (6.93) and highest episode rating (11.35). In the end, despite heavy investment in the series' production, Reaching for the Stars had only achieved mediocre television ratings. Nevertheless, Ella was nominated for Best Actress at the 2006 Golden Bell Awards.

In the spring of 2006, Ella pursued her own on-screen interests and was cast for the lead female role of a Taiwanese idol drama, which was scheduled to air later that year. In January 2007, Selina and Hebe signed half-year contracts to be the co-hosts of Guess Guess Guess, the show that they had hosted five years earlier. The drama starring Ella, Hanazakarino Kimitachihe, finally began airing in November, and continued until its finale on March 4, 2007. Ella was featured as Lu Ruixi, an American tomboy who transfers schools so she can see her high jump idol every day. During its 15-episode run, the drama never relinquished its ratings crown. S.H.E sang the song, "What to Do?" (Chinese: 怎麽辦) as the drama's opening theme. In June 2007, SET TV selected Hebe to star in Bull Fighting as the daughter of the man who owns 13th Street. S.H.E sang "How Have You Been Lately?" (Chinese: 你最近還好嗎) as the drama's ending theme.

In the movie CJ7, S.H.E sang one of its OST entitled "Qi Zai". In May 2009, Ella was cast for the lead female role for the Taiwanese idol drama, Down With Love (就想賴著妳). The drama was aired on January 31, 2010. In the drama, Ella was featured as Yang Guo, kind-natured and innocent. When met with any kind of unlucky circumstances, she would always find a way to encourage and spur herself on, adopting a bright and optimistic outlook. S.H.E sang the song, "Loving You" (traditional Chinese: 愛上你) as the drama's ending theme. In May 2010, Selina was invited as a guest host for the 700th episode of 'Guess Guess Guess' special edition, along with Jacky Wu. From July 24, 2010, onwards, Selina would be co-hosting 'Guess Guess Guess' with Halem Yu, with changes made to the television programme.

On October 22, 2010. Selina was seriously injured during an accident on the set of her new drama, I have a date with spring (我和春天有個約會) in Shanghai. She suffered from third-degree burns in 54% of her body. Her co-star Yu Haoming (俞灏明) was also seriously injured. On January 19, 2011, Selina had finally made her first appearance in the press conference at the hospital. Selina was thankful for the concern, care, and blessings from the public she was also grateful to the nurses who took care of her saying that they were like angels, and was happy that she finally got to leave the hospital and go back home.

== Influence and impact ==
=== Musical ===
By 2001, the vast majority of notable singing groups in Taiwan^{[j]} were male. When S.H.E was formed, other girl groups were only beginning to earn their fame in the Taiwanese music industry, but few would last more than two years. Formed in 2000, 4 in Love had similar success to S.H.E during their first year in the entertainment business, but broke up less than two years later. Among the former members of 4 in Love, Rainie Yang is the only member to have continued her singing career. Other groups, such as Walkie Talkie (Chinese: 錦繡二重唱), were formed as a result of talent competitions, but were less notable during the course of their careers. Over a year after S.H.E's formation, the state of girl groups in Taiwan had changed little. In January 2003, radio station UFM1003 released a list of its Top 10 Taiwanese Pop Groups for the year 2002. Although S.H.E was ranked first, they were the only all-female group on the list.

During the course of S.H.E's career, a significant number of musical groups were introduced by their companies as "the next S.H.E" with hopes of emulating their success. When Warner Music Taiwan wanted to form a three-person boy band, they planned on marketing them as "the male version of S.H.E" before coming up with the name "G-Boys". Some groups were formed to topple S.H.E's standing as Taiwan's premier pop group. Jungiery Star manager Sun Derong stated that 7 Flowers was formed just to provide competition for S.H.E. Despite the increase in competition, S.H.E maintains a definitive stranglehold on the Mandopop group awards, suggesting that the formation of these new groups has done little to ruffle the trio's feathers.

=== Endorsements ===
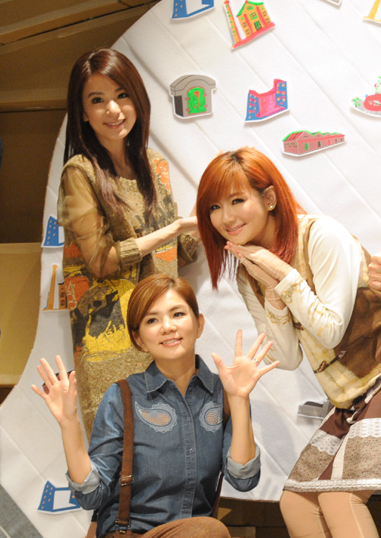
S.H.E in 2012

In 2001, S.H.E began promoting the first of many products, including those of Digimaster and beverage chain Fuzion Smoothie. Since then, the group has endorsed numerous companies, including Bausch & Lomb (2002–present), Coca-Cola (2004–present), and China Mobile (2006–present). One of S.H.E's more notable commercials was for World of Warcraft, where the girls were put into the context of a fantasy gaming world.

S.H.E regularly contributes songs for endorsement campaigns. The songs "Too Much" and "Beauty Up My Life", from their debut album Girls Dorm, were used in commercials for Sogo and Wacoal, respectively. "Genesis" (Chinese: 美麗新世界) and "Watch Me Shine", from the 2002 album Genesis, were used for N-age, a South Korean online game. "Piquancy", from 2004 album Encore, was used to promote the online game New Legendary Twins (Chinese: 新絕代雙嬌). In collaboration with Fahrenheit, S.H.E sang "Always Open" for 7-Eleven.

Companies frequently use S.H.E's music videos as advertising tools. The videos for "Genesis" and "Watch Me Shine" featured gameplay in N-age; "Excuse" (Chinese: 藉口) showed flashes of Inventec's OKWAP phones. Daphne (Chinese: 達芙妮女鞋), a Chinese shoe company, used the songs "Super Model", "Laurel Tree Goddess" (Chinese: 月桂女神), "Good Mood Just Be Yourself" (Chinese: 好心情Just Be Yourself), and "Miss Universe" (Chinese: 宇宙小姐) for their promotional campaigns. Top Girl, a Taiwan clothing company, had also used the song, "Girls' Be Strong" (Chinese: 女孩當自強) from FM S.H.E for their promotional campaigns.

=== Other ===
According to Baidu's year-end Top Search Terms survey, the most-searched movie of 2004 was House of Flying Daggers (Chinese: 十面埋伏). The phrase logged more than 1.2 million searches, which was nearly twice as many as second place (Kung Fu Hustle). Baidu attributed this difference to the fact that S.H.E had released a song with the same name earlier that year. As a result, searches for the song were lumped together with the movie, thereby inflating the latter's search totals.

S.H.E has also influenced television dramas, education systems, and even business operations. In the I Not Stupid Too television series, Chengcai, the wushu-practicing protagonist, was courted by three members of the school's chess society: Shirley, Helen, and Elaine, who were collectively known as S.H.E. On a 2005 secondary school English examination, S.H.E was the subject of a reading comprehension passage that mentioned their involvement with CCTV's annual Spring Festival Evening show. Cliff Wu, the president of Teradata's Greater China operations, was so amazed at how S.H.E affected his teenage daughters that he borrowed the group's name and transformed it into an acronym, summarizing the three main elements of Teradata's plan for entering the Chinese market. S represents "Strategy", while H and E represent "Human" and "Execution".

== Discography ==
- Girls' Dorm (2001)
- Youth Society (2002)
- Genesis (2002)
- Together (2003)
- Super Star (2003)
- Magical Journey (2004)
- Encore (2004)
- Once Upon a Time (2005)
- Forever (2006)
- Play (2007)
- FM S.H.E (2008)
- Shero (2010)
- Blossomy (2012)

== Concerts ==
- Fantasy Land World Tour (2004–2006)
- Perfect 3 World Tour (2006–2009)
- S.H.E is the One World Tour (2009–2010)
- 2gether 4ever World Tour (2013–2014)

== Biography ==
Title	Chinese	Author	Publishing Date	Publisher
So Young!	真青春!	Huang Ziming^{[*]}	September 15, 2002	Jie Bi Books
S.H.E Daybook	S.H.E時光日記簿	S.H.E	January 17, 2003	Ping Zhuang Ben (平裝本)
S.H.E's Crazy Battle Vol. 1	S.H.E瘋狂大作戰 第1彈	Bill Chia	July 1, 2004	Crown Publishing
Travel Along With Me	跟我一起去旅行	S.H.E	July 26, 2004	Taiwan Television Culture (台視文化)
Selina Loves Beading	Selina愛的小珠珠	Selina Jen	September 25, 2006	Ru He (如何)
S.H.E's Crazy Battle vol. 2	S.H.E瘋狂大作戰 第2彈	Bill Chia	September 12, 2008	
The 3 Spas of Love	爱的3温暖	S.H.E, Jiaozi	July 31, 2009	HIM International Music (華研國際音樂)

* Photographer.

== Notes ==
- a. See Television and film career.
- b. Searching "女子第一天團" with "S.H.E" on Chinese search engines yields only results written after the release of Encore.
- c. Although the English translations of the song and album are different, the Chinese names are the same (simplified Chinese: 不想长大; traditional Chinese: 不想長大; pinyin: Bù Xiǎng Zhǎng Dà).
- d. The article states that Ella is an alto, but there have been instances when Ella sings slightly above the alto range (i.e. into the mezzo soprano range) in songs such as "What to Do?" and "Don't Wanna Grow Up". Similarly, Hebe and Selina are listed in the article as sopranos, but there have been songs, such as "Persian Cat", where they sang notes more fitting for a mezzo-soprano.
- e. Yao wrote the lyrics for "Wisteria" (紫藤花), "A Vision Of Eternity" (一眼萬年), "I Love You" (我愛你) and "The Story of Romeo and Juliet" (茱羅記).
- f. Fang's lyrics are found in five songs: "Riverside Park" (河濱公園), "Norse Mythology" (北歐神話), "Laurel Goddess" (月桂女神), "Tropical Rainforest" (熱帶雨林), and "Migratory Bird" (侯鳥). The last two songs, which Fang co-produced with Jay Chou, are both Annual Best Singles (2002 and 2004, respectively).
- g. See List of awards and nominations received by S.H.E.
- h. The Chinese name for Reaching for the Stars, Zhen Ming Tian Nü (真命天女), is derived from the Chinese name for the group Destiny's Child, Tian Ming Zhen Nü (天命真女). Coincidentally, the plot of the drama revolves around three girls who seemed destined to meet each other.
- i. The magazine article refers to artists like Richie Ren (also mentioned in the article) as "talented types", while S.H.E qualified as an "idol type".
- j. The usage of "Taiwan" in this article, unless otherwise specified, refers to the Taiwanese music industry (as opposed to the music industries of China and Hong Kong).
- k. HIM announced the Xuite blog on April 20, 2007, initially as a countdown for the album Play.
