= Genesis (S.H.E album) =

Studio album by S.H.E
- Released: August 5, 2002
- Recorded: 2002
- Genre: Pop
- Length: 41:58
- Label: HIM International Music
- Producer: Joeloe Kuo

S.H.E chronology
Youth Society (2002)	Genesis (2002)	Together (2003)

Singles from Genesis
- 1. "Genesis" Released: August 5, 2002

Genesis (Chinese: 美麗新世界; pinyin: Měilì Xīn Shìjiè) is the third studio album by Taiwanese girl group S.H.E. It was released on August 5, 2002, by HIM International Music.

The track "Genesis" is listed at number 24 on the Hit FM Top 100 Singles of the Year chart for 2002.

== Background and release ==
Although the title track was an upbeat and lively number, S.H.E regarded it as their most difficult song at the time. While both Girls Dorm and Youth Society had songs that were sung entirely in English ("H.B.O" and "I've Never Been To Me", respectively), "Woman In Love", a cover of Rebekah Ryan's original in the Genesis album, would be the last English song that S.H.E would sing.

In April 2003, eight months after the release of Genesis, actress Chen Mingzhen's "Thinking of Your Moment" (想你的瞬間) covered the same Sweetbox song as "Ocean of Love" (愛情的海洋). According to Chen, she recorded "Thinking of Your Moment" one year before S.H.E had put it on Genesis, but the only reason S.H.E managed to sing "Ocean of Love" first was because Chen was delayed by manufacturing problems.

== Music videos ==
The Genesis karaoke VCD was the first to feature music videos for every track; the trend would continue for each subsequent album. Despite choreographing every music video, only one track, "Where's Love", featured something resembling a plot, which depicted Ella's sadness and nostalgia after breaking up with her boyfriend and Selina and Hebe attempting to comfort her. "Fascination" was the last music video made for the album's karaoke VCD because it consisted of footage from S.H.E's N-age Concert in Tainan.

== Track listing ==
Genesis – Standard edition
No.	Title	Lyrics	Music	Arrangement	Length
1.	"美麗新世界" (Genesis)	Li Tien Lung, Anson Yen	Li Tien Lung	David Lu	4:25
2.	"愛呢" (Where's Love)	Derek Shih	Roberto Rosan, Heiko Schmidt	BabyC	3:34
3.	"Watch Me Shine"	Jennifer Hsu	Dino Esposito	Kenn C	3:17
4.	"你快樂我隨意" (If you are happy, then I'll be pleased)	Kevin Yi, Hebe	J. Wu	J. Wu	3:42
5.	"愛情的海洋" (Ocean of Love)	Derek Shih	Heiko Schmidt, Roberto Geoman Rosan, Jade Villalon	Wu Ching Lung	3:51
6.	"無可取代" (Irreplaceable)	Kevin Yi, Pan Xie Qing	Pan Xie Qing	Michael Tu	4:49
7.	"Yes I Love You"	Derek Shih	Jung Yeon Jun	Michael Tu	4:49
8.	"Nothing Ever Changes"	Derek Shih	Mejlvang Jesper	Yao Hung	4:24
9.	"Woman in Love"	Barry Gibb, Robin Gibb	Barry Gibb, Robin Gibb	Ryan Lin	4:26
10.	"魔力" (Magic)	Daryl Yao	Chuang Li Fan	Michael Tu	4:41
Total length:					41:58

== Charts ==
=== Weekly charts ===
Chart (2002)	Peak position
Singaporean Albums (RIAS)	4

== Sales ==
Region	Certification	Certified units/sales
Taiwan	—	280,000
