= Sweetbox discography =

- Studio albums: 10
- Soundtrack albums: 1
- Live albums: 1
- Compilation albums: 13
- Singles: 29
- Video albums: 1

The discography of the German pop music project Sweetbox includes 10 studio albums, one live album, 13 compilation albums, and 29 singles.

== Studio albums ==
Title	Album details	Peak chart positions							Sales/Units	Certifications
Title	Album details	AUT	GER	JPN	KOR	NOR	SWE	SWI	Sales/Units	Certifications
Sweetbox	Released: March 6, 1998 (GER); Label: RCA, BMG; Format: CD, cassette	37	76	28	—	34	49	38	JPN: 400,000	RIAJ: 2× Platinum
Classified	Released: April 21, 2001 (GER); Label: Avex Entertainment; Format: CD, cassette	—	45	19	—	—	—	—	JPN: 200,000	RIAJ: Platinum
Jade	Released: September 26, 2002 (JPN); Label: Avex Entertainment, Paramedia; Format: CD, cassette	—	—	14	—	—	—	—	JPN: 100,000; KOR: 20,775	RIAJ: Gold
Adagio	Released: February 4, 2004 (JPN); Label: Avex Trax, Paramusic; Format: CD, cassette	—	—	10	—	—	—	—	JPN: 100,000; KOR: 29,250	RIAJ: Gold
After The Lights	Released: November 17, 2004 (JPN); Label: Avex Trax, Paramusic; Format: CD	—	—	35	—	—	—	—		
Addicted	Released: March 1, 2006 (JPN); Label: Avex Trax, Sony Music; Format: CD	—	—	7	—	—	—	—	JPN: 100,000; KOR: 17,999	RIAJ: Gold
The Next Generation	Released: June 10, 2009 (JPN); Label: Warner Music Japan, Sony Music, Paramusic; Format: CD, digital download	—	—	21	—	—	—	—		
Diamond Veil	Released: May 25, 2011 (JPN); Label: Warner Music Japan, Sony Music, Parasongs; Format: CD, digital download	—	—	46	17	—	—	—		
#Z21	Released: July 3, 2013 (JPN); Label: Sony Music; Format: CD, digital download	—	—	70	—	—	—	—		
Da Capo	Released: February 26, 2020 (JPN); Label: Avex Trax, Badclinic; Format: CD, digital download	—	—	—	—	—	—	—		
"—" denotes album did not chart or was not released in that region.

== Live albums ==
Title	Album details	Peak chart positions	Sales/Units	Certifications
Title	Album details	JPN	Sales/Units	Certifications
Live	Released: August 2, 2006; Label: Sony BMG, Avex Trax; Format: CD, cassette	100		

== Compilation albums ==
Title	Album details	Peak chart positions	Sales/Units	Certifications
Title	Album details	JPN	Sales/Units	Certifications
13 Chapters	Released: 2004; Label: Paramedia; Format: CD	—		
Best of Sweetbox 1995-2005	Released: February 2, 2005; Label: Avex Trax, BMG, Paramedia; Format: CD, cassette	5	JPN: 100,000; KOR: 97,294	RIAJ: Gold
Raw Treasures Volume 1	Released: 2005; Label: Parasongs; Format: CD	—		
Best of 12" Collection	Released: August 2, 2006; Label: Avex Trax; Format: CD	96		
Greatest Hits	Released: July 19, 2007; Label: BMG; Format: CD	—		
Complete Best	Released: December 12, 2007; Label: Avex Trax; Format: CD	16	JPN: 100,000	RIAJ: Gold
Rare Tracks	Released: February 6, 2008; Label: Avex Trax; Format: CD	89		
Sweet Wedding Best	Released: June 4, 2008; Label: Avex Casa; Format: CD	217		
Sweet Reggae Mix	Released: September 10, 2008; Label: Avex Casa; Format: CD	—		
Sweet Perfect Box	Released: September 10, 2008; Label: Avex Casa; Format: 7-CD box set	—		
Sweetest Best Selection 1997 - 2006	Released: April 19, 2017; Label: Avex Trax; Format: CD, digital download	—		
Sweetest Remix	Released: April 19, 2017; Label: Avex Trax; Format: CD, digital download	—		
Happy Wedding Complete Best	Released: February 26, 2020; Label: Avex Trax; Format: CD, digital download	—		

== Singles ==
Title	Year	Peak chart positions								Sales/Units	Certifications	Album
Title	Year	FRA	GER	JPN	KOR Foreign	NOR	SWE	UK	US	Sales/Units	Certifications	Album
"Booyah (Here We Go)" feat. Tempest	1995	—	37	—	—	—	—	—	—			Non-album singles
"Shakalaka"	1995	—	46	—	—	—	—	—	—			Non-album singles
"Wot" with Jon	1996	—	80	—	—	—	—	—	—			Non-album singles
"I'll Die For You" feat. Christopher Taylor	1997	—	59	—	—	—	—	—	—			Sweetbox
"Everything's Gonna Be Alright"	1997	3	12	—	—	3	5	5	46	FRA: 250,000; UK: 200,000	BPI: Silver; GLF: Gold; IFPI Norway: Gold; SNEP: Gold	Sweetbox
"Don't Go Away"	1998	41	65	—	—	—	32	—	—			Sweetbox
"Sometimes"	1998	—	—	—	—	—	—	—	—			Sweetbox
"Shout (Let It All Out)" feat. Christopher Taylor	1998	—	64	—	—	—	—	—	—			Sweetbox
"Trying To Be Me"	2000	—	63	—	—	—	—	—	—			Classified
"For the Lonely"	2000	—	34	—	—	—	—	—	—			Classified
"Boyfriend"	2001	—	—	—	—	—	—	—	—			Classified
"Cinderella"	2001	—	49	—	—	—	—	—	—			Classified
"Read My Mind"	2002	—	—	—	—	—	—	—	—			Jade
"Here On My Own (Lighter Shade Of Blue)"	2002	—	90	—	—	—	—	—	—			Jade
"Life Is Cool"	2004	—	—	45	—	—	—	—	—			Adagio
"Somewhere"	2004	—	—	—	—	—	—	—	—			Adagio
"After The Lights"	2004	—	—	—	—	—	—	—	—			After The Lights
"Addicted"	2006	—	—	—	—	—	—	—	—			Addicted
"Here Comes the Sun"	2006	—	—	—	—	—	—	—	—			Addicted
"We Can Work It Out"	2009	—	—	29	21	—	—	—	—	KOR: 162,269		The Next Generation
"Crash Landed"	2009	—	—	—	24	—	—	—	—	KOR: 109,749		The Next Generation
"Everything Is Nothing"	2010	—	—	—	3	—	—	—	—	KOR: 226,929		The Next Generation
"Minute By Minute"	2011	—	—	—	4	—	—	—	—			Diamond Veil
"I Know You're Not Alone"	2011	—	—	—	99	—	—	—	—			Diamond Veil
"Bullet Proof"	2011	—	—	—	5	—	—	—	—			Diamond Veil
"#Z21 (ZEITGEIST21)"	2013	—	—	—	—	—	—	—	—			#Z21
"Nothing Can Keep Me From You"	2013	—	—	—	—	—	—	—	—			#Z21
"Coming Home" feat. Saint Viv	2020	—	—	—	—	—	—	—	—			Da Capo
"Everything's Gonna Be Alright" feat. Saint Viv, Jade, and Juvan	2020	—	—	—	—	—	—	—	—			Da Capo
"—" denotes song did not chart or was not released in that region.

== Video collections ==
Ultimate Video Collection
- Released: 2008
- DVD with promotional videos up until 2006.

== Soundtracks ==
Final Fantasy X-2 International + Last Mission
- Released: 2003
- Album with additional tracks from Final Fantasy X-2.
