= For the Lonely =

2000 single by Sweetbox

"For The Lonely"

Single by Sweetbox

from the album Classified
- Released: 2000
- Genre: Pop
- Label: BMG, RCA
- Songwriters: Geo, Jade Villalon, Morricone
- Producer: Roberto Geo Rosan

Sweetbox singles chronology
"Trying To Be Me" (2000)	"For The Lonely" (2000)	"Boyfriend" (2001)

"For The Lonely" is the second single by Sweetbox from the album Classified, with Jade Villalon as a frontwoman. The song is based on a theme from "La Califfa" by Ennio Morricone.

One of its remixes can be found on the compilation albums Best of Sweetbox (2005), The Greatest Hits (2005), another remix that is found on the single can also be found on the remix albums Best of 12" Collection (2006) & Best of Remix 1995-2006 (2006), and on Complete Best (2008). Another remix from the single can be found on the 4th disc (digital download version) of Greatest Hits (2007), as well as some newer remixes never before released. A remix titled "For The Lonely (Dub's Lonely Dub)" can be found on the album Sweet Reggae Mix (2008), and lastly, a demo version can be found on the albums Raw Treasures Volume 1 (2005) and Rare Tracks (2008).

== Track listing ==
Japanese Edition
No.	Title	Writer(s)	Length
1.	"For The Lonely"	Geoman, Villalon, Morricone	3:14
2.	"For The Lonely (Geo's Remix)"	Geoman, Villalon, Morricone	3:27
3.	"Snippets From The Album"	Geoman, Villalon	5:27
4.	"For The Lonely (No Drum Mix)"	Geoman, Villalon, Morricone	3:13
5.	"For The Lonely (Instrumental)"	Geoman, Villalon, Morricone	3:14

Ireland Edition
No.	Title	Writer(s)	Length
1.	"For The Lonely (James Khari UK Radio Edition)"	Geoman, Villalon, Morricone	3:14

Japanese Edition
No.	Title	Writer(s)	Length
1.	"For The Lonely"	Geoman, Villalon, Morricone	3:14
2.	"For The Lonely (Geo's Remix)"	Geoman, Villalon, Morricone	3:27
3.	"Everything's Gonna Be Alright (Jade's Version)"	Geoman, Harris	3:10
4.	"For The Lonely (No Drum Mix)"	Geoman, Villalon, Morricone	3:13
5.	"For The Lonely (Instrumental)"	Geoman, Villalon, Morricone	3:14

Official Versions
No.	Title	Length
1.	"For The Lonely (From Classified)"	3:14
2.	"For The Lonely (Geo's Remix) (From Best Of 12" Collection)"	3:27
3.	"For The Lonely (Unreleased Demo) (From Raw Treasures Vol#1)"	2:25
4.	"For The Lonely (No Drum Mix) (From Greatest Hits)"	3:13
5.	"For The Lonely (Jiggy Joint Remix) (From Greatest Hits)"	4:24
6.	"For The Lonely (Even Sweeter) (From Best Of Sweetbox)"	3:43
7.	"For The Lonely (Instrumental) (From For The Lonely Single)"	3:14
8.	"For The Lonely (Live Piano Version) (From Rare Tracks)"	5:13
9.	"For The Lonely (Dub's Lonely Dub) (From Sweet Reggae Mix)"	5:40
10.	"For The Lonely (Live in Seoul) (From Live in Seoul)"	3:52

=== Charts ===
Chart (2000–2001)	Peak position
Germany (GfK)	34
Switzerland (Schweizer Hitparade)	84
