= Sweet Reggae Mix =

Remix album by Sweetbox
- Released: September 10th, 2008
- Recorded: 2008
- Genre: Pop, Dance, Electronic, Classical, Rock, Reggae
- Length: 46:13
- Label: Avex Casa
- Producer: Geo

Sweetbox chronology
Sweet Wedding Best (2008)	Sweet Reggae Mix (2008)	Sweet Perfect Box (2009)

Sweet Reggae Mix is the third and last remix album that was released on September 10, 2008, by Sweetbox. Two of the songs on the album are remixed and performed by Tina Harris, while the rest of them are performed by Jade Valerie. These remixes, however, are new mixes and have never before been released on any other album than this one. All of these songs in their original versions can be found on some of the other albums, and other remixes for some of them can be found on compilation albums, and even on other remix albums as well. The remix found on this album, titled "A Whole New World (Reggae Disco Rocker's Remix)" is the first remix of the original version to be officially released. The original version, however, is only released on the Complete Best album. Two other remixes, titled "That Night (Young Lover's Mix)" and "Vaya Con Dios (Gold-Dust Remix)" are also the first remixes to be made and released on any album.

== Track listing ==
1. Everything's Gonna Be Alright (Home Grown Remix) - 3:11
2. Cinderella (Boom! Me Run Remix) - 3:22
3. Somewhere (The Caveman's Remix) - 4:10
4. A Whole New World (Reggae Disco Rocker's Remix) - 4:52
5. Boyfriend (Digikal Rocky Remix) - 3:35
6. Shout -Let It All Out- ("DJ Genius" Mix) - 3:47
7. Every Step (Dancehall Remix) - 3:24
8. Killing Me DJ (1 & Indivisible Ragga Dancehall Remix) - 3:46
9. Vaya Con Dios (Gold-Dust Remix) - 3:05
10. That Night (Young Lover's Mix) - 3:35
11. For The Lonely (Dub's Lonely Dub) - 5:40
12. Life Is Cool (Feel The Echo Remix) - 3:48
