= Cinderella (Sweetbox song) =

Single by Sweetbox

from the album Classified
- Released: April 23, 2001
- Genre: Pop; classical crossover
- Length: 13:38
- Label: BMG
- Songwriters: Geoman; Jade Villalon; Anne Braendeland; Jarl Aanestad
- Producer: Geoman

Sweetbox singles chronology
"Boyfriend" (2001)	"Cinderella" (2001)	"Read My Mind" (2002)

"Cinderella" is the fourth and final single by Sweetbox from the album Classified, with Jade Villalon as a frontwoman. The song is based on Telemann's Concerto in D major for trumpet and piano.

One of its remixes can be found on the compilation album Best Of Sweetbox (2005) and on the remix album Best of 12" Collection (2006), another remix is on the album Sweet Reggae Mix (2008), a demo version can be found on Rare Tracks (2008).

The song was composed by Geoman, Villalon, Anne Braendeland and Jarl Aanestad.

== Track listing ==
Standard Edition
No.	Title	Writer(s)	Length
1.	"Cinderella"	Geoman, Villalon, Anne Braendeland, Jarl Aanestad	3:16
2.	"How Does It Feel"	Geoman, Villalon	4:02
3.	"Brown Haired Boy"	Geoman, Villalon	3:04
4.	"Cinderella (Instrumental)"	Geoman, Villalon, Anne Braendeland, Jarl Aanestad	3:16
Total length:			13:38

Official Versions
No.	Title	Writer(s)	Length
1.	"Cinderella (From Classified)"	Geoman, Villalon, Anne Braendeland, Jarl Aanestad	3:16
2.	"Cinderella (Instrumental) (From Cinderella Single Edition)"	Geoman, Villalon, Anne Braendeland, Jarl Aanestad	3:16
3.	"Cinderella (Unreleased Demo) (From Rare Tracks)"	Geoman, Villalon, Anne Braendeland, Jarl Aanestad	3:16
4.	"Cinderella (Electric Spice Mix) (From Best Of 12" Collection)"	Geoman, Villalon, Anne Braendeland, Jarl Aanestad	3:04
5.	"Cinderella (Boom! Me Run Remix) (From Sweet Reggae Mix)"	Geoman, Villalon, Anne Braendeland, Jarl Aanestad	3:22
Total length:			16:14

== Charts ==
Chart (2001)	Peak position
Austria (Ö3 Austria Top 40)	56
Germany (GfK)	49
