= This Christmas/More Than Love =

"This Christmas / More Than Love"

Single by Sweetbox

from the album After the Lights
- Released: 2004
- Genre: Pop
- Length: 3:38 (This Christmas); 3:21 (More Than Love)
- Label: Paramedia
- Songwriter(s): Geoman, Jade Villalon
- Producer(s): Geoman

Sweetbox singles chronology
"Killing Me DJ" (2004)	"This Christmas" (2004)	"Everything's Gonna Be Alright -Reborn-" (2005)

"This Christmas / More Than Love" is a single by Sweetbox from the album After the Lights with Jade Villalon as a frontwoman.

== Track listing ==
Standard Edition
No.	Title	Writer(s)	Length
1.	"This Christmas"	Geoman, Villalon	3:14
2.	"More Than Love"	Geoman, Villalon	3:21
3.	"Sweetbox Reel"
