= Classified (Sweetbox album) =

Studio album by Sweetbox
- Released: October 1, 2001
- Genres: Pop; classical crossover; R&B
- Length: 42:19
- Label: Sony BMG
- Producer: Roberto Geo Rosan

Sweetbox chronology
Sweetbox (1998)	Classified (2001)	Jade (2002)

Singles from Classified
- 1. "Trying To Be Me" Released: 2000; 2. "For The Lonely" Released: 2000; 3. "Boyfriend" Released: 2001; 4. "Cinderella" Released: 2001

Japanese Edition

Classified is the second Sweetbox album and the first album to feature Jade Villalon as the frontwoman and songwriter. Released in 2001, the album was made in three different editions. Sounds on the album include pop, dance and rock, with all of the songs based on various classical pieces, many borrowed from famous film themes. With Jade Villalon's songwriting style, this album saw Sweetbox's sound change from the R&B influences of its past. Three additional songs were written for the album; "In the Corner" and "Heartbreaker", which were released on two Sweetbox demo compilations, and "Happy Tears", which was released on Jade's final album under Sweetbox, Addicted.

== Track listing ==
All tracks are written by Geoman and Jade Villalon except where noted.

Standard Edition
No.	Title	Length
1.	"Cinderella" (Geoman, Villalon, Anne Braendeland, Jarl Aanestad)	3:16
2.	"For The Lonely" (Geoman, Villalon, Enrico Morricone)	3:10
3.	"Boyfriend" (Geoman, Villalon, Ayn Robbins, Bill Conti, Carol Von)	2:49
4.	"How Does It Feel"	4:02
5.	"Interlude Every Time"	0:44
6.	"Every Time"	3:50
7.	"Superstar"	3:06
8.	"Sacred" (Geoman, Villalon, Anne Braendeland)	3:46
9.	"That Night"	3:32
10.	"Brown Haired Boy"	3:04
11.	"Crazy"	3:32
12.	"Trying To Be Me (Featuring Mucky)" (Geoman, Villalon, Mucky)	3:05
13.	"Interlude Not Different"	0:20
14.	"Not Different (I Laugh, I Cry)"	3:34
Total length:		42:19

Special Chinese Edition
No.	Title	Writer(s)	Length
15.	"Everything's Gonna Be Alright"	Geoman, Tina Harris	3:12
16.	"Shout (Let It All Out) (Featuring D. Christopher Taylor)"	Roland Orzabal, Ian Stanley	3:05

Japanese Edition
No.	Title	Length
1.	"Cinderella" (Geoman, Villalon, Anne Braendeland, Jarl Aanestad)	3:16
2.	"For The Lonely" (Geoman, Villalon, Enrico Morricone)	3:10
3.	"Everything's Gonna Be Alright (Jade's Version)" (Geoman, Harris)	3:10
4.	"Boyfriend" (Geoman, Villalon, Ayn Robbins, Bill Conti, Carol Von)	2:49
5.	"How Does It Feel"	4:02
6.	"Interlude Every Time"	1:44
7.	"Every Time"	3:50
8.	"Superstar"	3:06
9.	"Sacred" (Geoman, Villalon, Anne Braendeland)	3:46
10.	"That Night"	3:32
11.	"Brown Haired Boy"	3:04
12.	"Crazy"	3:32
13.	"Trying To Be Me (Featuring Mucky)" (Geoman, Villalon, Mucky)	3:05
14.	"Interlude Not Different"	0:20
15.	"Not Different (I Laugh, I Cry)"	3:34
16.	"For The Lonely (Geo's Remix)" (Geoman, Villalon, Enrico Morricone)	3:25
17.	"Trying To Be Me (Featuring Mucky) (Geo's Remix)" (Geoman, Villalon, Mucky)	3:20

== Credits ==
- Conductor – Mario Klemens
- Engineer [Additional Sound] – Mila Jilek
- Producer, Recorded By, Mixed By – Geo Rosan
- Executive Producer – Heiko Schmidt
- Score [Strings] – Boris Jojic

== Samples ==
- "Boyfriend" samples "Gonna Fly Now", the Rocky theme song, by Bill Conti
- "Brown Haired Boy" samples Beethoven's "Fur Elise"
- "Cinderella" samples Telemann's "Trumpet Concerto"
- "Crazy" samples Beethoven's "5th Symphony"
- "Everything's Gonna Be Alright" samples Bach's "Air on a G String (Suite No.3)"
- "For The Lonely" samples the theme from La califfa, by Ennio Morricone
- "Not Different (I Laugh I Cry)" samples Handel's "Largo from Xerxes"
- "Superstar" samples Tchaikovsky's "Scene from Swan Lake"
- "That Night" samples Leonardo di Gioforte's "Concerto For Oboe in D Major"
- "Trying To Be Me" samples Grieg's "Solveig's Song"

== Certifications ==
Region	Certification	Certified units/sales
Japan (RIAJ)	Platinum	200,000^{^}
^{^} Shipments figures based on certification alone.
