= Here on My Own (Lighter Shade of Blue) =

"Here On My Own (Lighter Shade Of Blue)"

Single by Sweetbox

from the album Jade
- B-side: "One Kiss (Acoustic Version)"
- Released: 2002
- Genre: Pop
- Length: 3:35 (European version/Single version); 3:49 (Japanese album version)
- Label: Warner Music Group
- Songwriters: Geoman, Villalon
- Producer: Geoman

Sweetbox singles chronology
"Read My Mind" (2002)	"Here On My Own (Lighter Shade Of Blue)" (2002)	"Life Is Cool" (2004)

"Here on My Own (Lighter Shade Of Blue)" is the second single by Sweetbox from the album Jade with Jade Villalon as a frontwoman. On the album, the alternate, slower-paced version of the song is simply titled "Lighter Shade of Blue". The song peaked at 90 on the German singles chart. It spent 1 week at this position and 4 weeks on the chart.

An acoustic version and the music video of the song can be found on the album Jade (Silver Edition). A remix of the song can be found on the album Best of 12" Collection.

The music video for the song was directed by Oliver Sommer.

== Track listing ==
Standard Edition
No.	Title	Writer(s)	Length
1.	"Here On My Own (Lighter Shade Of Blue)"	Geoman, Villalon	3:35
2.	"Lighter Shade Of Blue"	Geoman, Villalon	3:49
3.	"Lighter Shade Of Blue (H-Run/Dadas Remix)"	Geoman, Villalon	3:20
4.	"Here On My Own (Lighter Shade Of Blue) (Instrumental)"	Geoman, Villalon	3:35
5.	"One Kiss (Acoustic Version)"	Geoman, Villalon	3:18

== Positions ==
Chart (2003)	Peak position
German Singles Chart	90
