= Jade Valerie discography =

- Studio albums: 3
- Singles: 6
- Music videos: 4
- Other appearances: 2

This is a list of music released by Jade Valerie, the stage name for Jade Villalon, as a solo artist. In October 2007, she released the mini album Out of the Box, after leaving the Sweetbox project. All songs were co-written with producer Geo, who had previously worked with her on Sweetbox.

Her subsequent album, Bittersweet Symphony, the seventh original album she has released in her career as a singer, reached #15 on the Oricon charts. She re-released Out of the Box in Korea, containing some of the tracks from her original album of the same name, as well as many tracks from Bittersweet Symphony. She also re-recorded the song "You Don't Know Me" with guest vocalist Kim Dong-wan for this release.

Villalon released a recording of the Christmas carol "Oh Holy Night" in Korea near the end of 2008, for the holiday season. She also released information in a video on her official website, that two new albums were to be expected in 2009, and that The Cheetah Girls had used a song on their recent album that Villalon had written in 2003.

== Albums ==
Year	Album details	Chart positions	
Year	Album details	JPN	KOR
2007	Out of the Box: Released: October 17, 2007; Label: Universal Records; Format: CD, digital download	27	1
2008	Bittersweet Symphony: Released: March 5, 2008; Label: Universal Records; Format: CD, digital download	13	—

== Studio albums ==
=== Out of the Box ===
Out of the Box

Studio album by Jade Valerie
- Released: 2007, 2008
- Genres: House, pop, electronic
- Length: 26:53
- Label: Universal Music Japan
- Producer: Roberto Geo Rosan

Jade Valerie Villalon chronology
Addicted (2006)	Out of the Box (2007)	Bittersweet Symphony (2008)

Singles from Out of the Box
- 1. "Just Another Day" Released: 2007; 2. "You Don't Know Me" Released: 2008; 3. "Razorman" Released: 2008

All tracks are written by Geoman and Jade Villalon, except "We Can Run" by Hase also.

Standard Edition
No.	Title	Length
1.	"Tuned Up"	3:39
2.	"Just Another Day"	3:17
3.	"Show Me"	3:16
4.	"Uh La La"	3:05
5.	"Crush"	3:08
6.	"Mr. Pay Me"	3:04
7.	"You Don't Know Me"	3:04
8.	"Goodbye"	4:20

Bonus DVD
No.	Title	Length
9.	"Just Another Day (Promotional Video)"	3:15

Korean Edition
No.	Title	Length
1.	"Tuned Up"	3:37
2.	"Just Another Day"	3:15
3.	"Uh La La"	3:03
4.	"You Don't Know Me"	3:01
5.	"Crush"	3:04
6.	"Show Me"	3:14
7.	"Razorman"	3:42
8.	"Like a Bird (Geo's Mix)"	3:15
9.	"Empty Pages"	3:19
10.	"Lucky Lady"	3:14
11.	"We Can Run"	3:39
12.	"Undone"	4:10
13.	"Stuck With You"	3:40
14.	"The Last"	3:20
15.	"You Don't Know Me (featuring Kim Dong Wan)"	3:03

=== Bittersweet Symphony ===
Bittersweet Symphony

Studio album by Jade Valerie
- Released: 2008
- Genres: Pop, electronic, classical
- Length: 49:48
- Label: Universal Music Japan
- Producer: Roberto Geo Rosan

Jade Valerie Villalon chronology
Out of the Box (2007)	Bittersweet Symphony (2008)	Eternity (2009)

Singles from Bittersweet Symphony
- 1. "Unbreakable" Released: 2008

All tracks are written by Geoman and Jade Villalon, except "We Can Run" by Hase also.

Standard Edition
No.	Title	Length
1.	"Unbreakable"	3:41
2.	"Like a Bird"	3:40
3.	"Out in the Sea"	3:31
4.	"Razorman"	3:44
5.	"Living By Numbers"	3:44
6.	"The Last"	3:23
7.	"We Can Run"	3:41
8.	"Stuck With You"	3:43
9.	"Lucky Lady"	3:15
10.	"Piece Of Love"	3:19
11.	"Always Mine"	3:45
12.	"Undone"	4:12
13.	"No You Don't"	2:52
14.	"Empty Pages"	3:18

=== Eternity ===
Eternity

Studio album by Jade Valerie
- Released: August 2009
- Genres: Pop, classical
- Length: 48:51
- Labels: Avex, Sony Music
- Producer: Roberto Geo Rosan

Jade Valerie Villalon chronology
Bittersweet Symphony (2008)	Eternity (2009)	Saint Vox (2009)

Singles from Eternity
- 1. "Wonderful World" Released: 2009; 2. "Love" Released: 2009; 3. "Only Human" Released: 2009; 4. "I Will" Released: 2009; 5. "Wonderful World (Classical Mix 2011)" Released: 2011

All tracks are written by Geoman and Jade Villalon, except "My Style" by Kim Eana.

Japanese Edition
No.	Title	Length
1.	"Wonderful World"	3:24
2.	"Love"	3:04
3.	"Vanity"	3:11
4.	"I Will"	3:05
5.	"Worth It All"	3:53
6.	"Change the World"	3:14
7.	"How Far"	3:32
8.	"Damn"	3:34
9.	"No Apologies"	4:13
10.	"Only Human"	3:23
11.	"So Deep"	2:56
12.	"You Smile"	3:37
13.	"Hello Goodbye"	3:14
14.	"Broken Lullaby"	3:31

iTunes Bonus Track
No.	Title	Length
15.	"Turn It Up"	3:26

Korean Edition
No.	Title	Length
1.	"Only Human"	3:10
2.	"Wonderful World"	3:24
3.	"So Deep"	2:56
4.	"Love"	3:04
5.	"You Smile"	3:37
6.	"I Will"	3:05
7.	"What You Want"	3:39
8.	"Change the World"	3:14
9.	"Vanity"	3:11
10.	"Damn"	3:34
11.	"How Far"	3:32
12.	"Worth It All"	3:53
13.	"No Apologies"	4:13
14.	"My Style"	3:16

=== Saint Vox ===
Saint Vox

Studio album by Jade Valerie
- Released: 2009
- Recorded: 43:26
- Genres: Pop, electronic, classical
- Label: Sony Music
- Producer: Roberto Geo Rosan

Jade Valerie Villalon chronology
Eternity (2009)	Saint Vox (2009)

Singles from Saint Vox
- 1. "Don't Leave Me This Way" Released: 2009

All tracks are written by Geoman and Jade Villalon.

Standard Edition
No.	Title	Length
1.	"Don't Leave Me This Way"	3:26
2.	"Rocket Girl"	3:05
3.	"No More Songs"	3:39
4.	"It Won't Matter"	3:57
5.	"Electric"	3:37
6.	"We Fall"	3:16
7.	"Remember September"	3:16
8.	"Killa"	3:35
9.	"Crashing Down"	4:03
10.	"Take the Night Off"	3:52
11.	"System Down"	3:52
12.	"I'm There"	3:48

== Singles ==
=== Just Another Day ===
"Just Another Day" was the first single released by Villalon in her solo career for the Out of the Box album. It was written by herself and Roberto Geo Rosan. Toby Breitenbach featured on backing vocals. A promotional video was made for this single.

No.	Title	Length
1.	"Just Another Day"	3:15

=== You Don't Know Me ===
"You Don't Know Me" was the second single released by Villalon in her solo career for the Out of the Box album. It was written by herself and Roberto Geo Rosan, and features Kim Dong Wan. The music is also featured in Kim Dong Wan's album, The Secret; Between Us.

No.	Title	Length
1.	"You Don't Know Me (featuring Kim Dong Wan)"	3:03
2.	"You Don't Know Me"	3:01

=== Razorman ===
"Razorman" was the third and final single released by Villalon in her solo career for the Out of the Box album. It was written by herself and Roberto Geo Rosan. The music was first featured in Bittersweet Symphony, and was only included on the Korean edition of Out of the Box.

No.	Title	Length
1.	"Razorman"	3:40
2.	"Razorman (Dance Remix)"	3:47
3.	"Like a Bird"	3:44

=== Unbreakable ===
"Unbreakable" was the first and only single released by Villalon for the Bittersweet Symphony album. It was written by herself and Roberto Geo Rosan. It was based on "Moonlight Sonata". A promotional video was made for this single.

No.	Title	Length
1.	"Unbreakable"	3:41

=== Oh Holy Night ===
"Oh Holy Night" is a single released by Villalon in her solo career. It was not featured on any album released by her. It was released in 2008 for the Christmas season in Korea, available via digital download.

No.	Title	Length
1.	"Oh Holy Night"	3:34

=== Wonderful World ===
"Wonderful World" is the first single released by Villalon in her Eternity side project for the eponymous Eternity album. It was written by herself and Roberto Geo Rosan. The music samples "Canon in D Major" by Johann Pachelbel. Another version entitled "Wonderful World (Classical Mix 2011)" was released as a single.

No.	Title	Length
1.	"Wonderful World"	3:24

No.	Title	Length
1.	"Wonderful World (Classical Mix 2011)"	2:58

=== Love ===
"Love" is the second single released by Villalon in her Eternity side project for the eponymous Eternity album. It was written by herself and Roberto Geo Rosan. The music samples "Canon in D Major" by Johann Pachelbel.

No.	Title	Length
1.	"Love"	3:04

=== Only Human ===
"Only Human" is the third single released by Villalon in her Eternity side project for the eponymous Eternity album. It was written by herself and Roberto Geo Rosan. The music samples "Morning Mood" by Edvard Greig. The single was available only on the Korean and Taiwan editions of the album.

No.	Title	Length
1.	"Only Human (New Single Edit)"	3:10

=== I Will ===
"I Will" is the fourth single released by Villalon in her Eternity side project for the eponymous Eternity album. It was written by herself and Roberto Geo Rosan. The music samples "Spring" from "The Four Seasons" by Antonio Vivaldi.

No.	Title	Length
1.	"I Will"	3:05
2.	"I Will (Club Mix)"	3:26
3.	"You Smile"	3:37

=== Don't Leave Me This Way ===
"Don't Leave Me This Way" is the first and only single released by Villalon in her Saint Vox side project in collaboration with Emiri Miyamoto for the eponynous Saint Vox album. It was written by herself and Roberto Geo Rosan. The music samples "Energy Flow".

No.	Title	Length
1.	"Don't Leave Me This Way"	3:26

=== Don't Tell Me I'm Wrong ===
"Don't Tell Me I'm Wrong" is a single released by Villalon in collaboration with Brian Joo. It was not released on any of her albums, and is featured on Joo's album Reborn Part 2.

No.	Title	Length
1.	"Don't Tell me I'm Wrong (featuring Brian Joo)"	3:17

== EP ==
=== Bittersweet Symphony ===
Bittersweet Symphony

EP by Jade Valerie Villalon
- Released: 2007
- Genres: Classical, electronic, pop

All tracks are written by Geoman and Jade Villalon, except "We Can Run" by Hase also.

No.	Title	Length
1.	"Lucky Lady"	3:15
2.	"We Can Run"	3:41
3.	"The Last"	3:23
4.	"Out in the Sea"	3:31
5.	"Stuck With You"	3:43
6.	"Razorman"	3:44
8.	"Empty Pages"	3:18
