= Addicted =

Addicted may refer to:

== Film and television ==
- Addicted (2002 film), a South Korean film
  - Possession (2009 film), a U.S. remake of the South Korean film starring Sarah Michelle Gellar
- Addicted (TV series), an American reality television series
- Addicted (2014 film), a film adaptation of the novel by Zane
- Addicted (web series), a Chinese Boys' Love web series

== Music ==
=== Albums ===
- Addicted (Devin Townsend Project album), or the title song
- Addicted (Sweetbox album), or the title song (see below)

=== Songs ===
- "Addicted" (Ace Young song)
- "Addicted" (Bliss n Eso song)
- "Addicted" (Cheryl Wheeler song), covered by Dan Seals
- "Addicted" (Danny Fernandes song)
- "Addicted" (Enrique Iglesias song)
- "Addicted" (Jisoo song)
- "Addicted" (Saving Abel song)
- "Addicted" (Simple Plan song)
- "Addicted" (Sweetbox song)
- "Addicted", by Amy Winehouse from Back to Black
- "Addicted", by Camp Mulla
- "Addicted", by the Chainsmokers from No Hard Feelings
- "Addicted", by Chris Brown from Breezy
- "Addicted", by Ciara from Ciara: The Evolution (UK & Europe)
- "Addicted", by Devin Townsend Project from Addicted
- "Addicted", by DJ Assad featuring Mohombi, Craig David & Greg Parys
- "Addicted", by Eminem from Recovery
- "Addicted", by Ivy Lies
- "Addicted", by Juliana Hatfield from Become What You Are
- "Addicted", by Kelly Clarkson from Breakaway
- "Addicted", by LeRoux from Last Safe Place
- "Addicted", by Lit from Atomic
- "Addicted", by Lovebites from Clockwork Immortality
- "Addicted", by Madonna from Rebel Heart
- "Addicted", by Maluma from PB.DB The Mixtape
- "Addicted", by Marit Larsen from The Chase
- "Addicted", by Monsta X from One of a Kind
- "Addicted", by Ne-Yo from Because of You
- "Addicted", by Neil Finn from Try Whistling This
- "Addicted", by Pixy
- "Addicted", by P.O.D. from When Angels & Serpents Dance
- "Addicted", by Prince Royce from Phase II
- "Addicted", by Sisqó from Unleash the Dragon

== Literature ==
- Addicted, an autobiography by Tony Adams
- Addicted, a novel by Zane

== See also ==
- Addiction (disambiguation)
- Addictive (disambiguation)
