= The Next Generation (album) =

Studio album by Sweetbox
- Released: June 10, 2009 (Japanese Edition); November 17, 2009 (Korean Edition) (European Edition)
- Recorded: 2007–2009
- Genre: R&B/Soul
- Length: 59:42 (Japanese Edition); 59:16 (Korean Edition) (European Edition)
- Labels: Warner Music Group (Japanese Edition); Sony Music (Korean Edition); Paramusic Corporation (European Edition)
- Producer: Derek Bramble

Sweetbox studio albums chronology
Addicted (2006)	The Next Generation (2009)	Diamond Veil (2011)

Singles from The Next Generation
- 1. "We Can Work It Out" Released: 2009; 2. "Crash Landed" Released: 2009; 3. "Everything is Nothing" Released: 2010

The Next Generation is the seventh studio album by international pop music project, Sweetbox. It is the first album to have Jamie Pineda as front woman after Jade Villalon departed to record under her own name. The release is also the first album to have Derek Bramble as the producer after the producer of the project, Geo, followed Jade Villalon into her releases.

The sound that came with the album featured powerful R&B-influenced ballads and upbeat dance genres co-written by Jamie and various writers from all around the globe, including Lindy Robbins, Georgie Dennis, and Derek Bramble.

The album also features the element Sweetbox is known for — the mixing of sampled classical music with pop.

- "We Can Work It Out" sampled Vivaldi's "Four Seasons".
- "Crash Landed" sampled Bach's "Toccata & Fuge in D minor".
- "Magic" sampled Beethoven's "Symphony No. 9".

In addition, a new version of "Everything's Gonna Be Alright" was recorded, featuring Jamie Pineda and Derek Bramble, with re-written lyrics.

The album was well received in Japan and had success in Korea. In Japan, the album hit #4 on the Oricon International Charts, and in Korea, it hit several charts, including a four-week stay on Bugs and five other #1's on Soribada, Mnet, Daum, Naver and SKT NATE RT.

== Production ==
In late 2007 after being signed to the project, Jamie Pineda got right to work on writing for her first studio album. Pineda traveled all around the globe while writing with co-writers for the album to places such as Stockholm, Frankfurt and Nashville, just to name a few. Her co-writers included top hit makers Guy Roche, Lindy Robbins and Toby Gad. For nearly 8 months she traveled while writing for the album and in June 2008 started working with the new producer of the project, songwriter/producer Derek Bramble. From June 2008 to October 2008, the two worked on the album's production. Pineda recalls in a November 2009 interview that she and Bramble were both such perfectionists that sometimes they would get into small arguments but overall the production went great.

== Music ==
The album's lyrics are focused on primarily on love and joy. The Next Generation is mostly a pop album as showcased in the songs "More Than You'll Ever Know" and "Blue Angel" but has a strong R&B influence on such tracks as "Love Forgets" and "These Dayz".

To go along with the album, Jamie and Derek recorded a new version of the song that made Sweetbox famous, Everything's Gonna Be Alright. The new version included re-worded lyrics and also featured Derek Bramble singing on the track.

"We Can Work It Out", the album's lead single became the biggest hit from the album, reaching #27 on Japan's Billboard Hot 100 and reaching several top 10 radio charts. Amongst other successes, the single was #4 on iTunes Pop Charts in Japan. In Korea, the song was even more successful hitting #1 on 6 major charts including Bugs and Mnet, while also reaching top 10 positions on other charts like Cyworld, Soribada and Melon. "Crash Landed", the second single in Japan and the third in Korea was released where it peaked on the Gaon Charts at #12. "Crash Landed" did not chart anywhere in Japan. The third overall single, "Everything is Nothing", a mid-tempo dance track was released in Korea as the second single. Before the song was even released as a single in Korea, it reached several top 10 chart positions including Daum and Bugs. Although it had no release in Japan, the song reached #7 on iTunes Pop charts. The song is also featured in the Korean version of Audition Online.

== Album information ==
To go along with the lead single "We Can Work It Out", a Yasutaka Nakata remix of Everything's Gonna Be Alright received airplay in Japan.

Because the previous singer of the project Jade Villalon was with the project so long and was releasing an album around the same time as Pineda, fans pitted the two against one another.

In May 2009, Jamie went to Japan to promote the album. She performed at various shows including Warner Japan's FRESHNESS event and a promotional appearance and performance at J-Wave's HAPPINESS program.

== Reception ==
=== Critical ===
The album received mixed reviews. While Jamie had gained new fans as the new face of Sweetbox, some fans were critical of the change. Some listeners blamed not Pineda, but the songs for not liking the album as they were almost all slow songs. Standout tracks to most fans included the lead single, "We Can Work It Out" and the pop ballad "With a Love Like You".

=== Commercial ===
While the album did not surpass sells of previous Sweetbox albums, the album in no way did bad on the charts. The album was well received in Japan and had incredible success in Korea. In Japan the album hit #4 on the Oricon International Charts and in Korea it hit several charts including a 4-week stay on Bugs and 5 other #1's on Soribada, Mnet, Daum, Naver and SKT NATE RT.

== Singles ==
- "We Can Work It Out" was the first single from the album, released in April 2009 in Japan and November 2009 in Korea. It became the biggest charting single from the album, finding itself on several top 5 radio positions in Japan and reaching #4 on Japan's iTunes Pop Charts.
- "Crash Landed" was the second single to be released in Japan in July 2009 and the third to be released in Korea in April 2010. In Japan, the single didn't chart as well as "We Can Work It Out" but received quite a bit of airplay on radio. The single reached #12 on the International Gaon chart.
- "Everything is Nothing" was second single to be released to Korea in February 2010. The song charted well in Korea, reaching #4 on the International Gaon Chart. Despite not being released as a single in Japan, Everything is Nothing was #7 on iTunes Pop Charts.

== Track listing ==
Standard Edition
No.	Title	Writer(s)	Length
1.	"We Can Work It Out"	Georgie Dennis, Tom Barnes, Galvin Jones, Ben Kohn, Peter Kelleher, Jamie Pineda	3:48
2.	"You Don't Know What You're Sorry For"	Carl Bjorsell, Edward Steve Louis, Charlie Mason	3:46
3.	"In a Heartbeat"	Edward Steve Louis, Steve Lee, Bob Bradley, Sarah Lundback, Andrew Thomas	3:47
4.	"With a Love Like You"	Carl Bjorsell, Edward Steve Louis, Sebastian Thott	4:30
5.	"Everything is Nothing"	Hanne Sorvaag, Harry Sommerdahl, Jade McRae	3:38
6.	"Crash Landed"	Georgie Dennis, Tom Barnes, Gavin Jones, Ben Kohn, Peter Kelleher, Jamie Pineda	2:57
7.	"Everything's Gonna Be Alright"	Geoman, Harris	2:59
8.	"Blue Angel"	Deborah French, Grant Black, Andrew Murray, Christian Ballard, Jamie Pineda	3:09
9.	"Magic"	Alice Gernandt, Gustav Efraimsson	3:23
10.	"Everybody Come Out In The Sunshine"	Steve Lee, Jukka Immonen, Jamie Pineda	3:46
11.	"These Dayz"	Reed Vertelney, Lindy Robbins	3:51
12.	"More Than You'll Ever Know"	Ashley Gorley, Chris Farren, Jamie Pineda	3:54
13.	"When Will It Be Me"	Lindy Robbins, Derek Bramble & Yasmeen Sulieman	3:47
14.	"Coming Home To You"	Carl Bjorsell, Edward Steve Louis & Didrik Thott	4:18
15.	"Love Forgets"	Liz Vidal, Guy Roche & Jamie Pineda	4:01
16.	"Everything's Gonna Be Alright (Yasutaka Nakata Capsule Remix)"	Geoman, Harris (Remixed by: Yasutaka Nakata)	4:05

European Import
No.	Title	Writer(s)	Length
1.	"Rockstar"	Carla Carter, Lars Halvor Jensen, Martin Michael	3:39
2.	"We Can Work It Out (Wedding Mix)"	Georgie Dennis, Tom Barnes, Galvin Jones, Ben Kohn, Peter Kelleher, Jamie Pineda	3:53

Korean Edition
No.	Title	Writer(s)	Length
1.	"We Can Work It Out"	Georgie Dennis, Tom Barnes, Galvin Jones, Ben Kohn, Peter Kelleher, Jamie Pineda	3:48
2.	"Everything is Nothing"	Hanne Sorvaag, Harry Sommerdahl, Jade McRae	3:38
3.	"Magic"	Alice Gernandt, Gustav Efraimsson	3:23
4.	"Crash Landed"	Georgie Dennis, Tom Barnes, Gavin Jones, Ben Kohn, Peter Kelleher, Jamie Pineda	2:57
5.	"Rockstar"	Carla Carter, Lars Halvor Jensen, Martin Michael	3:39
6.	"Love Forgets"	Liz Vidal, Guy Roche & Jamie Pineda	4:01
7.	"More Than You'll Ever Know"	Ashley Gorley, Chris Farren, Jamie Pineda	3:54
8.	"Everybody Come Out In The Sunshine"	Steve Lee, Jukka Immonen, Jamie Pineda	3:46
9.	"When Will It Be Me"	Lindy Robbins, Derek Bramble & Yasmeen Sulieman	3:47
10.	"You Don't Know What You're Sorry For"	Carl Bjorsell, Edward Steve Louis, Charlie Mason	3:46
11.	"In a Heartbeat"	Edward Steve Louis, Steve Lee, Bob Bradley, Sarah Lundback, Andrew Thomas	3:47
12.	"With a Love Like You"	Carl Bjorsell, Edward Steve Louis, Sebastian Thott	4:30
13.	"Blue Angel"	Deborah French, Grant Black, Andrew Murray, Christian Ballard, Jamie Pineda	3:09
14.	"Coming Home To You"	Carl Bjorsell, Edward Steve Louis & Didrik Thott	4:18
15.	"These Dayz"	Reed Vertelney, Lindy Robbins	3:51
16.	"Everything's Gonna Be Alright"	Geoman, Harris	2:59

== Notes ==
- The song "Rockstar" was the only song not produced by Derek Bramble. It was instead produced by George "Chico" Bennett & Richard "Vission" Gonzales.
- A "European Import" version was released digitally through digital music programs and websites like Amie Street and iTunes that featured a wedding mix for "We Can Work It Out" and also had the song "Rockstar" on it. The Japanese re-release featured the song "Rockstar" as well.

== Release history ==
Region	Date	Label	Other
Japan	06/10/09	Warner Music Japan	Includes EGBA Remix & These Dayz as bonus tracks.
Korea	11/17/09	Sony Music Korea	Includes the track "Rockstar"
iTunes	07/13/09	Self-release	Worldwide release
European Import	11/13/09	Paramusic Corporation	Includes "We Can Work It Out (WEDDING Mix)"
US Import (Japan)	11/24/09	Self-release	Titled a US Import but released in Japan.

== Musicians ==
- Jamie Pineda - Vocals
- G'harah "PK" Degeddingseze - Programming & Keys
- Alex Alessandroni - AC Pianos
- Brett Farkas - Guitars
- Mike Herring - Guitars
- Derek Bramble - Bass, Guitars, Keys, Percussions, Vocals
- Amanda Wheeler - Background vocals
- Sutan Brittan - Background vocals
- Steve Lu - String Arrangements
- L.A. Strings - String Arrangements
- Grace Lee - Violins

== Production ==
- Producers: Derek Bramble on all tracks except "Rockstar" which was produced by George "Chico" Bennett & Richard "Vission" Gonzales.
- Executive Producer: Heiko Schmidt
- Production Coordinator: Michael Anderson
- Engineers: Rob Chiarelli
