= Jamie Pineda =

American musician (born 1988)

- Pineda at radio appearance in June 2009, promoting her 2009 debut album, The Next Generation

Background information
- Born: Jamie Irene Pineda; September 27, 1988 (age 38); Fall River Mills, California, United States
- Genres: Pop, R&B, Soul, Dance, Latin Pop
- Occupations: Singer, songwriter, model
- Instruments: Vocals, guitar, piano
- Years active: 2007–present
- Labels: Paramusic Corporation (2007); Warner Music Japan (2011)
- Formerly of: Sweetbox
- Website: www.sweetbox.com Instagram/Jamie_Pineda

Jamie Irene Pineda (born September 27, 1988) is an American pop singer-songwriter and former model. In late 2007, Pineda signed on to be the front woman of the international pop music project Sweetbox staying with the group until 2012. In 2013, she took part in third season of the American music competition series The X Factor.

== Early life ==
Pineda is of Mexican descent and grew up in Fall River Mills, California with eight brothers and sisters. Growing up, she played guitar and piano in the church choir while also singing in the school choir. When she was 14, she was offered a contract after an executive heard her singing on the balcony of her grandmother's restaurant. However, her family said she was much too young and they passed on the opportunity. When she was 15, Jamie stood in line to audition for American Idol but was 20 days too young to compete. Among her credits, she has performed at a halftime show for the Sacramento Kings game. She has stated before that some of her influences are Mariah Carey, Selena, Etta James and Alicia Keys.

== Sweetbox ==
After her town raised money for Pineda to move to Los Angeles, she made the move and found herself modeling for an agency to make ends meet, while trying to make it as a musician. In August 2007, the agency informed Jamie about the international pop project Sweetbox looking for a new singer after the last singer, Jade Villalon, left to embark on a solo career. Taking the chance, she auditioned and impressed executive producer Heiko Schmidt. The next day, the then 18-year-old did some test recordings for Heiko in the studio of Bernd Burgdorf. She signed on soon thereafter to become the new front woman of the project.

=== The Next Generation ===
The same month, Pineda got to work and began traveling around the globe to places including Stockholm, Gothenburg, New York City and London. While having songs written for her as the new face of Sweetbox, Pineda also co-wrote tracks with Toby Gad, Georgie Dennis and Derek Bramble. Seeing that they worked so well together, Bramble was chosen as the producer for the album, taking over the spot Geo left vacant after he and Jade Villalon left the project.

In May 2008, Derek and Pineda got to work on the album, entitled The Next Generation. The duo recorded the album in Los Angeles, California with the help of mix engineer Rob Chiarelli, Derek's longtime partner.

The album's debut single, "We Can Work It Out", was released in April 2009 to Japan and reached No. 4 on iTunes Pop charts and eventually reached No. 27 of the Japan Billboard Hot 100. Two more singles, "Crash Landed" and "Everything is Nothing", were released from the album.

The album was released to Japan under the Warner Music Japan label in June 2009 and in Korea under the Sony BMG label in November 2009. Pineda promoted the album in Japan in May and June 2009 by visiting radio stations and performing at various events, including the FRESHNESS Warner event which showcased Warner Japan's hottest talent. In July 2009 the album was released via iTunes worldwide. It was the first Sweetbox release in North America since the debut album from the project in 1998.

The album was well received in Japan and had success in Korea. It peaked in the top 10 on several charts for both countries, including No. 4 on the Oricon International Charts and No. 1 on several Korean charts.

=== Diamond Veil ===
Pineda started writing for the second album in June 2009, right after her first album release. Through the official Sweetbox website, she had been asking fans what they would like to see on the album. In September 2009, Pineda traveled to Sweden and started working with previous writers on the album. Pineda took a more hands-on role with the writing of this album and has stated she keeps a notebook with her at all times for inspiration. In a November 2009 interview, she stated that with this writing process she has a lot to write about and more emotions were coming out with the writing.

In January 2010, Heiko Schmidt announced that Pineda had finished writing for the album and that the second release from Pineda would be recorded in the coming months and would be released in the second quarter of 2010. He stated that the new album would feature "more uptempo and high energetic songs" than the project's previous release. In February 2010, Pineda traveled to Sweden once again and continued writing and recording. There, she once again collaborated with Didrik and Sebastian Thott, who co-wrote on Pineda's first studio album.

That May it was announced via Pineda's Twitter that the album would be released in September 2010. However, with lack of promotion and information the album was released on iTunes and Amazon on May 18, 2011. The cover art of the album is different from the Japanese version. The album has kept its original name Diamond Veil from the beginning of recording. The album is more upbeat and dance-oriented than the previous effort with Pineda due to that being the main criticism of the last album The Next Generation.

Pineda posted two videos on Warner Japan's YouTube page talking about songs on Diamond Veil.

On July 12, the deluxe version of Diamond Veil was released digitally, containing all the tracks found on the physical version. This version contains new artwork using a photo from The Next Generation as a new photo shoot was not done.

=== Departure from Sweetbox ===
After the release of Diamond Veil, Pineda left the group. While she had been somewhat open about not being pleased with how her career with Sweetbox went, it is unclear on what terms she left.

Her background vocals were used for the song "Stolen" on the 2008 album I Am by the German girl group Monrose. Pineda had recorded the song while in Sweden in 2007 but the song was given to Monrose for their third album.

== The X Factor ==
In 2013, she auditioned for the third season of The X Factor USA, but did not advance to the live shows.

== Personal life ==
Pineda is married to Juan Manuel Venegas and resides in Redding, California with her two dogs, and children.

== Discography ==
Albums

- The Next Generation (2009)
- Diamond Veil (2011)

Singles

- "We Can Work It Out" (2009)
- "Crash Landed" (2009)
- "Everything is Nothing" (2010)
- "Remember This Dance" (2011)
- "Minute By Minute" (2011)
- "I Know You're Not Alone" (2011)
