= Complete Best =

Complete Best may refer to:

- Complete Best (Celine Dion album), 2008
- Complete Best (Sweetbox album), 2007
- Complete Best, Day After Tomorrow album
- Perfume: Complete Best, 2006
