= I Can't Believe It =

I Can't Believe It may refer to:

- "I Can't Believe It", a song by The Animals, B-side to We Gotta Get out of This Place, 1965
- "I Can't Believe It", a song by Ateed
- "I Can't Believe It!", a song by Keith Green from For Him Who Has Ears to Hear, 1977
- "I Can't Believe It", a song by Longbranch Pennywhistle used in the 1971 film Vanishing Point
- "I Can't Believe It", a song by Melba Moore from Read My Lips, 1985
- "I Can't Believe It", a song by Snowy White from That Certain Thing, 1987

== See also ==
- Can't Believe It (disambiguation)
