= Read My Mind =

Read My Mind may refer to:

- Read My Mind (album), a 1994 album by Reba McEntire
- "Read My Mind" (The Killers song), 2007
- "Read My Mind" (Sweetbox song), 2002
- "Read My Mind", a 2013 song by The Wanted from Word of Mouth
- "Read My Mind", a 2019 song by Rynx from In Pieces
