= Adicto =

Adicto may refer to:

- Adicto (album), by Fuerza Regida, 2020
- "Adicto" (Prince Royce song), 2018
- "Adicto" (Tainy, Anuel AA and Ozuna song), 2019
- "Adicto", the Spanish version of the Enrique Iglesias song "Addicted"

== See also ==
- Addicted (disambiguation)
