= Best of Sweetbox =

Best Of Sweetbox

Greatest hits album by Sweetbox
- Released: 2005
- Genre: Pop; rock; classical; dance
- Label: Avex Trax; Sony BMG; HIM
- Producer: Geo Rosan

Sweetbox chronology
After the Lights (2005)	Best Of Sweetbox (2005)	Raw Treasures Vol#1 (2005)

Singles from Best Of Sweetbox
- 1. "Everything's Gonna Be Alright -Reborn" Released: 2005

Best of Sweetbox 1995-2005 (also titled The Greatest Hits) is a compilation album of Sweetbox with Jade Villalon as frontwoman. It was released in 2005 in three different editions. It contains the previously unreleased tracks Crown of Thorns and Don't Wanna Kill You, along with several remixes, demo versions, new versions of songs and Jade's brand-new, changed-lyric version of Everything's Gonna Be Alright, which was a song made famous by Sweetbox' previous vocalist Tina Harris.

== Track listing ==
=== The Greatest Hits ===
1. Everything's Gonna Be Alright -Reborn-
2. Life Is Cool
3. For The Lonely (Even Sweeter Version)
4. Waterfall
5. After The Lights
6. Killing Me DJ
7. Hate Without Frontiers
8. Read My Mind
9. Don't Wanna Kill You
10. Piano In The Dark
11. Every Time (All Grown Up Version)
12. Crown of Thorns
13. Utopia
14. Lighter Shade Of Blue (European Version)
15. On The Radio
16. Somewhere
17. Chyna Girl
18. Cinderella (Electric Spice Mix)
19. Everything's Gonna Be Alright (Classic Mix)
20. Unforgiven (Unreleased Demo Version)

=== Best of Sweetbox 1995–2005 (European version) ===
1. Everything's Gonna Be Alright -Reborn-
2. Life Is Cool
3. For The Lonely
4. Waterfall
5. After The Lights
6. Killing Me DJ (European Version)
7. Hate Without Frontiers
8. Every Time (New Version)
9. Piano In The Dark
10. On The Radio
11. Lighter Shade Of Blue (European Version)
12. God On Video
13. More Than Love
14. Chyna Girl
15. Crazy (Unreleased Demo Version)
16. Tour De France (Unreleased Demo Version)
17. Cinderella (Electric Spice Mix)
18. Don't Push Me
19. Booyah - Here We Go (Bonus Track)
20. Shakalaka (Bonus Track)

=== Best of Sweetbox 1995–2005 (Korean version, 2 CD) ===
1. Everything's Gonna Be Alright -Reborn-
2. Life Is Cool
3. For The Lonely (Even Sweeter Version)
4. Every Time (New Version)
5. Read My Mind
6. Cinderella (Electric Spice Mix)
7. Lighter Shade Of Blue (European Version)
8. On The Radio
9. Chyna Girl
10. Liberty
11. Human Sacrifice
12. Unforgiven
13. Sorry
14. Don't Push Me
15. I'll Be There
16. Crazy (Unreleased Demo Version)

Disc 2

1. Everything's Gonna Be Alright (Classic Mix)
2. Alright (Unplugged)
3. Unforgiven (Unplugged)
4. Utopia (Unplugged)
5. Read My Mind (Acoustic Version)
6. Unforgiven (Unreleased Demo Version)
7. Booyah - Here We Go
8. Shakalaka

=== Best of Sweetbox 1995–2005 (Taiwanese Version) ===
1. Everything's Gonna Be Alright -Reborn-
2. Read My Mind
3. That Night
4. For The Lonely (Even Sweeter Version)
5. More Than Love
6. Life Is Cool
7. Every Time (New Version)
8. Chyna Girl
9. Superstar
10. Killing Me DJ
11. Somewhere
12. Cinderella (Electric Spice Mix)
13. Unforgiven (Geo's Mix)
14. After The Lights
15. On The Radio
16. Hate Without Frontiers
17. Here On My Own (Lighter Shade Of Blue) (European Version)
18. Piano In The Dark
19. Crazy
20. Tour De France

== Singles ==
- Everything's Gonna Be Alright -Reborn- [Promo]

== Chart performance ==
- The Greatest Hits reached #1 on Oricon's International Charts in Japan and held the position for three consecutive weeks in February 2005.
- Best Of reached #1 in Korea in May 2005 (won Double Platinum).
- The Greatest Hits sold 205,507 copies and became the 73rd best selling album of 2005.

== Certifications ==
Region	Certification	Certified units/sales
Japan (RIAJ)	Gold	100,000^{^}
^{^} Shipments figures based on certification alone.
