= Addictive (disambiguation) =

Addictive refers to things characterized by, or causing, addiction.

Addictive may also refer to:

- Addictive (Australian band), an Australian thrash metal band
- Addictive (English band), a pop/dance duo
- "Addictive" (song), a 2002 song by Truth Hurts
- Addictive TV, a UK media production company

== See also ==
- Addicted (disambiguation)
- Addiction (disambiguation)
- Addict (soundtrack), soundtrack album from the anime series FLCL
- "Addicts", 2001 episode of American sitcom Undeclared
