= Diamond Veil =

Studio album by Sweetbox
- Released: May 18, 2011 (Digitally); May 25, 2011 (Japanese Edition); June 3, 2011 (Korean Edition)
- Genre: Pop classical
- Length: 1:03:14 (Japanese Edition) (Digitally); 56:47 (Korean Edition)
- Labels: Warner Music Japan (Japanese Edition); Sony Music (Korean Edition); Parasongs Corporation (Digitally)
- Producers: Sebastian Thott, Heiko Schmidt (exec.), Hayden Bell (exec.)

Sweetbox chronology
| The Next Generation (2009) | Diamond Veil (2011) |

Singles from Diamond Veil
- 1. "Remember This Dance" Released: 2011; 2. "Minute By Minute" Released: 2011; 3. "I Know You're Not Alone" Released: 2011

Diamond Veil is the eighth studio album by Sweetbox and Jamie Pineda's second studio album. It was released on May 25, 2011, in Japan, and on June 3, 2011, in Korea. It includes 15 new songs written by Jamie Pineda, Sebastian Thott and many others. The Korean and Japanese releases contains all 15 songs, with Japan's version including 2 extra bonus tracks. The album was also released digitally via iTunes and Amazon on May 18, 2011.

== Track listing ==
Standard Edition
| No. | Title | Writer(s) | Length |
|---|---|---|---|
| 1. | "Minute By Minute" | Arnthor Birgisson, Savan Kotecha | 3:57 |
| 2. | "Bullet Proof" | Alan Rich, Edward Steve Louis, Greg Ogan, Iggy Strange Dahl, Jud Friedman |
| 3. | "I Know You're Not Alone" | Edward Steve Louis, Hayley Aitken, Iggy Strange Dahl, Johan Jihde, Sarah Lundback | 3:59 |
| 4. | "Air Raid" | Didrik Thott, Marc Nelkin, Sebastian Thott | 3:41 |
| 5. | "Under The Influence" | Erik Lidbom, Hayley Aitken, Jamie Pineda | 3:58 |
| 6. | "Shot Gun" | Didrik Thott, Jamie Pineda, Sebastian Thott | 3:17 |
| 7. | "Dizzy" | Don Sommerville, Edward Steve Louis, Jany Schella | 3:01 |
| 8. | "Fever" | Edward Steve Louis, Galaxy Girls, Wayne Beckford | 3:19 |
| 9. | "Nothing 'Bout Nothing" | Christian Fast, Edward Steve Louis, Henrik Nordenback | 3:46 |
| 10. | "Echo" | Edward Steve Louis, Iggy Strange Dahl, Sarah Lundback Eric Sanicola | 4:06 |
| 11. | "Undo This Hurt" | Edward Steve Louis, Hanne Soevaag, Sarah Lundback | 4:05 |
| 12. | "I Don't Give a Damn" | Christian Fast, Henrik Nordenback, Jamie Pineda | 3:51 |
| 13. | "Once" | ward Steve Louis, Hayley Aitken, Iggy Strange Dahl, Sarah Lundback | 3:30 |
| 14. | "Indestructible" | Christian Fast, Edward Steve Louis, Henrik Nordenback, Iggy Strange Dahl | 4:03 |
| 15. | "Remember This Dance" | Edward Steve Louis, Hayley Aitken, Iggy Strange Dahl | 4:22 |

Japanese and Deluxe Bonus
| No. | Title | Writer(s) | Length |
|---|---|---|---|
| 16. | "Everything's Gonna Be Alright" | Geoman, Harris | 3:15 |
| 17. | "Everything's Gonna Be Alright -Reborn-" | Geoman, Harris | 3:13 |

== Credits ==
- A&R – Hayden Bell
- Backing Vocals – Alina Devecerski (tracks: 1, 5, 9–11)
- Edited By [Vocals] – Carl Bjorsell (tracks: 1, 2), Didrik Thott (tracks: 3, 4, 6), Sebastian Thott
- Executive Producer – Hayden Bell, Heiko Schmidt
- Mastered By – Bjorn Engelman
- Mixed By – Bart Ullared Jonsson
- Producer, Arranged By, Programmed By, Instruments – Sebastian Thott
- Recorded By [Vocals] – Christian Fast (tracks: 14), Erik Lewander (tracks: 7, 8), Henrik Nordenback (tracks: 14), Sebastian Thott
- Vocals – Jamie Pineda

== Samples ==
- "Bullet Proof" samples 'Bolero' from Maurice Ravel
- "Everything's Gonna Be Alright" samples 'Air on a G String (Suite No.3)' from J.S Bach
- "I Know You're Not Alone" samples 'Spring from The Four Seasons' from Vivaldi
- "Minute By Minute" samples 'Morning from Peer Gynt Suite' from Grieg
- "Under The Influence" 'Concerto For Piano And Orchestra No.1' from Tchaikovsky
