= Can't Believe It =

Can't Believe It refers to:

- Can't Believe It (T-Pain song), 2008
- Can't Believe It (Flo Rida song), 2013
- "Can't Believe It", a song by Kid Cudi from the 2022 album Entergalactic
- "Can't Believe It", a song by Manfred Mann from the 1964 album The Five Faces of Manfred Mann
- "Can't Believe It", a song by Pere Ubu from the 1981 album 390° of Simulated Stereo
- "Can't Believe It", a song by Pennywise from the 1999 album Straight Ahead

== See also ==
- I Can't Believe It (disambiguation)
