= Trying to Be Me (song) =

"Trying To Be Me"

Single by Sweetbox

from the album Classified
- Released: October 9, 2000
- Genre: Pop
- Length: 3:08
- Label: BMG
- Songwriters: Geo, Jade Villalon, Mucky
- Producer: Roberto Geo Rosan

Sweetbox singles chronology
"U Make My Love Come Down" (1999)	"Trying To Be Me" (2000)	"For The Lonely" (2000)

"Trying To Be Me" is the first single by Sweetbox from the album Classified, with Jade Villalon as a frontwoman. The song is based on "Solveig's Song" from Edvard Grieg's Peer Gynt Suite. The song features Mucky as a guest vocalist, who also featured as a background vocalist in some of the other songs from the Classified album.

One of its remixes can be found on the Japanese version of the album Classified (2001). The remix, titled "Trying To Be Me (RMX)" (from the Japanese version of "Classified") is the same remix as the one found on the Europe/Korea release, which is titled "Trying To Be Me (Geo's Remix)."

== Track listing ==
Germany Single
No.	Title	Length
1.	"Trying To Be Me (Featuring Mucky) (Radio Version)"	3:08
2.	"Trying To Be Me (Featuring Mucky) (Instrumental)"	3:08
3.	"Trying To Be Me (Featuring Mucky) (A Capella)"	2:55

Korean Single
No.	Title	Length
1.	"Trying To Be Me (Featuring Mucky) (Radio Version)"	3:08
2.	"Trying To Be Me (Featuring Mucky) (Geo's Remix)"	3:21
3.	"Trying To Be Me (Featuring Mucky) (Instrumental)"	3:08
4.	"Trying To Be Me (Featuring Mucky) (A Capella)"	2:54

== Charts ==
Chart (2000)	Peak position
Germany (GfK)	63
