= Addiction (disambiguation) =

Addiction is a state that is characterized by compulsive drug use or compulsive engagement in rewarding behavior, despite negative consequences.

Addiction may also refer to:

== Music ==
- Addiction (Chico DeBarge album), 2009
- Addiction (Glenn Hughes album), 1996
- Addiction (Sakurazaka46 album), 2025
- Addiction, a 2014 album by Ganja White Night
- Addictions: Volume 1, a 1989 album by Robert Palmer
- Addictions: Volume II, a 1992 album by Robert Palmer
- "Addiction" (Medina song), 2011
- "Addiction" (Skinny Puppy song), 1987
- "Addiction" (Ryan Leslie song), 2008
- "Addiction", a song by Kanye West from his 2005 album Late Registration
- "Addiction", a song by Doja Cat from her 2019 album Hot Pink
- "Addiction", a song by Simon Townshend, from his 1985 album Moving Target
- "Addiction", a song by The Almighty, from their 1993 album Powertrippin'
- The Addiction (album), a 2006 album by rapper Fiend

== Other uses ==
- Addiction (journal), a scientific journal
- "Addiction" (CSI: Miami), an episode of the TV series CSI: Miami
- The Addiction, a 1995 vampire film by Abel Ferrara
- Addiction (film), a 2004 Finnish romantic drama film
- The Addiction (professional wrestling), a professional wrestling tag team
- Jojo Addiction, a Czech paraglider design

== See also ==
- Addicted (disambiguation)
- Addictive (disambiguation)
- The Adicts, a British punk band
- "Addict" (soundtrack), soundtrack album from the anime series FLCL
- "Addicts", 2001 episode of American sitcom Undeclared
