= We Can Work It Out (Sweetbox song) =

Single by Sweetbox

from the album The Next Generation
- Released: April 2009
- Genre: Pop, classical
- Length: 3:50
- Label: Warner Music Group; Sony BMG
- Songwriter(s): Georgie Dennis, Gavin Jones, Peter Kelleher, Ben Kohn, Tom Barnes and Jamie Pineda
- Producer(s): Derek Bramble

Sweetbox singles chronology
"Here Comes the Sun" (2006)	"We Can Work It Out" (2009)	"Crash Landed" (2009)

"We Can Work It Out" is the first hit single from pop music project Sweetbox on the album The Next Generation. It is the first song from the project to feature Jamie Pineda as frontwoman and Derek Bramble as producer. Georgie Dennis, Tom Barnes, Gavin Jones, Ben Kohn and Peter Kelleher co-wrote the song with Jamie.

"We Can Work It Out" samples The Four Seasons by Antonio Vivaldi, continuing the projects theme of fusing pop beats and classical music.

The song had somewhat high success in Japan. It reached #4 on iTunes Pop Charts in Japan and even reached the country's Billboard Hot 100 at #27.

In Korea, the song was even more successful hitting #1 on 6 major charts including Bugs and Mnet, while also reaching top 10 positions on other charts like Cyworld, Soribada and Melon. After the creation of the GAON charts, which would become Korea's official chart, the song debuted at #115 and only peaked at that number on the Overall Digital Comprehensive Chart. On the International Digital Comprehensive Chart, the song debuted and peaked at #26.

== Music video ==
The music video was directed by Martin Häusler and Martin Linss and was shot in Malibu, California. The concept of the video is that as Jamie is driving along, she notices the struggles people are enduring including that of a man and his daughter, a struggling musician and a young Japanese woman who is portrayed by model Sachi Suzuki. As she notices the struggles, she picks up each person and continues driving along. Throughout the video, Jamie is shown singing and walking along a beach.

== Track list ==
Promotional single
No.	Title	Length
1.	"We Can Work It Out"	3:46
