= Sweetbox (album) =

Studio album by Sweetbox
- Released: January 1998 (Europe) September 15, 1998 (U.S.A.)
- Genre: R&B, pop, hip hop
- Label: BMG / RCA
- Producer: Geoman; Heiko Schmidt (exec.)

Sweetbox chronology
Sweetbox (1998)	Classified (2001)

Singles from Sweetbox
- 1. "I'll Die For You" Released: 1997; 2. "Everything's Gonna Be Alright" Released: 1997; 3. "Don't Go Away" Released: 1998; 4. "Shout (Let It All Out)" Released: 1998; 5. "Sometimes" Released: 1998; 6. "U Make My Love Come Down" Released: 1999

New Edition

Everything's Gonna Be Alright

Sweetbox is the debut album of Sweetbox. It was the first and only album to have Tina Harris on vocals, and the last to have a R&B urban main influence, as Jade Villalon took over on vocals on Classified and changed the sound of Sweetbox to classical infused pop. The album, Sweetbox, was first released in January 1998 in Germany and released throughout the year in continental Europe and Asia. In North America, the album was released in September 1998 and titled Everything's Gonna Be Alright, adding newly recorded songs. In Japan, the album was reissued in that same year including two new songs which were released as singles: "Sometimes" and a Tears For Fears cover of their hit "Shout. The album reached double platinum and triple gold status in Japan and sold well in Asia but was not a big seller in Europe and America, despite having a worldwide hit single.

The most famous single from this album, "Everything's Gonna Be Alright" (based on J. S. Bach's passage Air, taken from Suite No. 3 in D major, BWV 1068) claimed top ten chart positions in France, UK, Italy, Spain, Ireland, Sweden, Austria, Switzerland, Belgium, Norway, Finland, Colombia, Lebanon and Israel. The track also stayed for 10 weeks #1 of the World Radio Charts (which is compiled of 150 radio stations in 40 countries).

== Track listing ==
All tracks are written by Geoman and Tina Harris, except where noted.

Standard Edition
No.	Title	Length
1.	"Introduction"	1:09
2.	"Don't Go Away"	3:09
3.	"Interlude"	0:20
4.	"He Loves Me"	3:19
5.	"Mama Papa"	3:35
6.	"Interlude"	0:20
7.	"Candygirl"	2:52
8.	"Everything's Gonna Be Alright"	3:11
9.	"Interlude"	0:19
10.	"Never Never"	3:19
11.	"If I Can't Have You" (Geoman, Harris, Barry Gibb, Maurice Gibb, Robin Gibb)	3:23
12.	"Get On Down"	3:03
13.	"I'll Die For You (Featuring D. Christopher Taylor)"	3:09
14.	"No No"	3:43
15.	"Here We Go Again" (Geoman, Harris, Gary Wagner)	3:22
16.	"Another Minute (Featuring D. Christopher Taylor)"	3:18
17.	"One More Time"	2:49
18.	"Don't Go Away (Brucie's 2Bad Gordie Mix)"	3:07
19.	"Everything's Gonna Be Alright (Classic Version)"	3:00

New Edition
No.	Title	Length
1.	"Sometimes"	3:36
2.	"Introduction"	1:09
3.	"Don't Go Away"	3:09
4.	"Interlude"	0:20
5.	"He Loves Me"	3:19
6.	"Mama Papa"	3:35
7.	"Interlude"	0:20
8.	"Candygirl"	2:52
9.	"Everything's Gonna Be Alright"	3:11
10.	"Interlude"	0:19
11.	"Never Never"	3:19
12.	"If I Can't Have You" (Geoman, Harris, B. Gibb, M. Gibb, R. Gibb)	3:23
13.	"Get On Down"	3:03
14.	"I'll Die For You (Featuring D. Christopher Taylor)"	3:09
15.	"No No"	3:43
16.	"Here We Go Again" (Geoman, Harris, Gary Wagner)	3:22
17.	"Another Minute (Featuring D. Christopher Taylor)"	3:18
18.	"One More Time"	2:49
19.	"Shout (Let It All Out) (Featuring D. Christopher Taylor)" (Roland Orzabal, Ian Stanley)	3:05
20.	"Don't Go Away (Brucie's 2Bad Gordie Mix)"	3:07
21.	"Everything's Gonna Be Alright (Classic Version)"	3:00
22.	"I'll Die For You (Featuring D. Christopher Taylor) (Smooth Radio Mix)"	3:11

Everything's Gonna Be Alright
No.	Title	Length
1.	"Don't Go Away"	3:09
2.	"He Loves Me"	3:19
3.	"Mama Papa"	3:35
4.	"Everything's Gonna Be Alright"	3:11
5.	"If I Can't Have You" (Geoman, Harris, B. Gibb, M. Gibb, R. Gibb)	3:23
6.	"U Make My Love Come Down (Featuring Evelyn Champagne King)"	3:13
7.	"Never Never"	3:19
8.	"Get On Down"	3:03
9.	"Never Wanna Be Alone"	3:09
10.	"Sometimes"	3:36
11.	"I'll Die For You (Featuring D. Christopher Taylor)"	3:09

== Credits ==
- Produced by GEO.
- Published by Edition Parasongs/EMI Music Publishing except for 'If I Can't Have You' published by UFA Musikverlage.
- Mastered by Bernie Grundman, Hollywood, CA (USA).
- Executive producer: Heiko Schmidt.

== Samples ==
- "Everything's Gonna Be Alright" samples 'Air on a G String (Suite No.3)' from J.S Bach
- "Don't Go Away" samples 'Adagio in G minor' from Tomaso Albinoni

== Charts ==
Chart (1998)	Peak position
Austrian Albums (Ö3 Austria)	37
German Albums (Offizielle Top 100)	76
Japanese Albums Chart	28
Norwegian Albums (VG-lista)	34
Spanish Albums Chart	47
Swedish Albums (Sverigetopplistan)	49
Swiss Albums (Schweizer Hitparade)	38

== Certifications ==
Region	Certification	Certified units/sales
Japan (RIAJ)	2× Platinum	400,000^{^}
^{^} Shipments figures based on certification alone.
