= Everything Is Nothing =

"Everything is Nothing"

Single by Sweetbox

from the album The Next Generation
- Released: February 2010
- Genre: Pop
- Length: 3:40
- Label: Warner Music Group; Sony BMG
- Songwriter(s): Hanne Sorvaag, Harry Sommerdahl & Jade MacRae
- Producer(s): Derek Bramble

Sweetbox singles chronology
"Crash Landed" (2009)	"Everything is Nothing" (2010)	"Remember This Dance" (2011)

"Everything is Nothing" is the third overall single from pop music project Sweetbox on the album The Next Generation, featuring Jamie Pineda as frontwoman. It is the second single in Korea, but the third overall single from the album. The song is also the first single from the album to not be co-wrote by Pineda. Hanne Sorvaag, Harry Sommerdahl & Jade McRae wrote the song.

Released in February 2010, the song debuted at #141 on GAON's Overall Digital Comprehensive Chart and has so far peaked at #70. On the GAON's International Digital Comprehensive Chart, the song debuted at #20 and peaked at #3. Although it had no official single release in Japan, the song reached #7 on iTunes Pop charts.

The song is featured in the Korean version of Audition Online.

== Track list ==
Digital single
No.	Title	Length
1.	"Everything is Nothing"	3:40
