= Crash Landed =

Single by Sweetbox

from the album The Next Generation
- B-side: "We Can Work It Out (Wedding Mix)"
- Released: July 2009
- Genre: Pop, R&B, Classical, Dance
- Length: 2:57
- Label: Warner Music Group; Sony BMG
- Songwriters: Georgie Dennis, Gavin Jones, Peter Kelleher, Ben Kohn, Tom Barnes & Jamie Pineda
- Producer: Derek Bramble

Sweetbox singles chronology
"We Can Work It Out" (2009)	"Crash Landed" (2009)	"Everything is Nothing" (2010)

"Crash Landed" is the second single from pop music project Sweetbox on the album The Next Generation, featuring Jamie Pineda as frontwoman. Georgie Dennis, Tom Barnes, Gavin Jones, Ben Kohn and Peter Kelleher co-wrote the song with Jamie.

The song samples Bach's Toccata & Fuge in D minor.

Crash Landed was released in Japan as the second single in July 2009 and the third single in Korea in April 2010. The Korean digital download also included the Wedding Mix of We Can Work It Out. While Crash Landed had no major success in Japan on charts like the single prior to it, the song received quite a bit of radio play. In Korea the song peaked at #12 on the International Gaon Charts.

== Music video ==
The Crash Landed video premiered on July 28, 2009, and featured a new mix in the song for the video. Like Jamie's first video for We Can Work It Out, this too was directed by Martin Häusler and Martin Linss. The concept of the video features Jamie in an elevator while it presumably crashes down. The video also features four back-up dancers in the background while Jamie sings in front of them.

== Track list ==
Promotional single
No.	Title	Length
1.	"Crash Landed"	2:57
2.	"We Can Work It Out (Wedding mix)"	3:53
