= Ateed =

German singer

- Born: Ateed

Ateed is a German singer, born to a Turkish Western Thracian mother and Iranian father. She has only recorded songs in English, and is probably best known for singing the songs, "Come to Me" and "I Want It All", on the Pringles advertisements.

"Come to Me" peaked at No.56 in the UK Singles Chart in October 2003.

== Discography ==
- Ateed

Track listing

- 01. "One Day"
- 02. "I Want It All"
- 03. "Come To Me"
- 04. "Sorry"
- 05. "The System"
- 06. "Too Bad"
- 07. "I Can't Believe It"
- 08. "She Lost Her Smile"
- 09. "Thank You"
- 10. "Spit Out"
- 11. "Fades Away"
- 12. "When Will I See"
- 13. "On My Way"
- 14. "I Just Wanna Know"

All tracks written and composed by Ateed and Geoman, except No. 4 by K. Rethwisch, Ch. Langton, M. Weber, and A. Petrow, No.7 by Ateed, Geoman, Eran Tabib, and Gabriel Dorman, and No.13 by Ateed, Geoman, and Jade Villalon.
