= Adagio (Sweetbox album) =

Studio album by Sweetbox
- Released: February 4, 2004
- Genres: Pop; classical crossover; R&B
- Length: 55:24 (Special edition); 42:19 (European edition)
- Label: Avex Trax
- Producer: Roberto Geo Rosan

Sweetbox chronology
| Jade (2002) | Adagio (2004) | After The Lights (2004) |

Singles from Adagio
- 1. "Life Is Cool" Released: 2004; 2. "Somewhere" Released: 2004

Adagio is the fourth album of Sweetbox and the third album with Jade Villalon as frontwoman. It was released in 2004, in two different versions. One was released in Japan, debuting at #3, and the other was released in Europe, South Korea and Taiwan. The album was heavily inspired by world music, with songs sampling music originating from around the globe. The album also saw a hip-hop influence, furthered by guest vocalist RJ. Many of the songs showcased a far more personal approach from Jade's songwriting, dealing with topics such as spirituality and accepting the death of loved ones.

The album also contains the extended versions of "Real Emotion" and "1000 Words", which Villalon recorded for the English/international version of Final Fantasy X-2.

The track 'Chyna Girl' was originally written by Jade and Geo, for the pop group S.H.E.

== Track listing ==
All tracks are written by Geoman and Jade Villalon, except where noted.

Standard Edition
| No. | Title | Length |
|---|---|---|
| 1. | "Liberty (Featuring RJ)" | 3:22 |
| 2. | "Life Is Cool" | 2:48 |
| 3. | "Somewhere" | 2:53 |
| 4. | "Hate Without Frontiers" | 3:23 |
| 5. | "Far Away" | 3:13 |
| 6. | "Testimony (Featuring RJ)" | 3:41 |
| 7. | "I'll Be There (Featuring RJ)" | 3:16 |
| 8. | "Lacrimosa (Featuring RJ)" | 3:00 |
| 9. | "Sorry" | 3:24 |
| 10. | "I Don't Wanna Be (Featuring Nicco)" (Geoman, Villalon, A. Loeser, T. Loose) | 3:24 |
| 11. | "Chyna Girl" | 3:14 |
| 12. | "Everybody (Featuring Meguo)" | 3:08 |

Japanese Edition
| No. | Title | Length |
|---|---|---|
| 13. | "Miss You" | 3:21 |
| 14. | "You Can't Hide" | 3:07 |

Special Bonus Edition
| No. | Title | Length |
|---|---|---|
| 13. | "Miss You" | 3:21 |
| 14. | "You Can't Hide" | 3:07 |
| 15. | "1000 Words (from Final Fantasy X-2)" (Kazushige Nojima) | 5:57 |
| 16. | "Real Emotion (from Final Fantasy X-2)" (Kenn Kato) | 4:03 |

European Edition
| No. | Title | Length |
|---|---|---|
| 1. | "Beautiful" | 3:23 |
| 2. | "Life Is Cool" | 2:48 |
| 3. | "Somewhere" | 2:53 |
| 4. | "Hate Without Frontiers" | 3:23 |
| 5. | "Testimony (Featuring RJ)" | 3:41 |
| 6. | "Liberty (Featuring RJ)" | 3:22 |
| 7. | "Far Away" | 3:13 |
| 8. | "Lacrimosa (Featuring RJ)" | 3:00 |
| 9. | "Sorry" | 3:24 |
| 10. | "I'll Be There (Featuring RJ)" | 3:16 |
| 11. | "Chyna Girl" | 3:14 |
| 12. | "Everybody (Featuring Meguo)" | 3:08 |
| 13. | "I Don't Wanna Be (Featuring Nicco)" (Geoman, Villalon, A. Loeser, T. Loose) | 3:34 |

Korean Edition
| No. | Title | Length |
|---|---|---|
| 1. | "Beautiful" | 3:22 |
| 2. | "Life Is Cool" | 2:48 |
| 3. | "Somewhere" | 2:53 |
| 4. | "Hate Without Frontiers" | 3:23 |
| 5. | "Testimony (Featuring RJ)" | 3:41 |
| 6. | "Far Away" | 3:12 |
| 7. | "Liberty (Featuring RJ)" | 3:25 |
| 8. | "Lacrimosa (Featuring RJ)" | 3:00 |
| 9. | "Sorry" | 3:24 |
| 10. | "I'll Be There (Featuring RJ)" | 3:16 |
| 11. | "Chyna Girl" | 3:14 |
| 12. | "Everybody (Featuring Meguo)" | 3:08 |
| 13. | "I Don't Wanna Be (Featuring Nicco)" (Geoman, Villalon, A. Loeser, T. Loose) | 3:34 |

== Credits ==
- Bass Guitar – Oliver Poschmann
- Drums – Bertil, Robbie Siemens
- Engineer – Toby Breitenbach
- Mixed By – Geoman
- Vocals [Rap] – Nicco, RJ, Meguo

== Samples ==
- "Far Away" samples 'Oboe Concerto in D Minor' from Marcello
- "Hate Without Frontiers" samples 'Stabat Mater' from Giovanni Battista Pergolesi
- "Life Is Cool" samples 'Canon in D Major' from Johann Pachelbel
- "Miss You" samples 'Pomp & Circumstance' from Sir Edward Elgar
- "Somewhere" samples 'Ave Maria' from J.S Bach & C. Gounod
- "Sorry" samples Palladio by Karl Jenkins
- "Testimony" samples 'Cradle Song' from Grieg
- "You Can't Hide" samples 'Hannah and Her Sisters' from J.S Bach
- "Lacrimosa" samples 'Lacrimosa' from Mozart
- "Liberty" samples Kyrie (from Requiem) from Mozart

== Certifications ==
| Region | Certification | Certified units/sales |
|---|---|---|
| Japan (RIAJ) | Gold | 100,000^{^} |
^{^} Shipments figures based on certification alone.
