= Tina Harris =

American rapper

- Born: April 23, 1975 (age 51); Maryland, United States
- Genres: R&B, hip hop
- Occupations: Singer, rapper
- Years active: 1997–present
- Labels: RCA, Sony, Columbia
- Website: www.tinaharris.com

Tina Harris (born April 23, 1975), is an American singer best known for being a member of Sweetbox.

== Career ==
=== Early life ===
Tina Harris was born in Baltimore, Maryland, and due to her military father being stationed there, the whole family moved to Frankfurt, West Germany, when she was four and grew up there.

Tina Harris's start in the music industry came when her cousin, rapper Turbo B of the music group Snap! chose Harris's sister Jackie to mime on the videoclip and on promotional appearances to the female parts of their hit "The Power". Later, Tina Harris and her other sister Angel became dancers on Snap!'s tour and in videoclips, first appearing in the videoclip for "Ooops Up".

In 1991, the three Harris sisters left Snap! and formed the pop-rap group B.O.Y. (an acronym for Because Of You), which was active for two years. Sister Angel left in 1992 after the release of the second single and Tina and Jackie carried on as a duo for two more singles.

After meeting singer Liza da Costa, Harris and her sister Jackie formed a Eurodance trio with her called Security for about two years in 1993–1995. Afterwards, Harris lent vocals to a few Eurodance records in the mid-90s.

=== Sweetbox ===
In 1997, Harris was contacted by Sweetbox producer Roberto "Geo" Rosan to record vocals for the group's next single "I'll Die For You". While the single was not a big hit, it landed the group a record deal with RCA records. Rosan decided to settle with Harris a lead vocalist of the group and the group's next single, co-written by Harris, "Everything's Gonna Be Alright", released in late 1997 in Germany and in 1998 in the rest of the world, went immediately into the top of the charts.

This track, which fuses urban music and hip-hop with Johann Sebastian Bach's Air (from Orchestral Suite No. 3, claimed Top Ten Chart positions in England, Ireland, Sweden, Austria, Switzerland, Belgium, Norway, Finland, Spain, Colombia, Lebanon, Israel, Italy and France. In Germany (#12), Denmark (#13) and the Netherlands the title reached the Top 20 and in the US the Single was among the Top 40 on the Billboard Charts. The track also stayed for 8 weeks in the Top 10 of the World Radio Charts (which is compiled of 150 radio stations in 40 countries).

The first album of the band released in 1998 was called "Sweetbox" in Europe and Asia and "Everything's Gonna Be Alright" in North America. In Japan the album reached double platinum and triple gold status and Sweetbox was awarded 2 Japanese Grammies in the categories "Best International Artist" and "Best Song of the Year". The album was released in 47 countries and sold in total nearly 3 million copies and Harris toured with Britney Spears and NSYNC.

=== After Sweetbox ===
After spending two and a half years promoting the record all over the world, Harris tried to renegotiate the very prohibitive contract she had unknowingly signed for the group's second album. Instead of relenting, the record label and Rosan decided to replace her with a new vocalist, Jade Villalon.

The contract prevented her from releasing music for 8 years, although in 2003 Harris released her debut solo album "Love Makes The World Go Round", thanks to Sony Music Japan, which managed to license her recording specifically for the Japanese market. When the contract was terminated, Harris released the album around the world digitally in 2007, retitling it "Sunshine" and adding the title track and a new version of "Everything's Gonna Be Alright" as new songs.

In January 2016, Harris released her second solo album "Free To Love".

==== Love Makes the World Go Round ====
Love Makes the World Go Round

Studio album by Tina Harris
- Released: May 26, 2003
- Genre: R'n'B
- Label: Sony, Columbia

Harris released her only solo album entitled Love Makes the World Go Round on May 26, 2003.

Track listing:

1. Intro – "Love Makes the World Go Round"
2. "Ooh Baby"
3. "Crush on You"
4. "Who's That Guy"
5. "I Feel You Feel Me"
6. "Apartment 424"
7. "Falling 4 U"
8. "Do You Love Me"
9. "Can I Be Your Sunshine"
10. "My First Love"
11. "On My Mind" (featuring Kevin Tyson)
12. "Love Makes the World Go Round"
13. "Do You Really Want to Hurt Me"
14. "I'll Do 4 U" (featuring Kevin Tyson)
15. "Still-N-Love" (featuring Damon Elliott)
16. "I Tried"
17. "Outro" – Lullaby for JKJ
18. "Ooh Baby" (Royal Philharmonic Orchestra Mix)
19. "Do You Really Want to Hurt Me" (Classic Mix)
20. "Who's That Guy" (Raw Flava Mix)
