= Complete Best (Sweetbox album) =

Greatest hits album by Sweetbox
- Released: 12 December 2007
- Recorded: 1995–2006
- Genre: Pop; classical; dance; electronic
- Label: Avex Casa
- Producer: Roberto Geo Rosan

Sweetbox chronology
Greatest Hits (2007)	Complete Best (2007)	Rare Tracks (2008)

Complete Best is a compilation album by Sweetbox released on 12 December 2007. It came packaged as two discs, the first entitled Classic Flavors, the second Fan Flavors. First press editions of the album came presented in another box bearing the same artwork as the album.

== Track listing ==
Disc 1 [Classic Flavors]

1. "Everything's Gonna Be Alright"
2. "For The Lonely" (Geo's Remix)
3. "Life Is Cool"
4. "Addicted"
5. "Cinderella"
6. "Here Comes The Sun"
7. "Superstar"
8. "Don't Go Away" (Radio Version)
9. "Everything's Gonna Be Alright" (Jade's Version)
10. "Don't Push Me"
11. "Hate Without Frontiers"
12. "Sorry"
13. "Sacred"
14. "Testimony"
15. "Human Sacrifice"
16. "Lacrimosa"
17. "Somewhere"
18. "Crazy"
19. "Liberty"
20. "Trying To Be Me"
21. "Read My Mind"
22. "Miss You"
23. "Everything's Gonna Be Alright -Reborn-

Disc 2 [Fan Flavors]

1. "Shout (Let It All Out)" (Radio Version)
2. "Life Is Cool" (Futah Remix)
3. "Boyfriend"
4. "That Night"
5. "A Whole New World"
6. "Real Emotion"
7. "Bold & Delicious"
8. "Pride"
9. "Every Time" (All Grown Up Version)
10. "Booyah, Here We Go" (Hot Pants Radio Mix)
11. "Crown Of Thorns"
12. "Over & Over"
13. "Killing Me DJ"
14. "After The Lights"
15. "Shakalaka" (Video Version)
16. "Chyna Girl"
17. "Beautiful"
18. "The Winner Takes It All"
19. "Every Step"
20. "Vaya Con Dios"
21. "Time of My Life"
22. "Read My Mind" (Crystal Edition)

== Certifications ==
Region	Certification	Certified units/sales
Japan (RIAJ)	Gold	100,000^{^}
^{^} Shipments figures based on certification alone.
