= Jade (Sweetbox album) =

Studio album by Sweetbox
- Released: 2002 (Standard Edition); 2003 (Silver Edition)
- Genre: Pop; classical crossover; R&B
- Length: 39:16 (12 song version); 39:21 (Silver Edition)
- Label: Paramedia
- Producer: Roberto Geo Rosan

Sweetbox chronology
Classified (2001)	Jade (2002)	Adagio (2004)

Singles from Jade
- 1. "Read My Mind" Released: 2002; 2. "Here On My Own (Lighter Shade Of Blue)" Released: 2002

Jade is the third album of Sweetbox and the second with Jade Villalon as a frontwoman. It was released in 2002 in Japan and Europe, 2003 in Taiwan, and 2004 in Korea. Although similar to Classified, the album saw new influences emerging, and showcased a number of tracks, such as "Lighter Shade of Blue", that had not sampled famous classical pieces.

A year later, a Silver edition was released with acoustic versions of some of the songs, including remixes and the re-vamped, re-done version of "Lighter Shade of Blue" that was featured on the "Here on My Own" music video, and a bonus DVD with three music videos.

== Track listing ==
All tracks are written by Geoman and Jade Villalon, except where noted.

Standard Edition
No.	Title	Length
1.	"Human Sacrifice"	3:19
2.	"Read My Mind"	3:05
3.	"Unforgiven"	3:18
4.	"Lighter Shade Of Blue"	3:49
5.	"Utopia"	3:00
6.	"Don't Push Me"	3:14
7.	"On The Radio"	3:12
8.	"Alright"	3:02
9.	"Stay" (Siobhan Fahey, Marcella Detroid, David A. Stewart)	3:32
10.	"Falling"	3:58
11.	"Fool Again"	3:04
12.	"Easy Come, Easy Go"	2:52
Total length:		39:16

Japanese Edition
No.	Title	Length
13.	"Always on My Mind" (Johnny Christopher, Mark James, Wayne Carson)	2:48
14.	"One Kiss (Acoustic Version)"	3:17

Taiwanese Edition
No.	Title	Length
13.	"Read My Mind (Acoustic Version)"	3:24
14.	"Unforgiven (Geo's Mix)"	3:19

Silver Edition
No.	Title	Length
1.	"Alright"	3:04
2.	"Don't Push Me"	3:26
3.	"Utopia"	3:00
4.	"Lighter Shade Of Blue"	3:52
5.	"Not Your Doctor"	3:43
6.	"Human Sacrifice"	3:05
7.	"Unforgiven"	3:00
8.	"Easy Come, Easy Go"	2:43
9.	"Read My Mind (Acoustic Version)"	3:23
10.	"Unforgiven (Geo's Mix)"	3:16
11.	"Here On My Own (Lighter Shade Of Blue)"	3:32
12.	"Read My Mind (Jazztronic Mix)"	3:19
Total length:		39:21

Video Clips DVD
No.	Title	Length
1.	"Read My Mind"
2.	"Unforgiven"
3.	"Here On My Own (Lighter Shade Of Blue)"

== Credits ==
Standard Edition

- Backing Vocals - Denise, Mucky
- Executive Producer – Heiko Schmidt
- Vocals - Jade Villalon
- Mixed By - Geoman

Silver Edition

- Guitar - Geo
- Guitar, Mandolin - Holger Düchting
- Guitar (Bass) - Oliver Poschmann
- Guitars, Backing Vocals - Toby Breitenbach
- Percussion - Tilman Bruno
- Producer - Geoman
- Backing Vocals - Denise
- Written By - Geoman, Villalon

== Samples ==
- "Human Sacrifice" samples 'Pavane (Fauré)' from Gabriel Fauré
- "Don't Push Me" samples 'Moonlight Sonata' from Beethoven
- "Read My Mind" samples 'Cavalleria Rusticana' from Pietro Mascagni
- "Sacred" samples 'Boléro' from Maurice Ravel

== Certifications ==
Region	Certification	Certified units/sales
Japan (RIAJ)	Gold	100,000^{^}
^{^} Shipments figures based on certification alone.
