= Addicted (Sweetbox album) =

Studio album by Sweetbox
- Released: March 16, 2006
- Genre: Electropop
- Length: 43:46
- Label: Sony Music
- Producer: Roberto Geo Rosan

Sweetbox studio albums chronology
After The Lights (2004)	Addicted (2006)	The Next Generation (2009)

Singles from Addicted
- 1. "Addicted" Released: 2006; 2. "Here Comes The Sun" Released: 2006

Addicted is the sixth studio album of Sweetbox. It was released on March 1, 2006, in Japan. The first press edition included a cardboard slipcase. In Japan the album sold over 100,000 copies and reached the Gold Status. The Korean version of the album includes a bonus DVD featuring five live performances. The album saw a return to the upbeat, dance sounds of the Jade album, while incorporating newer musical trends. The album also saw a return to sampling famous classical pieces, heard on 'Addicted' and 'Here Comes The Sun'.

Five of the tracks featured on Addicted were composed by Jade and Geo for Ayumi Hamasaki to release. While Ayumi Hamasaki re-wrote the lyrics (also writing them in Japanese), and re-arranged the songs with many vocal melodies original to her for her own renditions, the versions released on Addicted contain the original compositions, lyrics, and vocal melodies written by Jade and Geo. Hamasaki's versions appear on her album (Miss)understood.

Addicted sold 121,397 copies and became the 111th best-selling album of 2006.

== Track listing ==
All tracks are written by Geoman and Jade Villalon, except "The Winner Takes It All" by Benny Andersson and Björn Ulvaeus.

Standard Edition
No.	Title	Length
1.	"Graceland"	3:37
2.	"Addicted"	2:52
3.	"Here Comes The Sun"	3:09
4.	"Pride"	3:26
5.	"Bold & Delicious"	3:11
6.	"Every Step"	2:49
7.	"Break Down"	3:03
8.	"Dreams"	2:52
9.	"Ladies Night"	3:14
10.	"Beautiful Girl"	3:22
11.	"Over & Over"	3:21
12.	"Million Miles"	2:24

Korean Edition
No.	Title	Length
13.	"Addicted (Featuring DJ BO & InDJaction Crew) (Boom Boom Remix)"	3:42
14.	"Addicted (Pot Black Dirty Mix)"	3:54

European Edition
No.	Title	Length
13.	"Addicted (Featuring DJ BO & InDJaction Crew) (Boom Boom Remix)"	3:42
14.	"Addicted (Featuring ATD & Da Rich Crew) (Rich Rich Remix)"	4:08
15.	"The Winner Takes It All (Hidden Track)"	4:35

Japanese Edition
No.	Title	Length
1.	"Graceland"	3:37
2.	"Addicted"	2:52
3.	"Here Comes the Sun"	3:09
4.	"Pride"	3:26
5.	"Bold & Delicious"	3:11
6.	"Every Step"	2:49
7.	"Break Down"	3:03
8.	"Dreams"	2:52
9.	"Ladies Night"	3:14
10.	"Vaya Con Dios"	2:49
11.	"Beautiful Girl"	3:22
12.	"Over & Over"	3:21
13.	"Happy Tears"	3:39
14.	"Million Miles"	2:24

Bonus DVD (Live in Seoul)
No.	Title	Length
1.	"Graceland"
2.	"Don't Push Me"
3.	"Pride"
4.	"Addicted"
5.	"Here Comes The Sun"

== Samples ==
- "Here Comes The Sun" samples Johann Sebastian Bach's Prelude No. 1.
- "Addicted" samples Vivaldi's The Four Seasons.

== Certifications ==
Region	Certification	Certified units/sales
Japan (RIAJ)	Gold	100,000^{^}
^{^} Shipments figures based on certification alone.
