= Sweetbox =

German pop music project

- Origin: Germany
- Genres: Pop; hip hop; dance; classical; R&B
- Years active: 1995–present
- Labels: Avex Trax (present); Sony Music; Warner Music Group; Paramusic Corporation
- Members: Jade Villalon (2000–2007, 2017, 2020); Roberto "Geo" Rosan (1995–2007, 2017, 2020); Saint Viv (2020)
- Past members: Kimberley Kearney (1995); Dacia Bridges (1995–1996); Tina Harris (1997–1999); Featured D. Christopher Taylor (1996-1998); Jamie Pineda (2007–2012); Miho Fukuhara (2013–2017); LogiQ Pryce (2013–2017
- Website: www.sweetbox.com

Sweetbox is a German-based pop music project formed in 1995 by executive producer Heiko Schmidt and music producer Roberto "Geo" Rosan. Throughout the years Sweetbox has had several lead singers including Kimberly Kearney, Dacia Bridges, Tina Harris, Jade Villalon, Jamie Pineda, Miho Fukuhara, LogiQ Pryce, and Saint Viv.

Although the project released four singles in the mid-1990s, with initial singers Kimberley Kearney and Dacia Bridges, worldwide success came with third vocalist, Tina Harris. "Everything's Gonna Be Alright" was released in 1997, which topped charts around the world and started a musical theme, sampling classical music, which the project would later become known for.

Tina Harris left after two years, with Jade Villalon replacing her as the fourth vocalist with five original albums, all reaching Gold or Platinum in South Korea. Villalon, along with "Geo" left the project after seven years to go on and do other projects.

Vocalist Jamie Pineda took the role as new vocalist shortly after in late 2007 and released her first studio album The Next Generation in 2009, which was produced by Derek Bramble. Pineda released one more album, Diamond Veil, in 2011 and it was released in Japan and South Korea, as the 8th studio album from Sweetbox.

In 2013, Japanese singer Miho Fukuhara became the new frontwoman and for the first time in the project's history, male vocalist/rapper LogiQ Pryce would co-front the project with her. The studio album, titled #Z21 was released on July 3, 2013.

In 2020, GEO and Jade came back to Sweetbox, joined by new member Saint Viv. They released a new album, Da Capo, and a new compilation, Happy Wedding Complete Best on February 26, 2020.

== History ==
=== Beginnings ===
In 1995, Sweetbox was founded as a music project from executive producer Heiko Schmidt and music producer, songwriter, and classical arranger, Roberto "Geo" Rosan. The first vocalist featured in the project was Atlanta-based rapper and singer, Kimberley Kearney, also known as Tempest. Her first single with the project, "Booyah (Here We Go)", was a Eurodance track which created initial success for Sweetbox in Germany, where the single achieved #8 in position, and in France, where it achieved #15. Kearney left the project soon thereafter to pursue other ventures in the entertainment industry including a number of hosting gigs.

After Kearney's short-lived position at front woman, Dacia Bridges replaced her. Bridges, a native of Michigan, released her first single as the project's frontwoman – the 1995 single "Shakalaka", which peaked at #1 on the New York City Club Charts for 3 weeks. She released Sweetbox's third single titled "Wot", but the single failed to see success. Bridges departed and later started a band titled Dacia And The WMD. In 1996, Kimberly Kearney started working with Geo once again to release an additional single, "Never Alone", although this would end the partnership permanently.

=== Tina Harris ===
In 1997, Geo met Maryland-based rapper and singer, Tina Harris, who became the new face of Sweetbox. With Tina's arrival to the project, the group saw a change in genre from Eurodance to hip hop and pop-meets-classical. Tina's first single, "I'll Die For You" was released in 1997 featuring D. Christopher Taylor and achieved most of its airplay in Europe. The next single, "Everything's Gonna Be Alright", became an international hit.

The hip hop song sampled Air on the G string from Suite No. 3 by Johann Sebastian Bach, and became a worldwide hit. It reached Top 10 positions in the charts of Austria, Belgium, the UK, Colombia, Finland, France, Ireland, Israel, Italy, Lebanon, Norway, Spain, Sweden and Switzerland. The composition also reached Top 20 positions in Denmark, Germany and the Netherlands, and reached to the Top 40 in the United States. It stayed #1 on the Worldwide Airplay Chart for 10 weeks.

Following the success, Harris went on to release four additional singles and released the first full-length self titled album, in 1998, which reached #1 on charts in Japan, and was awarded two Japanese Grammies for Best Song and the Best Newcomer. Sweetbox toured the US, opening and playing with various American pop groups. At the end of 1998, feeling burnt out as a team, Harris left the project forcing Schmidt and Rosan to find a new replacement. Harris released an album after her departure, under her own name, and began writing for several acts.

=== Jade Villalon ===
==== Classified and Jade ====
In 1999, the Sweetbox team Heiko Schmidt and Roberto "Geo" Rosan discovered and hired Jade Villalon, an aspiring singer/songwriter and actress to front the project.

In autumn of 2000, Villalon's first single with the project, entitled "Trying To Be Me", was released. The song featured back-up vocalist Mucky and was primarily promoted in Europe, although the single was also released in South Korea. The first album with Villalon, titled Classified, was released in 2000, and featured diverse genres of pop, dance and rock, each song also incorporating classical pieces by Beethoven, Ennio Morricone and others. The release received platinum certification in Japan. The second album with Villalon as vocalist, Jade, was released in Asia in 2002, and featured two singles. The first single "Lighter Shade of Blue" remained #1 on Europe's various charts for four consecutive weeks. An acoustic version of the Villalon album was released under the name Jade (Silver Edition), featuring the version of "Lighter Shade of Blue" that had topped the European charts.

==== Adagio and After The Lights ====
Villalon's third album with Sweetbox, Adagio, was released in 2004. The nature of the album was much darker than things from the singer's past albums. The album featured a theme of sampling world music as opposed to primarily European classical, and saw a lyrically and musically darker aspect to the group's sound. The Japanese Edition of the album featured bonus tracks real "Emotion" and "1,000 Words", compositions that Villalon had vocalized for the video game Final Fantasy X-2. The album's featured a single, "Life Is Cool", becoming known for featuring Johann Pachelbel's Canon in D.

Between the release of Villalon's fourth and fifth albums, Sweetbox released a compilation, 13 Chapters, in 2004, which contained a number of songs from Adagio and from their upcoming album, which was released shortly after. The album After the Lights was released in 2005, and was released again as a version entitled Sweetbox Presents A Very Sweet X-Mas, featuring Christmas Carols as bonus tracks. The singles from the album were After The Lights, "Killing Me DJ", "More Than Love", and "This Christmas". The first single, "Killing Me DJ", featured vocalist Toby Breitenbach.

==== Addicted and Villalon's Departure ====
Through 2005 and 2006, Sweetbox held a live tour titled The 10th Anniversary Tour, in Japan, and The Bold & Delicious Tour in South Korea. To celebrate the 10th anniversary of Sweetbox, a compilation album titled Best of Sweetbox was released in 2005, achieving a double platinum status, also reaching #1 on Oricon's International Charts in Japan. It became the 73rd best selling album of 2005 in Asia. Later that same year, the music magazine Fono awarded Sweetbox the No. 1 Cross-Border Artist title. A new compilation album titled Raw Treasures Volume 1 was released the same year. The album featured demo versions of Sweetbox songs, and unreleased songs from Villalon.

Sweetbox's next full-length studio album, Addicted, was released in the beginning of 2006. The album received moderate success in Japan, but was highly successful in South Korea, becoming the Asia's 111th best-selling album of the year. The album featured a number of songs that Villalon and Geo had initially written for Ayumi Hamasaki, who by this time had released Japanese-language versions with her own written lyrics, and the album also achieved Gold in status, with the highest sales for a Sweetbox album. Following Villalon's fifth studio album, a live album containing a DVD and CD of a Villalon's latest tour was released. After this, a number of compilations, including two remix albums, were distributed.

In late 2006, Villalon left the Sweetbox project. In 2007, Roberto "Geo" Rosan also decided to quit his work for the project and sold his part of ownership to executive producer Heiko Schmidt.

=== Jamie Pineda ===
==== The Next Generation and Diamond Veil ====
After Villalon and Rosan's departure, Heiko Schmidt started working closely with music executive Hayden Bell, who discovered The Veronicas, and Andre Recke – the longtime manager of Hilary Duff. After 3,000 auditions, then 18-year-old Jamie Pineda became the projects fifth front woman and was marketed as 'The Next Generation' of Sweetbox. Pineda started writing and recording for her first studio album in September 2007, the same month she turned 19. Unlike the previous singers of the project, Pineda co-wrote around the globe with several writers for her debut album including Georgie Dennis, Toby Gad and Derek Bramble, who would go on to produce Pineda's first Sweetbox album.

After almost two years in the works, the album's lead single "We Can Work It Out" was released to Japan in April 2009. The song sampled "Spring" from The Four Seasons by Vivaldi, confirming that the project would continue on with the trend of fusing classical music with pop beats. The single had great success in South Korea and Japan, hitting #4 on iTunes Pop Charts in Japan and even reaching the country's Billboard Hot 100 at #27. The album, titled The Next Generation, was released in Japan under the Warner Music Japan label in June 2009 and in South Korea under the Sony BMG label in November 2009. The Next Generation was well received in Japan, where two singles were released and had greater success in South Korea, where three singles were released. In Japan the album hit #4 on the Oricon International Charts and in Korea it hit several charts including a 4-week stay on Bugs and 5 other #1's on Soribada, Mnet, Daum, Naver and SKT NATE RT.

In January 2010, Schmidt announced that Pineda had finished writing for the album and that the second release from Pineda would be recorded in the coming months and would be released in the second quarter of 2010. He stated that the new album would feature "more uptempo and high energetic songs" then the projects previous release. In February 2010, Pineda traveled to Sweden and began work on the album. That May it was announced via Pineda's Twitter that the album would be released in September 2010. The album release was subsequently postponed. On February 23, 2011, Pineda announced via her Facebook page that her new album, Diamond Veil, will be released physically on April 27, 2011, in Japan. The album received mainly positive reviews but failed to chart well. Pineda left Sweetbox quietly in 2012.

=== Miho Fukuhara and LogiQ Pryce ===
==== Auditions, Reveal and #Z21 ====
In the Fall of 2012, the Sweetbox website reported with a message that there would be an open casting call to find a Japanese female artist to front the project. The project called upon fans to create their own music video – the winning contestant then was flown out in April to be a part of a music video shoot. It was announced in May 2013 that Japanese singer-songwriter Miho Fukuhara would join Antiguan vocalist/hip hop artist-songwriter LogiQ Pryce, making it the first time that two individuals would lead Sweetbox and also the first time that a male vocalist would be included.

Along with the reveal, the title of the album #Zeitgeist21 respective #Z21 was revealed.

On July 3, 2013, Sweetbox's 9th studio album #Z21 was released in Japan as well as digitally worldwide. The album was the lowest selling album in Sweetbox history.

== Discography ==
- Sweetbox (1998)
- Classified (2001)
- Jade (2002)
- Adagio (2004)
- After The Lights (2004)
- Addicted (2006)
- The Next Generation (2009)
- Diamond Veil (2011)
- #Z21 (2013)
- Da Capo (2020)

== Awards ==
- 1998 Japan Gold Disc Award - New Artist of the Year (International Division)
