= Everything's Gonna Be Alright (Sweetbox song) =

1997 single by Sweetbox

Single by Sweetbox

from the album Sweetbox
- Released: 3 October 1997
- Genre: Hip hop
- Length: 3:11
- Label: RCA; BMG
- Composer: Johann Sebastian Bach
- Lyricists: Geoman; Tina Harris
- Producer: Geo

Sweetbox singles chronology
"I'll Die for You" (1997)	"Everything's Gonna Be Alright" (1997)	"Don't Go Away" (1998)

Music video
- "Everything's Gonna Be Alright" on YouTube

"Everything's Gonna Be Alright" is a song by German-based music group Sweetbox. It was released in October 1997 as the second single from their debut album, Sweetbox (1998). It was the only album that had American singer Tina Harris as the group's frontwoman, and she also co-wrote the song. It is based on "Air" from Johann Sebastian Bach's Orchestral Suite No. 3, played on the track by the German Symphony Orchestra.

"Everything's Gonna Be Alright" is the most successful song of Sweetbox worldwide; it reached the top five in Austria, France, Iceland, Ireland, Norway, Spain, Sweden, and the United Kingdom. Outside Europe, the song peaked at number 46 on the US Billboard Hot 100. The accompanying music video was directed by Patrick Kiely.

== Critical reception ==
Larry Flick from Billboard magazine wrote, "American-born rapper Tina Harris makes a poetic debut on a track that combines slick, time-sensitive beats ... It's a move that enriches and elevates the final product. Such musical warmth inspires a heartfelt performance from Harris, who oozes the charisma of a major star."

== Track listings ==
European CD single
No.	Title	Length
1.	"Everything's Gonna Be Alright" (video version 88 bpm)	3:04
2.	"Everything's Gonna Be Alright" (radio version 85 bpm)	3:10

European and Japanese maxi-CD single
No.	Title	Length
1.	"Everything's Gonna Be Alright" (radio version 85 bpm)	3:10
2.	"Everything's Gonna Be Alright" (video version 88 bpm)	3:04
3.	"Everything's Gonna Be Alright" (Geo's Big "E" club mix)	4:17
4.	"Everything's Gonna Be Alright" (classic version)	2:59
5.	"Suite No. 3 'Air'" (by the German Symphony Orchestra)	3:02
6.	"Everything's Gonna Be Alright" (instrumental)	2:59
7.	"Everything's Gonna Be Alright" (extended version)	3:53

UK CD single
No.	Title	Length
1.	"Everything's Gonna Be Alright" (radio edit)	3:10
2.	"Everything's Gonna Be Alright" (Most Wanted's G-String mix)	8:17
3.	"Everything's Gonna Be Alright" (Handbagger's Mild Cigar mix)	6:36

UK cassette single
No.	Title	Length
1.	"Everything's Gonna Be Alright" (radio edit)	3:10
2.	"Everything's Gonna Be Alright" (Most Wanted's G-String mix)	8:17

== Charts ==
=== Weekly charts ===
Weekly chart performance for "Everything's Gonna Be Alright"
Chart (1997–1998)	Peak position
Austria (Ö3 Austria Top 40)	5
Belgium (Ultratop 50 Flanders)	9
Belgium (Ultratop 50 Wallonia)	6
Europe (Eurochart Hot 100)	14
Finland (Suomen virallinen lista)	10
France (SNEP)	3
Germany (GfK)	12
Iceland (Íslenski Listinn Topp 40)	4
Ireland (IRMA)	4
Italy (Musica e dischi)	18
Italy Airplay (Music & Media)	10
Netherlands (Dutch Top 40)	11
Netherlands (Single Top 100)	16
Norway (VG-lista)	3
Scottish Singles Sales (Official Charts)	6
Spain (AFYVE)	2
Sweden (Sverigetopplistan)	5
Switzerland (Schweizer Hitparade)	10
UK Singles (Official Charts)	5
UK Hip Hop/R&B (Official Charts)	1
US Billboard Hot 100	46
US Rhythmic Top 40 (Billboard)	25

=== Year-end charts ===
Year-end chart performance for "Everything's Gonna Be Alright"
Chart (1998)	Position
Belgium (Ultratop 50 Flanders)	71
Belgium (Ultratop 50 Wallonia)	54
Europe (Eurochart Hot 100)	29
France (SNEP)	25
Iceland (Íslenski Listinn Topp 40)	79
Sweden (Hitlistan)	62
Switzerland (Schweizer Hitparade)	45
UK Singles (OCC)	63
US Rhythmic Top 40 (Billboard)	93

== Certifications ==
Certifications and sales for "Everything's Gonna Be Alright"
Region	Certification	Certified units/sales
France (SNEP)	Gold	250,000^{*}
Norway (IFPI Norway)	Gold	
Sweden (GLF)	Gold	15,000^{^}
United Kingdom (BPI)	Silver	200,000^{^}
^{*} Sales figures based on certification alone.^{^} Shipments figures based on certification alone.

== Release history ==
Release dates and formats for "Everything's Gonna Be Alright"
Region	Date	Format(s)	Label(s)	Ref.
Germany	3 October 1997	Maxi-CD	RCA; BMG	
Japan	4 March 1998	Maxi-CD	RCA; BMG	
United Kingdom	3 August 1998	CD; cassette	RCA; BMG	
United States	22 September 1998	12-inch vinyl	RCA	
