= Jade Villalon =

Jade Valerie
- Born: Jade Valerie Villalon; August 12, 1980 (age 46); San Diego, California, U.S.
- Genres: Pop; dance-pop; pop rock; classical pop; soul; R&B
- Occupations: Singer; songwriter; pianist
- Instruments: Vocals piano
- Years active: 1999–present
- Labels: Paramusic Corporation (1999–2006, with Sweetbox); Avex Trax (2009, with Eternity ∞); Sony Music Japan (2010, with Saint Vox)
- Formerly of: Sweetbox (1999–2006, 2020); Eternity ∞ (2009); Saint Vox (2010)
- Website: http://www.jadevalerie.com/

Jade Valerie Villalon (born August 12, 1980), also known by her project and stage name Jade Valerie, is an American pop singer, songwriter, and actress. From 1999 to 2007, she was the vocalist and lyricist of Sweetbox, releasing five original albums and a number of compilations. During this time, each major release achieved either a gold or platinum status in Japan and South Korea, also earning various awards and chart positions around the world.

Following Villalon's departure from this project, both Villalon and Sweetbox composer and producer Rosan Geoman worked together once again to release albums under Villalon's own name, Jade Valerie. After two album releases under this name, two additional side-projects were formed entitled Eternity ∞ and Saint Vox, both releasing a self-titled album. Saint Vox presented a collaboration effort between Villalon's vocal and lyrical work, Geoman's arrangements of both original and sampled classical pieces, and the stylings of Japanese violinist Emiri Miyamoto.

== Biography ==
Jade Valerie Villalon was born on August 12, 1980, and was raised in San Diego, California. She currently resides in Houston, Texas.

=== Acting ===
As a child, Villalon began her career by acting in television commercials and promotional material. Her first full-length acting role was at the age of seven for the Broadway musical Gypsy. Around this time, she was featured in a media advertisement with Michelle Williams. At the age of seventeen, she guest-starred as Melanie, a teenager in a camp for HIV-positive teenagers, in the television program Touched by an Angel (Episode 70: "The Pact"). After gaining recognition for her vocal performance in the episode, she appeared in various music videos for other artists, such as the video TLC's "Unpretty". Villalon also had a small appearance as an extra in the movie Sorority Boys.

=== Music ===
In Villalon's career as a vocalist, she has released ten original albums, has been presented with a number of international awards and sales certifications, has had her music featured in a number of commercials and television spots, and has lent her voice to record the vocal songs "Real Emotion" and "1000 Words" on the English version of the video game Final Fantasy X-2. Her albums in Sweetbox have all reached gold or platinum status in Korea, and many of her singles have ranked in the Top 10 on charts in Europe and Asia.

Villalon has also written songs for a number of artists, including The Cheetah Girls, Ayumi Hamasaki, and Ateed, and has had her works covered by artists such as S.H.E and Skye Sweetnam.

==== Gemstone ====
In her teens, Villalon began interning as a ghost-writer for Death Row Records, and founded the pop–rock project Gemstone along with Freaky Friday actress Christina Vidal and fellow artist Crystal Grant. Although no album was released for commercial sale, some of the tracks made during this period surfaced on albums and compilations by Villalon in her later music project, Sweetbox.

==== Sweetbox ====
After Gemstone parted ways, Villalon partnered as a singer and songwriter with producer and songwriter Roberto "Geo" Rosan, for the pop project Sweetbox, and became the project's first multiple-award-winning vocalist. With Sweetbox, many of the project's songs brought attention for being based on famous classical pieces, and others achieved international chart success. She released five original albums under the project, Classified, Jade, Adagio, After the Lights and Addicted, as well as multiple compilations and a live DVD.

Throughout Villalon's time leading the project, she toured in many regions of Asia, with her music and voice being featured in a number of radio charts, television spots, product commercials, movie soundtracks and video games. During this time, she was awarded as Asia's No. 1 cross-over artist, with each her releases achieving Gold or Platinum status in Korea. After this success, issues started with the original owners of the Sweetbox franchise, and Villalon left the project behind to start a new pop project under her own name, "Jade Valerie".

==== Jade Valerie ====
In 2007, Villalon and her long-time Sweetbox partner, "Geo", left Sweetbox behind to start work together on Villalon's new music project titled under her own name, "Jade Valerie". Later that year, Villalon released the album Out of the Box, the title being a play on words of the departure from Sweetbox, to critical acclaim.

Her 9th album, Bittersweet Symphony, reached No. 15 on the Oricon charts. She re-released Out of the Box in Korea, containing some of the tracks from her original album of the same name, along with tracks of Bittersweet Symphony. She also re-recorded the song "You Don't Know Me" with guest vocalist Kim Dong Wan, of the Korean group Shinhwa.

After her continued success, Villalon released an interpretation of the Christmas carol "O Holy Night", which became a social media sensation, and revealed that The Cheetah Girls had recorded the song "Human" on their TCG album, which had written for the Disney-produced vocalist team. Later, it was announced that Villalon and "Geo" had teamed up with Japanese violinist Emiri Miyamoto for a collaboration album entitled Saint Vox. In 2010, it was announced that Villalon and Geo had released a single once again under the "Jade Valerie" moniker, titled "Don't Tell Me I'm Wrong", featuring the vocals of K-pop vocalist Brian Joo, member of the group Fly to the Sky. Over a year after this release, it was published that Villalon had performed in a duet with The Gypsies, a track that would be released on the latter's upcoming album. In 2012, Villalon collaborated with actor Brandon Jones on the song "In The Moment".

==== Eternity ====
In 2009 Villalon and "Geo" confirmed they had started a new project entitled "Eternity ∞". The self-titled album Eternity ∞ was released on June 3, 2009. Each track sampled a famous classical piece, many using pieces previously used in Sweetbox, such as Canon in D major by Pachelbel, and Solveig's Song by Grieg. The album contained the singles "I Will", "Love" and "Wonderful World", the latter being featured in a number of Korean television spots. The release was supported by a showcasing event sponsored by Elle magazine.

In 2017, Villalon released a new song under the project name titled "Heartkick" for the compilation album Happy Merry Wedding.

==== Saint Vox ====
In 2010, Villalon stated that she was working on a project entitled Saint Vox, a collaboration between herself and the violinist Emiri Miyamoto. The self-titled album, Saint Vox, was released on November 25, 2010. The album included sampling of six famous Japanese and Korean compositions, and six songs featuring original compositions by long-time producer "Geo". The first single, "Don't Leave Me This Way", debuted on Emiri Miyamoto's radio show on October 11, 2010.

==== Career break ====
After a four-year absence since the release of the Saint Vox album, a message from Villalon was posted on her fansite, "Jade Valerie Nation," in January 2015, saying:

"First and foremost I've been focusing on family. I've been spending much needed and missed time with my loved ones. I also got married to someone wonderful and I had a gorgeous baby girl. I feel really lucky and grateful for this chapter in my life and I'm taking the time to enjoy it and learn from it.

Many artists take a few years to regroup between albums but I had never done that. I had been recording, writing, touring and promoting albums for 11 years straight!

I have really missed making albums for myself but after all the drama that ensued after Geo and I parted ways with our business manager (HS) I felt like I owed it to the fans who love and buy my albums to take some space and make something great for them.

I've had the privilege to spend the last years also doing a lot of writing for other recording artists and TV shows in Los Angeles and mainly in Nashville. It's been awesome to make music in other genre's that I love especially country.

I know some strange demo's got leaked and some snippets from small shows so it was confusing to figure out what I have been up to. People have asked me why I haven't put things on youtube or posted them, and the reason is normally you keep that kind of stuff confidential for the artists or projects that you are working with. I've also been performing and trying new stuff out ( I dare you to find it on youtube! hint country ) and basically just being an artist.

Geo and I have remained close friends, and obviously we have a long history. We have also been collaborating for some of his artists and others, as you are now hearing on Symphobia. We will still do music together in the future for me, for others, for anything because we both love making music.

So yes I am still here, still singing, still writing, and still listening and reading what you have to say! Don't worry I am not done yet! Thanks for all the years of support you given me. I don't ever take it for granted, and there isn't a day that goes by that I don't think of the fans who brought me to where I am today."

==== Return to Sweetbox ====
In 2020, "Geo" and Villalon reunited to secure the rights to release once again as Sweetbox, and were joined by co-vocalist Saint Viv. As a team, they released a new album, Da Capo, and a new compilation, Happy Wedding Complete Best.

== Discography ==
Albums

Sweetbox (Sweetbox discography)

- Classified (2001)
- Jade (2002)
- Adagio (2004)
- After the Lights (2004)
- Addicted (2006)
- Da Capo (2020)

Jade Valerie

- Out of the Box (2007)
- Bittersweet Symphony (2008)

Eternity ∞

- Eternity ∞ (2009)

Saint Vox

- Saint Vox (2010)
