= S.H.E discography =

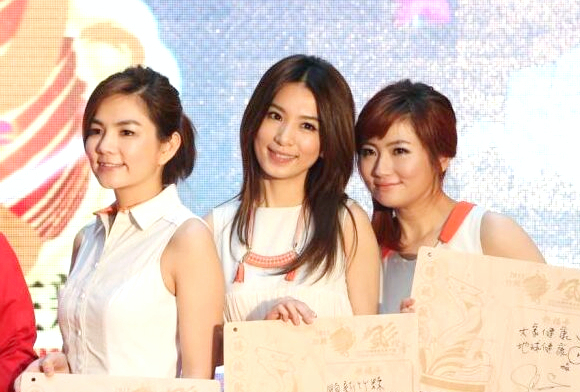
- S.H.E in 2013
- Studio albums: 11
- Extended plays: 1
- Soundtrack albums: 7
- Live albums: 5
- Compilation albums: 2
- Digital albums: 1
- Collaborations: 6
- Side projects: 4

The discography of Taiwanese girl group S.H.E consists of eleven studio albums, three live albums, two compilation albums, seven soundtrack albums and one internet album. The trio, consisting of members Selina Jen, Hebe Tien, and Ella Chen, made their debut in 2001 under HIM International Music. All of S.H.E's album covers display an oxalis as a symbol for the group. On some covers, the clover is easy to spot (Girls Dorm, Together, Encore, Forever) while its appearance is more subtle on others (Super Star, Once Upon a Time). Album releases are followed with the release of a karaoke VCD, consisting of the group's music videos for that particular album.

Although S.H.E does not write the majority of their songs, they composed "Sweet Honey" (甜蜜). The rights to the song were sold on October 21, 2005, for NT$200,000. In 2007, S.H.E produced the song "Wifey" (老婆) for Play.

== Albums ==
=== Studio albums ===
| Title | Album details | Peak chart positions | | | Sales |
| Title | Album details | TWN | MLY | SGP | Sales |
|---|---|---|---|---|---|
| Girls' Dorm (女生宿舍) | Released: September 11, 2001; Label: HIM International Music; Format: CD, cassette | — | — | — | Asia: 750,000; TWN: 150,000 |
| Youth Society (青春株式會社) | Released: January 29, 2002; Label: HIM International Music; Format: CD, cassette | — | — | 5 | Asia: 1,600,000; TWN: 250,000 |
| Genesis (美麗新世界) | Released: August 5, 2002; Label: HIM International Music; Format: CD, cassette | — | — | 4 | TWN: 280,000 |
| Super Star | Released: August 22, 2003; Label: HIM International Music; Format: CD, cassette | — | 2 | — | Asia: 2,680,000; TWN: 300,000 |
| Magical Journey (奇幻旅程) | Released: February 6, 2004; Label: HIM International Music; Format: CD, cassette | — | 2 | 3 | Asia: 2,000,000 |
| Encore (安可) | Released: November 12, 2004; Label: HIM International Music; Format: CD, cassette | — | 1 | 1 | Asia: 2,400,000 |
| Once Upon a Time (不想長大) | Released: November 25, 2005; Label: HIM International Music; Format: CD, cassette | 1 | — | — | Asia: 2,500,000 |
| Play | Released: May 11, 2007; Label: HIM International Music; Format: CD, digital download | 1 | — | — | Asia: 2,200,000; TWN: 150,000 |
| FM S.H.E (我的電台) | Released: September 23, 2008; Label: HIM International Music; Format: CD, digital download | 1 | — | — | |
| Shero | Released: March 26, 2010; Label: HIM International Music; Format: CD, digital download | 1 | — | — | TWN: 68,000 |
| Blossomy (花又開好了) | Released: November 16, 2012; Label: HIM International Music; Format: CD, digital download | 1 | — | — | |

=== Digital albums ===
| Title | Album details |
|---|---|
| Map of Love (愛的地圖) | Released: June 22, 2009; Label: HIM International Music; Format: Digital download |

=== Live albums ===
| Title | Album details |
|---|---|
| Fantasy Land Tour 2004 in Taipei (奇幻樂園台北演唱會) | Released: January 14, 2005; Label: HIM International Music; Format: CD, DVD |
| Moving Castle Concert Live @ H.K. (移動城堡香港演唱會) | Released: December 22, 2006; Label: HIM International Music; Format: CD, DVD |
| S.H.E Is the One Tour Live (S.H.E 愛而為一演唱會影音館) | Released: March 14, 2011; Label: HIM International Music; Format: DVD, BD, Digital Download |
| 2gether 4ever (2gether 4ever 演唱會影音館) | Released: August 8, 2014; Label: HIM International Music; Format: DVD, BD, Digital Download |
| 2gether 4ever Encore (2gether 4ever Encore 演唱會影音館) | Released: July 10, 2015; Label: HIM International Music; Format: DVD, BD, Digital Download |

=== Compilation albums ===
| Title | Album details | Peak chart positions | | Sales |
| Title | Album details | TWN | SGP | Sales |
|---|---|---|---|---|
| Together | Released: January 23, 2003; Label: HIM International Music; Format: CD, DVD | — | 3 | TWN: 280,000 |
| Forever (New Song + Collection) | Released: July 21, 2006; Label: HIM International Music; Format: CD, DVD | 1 | — | TWN: 69,000 |

== Extended plays ==
| Title | Album details |
|---|---|
| Irreplaceable (永遠都在) | Released: August 26, 2016; Label: HIM International Music; Format: CD, digital download |

== Singles ==
| Title | Year | Notes |
|---|---|---|
| "Seventeen" | 2018 | 17th anniversary commemoration single |

== Soundtracks ==
| Title | Year | Album |
|---|---|---|
| "Flowers Have Blossomed" | 2003 | The Rose OST |
| "Star Light" (星光) | 2005 | Reaching for the Stars OST |
| "A Vision of Eternity" (一眼萬年) | 2006 | The Little Fairy OST |
| "What to Do?" (怎麼辦) | 2006 | Hanazakarino Kimitachihe OST |
| "How Have You Been Lately?" (最近還好嗎) | 2007 | Bull Fighting OST |
| "Love Has Come" (愛來過) | 2007 | Bull Fighting OST |
| "Loving You" (愛上你) | 2010 | Down with Love OST |
| "Wings of My Words" | 2015 | The Ark Of Mr.Chow OST |

== Collaborations ==
| Title | Year | Album |
|---|---|---|
| "Solo Madrigal" (Selina with Tank) | 2006 | Fighting |
| "Only Have Feelings for You" (Hebe with Fahrenheit) | 2006 | Fahrenheit |
| "You Are the Song in My Heart" (Selina with Leehom Wang) | 2007 | Change Me |
| "New Home" (with Fahrenheit) | 2008 | Two-Sided Fahrenheit |
| "Lao Chang Pan" (with various artists) | 2010 | Lian Hua |

== Other songs ==
- "Let Yourself Shine" (讓自己亮起來) – jingle for 3+2 cracker commercials.
- "Always Open" – for 7-Eleven's 2007 promotional campaign.
- "7 Kids" (7仔) – for Stephen Chow's movie CJ7. Although it is S.H.E's only Cantonese song, "7 Kids" was later re-sung in Mandarin.
- "Red Throughout The World" (紅遍全球) – Coca-Cola's theme song for the 2008 Beijing Olympics. The initial version also featured Will Pan and Jacky Cheung, but an S.H.E-only version was later released.
- "S.H.E's Pop Radio 91.7 台歌" – jingle for FM 91.7.
- "Dream Field" (夢田 Meng Tian) – S.H.E's 2009 bonus single album on "The 3 Spas of Love (爱的3温暖)".

== Footnotes ==
- ^{a} ^{b} ^{c} Featuring Selina in a solo or collaboration
- ^{a} ^{b} ^{c} ^{d} Featuring Hebe in a solo or collaboration
- ^{a} ^{b} Featuring Ella in a solo or collaboration
