= Selina Jen discography =

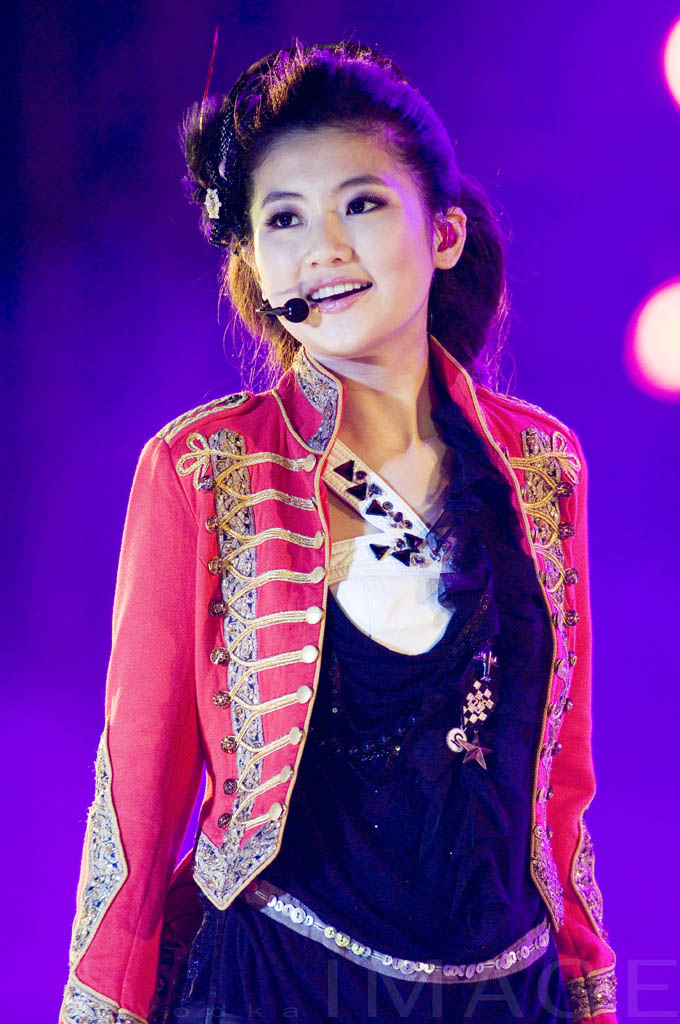
- Studio albums: 1
- EPs: 2
- Music videos: 16

Taiwanese singer Selina Jen (Chinese: 任家萱) has released one studio album and one Extended play. She is a member of the Taiwanese girl-group S.H.E, and released her debut solo album, 3.1415, in 2015.

== Albums ==
=== Studio albums ===
Title	Released	Label	Sales
3.1415	January 9, 2015	HIM	

=== Extended plays ===
Title	Released	Label	Sales
Dream a New Dream	December 16, 2011	HIM	30,000 (Taiwan)
My Own Beauty	April 29, 2022	The Beauty of Ren Limited	

== Singles ==
Title	Released	Note
"Xin Ru Zhi Shui"(心如止水)	December 6, 2019	Cover
"All year round"(四季)	October, 2020	

== Collaborations ==
Title	Released	From
"Are you all right" feat. Ella Chen	September 11, 2001	Girls' Dorm
"Solo Madrigal" feat. Tank	February 24, 2006	Fighting
"You Are a Song in My Heart" feat. Wang Leehom	July 13, 2007	Change Me
"Love you for who you are" (Taiwanese Hokkien Song) feat. Ricky Hsiao	January 9, 2015	3.1415

== Soundtracks ==
Title	Year	From
"Forget to Forget about You"	2001	Girls' Dorm
"Can't Worry"	2005	Reaching for the Stars Original Soundtrack
"The Blossom of Youth"	2014	Twatutia (大稻埕)(Taiwanese movie)
"Lost and Found"	2014	Say I Love You
"Almost Heaven"	2016	A Touch of Green
"Forget to Forget about You (2016)"	2016	Irreplaceable
"She is Beautiful"	2018	She Is Beautiful (Chinese TV drama)
"Dare to Love"	2018	The Evolution Of Our Love (Chinese TV drama)
"Take Shelter From The Rain"	2019	Bad Boy Symphony (樂獄)(Taiwanese movie)
