= I Love Trouble =

I Love Trouble may refer to:

- I Love Trouble (1948 film), a film noir starring Franchot Tone
- I Love Trouble (1994 film), a romantic comedy featuring Julia Roberts and Nick Nolte
- "I Love Trouble", a track from the album FM S.H.E by Taiwanese girl group S.H.E
