= Perfect 3 World Tour =

2006–2009 concert tour by S.H.E

- Tour by S.H.E
- Perfect 3 World Tour Special in Macau
- Location: Asia
- Start date: July 8, 2006
- End date: June 20, 2009
- No. of shows: 12

S.H.E concert chronology
- Fantasy Land World Tour (2004–2006); Perfect 3 World Tour (2006–2009); S.H.E is the One World Tour (2009–2010)

Perfect 3 World Tour (Chinese: 移動城堡世界巡迴演唱會) is the second world tour by Taiwanese girl group S.H.E. It began at the Shanghai Stadium on July 8, 2006, and concluded at the Cotai Arena in Macao on June 20, 2009. A live album of the tour recorded in Hong Kong was released on December 22, 2006.

== Background ==
The tour started in the Shanghai Stadium, China on July 8, 2006, and the tour ended in Stadium Merdeka, Malaysia on December 1, 2007, as the final performance, and the tour had a total of 11 performances. And then one and a half years later, the tour added another special stop in Macau on June 20, 2009, so the tour had a total of 12 performances. The concerts from July to December 2006 attracted a total of approximately 190,000 people and grossed around NT$200 million.

== Tour dates ==
Date	City	Country	Venue	Attendance
July 8, 2006	Shanghai	China	Shanghai Stadium	50,000
July 13, 2006	Hong Kong		Hong Kong Coliseum	—
October 14, 2006	Shenyang	China	Wulihe Stadium	—
October 21, 2006	Wuhan	China	Wuhan Stadium	—
November 11, 2006	Shenzhen	China	Shenzhen Stadium	30,000
December 16, 2006	Taipei	Taiwan	Taipei Arena	—
January 27, 2007	Singapore		Singapore Indoor Stadium	8,000
September 1, 2007	Beijing	China	Olympic Sports Centre	—
October 13, 2007	Changsha	China	Helong Sports Center Stadium	—
November 10, 2007	Zhuhai	China	Zhuhai Stadium	—
December 1, 2007	Kuala Lumpur	Malaysia	Stadium Merdeka	—
June 20, 2009	Macau		Cotai Arena	—
Total				364,000

== Live albums ==
Moving Castle Concert Live @ H.K.

Live album by S.H.E
- Released: December 22, 2006
- Recorded: July 13, 2006
- Venue: Hong Kong Coliseum
- Label: HIM International Music

S.H.E's live album chronology
Fantasy Land Tour 2004 in Taipei (2005)	Moving Castle Live @ H.K. (2006)	S.H.E Is the One (2011)

Moving Castle Concert Live @ H.K. (Chinese: 移動城堡香港演唱會; pinyin: Yídòng Chéngbǎo Xiānggǎng Yǎnchàng Huì) is S.H.E's second live album, released on December 22, 2006. The songs are recordings from their concert at the Hong Kong Coliseum during their Perfect 3 World Tour. The album contains a bonus DVD that chronicles S.H.E's five years in the entertainment industry. The DVD version of the Hong Kong concert was released later on January 22, 2007.

During the concert, each member provided her own performance and sang solos of her favourite songs. The album has five fewer talking segments than Fantasy Land Tour 2004 in Taipei.

=== Track listing ===
CD 1

1. Intro + "Not Yet Lovers" (Intro+戀人未滿)
2. "Don't Wanna Grow Up" (不想長大)
3. "Remember"
4. "Star Light" (星光)
5. Ella's Drum March (Ella的娃娃兵進行曲)
6. "Where's Love" (愛呢)
7. "Grizzling Sky" (天灰)
8. "Not To Be Your Friend" (不作你的朋友)
9. Selina Solo Dancing Show
10. "Just Fit" (對號入座)
11. "Super Model"
12. Talking I
13. "Belief"
14. "Flowers Have Blossomed" (花都開好了)
15. Tank – "Love Among Three Nations" (三國戀)
16. Selina & Tank – "Solo Madrigal" (獨唱情歌)
17. "Ambush From Sides to Sides" (十面埋伏)
18. "Piquancy" (痛快)

CD 2

1. Talking II
2. Selina – "Still Lonely" (還是會寂寞) Originally sung by Chen Chi Chen.
3. Hebe – "She's The One" Originally sung by Robbie Williams.
4. Ella – "Cloudy Day" (陰天) Originally sung by Karen Mok.
5. "Lovers" (情人) Originally sung by Beyond; S.H.E sang the song in Cantonese.
6. Talking III
7. "White Love Song" (白色戀歌)
8. "Don't Say Sorry" (別說對不起)
9. Ella – "Love is Simple" (愛很簡單) Originally sung by David Tao.
10. "Migratory Bird" (候鳥)
11. "Persian Cat" (波斯貓)
12. "Ring Ring Ring"
13. "Genesis" (美麗新世界)
14. Talking IV
15. "Fascination" (Fan Version) (魔力-歌迷版)
16. "Faraway" (遠方)
17. "I Love You" (我愛你)
18. Hebe Drum Solo
19. "Super Star"
20. Ending
