= The 3rd Round =

- The 3rd Round cover

Studio album 第三回合 by Tank
- Released: 9 May 2009
- Genre: Mandopop
- Language: Mandarin
- Label: HIM International Music

Tank chronology
Keep Fighting (2007)	The 3rd Round (2009)

The 3rd Round (Chinese: 第三回合) is Taiwanese Mandopop artist Tank's third Mandarin studio album. It was released on 29 May 2009 by HIM International Music. A second edition The 3rd Round (Deluxe Edition) (第三回合 精裝版) was released on 29 May 2009 with a bonus DVD with two music videos and behind-the-scene footage.

The album features an insert song, "全世界都停電" (Power Out All Over The World) of 2009 Taiwanese drama ToGetHer, starring Jiro Wang of Fahrenheit, Rainie Yang and George Hu. The DVD features the music video of opening theme song, "鬥牛要不要" (Do You Want a Bull-Fight) of 2007 Taiwanese drama Bull Fighting, starring Mike He, Hebe Tien, and Lee Wei.

The track "全世界都停電" (Power Out All Over The World) is listed at number 65 on Hit Fm Taiwan's Hit Fm Annual Top 100 Singles Chart (Hit-Fm年度百首單曲) for 2009.

== Track listing ==
1. "繃帶俱樂部" (Bandage Club)
2. "生還者" (Survivor)
3. "全世界都停電" (Power Out All Over The World) - insert song of ToGetHer
4. "阿門" (Amen)
5. "真心話太冒險" (The Truth Is Too Risky)
6. "如果我變成回憶" (If I Become A Memory)
7. "會長大的幸福" (Growing Happiness)
8. "陽光美眉" (Sunshine Beauty)
9. "再做一個夢" (Dream Again)
10. "是誰" (Who)

== Bonus DVD ==
1. Tank The 3rd Round photo shot
2. "生還者" (Survivor) MV behind-the-scene footage
3. "生還者" (Survivor) MV
4. "鬥牛要不要" Dou Niu Yao Bu Yao (Do You Want a Bull-Fight) MV - opening theme of Bull Fighting
