= FM S.H.E =

- Future Radio Edition cover

Studio album by S.H.E
- Released: September 23, 2008
- Recorded: 2008
- Genre: Pop; R&B
- Length: 52:48
- Language: Mandarin
- Label: HIM International Music
- Producer: S.H.E, David Tao

S.H.E chronology
Play (2007)	FM S.H.E (2008)	Map of Love (2009)

Singles from FM S.H.E
- 1. "Miss Universe" Released: September 9, 2008; 2. "It's Quiet Now" Released: September 23, 2008; 3. "Coastal Highway Exit" Released: September 23, 2008

FM S.H.E (Chinese: 我的電台; pinyin: Wǒ de diàntái; lit. 'My station') is the ninth studio album by Taiwanese girl group S.H.E. It was released on September 23, 2008, by HIM International Music in two editions: a Retro Radio Edition and Future Radio Edition, which contains a bonus DVD with two music videos and behind-the-scene footage.

The members of the group take on the persona of radio hosts, which is interspersed with three radio station-esque snippets. The track "It's Quiet Now", with lyrics rewritten by Selina, is a cover of "Silence" (2001) by fellow Taiwanese recording artist Jay Chou, which was released in his second album Fantasy. From December 2007 to September 2008, the music video for "Miss Universe" was the year's fifth most popular music video, having been requested over 32 million times.

== Reception ==
The album debuted at number one on Taiwan's G-Music Top 20 Weekly Mandarin and Combo Charts, and Five Music Chart at week 38 (September 19 to 25, 2008) with a percentage sales of 35.81%, 17.9% and 25.18% respectively. The tracks "It's Quiet Now", "Miss Universe" and "Coastal Highway Exit" were listed at number 14, 68 and 84 respectively on Hit Fm Taiwan's Hit Fm Annual Top 100 Singles Chart for 2008.

== Accolades ==
The album was awarded one of the Top 10 Selling Mandarin Albums of the Year at the 2008 IFPI Hong Kong Album Sales Awards, presented by the Hong Kong branch of IFPI. The track, It's Quiet Now" won one of the Top 10 Songs of the Year at the 2009 HITO Radio Music Awards presented by Taiwanese radio station Hit FM.

== Music videos ==
The "Coastal Highway Exit" MV co-stars Ella and Eddie Peng and directed by Chu Yu-ning. It is about a girl whose boyfriend died due to a sea accident. The girl fell in love with another boy with similar traits as her ex, only to find out that he only treats her as a friend and he already have a girlfriend. "It's Quiet Now" co-stars Selina and Ethan Juan, who plays a couple breaking up.

== Track listing ==
No.	Title	Lyrics	Music	Notes	Length
1.	"Good Morning" (早安您好; Zao An Nin Hao)	Shi Rencheng, Xu Ling	Ella, Wang Zhi Ping	Talk piece	1:46
2.	"I Love Trouble" (我愛煩惱; Wo Ai Fan Nao)	Albert Leung	Fefe Dobson, Billy Steinberg, Josh Alexander (Note: a cover of "This Is My Life" (2006) by Fefe Dobson)		3:27
3.	"Miss Universe" (宇宙小姐; Yu Zhou Xiao Jie)	Lan Xiaoxie	Robert Rosan, Jade Villalon		3:03
4.	"Coastal Highway Exit" (沿海公路的出口; Yan Hai Gong Lu De Chu Kou)	Huang Jianzhou	Zheng Nan		4:21
5.	"Dawn of the Genuine" (天亮了; Tian Liang Le)	Shi Rencheng	Robert Rosan, Jade Villalon		3:27
6.	"Meaner Than You" (比你賤; Bi Ni Jian)	Zheng Nan, Shi Rencheng	Zheng Nan	featuring Judy Chou (周定緯)	3:11
7.	"Mrs. Hebe's Time" (喜碧夫人時間; Xi Bi Fu Ren Shi Jian)			Talk piece	2:59
8.	"Girls' Be Strong" (女孩當自強; Nu Hai Dang Zi Qiang)	Lan Xiaoxie	Zheng Nan		4:49
9.	"It's Quiet Now" (安静了; An Jing Le)	Selina Ren, Elisha Lee	Jay Chou, Lu Shaochun		4:31
10.	"I'm a Martian" (我是火星人; Wo Shi Huo Xing Ren)	Lan Xiaoxie	Zheng Nan, Venk		3:29
11.	"Planet 612" (612星球; 612 Xing Qiu)	Jennifer Hsu	Zheng Nan		5:01
12.	"Waiter" (店小二; Dian Xiao Er)	Huang Jianzhou	Evan Yo		4:13
13.	"Overnight DJ" (熬夜DJ; Ao Ye DJ)			Talk piece	1:01
14.	"Moonlight Letters" (月光手札; Yue Guang Shou Zha)	Alang Huang			4:16
15.	"Sweet and Sour" (酸甜; Suan Tian)	Chen Hsin Yen	Li Tien Lung	featuring Fahrenheit	3:13

=== Bonus DVD ===
FM S.H.E (Future Radio Edition)

1. Cover photoshoot behind-the-scene
2. "宇宙小姐" (Miss Universe) MV behind-the-scene
3. "宇宙小姐" (Miss Universe) MV
4. "酸甜" (Sweet and Sour) MV behind-the-scene
5. "酸甜" (Sweet and Sour) MV

== Charts ==
=== Weekly charts ===
Chart (2008)	Peak position
Taiwanese Albums (G-Music)	1

=== Year-end charts ===
Chart (2008)	Position
Taiwanese Albums (Note: Best-selling albums of the year in Taiwan as reported by media outlets)	3
