= Heart Like Still Water =

2019 single by Selina Jen

- Heart Like Still Water digital cover

Single by Selina Jen
- Released: 6 December 2019
- Recorded: 2019
- Genre: Mandopop
- Length: 4:02
- Label: The Beauty of Ren Limited; Lejian Weilai Culture Creative
- Songwriter: Ice Paper

Music video
- "Heart Like Still Water" on YouTube

"Heart Like Still Water" (Chinese: 心如止水) is a digital single by Taiwanese singer Selina Jen, released on December 6, 2019, as her comeback lead single. The track is a cover version of the song originally performed by Ice Paper.

== Background ==
In 2018, Jen began experiencing vocal issues that remained unresolved. She stated that examinations by an otolaryngologist revealed no physical abnormalities with her vocal cords. To address the condition, she sought assistance through vocal coaching and psychological counseling; however, the exact cause remained unidentified, with Jen noting that her vocal resonance and placement appeared to have shifted. Expressing that the act of singing had become a source of psychological stress, she announced that all of her music-related activities, including the planned release of her second solo studio album, would be placed on an indefinite hiatus until her voice was fully restored.

On December 6, 2019, Jen released a cover of the viral hit "Heart Like Still Water" (心如止水). The track garnered significant attention from fans, as it not only marked her return to singing following her vocal issues in 2018, but also served as her first solo musical release since establishing her own management company, The Beauty of Ren Limited. Addressing her health, Jen's manager reassured the public that her vocal cords were physically healthy, attributing her previous inability to sing to psychological stress. The manager also noted that her vocal delivery on the new single differed from her signature sweet and warm style.

== Commercial performance ==
On its third day of release, "Heart Like Still Water" reached number 44 on the KKBOX Taiwan Mandarin Daily Singles Chart, eventually peaking at number 21 on December 11. Additionally, on the day of its release, the track entered the KKBOX Taiwan Mandarin Daily New Singles Chart at number 22, eventually peaking at number 6 on December 13.

Additionally, on the Taiwan KKBOX Mandarin Weekly Singles Chart, it debuted at number 35 in its first week and peaked at number 27 in its third week. Meanwhile, on the KKBOX Mandarin New Singles Weekly Chart, it reached a peak of number 8 in its first week.

== Chart performance ==
=== Daily charts ===
Chart	Peak position
KKBOX Mandarin Daily Singles Chart	21
KKBOX Mandarin Daily New Singles Chart	6

=== Weekly charts ===
Chart	Peak position
KKBOX Mandarin New Singles Weekly Chart	8
KKBOX Mandarin Weekly Singles Chart	27
