= Keep Fighting =

- Keep Fighting cover

Studio album 延長比賽 by Tank
- Released: 19 January 2007
- Genre: Mandopop
- Language: Mandarin
- Label: HIM International Music

Tank chronology
Fighting (2006)	Keep Fighting (2007)	The 3rd Round (2009)

Keep Fighting (Chinese: 延長比賽) is Taiwanese Mandopop artist Tank's second Mandarin studio album. It was released on 19 January 2007 by HIM International Music with a bonus DVD containing highlight footage of Tank - Give Me Your Love Concert (Tank 給我你的愛萬人演唱會). A second edition Keep Fighting Collectable Edition (延長比賽 慶功珍藏) was released on 13 February 2007 with a bonus DVD containing six music videos and behind-the-scene footage.

The album features the ending theme song, "專屬天使" (Personal Angel) and insert song "懂了" (Understood) of Taiwanese drama Hanazakarino Kimitachihe, starring Wu Chun and Jiro Wang of Fahrenheit and Ella Chen of S.H.E. As well as insert song "從今以後" (From Now On) of Taiwanese drama KO One, starring Aaron Yan, Calvin Chen, and Jiro Wang of Taiwanese boy band, Fahrenheit and Danson Tang.

The track "非你莫屬" (It Had to be You), the ending theme of Tokyo Juliet and sung by Ariel Lin, was composed by Tank.

The track "街頭霸王" (Street Bully) was nominated for Top 10 Gold Songs at the Hong Kong TVB8 Awards, presented by television station TVB8, in 2007.

== Track listing ==
1. "反恐小組" Fan Kong Xiao Zu
2. "街頭霸王" (Street Bully)
3. "延長比賽" (Keep Fighting)
4. "非你莫屬" (It Had to be You) - ending theme of Tokyo Juliet
5. "嵐" (Wind)
6. "第二次初戀" (Second First Love)
7. "晴天雨" (Clear Sky Rain)
8. "專屬天使" (Personal Angel) - ending theme of Hanazakarino Kimitachihe
9. "城里的月光" (City's Moonlight)
10. "最後的微笑" (Last Smile)
11. "Dear Tank"
12. "懂了" (Understood) - insert song of Hanazakarino Kimitachihe
13. "從今以後" (From Now On) - insert song of KO One

== Bonus DVD ==
1. "街頭霸王" (Street Bully) MV behind-the-scene
2. "街頭霸王" (Street Bully) movie version MV
3. "專屬天使" (Personal Angel) MV behind-the-scene
4. "專屬天使" (Personal Angel) MV
5. "非你莫屬" (It Had to be You) movie version MV
6. "延長比賽" (Keep Flighting) MV
7. "獨唱情歌" Dú Chàng Qíng Gē (Solo Madrigal) MV - from Fighting
8. "蟑螂小強" Zhāng Láng Xiǎo Qiáng (Little Qiang the Cockroach) MV - from Fighting
