= My Own Beauty =

- My Own Beauty digital cover

EP by Selina Jen
- Released: 17 December 2021 (digital); 29 April 2022 (CD)
- Genre: Mandopop
- Length: 31:21
- Language: Mandarin
- Label: The Beauty of Ren Limited
- Producer: Selina Jen

Selina Jen chronology
3.1415 (2015)	My Own Beauty (2021)

Singles from My Own Beauty
- 1. "Talking To The Moon (心如止水)" Released: December 6, 2019; 2. "All Year Round (四季)" Released: October 11, 2020; 3. "My Own Beauty (往美的路我要自己作主)" Released: December 17, 2021; 4. "In The Dark (黑夜中相擁)" Released: March 18, 2022

My Own Beauty (Chinese: 往美的路我要自己作主) is the second solo EP by Taiwanese singer Selina Jen. It was available for pre-order on April 8, 2022, and officially released on April 29, 2022.

The title track "My Own Beauty" marks Selina's first attempt at writing and composing a song herself. The physical release is available in two versions: a limited edition featuring gold-stamped, sequentially numbered copies from 0001 to 1031 (representing Selina Jen's birthday, October 31), and a standard edition without numbering.

It topped the Books.com.tw weekly chart in Week 16. In the 2022 annual album sales rankings, the EP ranked 9th on G-Music (佳佳唱片) and 15th on Books.com.tw (博客來).

== Background ==
My Own Beauty (Chinese: 往美的路我要自己作主) is the debut studio album released by Selina Jen under her personal brand, "The Beauty of Ren". The album showcases Jen's growth as a singer-songwriter, featuring several tracks for which she contributed to the lyrics and composition. The album compiles the three tracks from her digital EP released in late 2021: "My Own Beauty", "Joyful Loneliness", and "We Are All The Same". It also includes "In The Dark", the official theme song for the 2022 horror film "The Funeral", in which Jen made her debut as a lead actress. Additionally, the album features previously unreleased preludes and instrumental versions, alongside her notable solo singles released since embarking on her solo career, such as "Talking To The Moon" and "All year round".

== Track listing ==
No.	Title	Lyrics	Music	Arrangement	Length
1.	"My Own Beauty" (往美的路我要自己作主)	Selina Jen, Yuen Chen	Selina Jen	Ludwig Lim	4:23
2.	"Joyful Loneliness" (居里夫人)	Kris Wong	Kevin Liao, Steven Lai	Steven Lai	4:02
3.	"We Are All The Same" (你我他)	Selina Jen, Yuen Chen	Selina Jen, Jodie Chen, Ludwig Lim	Ludwig Lim	4:08
4.	"All Year Round" (四季)	Ice Paper	Ice Paper	Shocka, Richard Au	3:35
5.	"Talking To The Moon" (心如止水)	Ice Paper	Ice Paper	Richard Au	3:59
6.	"In The Dark (Intro)" (黑夜中相擁–序曲)		Ice Paper	Jack Liu	1:16
7.	"In The Dark" (黑夜中相擁)	Xing Zheng	Ice Paper	Jack Liu	4:59
8.	"In The Dark (Instrumental)" (黑夜中相擁–演奏版)		Ice Paper	Jack Liu	4:59
Total length:					31:21

== Music videos ==
Title	Director	Release date	Link
"All Year Round" (四季)	Birdy Nio (邱柏昶)	October 15, 2020	MV
"My Own Beauty" (往美的路我要自己作主)	Yao Kuo-Chen (姚國禎)	December 17, 2021	MV
"Joyful Loneliness" (居里夫人)	Chang Ching-Yu (張瀞予)	December 30, 2021	MV
"In The Dark" (黑夜中相擁)	Dan-Quei Shen (沈丹桂)	July 14, 2022	MV
"We Are All The Same" (你我他)	Yi Yu Tsai (蔡宜豫), 晚起 (Wanchiko)	September 9, 2022	MV
