= Fighting (Tank album) =

Fighting!
- Fighting! cover

Studio album 生存之道 by Tank
- Released: 24 February 2006
- Genre: Rock, Mandopop
- Language: Mandarin
- Label: HIM International Music

Tank chronology
Fighting! (2006)	Keep Fighting (2007)

Fighting! (Chinese: 生存之道) is Taiwanese Mandopop artist Tank's debut Mandarin solo studio album. It was released on 24 February 2006 by HIM International Music with a bonus VCD containing two music videos. A second edition Fighting! Celebration Edition (生存之道 冠軍慶功加值版) was released on 31 March 2006 with three addition kala tracks and a bonus VCD containing six music videos.

The album features the opening theme song, "終極一班" (Extreme Class) and ending theme song, "給我你的愛" (Give Me Your Love) of Taiwanese drama KO One, starring Aaron Yan, Calvin Chen, and Jiro Wang of Taiwanese boy band, Fahrenheit and Danson Tang. The music video of "我們小時候" (When We Were Young) features Taiwanese singer Amber Kuo.

The track "給我你的愛" (Give Me Your Love) was nominated for Top 10 Gold Songs at the Hong Kong TVB8 Awards, presented by television station TVB8, in 2006.

== Track listing ==
1. "曙光" Shǔ Guāng (Dawn's Light)
2. "狙擊手" Jū Jī Shǒu (Sniper)
3. "三國戀" Sān Guó Liàn (The Love of Three Kingdoms)
4. "給我你的愛" Gěi Wǒ Nǐ De Ái (Give Me Your Love) - ending theme of KO One
5. "我們小時候" Wǒ Men Xiǎo Shí Hòu (When We Were Young)
6. "挺你到底" Tǐng Nǐ Dào Dǐ (Wait for You Until the End)
7. "蟑螂小強" Zhāng Láng Xiǎo Qiáng (Little Qiang the Cockroach)
8. "獨唱情歌" Dú Chàng Qíng Gē (Solo Madrigal) - feat Selina of S.H.E
9. "幾分之幾" Jǐ Fēn Zhī Jǐ (How Many Out Of How Many)
10. "潔西卡" Jié Xī Kǎ (Jessica)
11. "曙光版" Shǔ Guāng Bǎn (Dawn's Light - a cappella version)
12. "激戰" Jī Zhàn (Intense Battle)
13. "千年淚" Qiān Nián Lèi (Thousand Years of Tears)
14. "終極一班" Zhōng Jí Yī Bān (Extreme Class) - opening theme of KO One

== Music videos ==
- "給我你的愛" (Give Me Your Love) MV
- "挺你到底" (Wait for You Until the End) MV
- "三國戀" (The Love of Three Kingdoms) MV
- "獨唱情歌" (Solo Madrigal) - feat Selina
- "我們小時候" (When We Were Young) MV - feat Amber Kuo
- "激戰" (Intense Battle) MV
- "千年淚" (Thousand Years of Tears) MV
