= 3.1415 (album) =

- Album Cover

Studio album by Selina Jen
- Released: 9 January 2015
- Genre: Mandopop
- Length: 0:43:49
- Language: Mandarin
- Label: HIM International Music
- Producer: S.H.E, Bing Wang, JJ Lin

Selina Jen chronology
Dream a New Dream (2011)	3.1415 (2015)	My Own Beauty (2022)

3.1415 is the debut studio album from Taiwanese Mandopop artist Selina Jen of girl group S.H.E. It was released on 9 January 2015 by HIM International Music.

The tracks "3.1415...", "Watch Me Now" (看我的) and "Love You For Who You Are" (一人水一項) are listed at number 23, 54 and 72 respectively on Hit FM's Annual Top 100 Singles Chart for 2015.

== Track listing ==
No.	Title	Lyrics	Music	Arrangement	Length
1.	"Watch Me Now" (看我的)	Albert Leung	Im Sang Hyuck, Son Young Jin	Im Sang Hyuck, Son Young Jin	3:14
2.	"3.1415..."	Chang Chia Wei	Cui Di	Li Zhi-yi	3:32
3.	"Love You For Who You Are (feat. Ricky Hsiao 蕭煌奇)" (一人水一項)	Wu Xiong	Ricky Hsiao	Jason Huang	4:35
4.	"Multiple Choice" (自選曲)	Percy Phang@Pocket Music	Percy Phang@Pocket Music	Baby Chung	4:57
5.	"The Beauty of Ordinary Things" (平凡得可以)	Xu Min Ling	Tina Wang	Jason Huang	3:44
6.	"Big Girl"	Isaac Chen	Kwon, Ki Myoung	Liao Wei-jie	3:24
7.	"Dance, Dance, Dance" (舞舞舞)	Derek Shih	Tebey Ottoh, Edward Jonathan Harris, Robbie Smith, Simon Pettigrew	Pan Xin-wei	4:24
8.	"To The Broken Heart" (致分手)	Kevin Yi	JJ Lin	Yao Hung, Phil Wen	4:09
9.	"As Time Goes By" (時間會做的事)	Daryl Yao	Yu Heng	Yang Chao-yan	4:11
10.	"You Are Made of Water" (妳是水作的)	Yuen Chen	Mo Yanlin	Terence Teo	3:34
11.	"Just For You" (值得為你)	Shadya Lan	Liu Dajiang	JerryC	4:05
Total length:					43:49

== Concerts ==
Concert Name	Date	Location	Special guests
To Interested Person Concert (致，有圓人 唱談會)	February 15, 2015	Taipei, Taiwan; Taipei City Government-Parent-Child Theater	Hebe, Ella

== Music videos ==
Title	Director	Release date	Link
"Just For You" (值得為你)	Da-Bing (大餅)	August 28, 2014	MV
"Watch Me Now" (看我的)	Shockley Huang (黃中平)	December 22, 2014	MV
"Love You For Who You Are" (一人水一項)	Li Bo-En (李伯恩)	January 7, 2015	MV
"3.1415..."	Shockley Huang (黃中平)	January 18, 2015	MV
"Multiple Choice" (自選曲)	Xu Yun-Ting (徐筠庭)	February 1, 2015	MV
"To The Broken Heart" (致分手)	CHANG CHING YU@PINGCHI	February 15, 2015	MV
"As Time Goes By" (時間會做的事)	CHANG CHING YU@PINGCHI	March 13, 2015	MV
