= Dream a New Dream =

EP (渺小) by Selina Jen
- Released: 16 December 2011
- Genre: Mandopop
- Length: 0:13:30
- Language: Mandarin
- Label: HIM International Music, WOW Music
- Producer: Bing Wang, S.H.E

Selina Jen chronology
Dream a New Dream (2011)	3.1415 (2015)

Dream a New Dream (Chinese: 重作一個夢) is the debut single album of Taiwanese Mandopop artist Selina Jen, of girl group S.H.E. It was released on 16 December 2011 by HIM International Music and contains three tracks. The EP comes with a bonus DVD containing 2 music videos and making-of, and a set of 7 postcards.

== Track listing ==
No.	Title	Lyrics	Music	Arrangement	Length
1.	"愛我的每個人" (Everyone Who Loves Me)	Daryl Yao	JJ Lin	Jason Huang	4:34
2.	"夢" (Dream)	Selina Jen	Jay Chou	Jason Huang	4:32
3.	"重作一個夢" (Dream a New Dream)	Kevin Tsai	Wang Leehom	David Lu	4:19
Total length:					13:25

== Bonus DVD ==
1. To My Dear… From Selina
2. "Everyone Who Loves Me" MV
3. "Dream" MV
4. "Everyone Who Loves Me" MV behind the scenes

== Music videos ==
Title	Director	Release date	Link
"Everyone Who Loves Me" (愛我的每個人)	Bill Chia (比爾賈)	October 28, 2011	MV
"Dream" (夢)	Bill Chia (比爾賈)	December 12, 2011	MV
