= Fantasy Land World Tour =

2004–2006 concert tour by S.H.E

- Tour by S.H.E
- Location: Asia, North America
- Start date: September 4, 2004
- End date: January 7, 2006
- No. of shows: 9

S.H.E concert chronology
- Fantasy Land World Tour (2004–2006); Perfect 3 World Tour (2006–2009)

Fantasy Land World Tour (Chinese: 奇幻樂園世界巡迴演唱會) is the first world tour by Taiwanese girl group S.H.E.

The tour started in the Taipei Stadium, Taiwan on September 4, 2004, and the tour ended in Genting Highlands, Malaysia on January 7, 2006, as the final performance, and the world tour extended from Asia to North America. The tour had a total of 9 performances.

== Tour dates ==
List of tour dates
Date	City	Country	Venue	Attendance
September 4, 2004	Taipei	Taiwan	Taipei Municipal Stadium	25,000
October 30, 2004	Shanghai	China	Hongkou Stadium	25,000
November 6, 2004	Kuala Lumpur	Malaysia	Bukit Jalil National Stadium	40,000
December 25, 2004	Las Vegas	United States	MGM Grand Garden Arena	—
January 8, 2005	Singapore		Singapore Indoor Stadium	—
September 23, 2005	Beijing	China	Workers' Stadium	50,000
September 25, 2005	Xi'an	China	Coca-Cola Stadium	—
November 12, 2005	Nanjing	China	Nanjing Olympic Sports Center	—
January 7, 2006	Genting Highlands	Malaysia	Arena of Stars	—
Total				240,000

=== Cancelled dates ===
Date	City	Country	Venue
January 15, 2005	Guangzhou	China	Tianhe Sports Center

== Live albums ==
Fantasy Land Tour 2004 in Taipei

Live album by S.H.E
- Released: January 14, 2005
- Recorded: September 4, 2004
- Venue: Taipei Stadium
- Genre: Mandarin pop
- Label: HIM International Music

S.H.E's live album chronology
Fantasy Land Tour 2004 in Taipei (2005)	Perfect 3 World Tour Live @ Hong Kong (2006)

Fantasy Land Tour 2004 in Taipei (Chinese: 奇幻樂園台北演唱會; pinyin: Qíhuàn Lèyuán Táiběi Yǎnchàng Huì) was released on 14 January 2005, and is S.H.E's first live album. The songs in this album are direct visual recordings from S.H.E's Taipei concert during their "Fantasy Land World Tour". Unlike their other CDs, this cannot be played as one, but is instead designed to run as a DVD.

=== Track listing ===
VCD 1
中東風情 The Winds of Arabia
01. "The Winds of Arabia" Opening (中東風情 Opening)
02. "Persian Cat" (波斯貓)
03. "I.O.I.O."
04. Talking I
05. "Faraway" (遠方)
06. "Tropical Rainforest" (熱帶雨林)
07. Talking II
08. "Watch Me Shine"
09. "If You're Happy, Then I'll Be Pleased" (你快樂我隨意)
10. "Give Me More" (給我多一點)

江南情懷 Love South of the River
11. "Love South of the River" Intro (江南情懷 Intro)
12. "Ocean of Love" (愛情的海洋)
13. "Belief"
14. "Longing for Each Other" (長相思)
15. "Ten-Sided Ambush" (十面埋伏)
16. Talking III
17. "He Still Doesn't Understand" (他還是不懂)
18. "Where's Love" (愛呢)
19. Talking IV
20. "Heavy Rain" (落大雨)

VCD 2
巴洛克 Baroque
01. "Swan Lake" Intro (天鵝湖 Intro)
02. "Remember"
03. "天使在唱歌"
04. Talking V
05. "Only Lonely"
06. "A Safe Sense" (安全感)
07. "Half-Sugarism" (半糖主義)
08. Talking VI
09. "Yes I Love You"
10. "Flowers Have Blossomed" 花都開好了

美麗新世界 Genesis
11. "Genesis" Intro (美麗新世界 Intro)
12. "Genesis" (美麗新世界)
13. "Beauty Up My Life"
14. Talking VII

朋友組曲 Friendship Songs
15. "Wherever Dreams Are, There Friends Will Be" (有夢有朋友)
16. "Celebration" (分享)
17. "Must Make Friends Again Tomorrow" (明天也要作伴)
18. Talking VIII
19. "Fascination" (魔力)
20. "Always On My Mind"

Encore
21. Encore
22. "Super Star"
23. Talking IX
24. "Not Yet Lovers" (戀人未滿)
25. Ending
