= Bull Fighting (TV series) =

2007 Taiwanese television series

- Promotional poster
- Also known as: 鬥牛，要不要; Dou Niu, Yao Bu Yao; Hooping Dulcinea; Freestyle
- Genre: Romantic comedy
- Directed by: Liu Jun Jie
- Starring: Mike He; Hebe Tien; Lee Wei
- Opening theme: "鬥牛要不要" (Do you want a bull-fight) – Tank (Taiwanese singer)
- Ending theme: "最近還好嗎" (How Are You Lately?) – S.H.E
- Country of origin: Taiwan
- Original language: Mandarin
- No. of episodes: 17

Production
- Executive producer: Liao Jian Xing
- Running time: 60 mins

Original release
- Network: Taiwan Television (TTV)
- Release: 18 November 2007 – 9 March 2008

Related
- Ying Ye 3 Jia 1 (樱野3加1); Fated to Love You (命中注定我愛你)

Bull Fighting (Chinese: 鬥牛，要不要; pinyin: Dou Niu, Yao Bu Yao?; lit. 'Do you want a bull-fight'?) is a 2007 Taiwanese drama starring Mike He, Hebe Tien, and Lee Wei. The series was broadcast on free-to-air Taiwan Television (TTV) (台視) from 18 November 2007 to 9 March 2008, on Sunday at 22:00 and cable TV Sanlih E-Television (SET) (三立電視) from 24 November 2007 to 15 March 2008, on Saturday at 21:00. The word 鬥牛 in this context actually means street basketball.

== Cast ==
- Mike He (賀軍翔) as Shen Ruo He 沈若赫
- Hebe Tien (田馥甄)as Yi Sheng Xue 伊勝雪
- Lee Wei (李威) as Jin Zi Cong 金子聰
- Liang Zhe (亮哲) as Zhou Bi Shou 周必守
- Huang Pai Jun (黃柏鈞) as Xu Zhe Kai 徐哲凱
- Godfrey Gao (高以翔) as Tank 坦克
- Ding Chun Cheng (丁春誠) as Roma
- Cao Wei Xuan (曹維軒) as Mu Yu 木魚
- George Zhang (張兆志) as Run Yi 潤乙
- Chang Li Ren (張力仁) as Ah Jia 阿嘉
- Jian Chang (檢場) as Yi Chuan Wu 伊全武
- Cyndi Chaw (趙詠華) as Gao Jie Mei 高潔美
- Ai Wei (艾偉) as Shen Guo Shen 沈國琛
- Tan Ai Zhen (譚艾珍) as Mrs. Shen 沈老夫人
- Xie Qi Wen (謝其文) as Sausage vendor 香腸伯
- Hu Kang Xing (胡康星) as Bi Xiao Xiu 畢小修
- Peggy Zheng (曾珮瑜) as Liang Yu Qin 梁羽親
- Lin Shou Jun (林秀君) as President He 賀總裁
- Wang De Sheng (王德生) as Butler Shi 石管家
- Ke Huan Ru (柯奐如) as He Qian Na 賀千那
- Chen Wei Han (陳威翰) as Jia Bao Bei 賈寶貝
- Wang Xin Yi (王心宜) as Mei Fei 梅妃
- Zhang Yong Zheng (張永正) as Uncle Louie
- Wang Juan (王琄) as Bo Luo Shen 菠蘿嬸
- Chien Te-men (乾德門) as School doctor
- Zhu De Gang (朱德剛) as Guan Fu Lu 官福祿
- Judy Zhou (周定緯) as Michael
- Chen Han-dian as Unemployed man
- Lene Lai (賴琳恩) as 學校秘書

== Synopsis ==
In the annual basketball showdown held in a district, a young woman harbors a deep-rooted affection for the team called Trio, stemming from a childhood rescue by its players on the 13th Street Basketball Court years ago. However, when Trio's reign as champions is shattered, she finds herself disheartened. This year, three privileged friends from East Sun College represent Trio, but a chance encounter with the team's leader, Sheng Rou He, leads to an unexpected rivalry.

Unbeknownst to her, Sheng Xue's childhood friend and the leader of her protective entourage, Jin Zi Cong, played a role in Rou He's mishaps on the day of the match. What ensues is a series of revenge plots and unexpected twists, with Sheng Xue vowing to avenge Trio's loss.

Amidst the feud, Sheng Xue's feelings toward Rou He slowly transform, while Rou He is caught between familial obligations and his own complicated past. As the battle for control over the 13th Street unfolds, a fake relationship is forged, leading to a complex web of emotions that even Zi Cong watches with a heavy heart.

== Soundtrack ==
Bull Fighting Original Soundtrack

Soundtrack album by Various Artists
- Released: 7 December 2007
- Genre: Mandopop
- Length: 61:47
- Language: Mandarin
- Label: HIM International Music

Bull Fighting Original Soundtrack (CD+DVD) (鬥牛要不要 電視原聲帶) was released on 7 December 2007 by Various Artists under HIM International Music. It contains twenty songs, twelve of which are various instrumental versions of the eight original songs. The album also includes a DVD. The opening theme song is "Dou Niu Yao Bu Yao" or "Do You Want To Bull Fight?" by Tank, while the ending theme song is by S.H.E entitled "Zui Jing Hai Hao Ma?" or "How Are You Lately?".

The album won Best Original Soundtrack at the 2009 HITO Radio Music Awards presented by Taiwanese radio station Hit FM.

=== Track listing ===
No.	Title	Singer(s)	Length
1.	"Do You Want To Bull Fight" (鬥牛要不要 (Dou Niu Yao Bu Yao))	Tank (Taiwanese singer)
2.	"How Are You Lately?" (最近還好嗎 (Zui Jing Hai Hao Ma?))	S.H.E
3.	"Yell" (叫)	Zheng Nan (鄭楠)
4.	"Love Was Here" (愛來過)	S.H.E
5.	"Trapped Beast" (困兽)	Judy Zhou (周定緯)
6.	"Too Late" (來不及)	Hebe Tian
7.	"Back" (背影)	Yoga Lin
8.	"Cattle Grazing Party" (放牛 Party)	Zhang Jia Wei (張家瑋)
9.	"On The Verge inst." (一觸即發)
10.	"When I Think of You inst."
11.	"Gangster Daughter inst." (極道千金)
12.	"How Are You Lately? inst." (最近還好嗎)
13.	"Standoff inst." (對峙)
14.	"Bull Teasing inst." (逗牛)
15.	"Crisis inst." (危機)
16.	"Magical Youth inst." (迷幻青春)
17.	"Provoke inst." (挑釁)
18.	"After the War inst." (戰爭之後)
19.	"Bullfighting of Love inst." (愛的鬥牛)
20.	"It's Snowing in the Ball Court inst." (球場下雪了)

DVD
No.	Title	Length
1.	"Bull Fighting behind-the-scene footage" (18 mins)

== International broadcast ==
- Bull Fighting aired in the Philippines in GMA Network from 2 November 2009 – 23 November 2009, in Tagalog-dubbed. Bull Fighting's name has been changed into Freestyle. Also, the original audio with English subtitles being broadcast in TeleAsia Chinese from 12 April 2014.
