= S.H.E is the One World Tour =

2009–2010 concert tour by S.H.E

- Tour by S.H.E
- Location: Asia, Oceania
- Start date: October 16, 2009
- End date: September 17, 2010
- No. of shows: 12

S.H.E concert chronology
- Perfect 3 World Tour (2006–2009); S.H.E is the One World Tour (2009–2010); 2gether 4ever World Tour (2013–2014)

S.H.E is the One World Tour (Chinese: 愛而為一世界巡迴演唱會) is the third world tour by Taiwanese girl group S.H.E. A live album of the tour recorded at the Taipei Arena in May 2010 was released on March 4, 2011.

== Background ==
The tour started in the Hong Kong Coliseum, Hong Kong on October 16 and 17, 2009, and the tour ended in Sydney Entertainment Centre, Australia on September 17, 2010, as the final performance, and the world tour extended from Asia to Oceania. The tour had a total of 12 performances.

== Set list ==
Set list in Hong Kong
1. "Super Star"
2. "Boom"
3. "Super Model"
4. "Miss Universe" (宇宙小姐)
5. "Planet 612" (612星球)
6. "Tropical Rainforest" (熱帶雨林)
7. "Grey Sky" (天灰)
8. "Mayday" (五月天)
9. "How are you doing recently" (最近還好嗎)
10. "Flowers Have Blossomed" (花都開好了)
11. "London Bridge Is Falling Down" (倫敦大橋垮下來)
12. "How to do" (怎麼辦)
13. "Long Live Adorableness" (可愛萬歲)
14. "Dream a little dream of me" (Hebe solo)
15. "Wake me up before you go-go" (Selina solo)
16. "I am who I am" (我就是我) (Ella solo)
17. "Electric Shock" (觸電)(Broadway Version)
18. "Stay With Me" (鎖住時間)(10/16)
19. "Faraway" (遠方)
20. "Daybreak" (天亮了)(10/17)
21. "Half Sugarism" (半糖主義)
22. "I Love Trouble" (我愛煩惱)
23. "Satisfaction" (痛快)
24. "The Angel is Singing Intro" (天使在唱歌Intro)
25. "Golden Shield, Iron Cloth" (金鐘罩鐵布衫)
26. "Dreamland" (夢田)
27. "Wife" (老婆)
28. "Crazy Love" (愛到瘋癲)
29. "It's Quiet Now" (安靜了)
30. "Say You Love Me" (說你愛我)
31. "Simple love" (簡單愛) (Ella solo)
32. "Admiration" (崇拜) (Selina solo)
33. "Book of Exhilaration" (笑忘書) (Hebe solo)
34. "Loneliness Terminator" (終結孤單)
35. "Three Days and Nights" (三天三夜)
36. "Magic" (魔力)
37. "I. O. I. O"
38. "Persian Cat" (波斯貓)
39. "Don't Wanna Grow Up" (不想長大)
40. "Beauty Up My Life"
41. "Remember"
42. "Genesis" (美麗新世界)
43. Encore:
44. "Chinese" (中國話)
45. "Not Yet Lovers" (戀人未滿)
Set list in Taipei
1. "Super Star"
2. "Boom"
3. "Super Model"
4. "Miss Universe" (宇宙小姐)
5. "Planet 612" (612星球)
6. "Tropical Rainforest" (熱帶雨林)
7. "Grey Sky" (天灰)
8. "Mayday" (五月天)
9. "How are you doing recently" (最近還好嗎)
10. "Flowers Have Blossomed" (花都開好了)
11. "I Love Rainy Night Flower" (我愛雨夜花)
12. "London Bridge Is Falling Down" (倫敦大橋垮下來)
13. "How to do" (怎麼辦)
14. "Long Live Adorableness" (可愛萬歲)
15. "Dream a little dream of me" (Hebe solo)
16. "Wake me up before you go-go" (Selina solo)
17. "I am who I am" (我就是我) (Ella solo)
18. "Electric Shock" (觸電)(Broadway Version)
19. "Love So Right" (愛就對了)
20. "Daybreak" (天亮了)
21. "Half Sugarism" (半糖主義)
22. "I Love Trouble" (我愛煩惱)
23. "Satisfaction" (痛快)
24. "The Angel is Singing Intro" (天使在唱歌Intro)
25. "Golden Shield, Iron Cloth" (金鐘罩鐵布衫)
26. "Dreamland" (夢田)
27. "Wife" (老婆)
28. "Simple love" (簡單愛) (Ella solo)
29. "Admiration" (崇拜) (Selina solo)
30. "Book of Exhilaration" (笑忘書) (Hebe solo)
31. "Loneliness Terminator" (終結孤單)
32. "Three Days and Nights" (三天三夜)
33. Taiwanese Hokkien Suite:"Tea"+"Mother, Please Take Care"+"Farewell to the Seacoast"+"Huan Xi Jiu Hao"(台語組曲:茶噢+媽媽請妳也保重+惜別的海岸+歡喜就好)
34. "Magic" (魔力)
35. "I. O. I. O"
36. "Persian Cat" (波斯貓)
37. "Don't Wanna Grow Up" (不想長大)
38. "Beauty Up My Life"
39. "Remember"
40. "Genesis" (美麗新世界)
41. Encore:
42. "Chinese" (中國話)
43. "Shero"
44. Encore Again:
45. "You Won't Be" (你不會)
46. "Where's Love" (愛呢)
47. "Loving You" (愛上你)
48. "Faraway" (遠方)
49. "It's Quiet Now" (安靜了)
50. "Not Yet Lovers" (戀人未滿)

== Tour dates ==
Date	City	Country	Venue	Attendance
October 16, 2009	Hong Kong		Hong Kong Coliseum	20,000
October 17, 2009	Hong Kong		Hong Kong Coliseum	20,000
October 31, 2009	Shanghai	China	Shanghai Stadium	30,000
March 6, 2010	Kuala Lumpur	Malaysia	Bukit Jalil National Stadium	40,000
April 4, 2010	Luoyang	China	Luoyang New District Stadium	—
April 17, 2010	Singapore		Singapore Indoor Stadium	—
May 29, 2010	Taipei	Taiwan	Taipei Arena	12,000
June 26, 2010	Beijing	China	Capital Indoor Stadium	—
July 17, 2010	Macau		Cotai Arena	—
August 1, 2010	Hohhot	China	Hohhot City Stadium	—
August 14, 2010	Chengdu	China	Sichuan Gymnasium	4,000
September 17, 2010	Sydney	Australia	Sydney Entertainment Centre	—
Total				N/A

== Live albums ==
S.H.E Is the One

Live album by S.H.E
- Released: March 4, 2011
- Recorded: May 29, 2010
- Venue: Taipei Arena
- Genre: Mandarin pop
- Length: 4:36:00
- Label: HIM International Music
- Producer: Bing Wang

S.H.E's live album chronology
移動城堡香港演唱會; Perfect 3 World Tour Live @ Hong Kong (2006)	愛而為一演唱會影音館; S.H.E Is the One (2011)	2gether 4ever演唱會影音館 2gether 4ever Concert Live (2014)

S.H.E Is the one (Chinese: 愛而為一世界巡迴演唱會; pinyin: Ài Ér Wéi Yī Shìjiè Xúnhuí Yǎnchàng Huì) was released on 4 March 2011 on Blu-ray and DVD and features the Taipei stop of their "S.H.E is the One Concert Tour". It also includes a bonus DVD of behind the scenes, video messages from their mothers, Selina's wedding proposal and their KTV music videos.

=== Track listing ===
The concert had each member perform two solos. Selina and Hebe sang English songs for one of their solos while Ella sang a self-penned song. They performed different versions on some of their songs and the concert also featured songs from their Shero album.

1. Overture:"S. H. E Is the one"
2. "Super Star"
3. "Boom"
4. "Super Model"
5. "Miss Universe" (宇宙小姐)
6. "Planet 612" (612星球)
7. "Tropical Rainforest" (熱帶雨林)
8. "Grey Sky" (天灰)
9. "Mayday" (五月天)
10. "How are you doing recently" (最近還好嗎)
11. "Flowers Have Blossomed" (花都開好了)
12. "I Love Rainy Night Flower" (我愛雨夜花)
13. "London Bridge Is Falling Down" (倫敦大橋垮下來)
14. "How to do" (怎麼辦)
15. "Long Live Adorableness" (可愛萬歲)
16. "VCR of Ella's Adventure Story" (Ella的冒險故事VCR)
17. "Dream a little dream of me" (Hebe solo)
18. "Wake me up before you go-go" (Selina solo)
19. "I am who I am" (我就是我) (Ella solo)
20. "Electric Shock" (觸電)(Broadway Version)
21. "Love So Right" (愛就對了)
22. "Daybreak" (天亮了)
23. "Half Sugarism" (半糖主義)
24. "I Love Trouble" (我愛煩惱)
25. "Piquancy" (痛快)
26. "VCR of Three Little Girls' Wishes" (三個小女孩的願望VCR)
27. "The Angel is Singing Intro"+"Golden Shield, Iron Cloth"+"Dreamland" (天使在唱歌Intro+金鐘罩鐵布衫+夢田)
28. "Happy Birthday to ELLA"
29. "Wife" (老婆)
30. "Simple love" (簡單愛) (Ella solo)
31. "Admiration" (崇拜) (Selina solo)
32. "Book of Exhilaration" (笑忘書) (Hebe solo)
33. "Loneliness Terminator"+"Three Days and Nights" (終結孤單+三天三夜)
34. Taiwanese Hokkien Suite:"Tea"+"Mother, Please Take Care"+"Farewell to the Seacoast"+"Huan Xi Jiu Hao"+"S.H.E's Mothers' Debuts" (台語組曲:茶噢+媽媽請妳也保重+惜別的海岸+歡喜就好+熟女版S. H. E的初登場)
35. "Magic" (魔力) (S. H. E with you)
36. "I. O. I. O"
37. "Persian Cat" (波斯貓)
38. "Don't Wanna Grow Up" (不想長大)
39. "Beauty Up My Life"
40. "Remember"
41. "Genesis" (美麗新世界)
42. Encore:
43. "Chinese" (中國話)
44. "SHERO"
45. Encore Again:
46. "You Won't Be" (你不會)
47. "Where's Love" (愛呢)
48. "Loving You" (愛上你)
49. "Faraway" (遠方)
50. "It's Quiet Now" (安靜了)
51. "Not Yet Lovers" (戀人未滿)
52. Credit
