= Selina Jen =

Taiwanese singer

- 任家萱
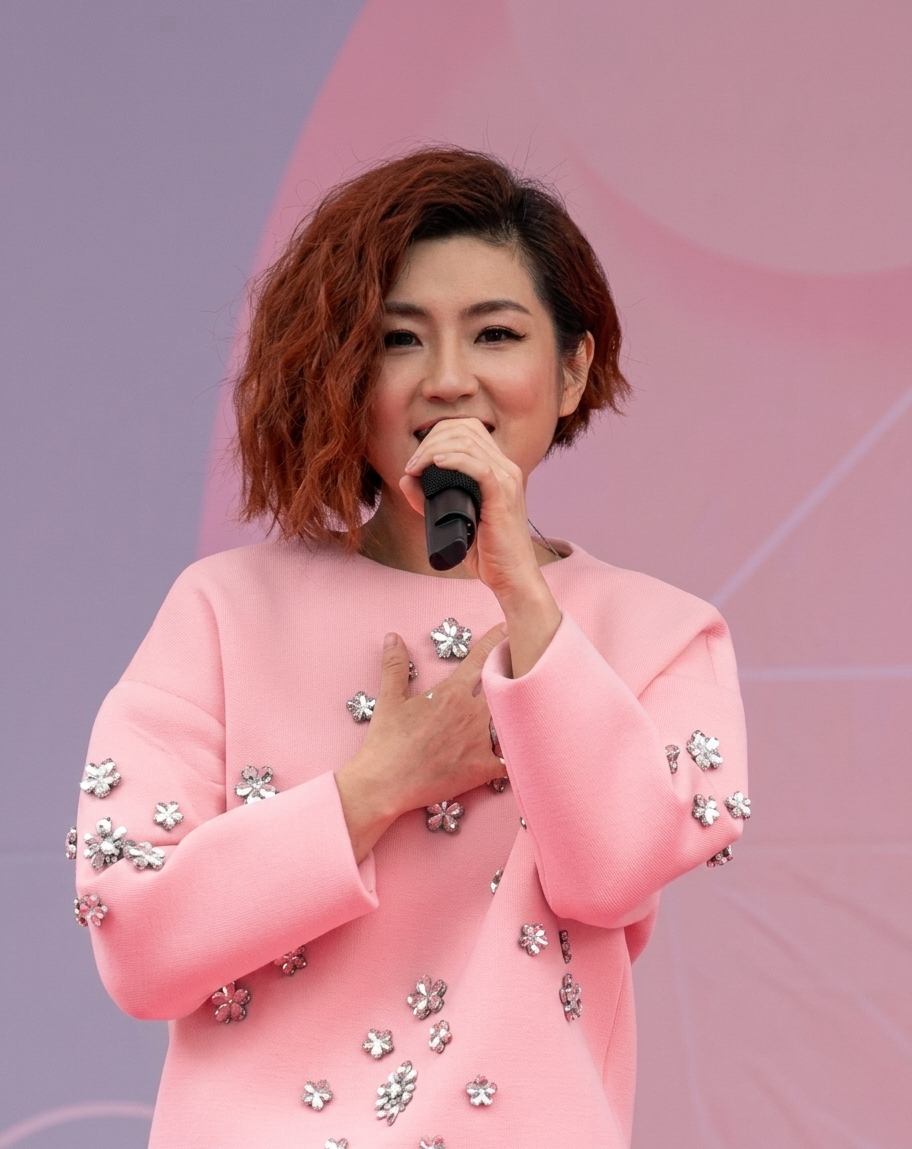
- Jen in 2015
- Born: Jen Chia-hsüan; Shilin, Taipei, Taiwan
- Occupations: Singer, actress, television host
- Years active: 2001–present
- Agent(s): The Beauty of Ren CO., LTD
- Spouse: Richard Chang (m. 2011; div. 2016)
- Partner: Xu (2022–present)
- Children: 1 son
- Family: Lorene Jen (sister)
- Musical career
- Genre: Mandopop
- Instruments: Vocals; guitar
- Member of: S.H.E

Chinese name
- Chinese: 任家萱
Transcriptions
Standard Mandarin
- Hanyu Pinyin: Rén Jiāxuān

Selina Jen Chia-hsüan (Chinese: 任家萱; pinyin: Rén Jiāxuān) is a Taiwanese singer, television host and actress. She is a member of the Taiwanese girl group S.H.E. On 11 June 2004, she graduated from the National Taiwan Normal University with a Bachelor of Education degree, majoring in Civic Education and Leadership.

On 22 October 2010, Jen was seriously injured in an explosive accident while filming the television series I Have a Date with Spring (我和春天有个约会), along with co-star Yu Haoming. Jen suffered third-degree burns on more than 54% of her body and needed to undergo skin grafting treatment/operation where her hands, legs, and back were injured.

Her sister is actress and singer Lorene Ren.

== Career ==
On 8 August 2000, HIM International Music held a 'Universal 2000 Talent and Beauty Girl Contest' in search for new artists to be signed under their label. Her younger sister Lorene Ren had wanted to join but she was too young. Instead, Jen joined the contest in her place. The contest had about 1000 contestants and after many tiring rounds of competing, seven contestants were left for the 'Cruel Stage' round. The three members of S.H.E were formed from here.

Following the competition, the record company gave all seven contestants an audition. Jen was the eventual winner of the contest. She caught the judges' attention in the first round by performing Coco Lee's "Before I Fall in Love" and entered the final round with "The Closest Stranger". She also sang "Reflection" by Christina Aguilera. Due to her nervousness during the final round, Jen was called out twice, and when she was announced the winner, she was doubtful because there were other contestants who had not been called out. However, all three future members of S.H.E were signed together under HIM International Music.

The name Selina was chosen by her company after taking a personality test; which represents "gentleness". The name initially had two possible spellings: Selina and Selena. Jen eventually chose "Selina" simply because she would be able to dot the i.

Jen collaborated with Tank, a singer-songwriter with HIM, on the song "Solo Love Song" (獨唱情歌), as well with Leehom Wang, for "You're a Song Inside My Heart" (你是我心内的一首歌), a song from his 12th studio album Change Me.

In September 2006, Jen released a bead-design book, Selina Loves Beading (愛的小珠珠).

=== Solo career ===
On December 16, 2011, Jen released her debut solo EP, Dream a New Dream (Chinese: 重作一個夢), which was produced during her rehabilitation following a severe burn accident while filming in mainland China. The lead single, "Everyone Who Loves Me" (Chinese: 愛我的每個人), was composed by JJ Lin with lyrics by Daryl Yao, was first premiered on the official HIM International Music website on October 29. The song "Dream" (夢) was composed by Jay Chou with lyrics written by Jen, through which she chronicled the pain, struggle, hope, and gratitude she experienced over more than 400 days of rehabilitation. This marked their reunion as collaborators following their 2008 work, "It's Quiet" (Chinese: 安靜了). Additionally, television host Kevin Tsai contributed the lyrics to the title track, "Dream a New Dream" (Chinese: 重作一個夢).

On January 19, 2015, Jen released 3.1415, her first solo studio album under her own name in 13 years since her debut. The album uses the digits of pi to decode Jen's personality, with the concept reflected in both the song content and the album's overall theme. On February 15, 2015, she held her first solo concert as an individual in Taipei.

Since 2018, Jen has experienced persistent vocal issues that have yet to be fully resolved. Although an examination by an otolaryngologist confirmed that there were no structural abnormalities in her vocal cords, and she subsequently sought both professional vocal training and psychological counseling, the underlying cause of the condition remains unidentified; she has suggested that the issue may involve a shift in her vocal resonance and voice placement. Jen has stated that singing has become a source of psychological pressure, leading her to indefinitely postpone plans for her second solo album and all singing-related engagements. She intends to prioritize her career as a television host while awaiting a full recovery of her vocal health.

On December 6, 2019, Jen released a cover of the viral TikTok song "Heart Like Still Water" (Chinese: 心如止水). This release marked her return to singing following the vocal struggles she faced in 2018, and served as her first musical work since the establishment of her own studio, The Beauty of Ren Limited (Chinese: 任真美好). The release garnered significant attention from fans. Her manager clarified that there were no underlying issues with Jen's vocal cords, attributing her previous inability to sing to psychological pressure. The manager reassured fans and noted that the singing style of this new single differs from her signature warm and sweet vocal style. A series of short comedic promotional videos was subsequently released from December 9 to 11.

On October 11, 2020, Jen released her new single, "All year round" (Chinese: 四季), marking her first musical release in 11 months. Announcing that she had overcome her inner fears and emerged from a slump caused by vocal loss, she stepped behind the scenes for the first time to take part in the song's production.

As of January 2021, Jen ventured into the F&B industry with packed porridge as her first line of products. Her company is known as "Ren Sing Eat Shot" (Chinese: 任性eat下). She occasionally shares Vlogs of her food and hiking experiences on her YouTube channel.

On December 17, 2021, Jen released her personal digital EP, My Own Beauty. The EP features three tracks: "My Own Beauty" (Chinese: 往美的路我要自己作主), "Joyful Loneliness" (Chinese: 居里夫人), and " We Are All the Same" (Chinese: 你我他). Jen contributed to the songwriting and composition for two of the tracks.

On 1 April 2022, Jen's first horror movie, The Funeral (Chinese: 頭七) was released where she plays the role of a mother. This marks her first appearance in a film nearly twelve years after her accident.

On April 29, 2022, Jen released her second solo studio album My Own Beauty. It was her first physical album released under her own independent studio, The Beauty of Ren Limited. The album contains a total of eight tracks, including two instrumental versions. One of the songs, "In The Dark" (Chinese: 黑夜中相擁), serves as the theme song for the film The Funeral (Chinese: 頭七). The physical release is available in two editions: a standard edition and a limited edition featuring a gold-foiled serial number (0001–1031). The limited edition, strictly capped at 1,031 copies, was made available for pre-order on April 8 and sold out within two hours.

On 31 October 2022, her birthday, Selina launched her first original podcast, titled "Ying Ren Er Jie" (Chinese: 迎任而解; pinyin: Yíng Rèn Ér Jiě). From that date onward, new episodes were released every Monday at 12:00 noon. On 28 October 2024, the day before her 43rd birthday, Selina announced that she had decided to temporarily suspend "Ying Ren Er Jie" (Chinese: 迎任而解; pinyin: Yíng Rèn Ér Jiě) starting on 31 October, her birthday.

== Personal life ==
Prior to her accident, Jen was on her way to becoming a TV show host. On 22 October 2010, Jen suffered third-degree burns on 54% of her body, mostly her back and legs, during an indoor shooting in Shanghai for the musical series I Have a Date with Spring (我和春天有個約會). Jen was discharged the following year on 19 January 2011, and held a press conference, stating her condition and her intention to return to work.

On 29 May 2010, during a concert at the Taipei Arena, Jen revealed that lawyer Richard Chang (張承中) was her boyfriend. She married Chang on 31 October 2011. On 4 March 2016, through a post on her Facebook page, Jen announced that she and Chang were planning a divorce. The divorce was finalized on 27 April.

In March 2022, six years after her divorce, Jen confirmed that she was dating Xu, a non-celebrity seven years her junior. On 13 March 2023, Jen announced on her social media "Podcast" accounts that she was expecting her first child with Xu. On 7 September, Jen announced the birth of her son.

According to TVBS World Taiwan, on 26 December 2023, Jen's team announced that Rensingeatshot would conclude operations in January 2024. They added that the decision would not impact the company's collaborations with other brands.

== Discography ==
=== Studio albums ===
Album #	Album	Released Date	Label
1st	3.1415	9 January 2015	HIM International Music

=== Extended plays ===
Album #	Album	Released Date	Label
1st	Dream a New Dream	16 December 2011	HIM International Music
2nd	My Own Beauty	29 April 2022	The Beauty of Ren Limited

=== Singles ===
Title	Released Date	Label	Notes
Heart Like Still Water	6 December 2019	The Beauty of Ren Limited	Cover version

== Concerts ==
Concert name	Date	City	Country	Special guests	Venue
To the Fated: Live in Concert & Talk	February 15, 2015	Taipei	Taiwan	Hebe, Ella	Taipei City Government Taipei Family Theater

== Filmography ==
=== Television series ===
Year	English title	Original title	Role	Notes/Ref.
2003	The Rose	薔薇之戀	Zhuang Zhe Qing (莊哲芹) (Deceased/flashback in each Episode); Di Ya Man (狄雅蔓) (Episode 8, 9, 10)	
2004	Happey 2004	新年快樂2004	Selina	
2005	Reaching for the Stars	真命天女	Zhou Xin Lei (周心蕾)	
2015	Someone like You	聽見幸福	TV host	Cameo

=== Film ===
Year	English title	Original title	Role	Ref.
2004	A Disquised Superstar	冒牌天皇	Selina	
April 1, 2022	The Funeral	頭七	Li Chun-hua (李春華)	

=== Hosting ===
Year	English title	Original title	Co-host	Notes/Ref.
2002, 2007, 2010	Guess	我猜我猜我猜猜猜	Jacky Wu, Aya Liu (2002); Jacky Wu, Hebe Tien (2007); Harlem Yu (2010)	
2007-2008	Kangsi Coming	康熙來了	Kevin Tsai	Guest host
2014	QQ Music Awards	QQ音乐巅峰盛典	Mickey Huang	
2014	49th Golden Bell Awards	第49屆金鐘獎	Sam Tseng	
2014-2015	Taipei New Year's Eve Party	台北最High新年城	Ella Chen, Plungon	
2017	52nd Golden Bell Awards	第52屆金鐘獎	Mickey Huang	

=== Music video appearances ===
Year	Song title	Artist
2003	"Leaf" ("葉子")	A-Sun
2017	"Full Name" ("連名帶姓")	A-mei

== Awards and nominations ==
Year	Award ceremony	Award	Work	Result	Ref.
2012	Music Radio China Top Chart Awards	Best New Artist (HK/Taiwan)	—N/a	Won	
2013	48th Golden Bell Awards	Best Host in a Variety Show	33 Small Universe (Chinese: 小宇宙33號)	Nominated	
2015	Global Chinese Golden Chart Awards	Best New Artist	3.1415	Gold Award	
2015	Global Chinese Golden Chart Awards	Most Popular New Artist	3.1415	Won	
2016	Music Radio China Top Chart Awards	Music Radio Recommended Artist Award (HK/Taiwan)	—N/a	Won	
2016	Music Radio China Top Chart Awards	Media Recommended Album (HK/Taiwan)	3.1415	Won	
2016	Music Radio China Top Chart Awards	Top 30 Songs of the Year	"Watch Me Now" (Chinese: 看我的)	Won	
