= Tank (Taiwanese singer) =

Taiwanese singer-songwriter

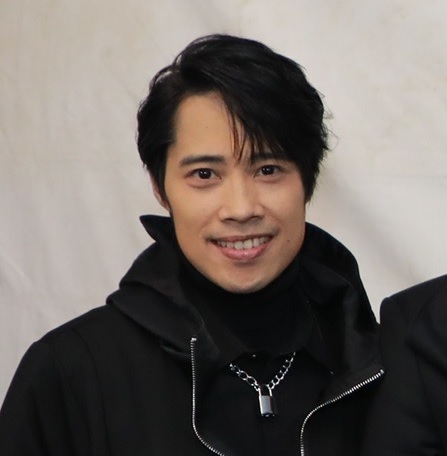
- Tank in 2022
- Born: Lü Jianzhong; 6 February 1982 (age 44); Taitung, Taiwan
- Occupations: Singer-songwriter, composer, record producer, guitarist, pianist
- Years active: 2006–2012; 2016–present
- Spouse: MerMer (m.2012, d.2014)
- Children: Hua Hua (呂樺樺) b. May 2012

Chinese name
- Traditional Chinese: 呂建中
- Simplified Chinese: 吕建中
Transcriptions
Standard Mandarin
- Hanyu Pinyin: Lǚ Jiànzhōng
- Musical career
- Origin: Taiwan
- Genres: Mandopop, acoustic rock
- Instruments: Piano, guitar
- Label: HIM International Music (2006–present) Join Us Music (宙爾斯音樂)
- Website: www.him.com.tw

Lü Jianzhong (Chinese: 呂建中; born 6 February 1982), better known by his stage name Tank, is a Taiwanese singer-songwriter. He is currently signed to HIM International Music. His debut album, Fighting (生存之道; Fighting, The Law of Surviving) was released on 23 February 2006. His latest album, The 3rd Round, was released on 31 May 2009.

== Biography ==
Lü was born in Taitung, Taiwan. He is a native Taiwanese: his father is from the Ami people, while his mother is Puyuma. Tank married his girlfriend of two years, MerMer, on 28 September 2012. The wedding was originally planned for the end of 2011 but was postponed due to the unexpected arrival of their daughter, Hua Hua, who was born in May 2012.

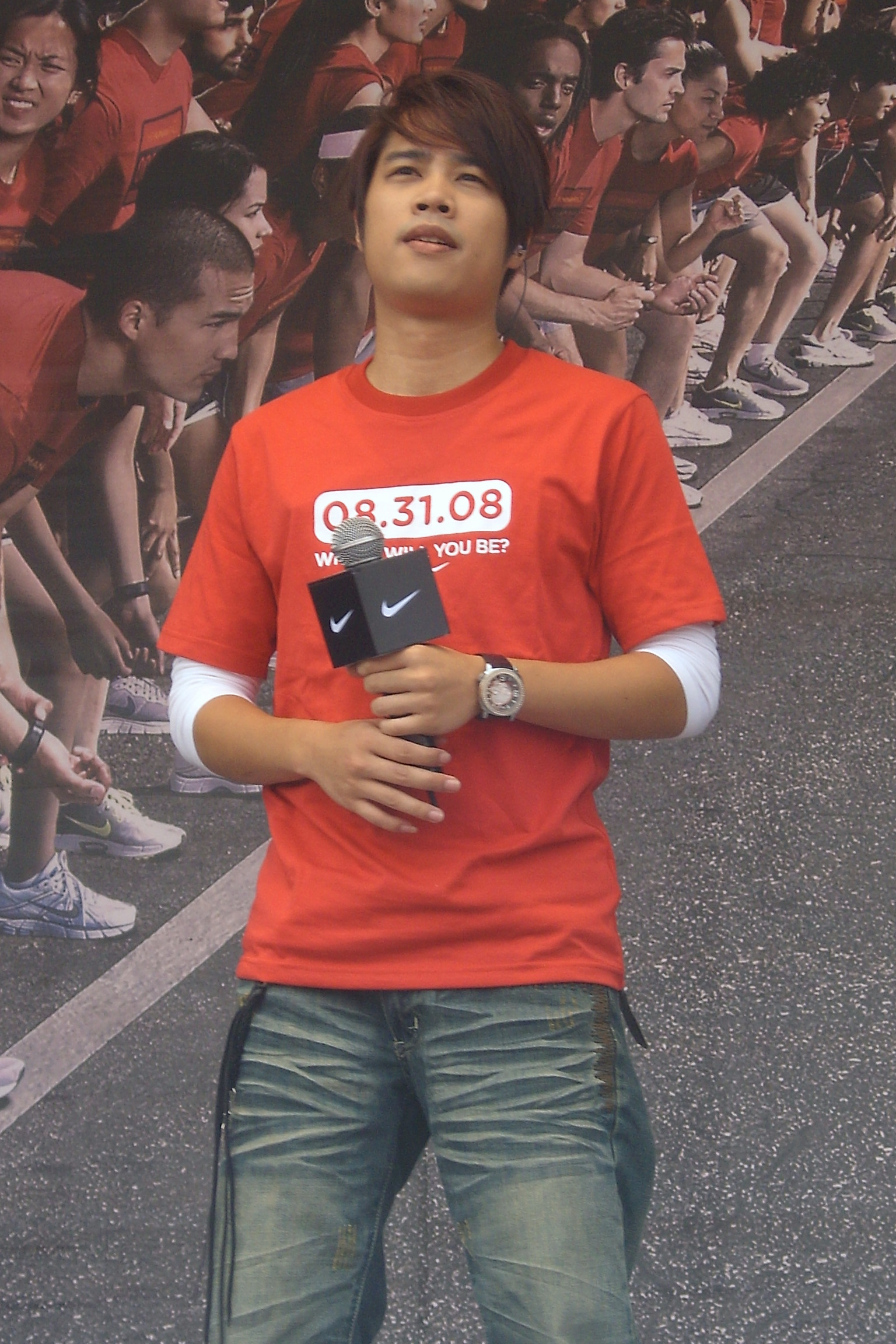
Tank at the 2008 The Nike+ Human Race in Taipei

Tank also suffers from congenital heart disease. He suffered a heart attack on 26 December 2007, and his sister died from a sudden heart attack in December 2006, and his aunt died also from a heart attack several months later. In 2009, he had a cardioverter-defibrillator implanted to regulate his heart beat.

Before releasing his debut album, Lü helped write songs for Vic Chou and S.H.E, among many other artists. He wrote the music and lyrics for track "Letting You Go" (我讓你走了), which was released by Taiwanese artist Will Pan in his third album Wu Ha. By the age of 21, he was already recognized for composing more than 200 songs. He was said to be the next big thing after David Tao and Jay Chou for his talents in composing songs, singing and dancing.

Two songs he composed, "Romance of Three Kingdoms" (三國戀) and "Give Me Your Love" (給我你的愛), became ending themes of Seven Swordsmen (七劍下天山) and KO One (終極一班) respectively. Another song, "Tears of a Thousand Years" (千年淚), was used as an ending theme for the drama serial The Little Fairy (天外飛仙). His second album Keep fighting (延長比賽; Keep fighting, The Extended Battle) was released on 19 January 2007. "Personal Angel" (專屬天使) was used for an ending theme of Hanazakarino Kimitachihe, a romantic comedy series. He was later requested by NCsoft to compose the theme song for the computer game, Guild Wars. "Intense Battle" (激戰) became the theme song for that game. In 2007, he recorded a song with his junior, Yoga Lin of Xing Guang Bang, for the idol series Bull Fighting (鬥牛 · 要不要) with the same name. He sang a duet in 2012 with Ella Chen from S.H.E from her E.P Wǒ jiùshì (＜我就是。。。＞) called Dǒng wǒ zài ài wǒ (＜懂我再爱我＞), which was also used in the soundtrack for her movie with Mike He <Bad Girl>.

== Discography ==
=== Studio albums ===
Album #	Name	Release date	Label
1st	Fighting (生存之道)	24 February 2006	HIM International Music
2nd	Keep Fighting (延長比賽)	19 January 2007	HIM International Music
3rd	The 3rd Round (第三回合)	29 May 2009	HIM International Music

=== Soundtrack contributions ===
Year	Album information	Tracks contributed
2005	KO One Original Soundtrack (終極一班 電視原聲帶)	"KO One aka The Extreme Class" (終極一班) – opening theme; "Give Me Your Love" (給我你的愛) – ending theme; "From Now On" (從今以後)
2006	Hanazakarino Kimitachihe Original Soundtrack (花樣少年少女 電視原聲帶)	"Special Angel" (專屬天使) – ending theme; "Understood" (懂了)
2006	The Little Fairy Original Soundtrack (天外飛仙 電視原聲帶)	Qiānnián lèi (千年淚, "Tears of a Thousand Years") – ending theme
2007	Bull Fighting Original Soundtrack (鬥牛要不要 電視原聲帶)	Dòuniú yào bùyào (鬥牛要不要, "Do You Want a Bull-Fight")
2009	ToGetHer Original Soundtrack (爱就宅一起 電視原聲帶)	Quán shìjiè dōu tíngdiàn (全世界都停電, "World Wide Blackout")

== Awards and nominations ==
Year	Award	Category	Nomination	Result	Ref
2006	Hong Kong TVB8 Awards	Best Singer-songwriter (Bronze)	Tank	Won	
2006	Hong Kong TVB8 Awards	Best New Male Artist (Silver)	Tank	Won	
2007	Hong Kong TVB8 Awards	Top 10 Gold Songs	"Street Bully" (街頭霸王)	Nominated	
2007	HITO Radio Music Awards; HITO流行音樂獎	Best New Male Artist	Tank	Won	
2008	HITO Radio Music Awards; HITO流行音樂獎	Top 10 Songs of the Year (Note: The order is not specified for the Top 10 Songs of the Year)	"Special Angel" (專屬天使)	Won	
2008	HITO Radio Music Awards; HITO流行音樂獎	Best Original Soundtrack	Hanazakarino Kimitachihe Original Soundtrack (Note: This is a shared award for his contribution to the album)	Won	
