= Emily Song =

Emily Song may refer to:

- Emily Ge Song, Chinese-American media executive
- Song Mi-jin (born 1979), South Korean singer
