= Duan Chun-hao =

Taiwanese actor

- 段鈞豪
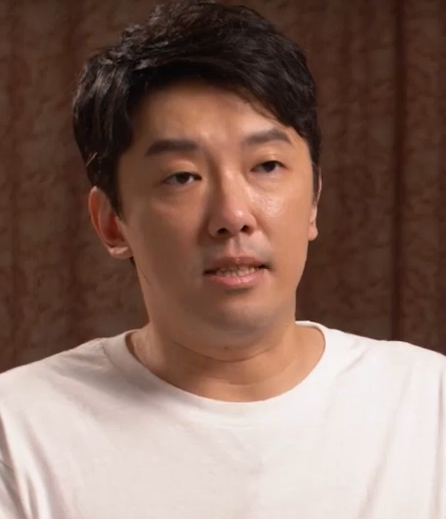
- Duan in April 2022
- Born: Taiwan
- Education: Beijing Film Academy
- Occupation: Actor
- Years active: 1997–present
- Children: 1

Duan Chun-hao (Note: Occasionally credited as Tuan Chun-hao) (Chinese: 段鈞豪) is a Taiwanese actor best known for his role as Hao-Hao in the romance film Millennium Mambo (2001). He received two nominations for Best Supporting Actor with his performances in Fancy 25 (2002) and We Are Champions (2019), in the 39th and 56th Golden Horse Awards respectively. In 2022, he earned a nomination for Best Supporting Actor in a Miniseries in the 57th Golden Bell Awards for portraying six different characters in the HBO Asia miniseries Twisted Strings.

== Early life ==
Duan studied performing arts at Hwa Kang Arts School. He was a basketball team member in junior high and high school. During high school, he suffered from a spinal disc herniation and underwent multiple surgeries, which led to him skipping mandatory military service. At the age of 16, he began working part-time as a production assistant while studying at Hwa Kang, including on projects by Chang Hwa-kun, who also offered him a bit part in the Japanese film Rainy Dog which he produced.

== Career ==
After graduating from Hwa Kang, Duan continued working as a production assistant and was invited by Chang to star in films, including the 2000 titles A Chance to Die and The Cabbie. Chang also recommended him to filmmaker Hou Hsiao-hsien, who signed Duan as an actor in 1999 when he was 18. At the age of 19, Duan landed a lead role as Hao-Hao alongside Shu Qi in Hou's 2001 romance film Millennium Mambo. That same year, he had a recurring role in the drama series Kiss of the Toast, which garnered him public recognition.

In 2002, he starred in the anthology film Fancy 25, which garnered him a nomination for Best Supporting Actor in the 39th Golden Horse Awards. Following this, Duan decided to further his studies in acting at the Beijing Film Academy, where he stayed for eight years and even purchased a home in Beijing. During this time, he participated in several film projects, including lead roles in the 2007 film Reflections directed by Yao Hung-i, a colleague under Hou Hsiao-hsien, and the 2011 Chinese romantic comedy Single No More.

Duan returned to Taiwan in 2014 and pursued a television career, landing a leading role in the series Our Mother. He also starred in the 2017 drama film Missing Johnny, as well as the 2018 films Cities of Last Things and Long Day's Journey into Night. In 2019, he played the lead role as Chen Shu-wen in the sports drama film We Are Champions, portraying the coach of a high school basketball team, which earned him nominations for Best Supporting Actor in the 56th Golden Horse Awards and the 22nd Taipei Film Awards. He has also appeared in the Japanese film First Love, directed by Rainy Dog's director Takashi Miike, and in the crime series CSIC 2.

In 2020, he took on a lead role in the drama film Eclipse and a recurring role in the romance series Falling into You. Duan had another breakthrough performance in the 2022 HBO Asia series Twisted Strings, where he portrayed six different characters, including as a mortician, a pimp, a homosexual, and a police detective. His performance earned him a nomination for Best Supporting Actor in a Miniseries or Television Film in the 57th Golden Bell Awards. In 2023, he had a lead role in the drama film Be With Me and a recurring role in the 2024 crime series Not a Murder Story.

== Personal life ==
Duan briefly dated Malaysian actress Angelica Lee in 1996. He was in a two-year relationship with fellow Hwa Kang alumnus Yvonne Yao from 2015 to 2017. In the same year, he began a relationship with an Amis native woman, and the two married in November 2018. They welcomed a daughter in April 2020.

== Filmography ==
=== Film ===
Year	Title	Role	Notes/Ref.
1997	Rainy Dog	—N/a	Bit part
2000	A Chance to Die	Hao (小豪)	
2000	The Cabbie	Thief	
2001	Millennium Mambo	Hao-Hao (豪豪)	
2002	Fancy 25	De-di (德地)	
2007	Reflections	Hao (小豪)	
2011	Single No More	Lang (小朗)	
2017	Missing Johnny	Hao (張致豪)	
2018	Cities of Last Things	Yao (小姚)	
2018	Long Day's Journey into Night	The Ex-husband	
2019	We Are Champions	Chen Shu-wen (陳書文)	
2019	First Love	Fu	
2020	Eclipse	Fang Guo-liang (方國樑)	
2023	Be With Me	The Manchurian Pilot	
2023	Miss Shampoo	Boss Hsing (興哥)	

=== Television ===
Year	Title	Role	Notes/Ref.
2001	Kiss of the Toast	Hao (小豪)	Recurring role
2004	Say Yes Enterprise	Hsu (徐子)	Recurring role
2014	Our Mother	Chiu Chi-long (邱志龍)	Main role
2019	CSIC 2	Leo (李奧)	Recurring role
2020	Falling into You	Chiang Hsiao-chung (江兆中)	Recurring role
2022	Twisted Strings	Hexa role	Co-starring
2022	Mother	Hao (豪哥)	Recurring role
2022	Women in Taipei	Deputy Head of Customer Service	Cameo
2022	Shards of Her	Chen Ming-qian (陳明謙)	Cameo
2023	Copycat Killer	Yang Wen-hai (楊文愷)	Recurring role
2023	Taiwan Crime Stories	Wang Qi (王奇)	Co-starring
2024	Not a Murder Story	Hung De-an (洪德安)	Recurring role
2024	The On1y One	Sheng Min-yang (盛明陽)	Recurring role
2024	Born for the Spotlight	Chang Kuo-lung (張國龍)	Guest role

== Awards and nominations ==
Year	Award	Category	Work	Result	Ref.
2002	39th Golden Horse Awards	Best Supporting Actor	Fancy 25	Nominated	
2019	56th Golden Horse Awards	Best Supporting Actor	We Are Champions	Nominated	
2020	22nd Taipei Film Awards	Best Supporting Actor	We Are Champions	Nominated	
2022	57th Golden Bell Awards	Best Supporting Actor in a Miniseries or Television Film	Twisted Strings	Nominated	
