= Asuka Kijima =

Japanese fashion model and entertainer

- 貴島 明日香
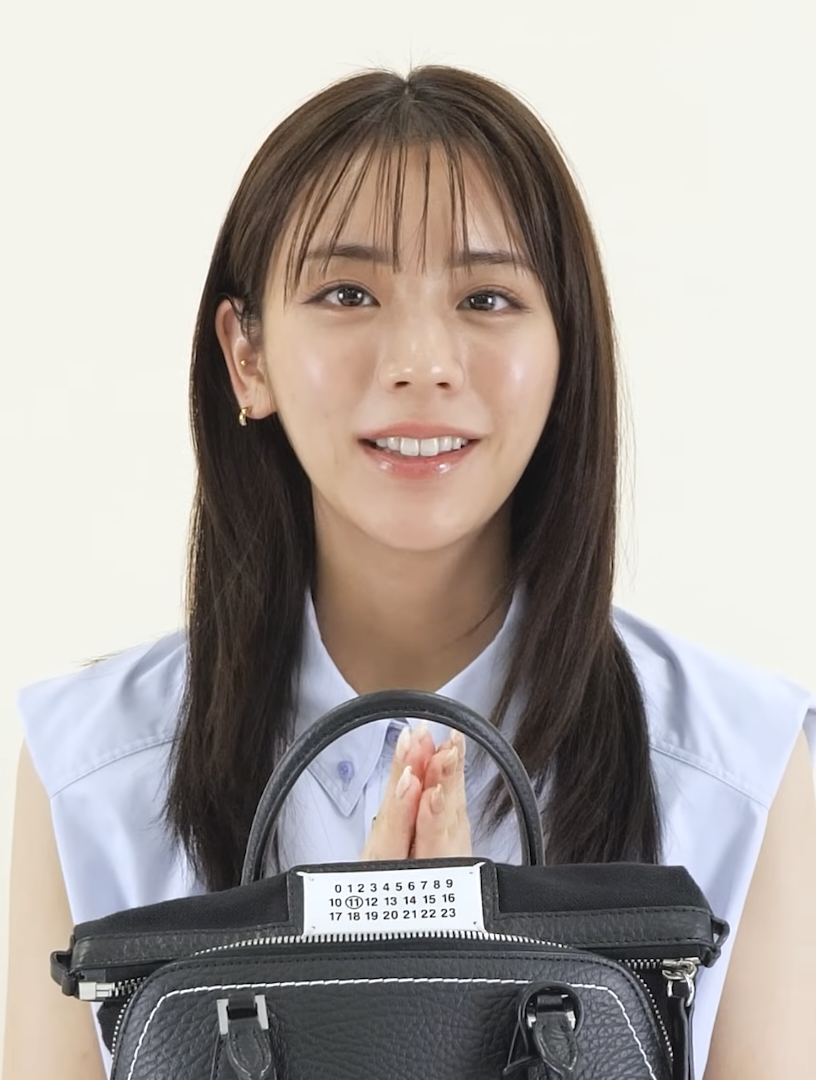
- Born: February 15, 1996 (age 30); Kobe, Hyōgo Prefecture, Japan
- Occupations: Model; announcer
- Years active: 2014–present
- Agent(s): TRAPEZISTE Co., Ltd.
- Spouse: Unknown (m. 2024)

YouTube information
- Channel: あすかさんち。
- Years active: 2020–present
- Subscribers: 507 thousand
- Views: 72.3 million
- Last updated: October 14, 2026

Asuka Kijima (貴島 明日香, Kijima Asuka; born February 15, 1996) is a fashion model, entertainer, YouTuber, and ABEMA announcer. She is from Kobe, Hyōgo Prefecture, Japan. She is signed to TRAPEZISTE.

== Life and career ==
At the end of her first year of high school, she was scouted by a female staff member at a model office in Kansai at Sannomiya Center Street and took lessons. She began modeling in her third year of high school, appearing in shows like "Kobe Collection", Kansai Collection, and "Tokyo Runway".

She moved to Tokyo in April 2015 at the age of 19. As soon as she moved to Tokyo, she appeared in a TV commercial for Suntory's "Iemon Tokucha", and also modelled for other advertisements. She also appeared in music videos and television dramas to expand her career. She won first place in the second consecutive magazine issue of the serialized project "WHO'S THE Next" for men's fashion magazine warp MAGAZINE JAPAN. She was also appointed as the "KOBE Minato Ambassador" for the second consecutive time at the SANNOMIYA COLLECTION.

From April 3, 2017, to April 1, 2022, Kijima was the seventh weather presenter of ZIP!, aired on Nippon TV. This was both her first live broadcast program and her first regular appearance on a TV program. (Note: In the same program, she is the fourth person to be appointed as a weather caster from a fashion model (all odd-numbered generations are fashion models (1st generation: Moyoko Sasaki, 3rd generation: Mikiho Niwa, 5th generation: Miku Sakakibara)).) In June 2021, she won first place in the "17th Favorite Weather Caster/Weather Forecaster Ranking" by Oricon.

Among her predecessors at ZIP!, no weather presenter had served for more than two years, but Kijima was a weather presenter there for five years. She announced her graduation from the program on March 25, 2022, with her final appearance as a weather presenter being aired on April 1, 2022. Though she has graduated, she continues to appear irregularly on ZIP!.

Beginning in the November issue released on September 20, 2018, Kijima became an exclusive model for the magazine non-no.

On August 24, 2019, she became an ambassador for Kobe City Cruise Weeks. Her first calendar was released on November 2. On July 22, 2020, she was appointed as the official "Nyan Ambassador" for "Neko ga Kawaii Dake Exhibition: The Distance!". On October 15, she announced the opening of her official YouTube channel "Asukasanchi." On November 24, MASK WEAR TOKYO released "Neko Mask", designed after Kijima's cats Towa and Taiga.

Beginning April 11, 2021, she has been DAM CHANNEL's 18th MC.

On April 25, 2022, Kijima released her first photobook "Asukashiki."

On August 4, 2022, she became the official announcer for ABEMA.

== Personal life ==
She is the eldest of five siblings, having two younger sisters and two younger brothers.

Her favorite foods are ramen, curry rice, and hamburg steak, especially cheese in hamburg steak. Kijima has stated that she likes hamburg steak so much that she eats it more than three times a week. Her favorite sweets are Mont Blanc cake and wagashi. She also likes high balls and whiskey. She dislikes fish.

She enjoys walks and playing games. Kijima plays games like Nintendo Switch and PlayStation 4 as well as Apex Legends so often she can be said to be a "gamer girl". She sometimes hides her real name and meets ordinary people she met in game.

Her specialty is typing. According to Kijima, she was the fastest in her grade during middle school. She also holds an Information Processing Certification, which she obtained when she was in high school. Although it was only for 10 months, she belonged to a judo club in middle school. She worked part time during high school and did not take part in any clubs.

In professional baseball, she is a fan of the Yomiuri Giants. On June 21, 2019, she threw the first pitch for an interleague play between the Giants and Softbank at Tokyo Dome. As a child, she often visited Kobe Sports Park Baseball Stadium. During ZIP! when she visited the stadium, now Hotto Motto Field Kobe, she commented that she once visited with her family and watched a game of the Orix Blue Wave (now Orix Buffaloes).

On July 5, 2024, she announced her marriage to a movie director.

== Filmography ==
=== Films ===
Year	Title	Role	Ref.
2016	Cutie Honey: Tears		

=== Television shows ===
Year	Title	Role	Notes	Ref.
2014	Dear Sister		Fuji TV	
2017–2022	ZIP!	Weathercaster	Nippon TV. Regular April 2017 – April 2022. Quasi-regular since June 2022.	
20??–present	G753TV	MC	Television Saitama	
20??–present	MIDTV	MC	Television Saitama	
2019	Your Home Is My Business!	TV Reporter	Nippon TV. First and final episodes.	
2020	Shanai Marriage Honey	Shinkawa Marina	MBS	
2021	My Daughter Can't Get a Boyfriend!!	Aoba	Nippon TV. Episode 3.	
2021	I Don't Know If It's a Lie or the Truth The overkill urban legend The drama	Eri	TV Tokyo. "Prophetic Dream". Lead role.	
2021	Puzzle & Dragons	Cameos	TV Tokyo	
2021	Bank Over! ~The Weakest Heist in History~	Koharu Saruwatari	Nippon TV	
2021–2022	TokyoGOOD!		TV Tokyo	
2022	Luminous Music Special Vocaloid Festival 2022	MC	NHK	
2022	Chūmon no ōi hatsu kyanpu		TV Asahi. Co-starring with Yui Yokoyama, Nishimura Mizuki (Viking).	
2022	Kaere Mandy Mikketai!!・Niku Aruki		TV Asahi. Co-starring with Taka and Toshi, Daisuke Takahashi, Nana Takagi, Jun Mizutani.	
2022	Metropolitan Police Department, First Investigative Division Chief	Sorami Tadano	TV Asahi. Season 6, Episode 9.	
2022	Sugoi Sora Misemasu! Gekiteki Kishō Museum		NHKBSP	
2022	Convenience Store Heroes ~Your SOS Itadakimashita!!~	Kamigishi Sakura	Kansai TV and others. Episode 5.	

=== Web series ===
Year	Title	Role	Notes	Ref.
2021	Alcoholism 50		Abema. Episode 4.	
2022	Short Program	Asako Takazawa	Amazon Prime Video. Lead. Episode 4.	
2022	We Got Married (Season 4)	Herself	Abema. With Yuki Kubota.	

=== Radio ===
- Weekend Fun (Rainbow Town FM, August 29, 2020)
- PlayStation presents My Game & My Life with Lime Star Udamaru (TBS Radio, May 13, 2021)

=== Web program ===
- Yurufuwa Time (July 17, 2022 – YouTube「Yurufuwa Time」)- MC

=== Karaoke ===
- DAM Channel (April 11, 2021–)- MC

=== Game ===
- eBASEBALL Professional Baseball Splits 2021 Grandslam (July 2021, Konami)- As herself

=== Commercials ===
- Elemental Story (August 22, 2015)
- Lotte "Simon Tonegawa Edition"
- Suntory Iemon Tokucha・Tokucha Caffeine Zero
- Elemental Story「With Everyone」
- Honda「Honda Cars」 (Kinki Area Only)
- Shimamura「Let's play in a one piece」
- AEON「TOPVALU HOME COORDY」 (2017)
- Shiseido「Junpaku Senka Suppin Snow White Essence」 (2019)
- Himawari Securities Co., Ltd. (December 20, 2019)
- DHC ULUMiNISTA「Protect your beauty, busy every day」 (April 17, 2020–)
- DANBALL ONE「Want to buy cheap cardboard」「Trouble finding a place to put cardboard boxes」 (2020)
- Galibaa (2020)
- Nissui「Edamame Konbu Rice Balls with Sticky Barley!」『Breakfast Reporter』 (2020)
- DHC「Dense urumi color lip balm 」(September 11, 2020)
- Refrear「Clear contact lense」 (2020)
- Trend Micro「Virus Buster for Home Network」(2020)
- Air Doctor×ZIP!, Kiyo Pyrethrum "Portable Air Doctor Deodorant"(January 8, 2021)
- YB-LAB.「Glamorous leggings」 (November 27, 2021–)
- KATE「Lip Monster 」 (April 2022 )
- Pierrot (May 2022)
- Clinic Fore (May 2022)
- FREEDiVE「MUGEN WiFi」

=== Music video ===
Year	Song title	Artist	Ref.
2016	"Feel So Alive"	Sandaime J Soul Brothers	

=== Event ===
- KOBE COLLECTION
- KANSAI COLLECTION
- TOKYO RUNWAY
- SAPPORO COLLECTION
- Fashion Cantata from KYOTO
- m-int kobe FashionShow
- NAMBA FASHION FESTA
- Japan Women's Expo
- OSAKA KAWAii!!
- MARUKO
- HARAJUKU WEEK
- IZA

== Books ==
=== Magazine ===
- non-no (November 2018 issue–, Shueisha) – Exclusive model

=== Digital photobook ===
- Spi/San Gravure Photobook『Smile Tomorrow』 (Shogakukan – Published June 29, 2020)
- FRIDAY Digital Photobook『透明な素肌 (Transparent Bare Skin)』 (Kondasha – Published January 29, 2021)
- Spi/San Gravure Photobook『New World』 (Shogakukan – Published February 15, 2021)

=== Calendar ===
- Asuka Kijima 2020 Calendar (TRIX, November 2, 2019)
- Asuka Kijima 2021 Calendar (TRIX, October 24, 2020)
- Asuka Kijima 2022 Calendar (TRIX, November 1, 2021)

=== Photobook ===
- Asukashiki.(Published April 25, 2022, Shogakukan, Photography: Kazutaka Nakamura, Leslie Kee, Maki Taguchi)

== Other ==
- One Day Police Chief Koiwa Police Station (December 13, 2021)
- One Day Police Chief Atago Police Station (March 10, 2022)

== See also ==
- List of people from Kobe city
