= Song Ge =

Song Ge may refer to:

- Ehesuma, Chinese composer
- Emily Ge Song, Chinese-American media executive
