= Puff Kuo =

Taiwanese singer, actress and model

- 郭雪芙
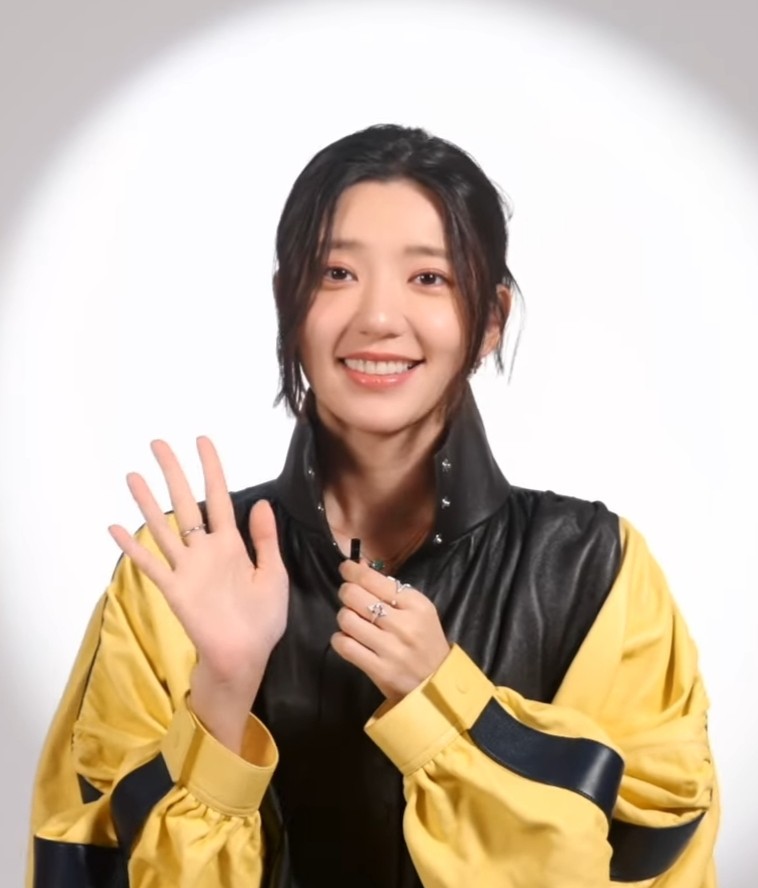
- Kuo in July 2024
- Born: 30 June 1988 (age 37); Gongliao Township, Taipei County, Taiwan (now New Taipei City Gongliao District)
- Education: Hsing Wu University of Science and Technology
- Occupations: Actress, singer
- Years active: 2008–present
- Musical career
- Instrument: Vocals
- Labels: Linfair Records (2011–2015); Dorian International Entertainment (2008–present)

Puff Kuo (Chinese: 郭雪芙; pinyin: Guō Xuěfú; born 30 June 1988) is a Taiwanese actress, singer, model, and was the youngest member of Taiwanese girl group Dream Girls until their disbandment.

In 2008, Kuo was scouted by talent agents and in 2010, she joined girl group Dream Girls. In 2011, Dream Girls released their debut EP and in the same year, Kuo appeared in her debut television series Inborn Pair.

== Early life ==
Kuo was born on 30 June 1988 in Gongliao Township, Taipei County, Taiwan. Her mother died from breast cancer when she was 9, leaving her and her younger sister to be cared for by relatives while her father worked in China for many years..

== Career ==
=== 2008–2010 ===
Kuo debuted as a commercial model in 2008. Her first television appearance was in a McDonald's commercial that aired in Taiwan. After her commercial appearance, she was discovered by Dorian Entertainment, which she signed on as her management company. During this time, she and future group members Tia Lee and Emily Song of Dream Girls were under training before officially debuting as a group. Kuo had several appearances in variety shows such as Guess, 100% Entertainment, and Kangxi Lai Le and appeared in numerous music videos.

=== 2011–2012 ===
In December 2011, Kuo had her first acting role in SETTV's drama Inborn Pair, playing the supporting role of the daughter of a triad boss. Inborn Pair was a ratings success and saw the boost in popularity of its stars.

In 2012, Kuo starred in her first film, Silent Code. That same year she starred in another SETTV drama entitled Miss Rose, playing the supporting role of a spoiled fiancée to lead actor Roy Chiu's character. In December, Dream Girls released their second group EP Girl's Talk.

=== 2013–present ===
In 2013, Kuo made a cameo appearance in Fabulous Boys, the Taiwanese remake of the popular Korean idol drama You're Beautiful. That same year she also got her first lead role, opposite Aaron Yan in SETTV's Just You, playing the role Cheng Liang Liang. The Kuo and Yan pairing was well received, and the two won the "Best Screen Couple Award" at the 2013 Sanlih Drama Awards. The same year in December, Dream Girls released their debut studio album.

At the beginning of 2014, Kuo became a part of the second season of We Got Married Global Edition. Super Junior's Kim Heechul appeared as Kuo's partner in the variety show. Her appearance on the variety show helped boost her popularity outside of Taiwan.

In April 2014 Kuo was cast in Pleasantly Surprised. In Pleasantly Surprised, Kuo starred opposite popular male model and actor Jasper Liu, whom she first met and previously collaborated with for a short comedy skit at the 2013 Golden Bell Awards presentation show, where they played a couple as leads in a romantic idol drama. For her role in Pleasantly Surprised, she played an aspiring French chef with a cold and calm demeanor who eventually opens up and falls in love with her handsome sunshiny co-worker played by Liu. Kuo and Liu's chemistry as a screen couple was successful and well received by critics and viewers. The two won the "Best Kiss" award at the 2014 Sanlih drama awards. Kuo also showed that her popularity was rising outside of Taiwan when she won the "China Wave Award" at the same ceremony.

=== Music ===
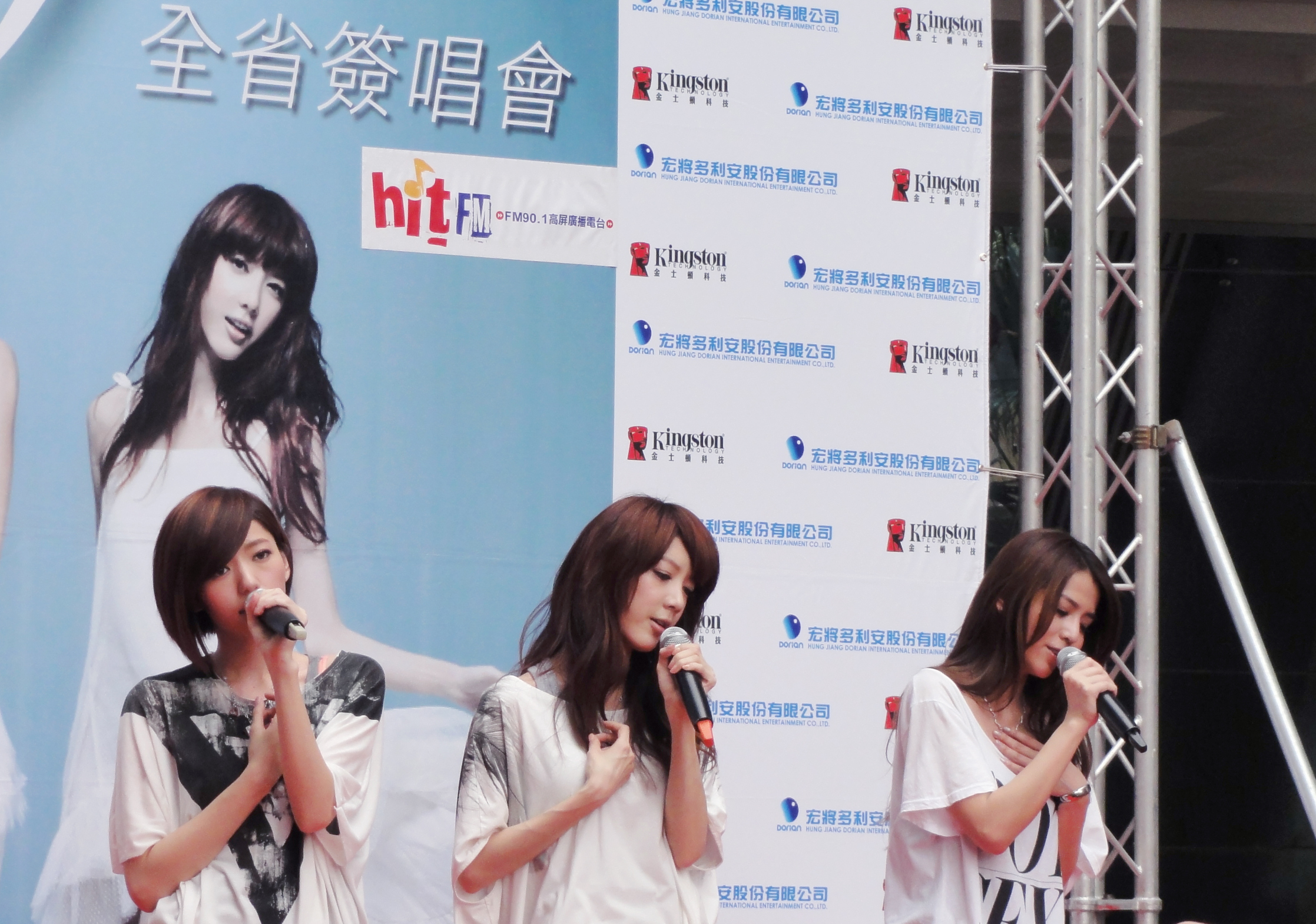
Dream Girls' Puff Kuo (left) during their autograph session on 14 May 2011

After Kuo's group Dream Girls signed on March 23, 2011, with Linfair Records, they debuted on April 8 with the release of their EP Dream Girls (美夢當前). The group's second album, titled "Girl's Talk," debuted on 7 December 2012.

After starring in We Got Married Global Edition, Kuo's popularity soared in South Korea and her group Dream Girls was the only Taiwanese music act invited to the "2014 Asia Song Festival" held in Busan, South Korea. Kuo served as a guest emcee at the event.

In late 2014, after Pleasantly Surprised finished filming, Kuo took a break from acting to work on Dream Girls' next album and a photo book that was scheduled for release in December 2014.

== Personal life ==
When growing up Kuo was raised by her father's relatives while her younger sister lived with her mother's relatives. Kuo and her younger sister were estranged from each other until Kuo entered the entertainment industry and was able to provide for her sister.

Kuo is a cat lover who owns 3 cats, one of whom she rescued on a busy highway and later adopted.

== Filmography ==
=== Television series ===
Year	Chinese title	English title	Role	Notes
2011	真愛找麻煩	Inborn Pair	Li Er	
2012	螺絲小姐要出嫁	Miss Rose	Vivian Jiang	
2013	原來是美男	Fabulous Boys	Herself	Cameo
2013	就是要你愛上我	Just You	Cheng Liangliang	
2014	喜歡·一個人	Pleasantly Surprised	Du Kai Qi	
2016	滾石愛情故事－我是真的付出我的愛	Rock Records in Love – I Truly Give My Love To You	Cheng Si-ai	
2016	相愛穿梭千年2：月光下的交換	Shuttle Love Millennium 2	Fang Ziyi	
2018	媚者无疆	Bloody Romance	Liu Guang	
2019	我們不能是朋友	Before We Get Married	Zhou Wei Wei	
2020	因爲我喜歡你	Falling Into You	Chen Zi Tong	
2020	浪漫輸給你	Lost Romance	Liu Mu Shuang	Cameo
2021	20年的約定	20 Years Promise	Ke Yi Qing	Lead Role
2021	華燈初上	Light the Night	Wang Ai-lien (Aiko)	
2022	我曾愛過你，想起就心酸	I Once Loved You, Thinking of You Makes my Heartache	Yang Mo	Main Cast
2022	朝歌	Zhao Ge	Yan Jiu	Supporting Role
2022	她和她的她	Shards of Her	Ke Ke	Supporting Role
2022	正義的算法	Small and Mighty	Lin Xiao-yan	Lead Role
2023	此時此刻	At the Moment	Yang Qianqian	
2024	不如海邊吹吹風	Breeze by the Sea	Li Hai-nuo	

=== Feature film ===
Year	Original title	English title	Role
2012	BBS鄉民的正義	Silent Code	Lan Yiqíng
2013	變身	Machi Action	Su Yingying
2019	古窯迷蹤	Lost in the Cave Dwelling	Chang Hsiaoyen
2021	揭大歡喜	As We Like It	Lo Lin
2023	山中森林	Lost in Forest	Alice

=== Short film ===
Year	Original title	English title	Role
2012	You never alone	You Never Alone	Fei Fei
2012	康健霓小姐的愛情微電影		Kang Ni
2012	Dream Girls微電影「減嘆日記」系列	Dream Girls Series	
2013	分享爱 第一部曲 (爱的心田)		Puff Kuo

=== Appearance on Variety Shows ===
Date	Original title	English title	Role
5 April 2014 – 12 July 2014	我們結婚了 世界版 第二季	We Got Married World Edition Season 2	Guest, as Kim Hee Chul's partner
8 April 2016 – 24 June 2016	火星情報局 第一季	Mars Intelligent Agencies Season 1	Deputy Director
4 November 2016 – 20 January 2017	火星情報局 第二季	Mars Intelligent Agencies Season 2	Deputy Director
1 July 2017 – 22 September 2017	火星情報局 第三季	Mars Intelligent Agencies Season 3	Deputy Director
October 2018 – December 2018	火星情報局 第四季	Mars Intelligent Agencies Season 4	Deputy Director

=== Music video appearances ===
Year	Song title	Details	Video
2008	Lonely So Much (寂寞那麼多)	Singer(s): Nicholas Teo 張棟樑; Album: From Now On New Songs + Best Selection	Video on YouTube
2008	Dream	Singer(s): Stanly Xu 許仁杰; Album: Dream (夢見)	Video on YouTube
2009	Song (新歌)	Singer(s): Danson Tang 唐禹哲; Album: D' New Gravity (D新引力)	Video on YouTube
2009	Guardian (守護者)	Singer(s): Where Chou 周蕙; Album: Where Chou album (周蕙 (專輯))	Video on YouTube
2009	If...If...	Singer(s): Andy Hui 許志安; Album: Song Person (歌人)	Video on YouTube
2010	Like It's Nothing (若無其事)	Singer(s): Jaycee Chan 房祖名; Album: Chaos	Video on YouTube
2011	Love Conquest (戰利品)	Singer(s): Lollipop F; Album: DANCE	Video on YouTube
2011	Dandelion (蒲公英)	Singer(s): Leo Li 李恭; Album:Leo Li 2011 Album 李恭2011同名专辑	Video on YouTube
2012	Black Coffee (黑咖啡)	Singer(s): Jody Chiang 江蕙; Album:To Marry (當時欲嫁)	Video on YouTube
2012	You Are My Deja Vu (你是我的 deja vu)	Singer(s):Yen-j 嚴爵; Album:	Video on YouTube
2013	I Suddenly Want To Love Her (突然好想愛她)	Singer(s): Ming Dao 明道; Album: Lovelorn Aesthetics (失戀美學)	Video on YouTube
2014	Unstoppable Sun (擋不住的太陽)	Singer(s): Aaron Yan 炎亞綸; Album: Drama	Video on YouTube
2014	No Cut Dance Version (一刀不剪 舞蹈版)	Singer(s): Aaron Yan 炎亞綸; Album: Cut	Video on YouTube
2015	I'm From A Star (我来自那颗星)	Singer(s): Alien Huang 黄鸿升; Album:	Video on YouTube

== Discography ==
=== Studio album ===
#	Original title	English title	Release date	Label
1st	美夢當前	Dream Girls	April 8, 2011	Linfair Records Limited/DECCA
2nd	Girl's Talk	Girl's Talk	December 7, 2012	Linfair Records Limited/DECCA
3rd	美麗頭條	Beautiful	December 27, 2013	Linfair Records Limited/DECCA

=== Single ===
Year	Name	Album name	Notes
2014	结巴	Scarlet Heart 2 Original Soundtrack	Yan Jue
2014	由你开始的幸福		

== Awards and nominations ==
Miscellaneous
▪ 2012 台湾新宅男女神网络 second place (winner)

▪ 2012 FHM Taiwan's 100 Sexiest Women in the World Section 4 (winner)

▪ 2012 3rd Apple Entertainment Awards "最受欢迎宅男女神奖" (winner)

▪ 2013 FHM Taiwan's 100 Sexiest Women in the World (winner)

▪ 2013 台湾新宅男女神网络 champion (winner)

▪ 2014 FHM Taiwan's 100 Sexiest Women in the World (winner)

▪ 2015 FHM Taiwan's 100 Sexiest Women in the World (winner)

▪ 2016 FHM Taiwan's 100 Sexiest Women in the World Section 2 (winner)

Music
▪ 2011 Kimo Yahoo Search Popularity Awards- Most Popular Female Artist Group Awards (winner)
Drama
▪ 2012 Kimo Yahoo Romantic Star Festival- Most Want To Date Idol Drama Actress Vote Section 2 (nominated)
