= Aaron Yan =

Taiwanese actor and singer

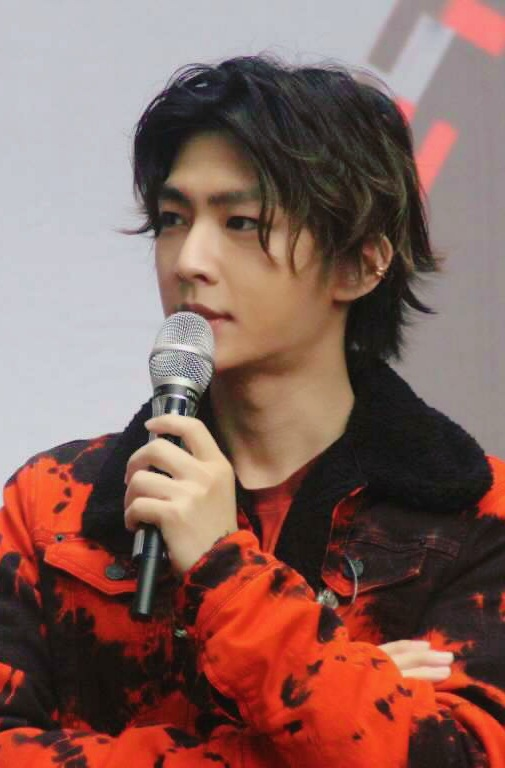
- Yan in January 2021
- Born: Wu Keng-lin; 20 November 1985 (age 40); Taipei, Taiwan
- Education: Chinese Culture University
- Occupations: Actor; singer; television host; businessman
- Years active: 2005–present
- Musical career
- Genre: Pop
- Instruments: Vocals; piano; guitar; flute; violin
- Label: Sony Music Taiwan
- Formerly of: Fahrenheit

Chinese name
- Traditional Chinese: 炎亞綸
- Simplified Chinese: 炎亚纶
Transcriptions
Standard Mandarin
- Hanyu Pinyin: Yán Yǎlún
Southern Min
- Hokkien POJ: Iām A-lûn

Aaron Yan (traditional Chinese: 炎亞綸; simplified Chinese: 炎亚纶; Pe̍h-ōe-jī: Iām A-lûn, born Wu Keng-lin on 20 November 1985) is a Taiwanese actor, singer, television host and businessman. He was also one of the members of Taiwanese boy band Fahrenheit.

== Life and career ==
=== 1985–2005: Early life and career beginnings ===
Yan was born as Wu Keng-lin in Taipei, Taiwan on 20 November 1985. When he was very young, he and his family moved to Connecticut, United States, where he lived for five years, and then moved back to Taiwan. In 2004, Yan posted some of his pictures on a public blog and was scouted by Taiwanese management company, Comic Productions. In August 2004, he made his acting debut in Taiwanese drama, I Love My Wife. In 2005, after signing with Comic Productions and HIM International Music, Yan starred in Taiwanese dramas, It Started with a Kiss and KO One.

=== 2005–2011: Fahrenheit ===
In December 2005, he formed a boy band named Fahrenheit with three other Taiwanese artists: Wu Chun, Jiro Wang, and Calvin Chen. In September 2006, Fahrenheit released their eponymous debut studio album, Fahrenheit, and they won a Hito Music Award for Best Boy Band.

In 2007, Yan reprised his roles in the sequels The X-Family and They Kiss Again. In November 2008, Yan played his first leading role in Taiwanese suspense drama, Mysterious Incredible Terminator. He also starred in Love Buffet and Gloomy Salad Days.

=== 2011–present: Solo career ===
In March 2011, Yan released his debut extended play, The Next Me. The album spent 5 weeks at the number 1 spot on the G-Music chart.

In May 2012, Yan starred in Taiwanese musical drama, Alice in Wonder City. In October 2012, he released his debut studio album, The Moment.

In June 2013, Yan starred in Taiwanese romantic comedy drama, Just You. The drama topped ratings in its timeslot during its run.

In February 2014, Yan starred in Taiwanese metropolitan romance drama, Fall in Love with Me. Yan won the Asia Star Award at the Seoul International Drama Awards. In May 2014, he released his second extended play, Drama. In June 2014, he released his third extended play, Cut.

In March 2015, Yan debuted in Japan with the single titled, "Moisturizing". The album debuted within the top ten spots on the Oricon Singles Chart. In September 2015, he released his second Japanese single, "Gelato".

In March 2016, Yan starred in Taiwanese workplace romance drama, Refresh Man. The drama was a massive hit both domestically as well as across Asia, boosting Yan's popularity to a new high. In June 2016, Yan released his third Japanese single "Monochrome Dandy". The single peaked at number 8 on the Oricon Singles Chart.

In 2017, Yan was cast in the Chinese romance drama, Memories of Love.

In 2018, Yan released his fourth extended play Where I Belong. The same year Yan released his fifth extended play Dear Monster which includes the single "Sleeping Titan".

In 2019, Yan starred as the male lead in period suspense drama Please Give Me a Pair of Wings. The same year, he co-starred in the romance comedy drama Kiss Love, and Taste.

On 7 May 2020, Yan launched his Taiwan mazesoba brand, Yan's Collection.

On 25 December 2020, Yan released sixth extended play "Metropolis" which comprises self-composed songs.

== Personal life ==
On 21 Jun 2023, Yan had recorded the videos of him having sex with a minor with the intention of sharing them. Yan claimed that he tried to the best of his ability to have an attorney help take the video down. Major public events have axed entertainer Aaron Yan from their programs, following allegations of sexual misconduct that have also cost him several commercial endorsements. On 9 December, The Shilin District Prosecutors’ Office charged Yan with violations of the Child and Youth Sexual Exploitation Prevention Act. On 30 May 2024, The Shilin District Court handed down a seven-month prison sentence, which was suspended for three years and can be commuted to a fine, the ruling said.

== Filmography ==
=== Film ===
Year	English title	Chinese title	Role	Notes/Ref.
2016	The New Year's Eve of Old Lee	過年好	Peter	
2019	Liao Zhai	聊齋系列之鞏仙	Kong Rong	
2023	Marry My Dead Body	關於我和鬼變成家人的那件事	Chen Chia-hao	

=== Television series ===
Year	English title	Chinese title	Role	Notes/Ref.
2004	I Love My Wife	安室愛美惠	Zheng Wangui	
2005	It Started with a Kiss	惡作劇之吻	A Bu	
2005	KO One	終極一班	Ding Xiaoyu	
2007	The X-Family	終極一家	Ding Xiaoyu, Jiu Wu	
2007	They Kiss Again	惡作劇2吻	A Bu	
2008	Mysterious Incredible Terminator	霹靂MIT	Zhan Shide	
2009	K.O.3an Guo	終極三國	Ding Xiaoyu, Jiu Wu	Cameo
2010	Love Buffet	愛似百匯	Xin Yicheng	
2010	Gloomy Salad Days	死神少女	Shen Qi, Gao Chao	
2011	Sunny Girl	陽光天使	Aaron	Cameo
2012	Alice in Wonder City	給愛麗絲的奇蹟	He Tingyu	
2013	Just You	就是要你愛上我	Qi Yi, Xiao Yi	
2014	A Time of Love	愛情来的時候	Chen Datian	
2014	Fall in Love with Me	愛上兩個我	Lu Tianxing, Xiao Lu	
2014	Seven Friends	七個朋友	Aaron	Cameo
2014	Dear Mom	我的寶貝四千金	Shika	Cameo
2016	Refresh Man	後菜鳥的燦爛時代	Ji Wenkai	
2018	Memories of Love	一路繁花相送	Lin Leqing	
2019	Please Give Me a Pair of Wings	請賜我一雙翅膀	Long Tianyu	
2019	Kiss, Love and Taste	親·愛的味道	Lin Xuan	
2020	Road ~ Taiwan Express	路 ~ Taiwan Express	Eric Liu	
2021	The Amazing Grace of Σ	我願意	Fei Muqi	

=== Reality shows ===
Year	Title	Chinese title	Note	Ref.
2019	Super Penguin League; Season:2	超级企鹅联盟 Super3	Player; Live Basketball Competition	

=== Hosting ===
Year	Program	Broadcast channel	Co-host
2015	Sanlih Drama Awards Ceremony	SETTV	Lulu Huang Lu Zi Yin
2020	36 Questions	PTS, Yahoo! TV, myVideo	Jesse Tang, Sandy Wu

=== Music video appearances ===
Year	Artist	Song title
2015	Selina Jen	"To the Broken Heart"
2017	Lulu Huang Lu Zi Yin	"Give It All to You"

== Discography ==
=== Studio albums ===
Year	English title	Chinese title	Label
2012	The Moment	紀念日	HIM
2014	Drama	—N/a	HIM
2014	Cut	—N/a	HIM

=== Extended plays ===
Year	English title	Chinese title	Label
2011	The Next Me	下一個炎亞綸	HIM
2018	Where I Belong	最想去的地方	HIM
2018	Dear Monster	親愛的怪物	HIM
2020	Metropolis	摩登原始人	Sony Music Taiwan

=== Singles ===
Year	English title	Chinese title	Notes
2007	"Willing to Not Love You"	願意不愛你	The X-Family OST
2014	"Taipei Dreamin'"	台北沉睡了	
2015	"Moisturizing"	—N/a	
2015	"Gelato"	—N/a	
2015	"As Long as You are Happy"	你幸福就好	I Am Sorry, I Love You OST
2016	"Monochrome Dandy"	—N/a	
2016	"Monologue"	独活	The Legend of Qin OST
2016	"Wooden Puppet"	木頭人	Love or Spend OST
2018	"Everlasting Moment"	最久的瞬間	Memories of Love OST
2019	"I Want To Fly"	我要飞翔	Please Give Me a Pair of Wings OST
2019	"Little Love Song"	小情歌儿	Kiss, Love and Taste OST

== Awards ==
Year	Award	Category	Nominated work	Ref.
2008	Singapore Hit Awards	Most Popular Duet	"TiAmo" (feat. Liu Liyang)	
2011	4th Top Chinese Music Awards Newcomer Ceremony	Most Popular New Artist		
2011	4th Mengniu Music Billboard Awards	Most Popular Male Singer		
2011	9+2 Music Pioneer Awards	Newcomer Award		
2011	9+2 Music Pioneer Awards	Top 10 Songs	"Only See You"	
2012	Hito Music Awards	Most Popular New Artist		
2012	Hito Music Awards	Best New Artist		
2012	2nd Global Chinese Golden Chart Awards	Best New Artist (Gold)	The Next Me	
2012	[Sprite] China Original Music Charts	Most Popular Idol (Taiwan)		
2012	[Sprite] China Original Music Charts	Media Recommendation Award (Taiwan)		
2012	3rd MY Astro Music Awards	Best New Artist (Overseas)		
2012	3rd MY Astro Music Awards	Best Song of the Year	"The Next Me"	
2013	12th MusicRadio China Top Chart Awards	Most Popular New Artist (Hong Kong/Taiwan)	The Moment	
2013	Hito Music Awards	Most Promising Male Singer		
2013	2nd Sanlih Drama Awards	Viewers Choice Drama Award	Just You	
2013	2nd Sanlih Drama Awards	Best Onscreen Couple (with Puff Kuo)	Just You	
2013	2nd Sanlih Drama Awards	Weibo Popularity Award	Just You	
2013	3rd Global Chinese Golden Chart Awards	Hit FM's Most Recommended Singer		
2013	3rd Global Chinese Golden Chart Awards	Top 20 Songs of the Year	"The Moment"	
2014	Singapore Hit Awards	Most Popular Male Singer		
2014	Singapore Hit Awards	All-Round Artist		
2014	Singapore Hit Awards	Favorite Album Cover (popular vote)	Cut	
2014	4th Sanlih Drama Awards	Viewers Choice Drama Award	Fall in Love with Me	
2014	4th Sanlih Drama Awards	Best Actor	Fall in Love with Me	
2014	4th Sanlih Drama Awards	Weibo Popularity Award	Fall in Love with Me	
2015	8th Top Chinese Music Awards	Most Popular Male Singer (Hong Kong/Taiwan)	Girlfriend	
2015	Hito Music Awards	Most Promising Male Singer		
2015	Hito Music Awards	HITO Star Award		
2015	10th Seoul International Drama Awards	Asia Star Award		
2018	9+2 Music Pioneer Awards	Most Popular Male Singer		
2018	9+2 Music Pioneer Awards	Most Popular Singer (online vote)		
2018	9+2 Music Pioneer Awards	Gold Song Award		
