= Tsukue no Nakami =

- DVD cover
- 机のなかみ
- Directed by: Keisuke Yoshida
- Starring: Kōji Abe; Mio Suzuki; Ai Higa; Sō Sakamoto; Natsumi Kiyoura; Yutaka Mishima
- Release date: 2007
- Country: Japan
- Language: Japanese

Tsukue no Nakami (Japanese: 机のなかみ; lit. The Contents of the Desk) is a 2007 Japanese film directed by Keisuke Yoshida.

== Plot ==
The father of Nozomi, a high school student getting ready to take the university entrance exam, hires Baba as a private tutor for Nozomi. The film begins with Baba meeting Nozomi and his father for the first time to talk about Nozomi's academic progress. Nozomi's school of choice is Koyo University. Nozomi lives with his father, who seems to dote on him, and the father warns Baba, "Please be careful not to make any 'odd mistakes'."

While Baba is living with his rough and overbearing girlfriend Misa Tanahashi, he is completely overwhelmed by Nozomi's cuteness and tries to attract her attention in every way. One day, while Baba and Misa are walking down the street together, they meet Nozomi. Baba introduces Misa to Nozomi in a reserved manner, which Misa finds unpleasant.

Nozomi is quiet and doesn't talk much, but sometimes shows a bit flirtatious behavior to Baba. Nozomi asks Baba, "Am I not attractive?" and "Is it wrong to like someone who has a girlfriend?" Baba becomes excited, thinking that Nozomi may have fallen in love with him.

Nozomi's mock exam results are on the rise, and it becomes likely that she will pass the exam for her school of choice. However, she is failed. Baba comforts Nozomi, who is depressed in her room, and lightly kisses her. Since Nozomi doesn't seem to resist, he begins to take off her clothes, but stops midway when he sees Nozomi's tears. However, after that, driven by impulse, Baba takes off Nozomi's panties, but then his father suddenly appears.

The film is interrupted and returns to the opening scene, and then starts to depict Nozomi's school life and interactions with her friends. Nozomi's best friend, Tae Mizuno, and her boyfriend, Rin Fujimaki, are also aiming to enter Koyo University, just like Nozomi. Nozomi seems to like Rin, which makes us think that this is the reason why she is aiming for that school. It turns out that the above questions of Nozomi, such as "Am I unattractive?" and "Is it wrong to like someone who has a girlfriend?", are about Rin. Meanwhile, the relationship between Rin and Tae is getting a little tense. Rin also starts to show signs of liking Nozomi.

Then the secret of Nozomi's family is revealed. Nozomi is taking a bath with his father. One day, after hearing from Tae about her petting with Rin, Nozomi tells his father, "I'll take a bath alone from tomorrow," but is persuaded by his father and withdraws her request.

Nozomi, Rin, and Tae go to see the results of the entrance exams for Koyo University, but Nozomi is the only one who did not pass. That night, Rin and Tae visit Nozomi's house, and Nozomi's father guides them to Nozomi's room. Nozomi's father opens the door to Nozomi's room, which is the scene just before the movie is interrupted.

Nozomi hurriedly gets dressed, but falls, exposing his bare buttocks to her father, Rin, and Tae. His father vents his anger at Baba, while Nozomi gets a heavy nosebleed because of her fall. Her father tries to treat her, but Nozomi stands up and kisses Rin. She then leaves the house and walks through the town crying in her blood-stained school uniform.

The new school year begins, and Rin, a university student, and Nozomi, a student at a prep school, are talking in the park. Rin says that she loves Nozomi, but she can't break up with Tae, and Nozomi begins crying. Meanwhile, Misa also decides to stop living with Baba and move out of the apartment. However, as they part ways, Misa says that she still loves Baba and begins crying, saying that she is sorry. Baba also begins crying and says that he is the one in the wrong for cheating, not Misa. Baba and Misa embrace each other as they cry.

== Cast ==
- Koji Abe as Hajime Baba
- Mio Suzuki as Nozomi Mochizuki
- So Sakamoto as Rin Fujimaki
- Natsumi Kiyoura as Tae Mizuno
- Ari Odoriko as Misa Tanahashi
- Tomoya Naito as Eiichiro Mochizuki (Nozomi's father)
- Yutaka Mishima as Mr Mishima (Nozomi's class teacher)

== Reception ==
Mark Schilling of The Japan Times gave the film a positive review.
