= Just You (TV series) =

2013 Taiwanese television series

- Promotional poster
- 就是要你愛上我
- Genre: Romance, Comedy
- Created by: Sanlih E-Television
- Written by: Yaya Chang 張綺恩; Li Jie Yu 李婕瑀
- Directed by: Ker Choon Hooi 郭春暉
- Starring: Aaron Yan; Puff Kuo
- Opening theme: Beloved (心愛的) by Genie Chuo and Alien Huang
- Ending theme: Unstoppable Sun (擋不住的太陽) by Aaron Yan
- Country of origin: Republic of China (Taiwan)
- Original language: Mandarin
- No. of seasons: 1
- No. of episodes: 21 (original release); 39 (Netflix release)

Production
- Producer: Chen Bi Zhen 陳碧真
- Production location: Taiwan
- Cinematography: Han Ji Xuan 韓紀軒; Lin Yu Tang 林玉堂
- Editors: Wu Ya Jun 吴雅君; Xu Zhi Yi 徐志怡; Chen Bi Zhen 陳碧真
- Running time: 90 minutes
- Production companies: Eastern Shine Production Co., Ltd. 東映製作

Original release
- Network: SETTV
- Release: 21 June – 8 November 2013

Related
- Big Red Riding Hood; In a Good Way

Just You (Chinese: 就是要你愛上我) is a 2013 Taiwanese idol romantic-comedy television series. The television drama was produced by Toei Productions Limited starring Aaron Yan and Puff Kuo as the main leads. It was first aired on June 21, 2013 on Sanlih TV after Big Red Riding Hood and last aired on November 8, 2013. It also inspired the storyline for the Turkish romantic comedy Her Yerde Sen, which aired in 2019.

== Synopsis ==
Qi Yi (Aaron Yan) is a fastidious young man who is afraid of germs and needs to have everything in his life in his own orderly fashion. After he gives up a successful opportunity in New York, he returns to Taiwan and decides to buy a small marketing design company called GAZE, and his old childhood home. The problem is that the home has a peppy tenant, Chen Liang Liang (Puff Kuo), who refuses to move out. When he arrives at his newly acquired company, Qi Yi discovers that Liang Liang also works for his company. The happy-go-lucky Liang Liang just wants everything to be stable in her life, but she realizes that may be harder to maintain when her new boss starts making big changes in her workplace, including a notice stating that office romances will be prohibited. Slowly, Qi Yi starts to fall for Liang Liang, but sudden circumstances make Ding Jia Yu (Qi Yi's ex-girlfriend) come back into Qi Yi's life. Jia Yu plans to ruin things between Qi Yi and Liang Liang. Dean, an outgoing and charming friend of both, helps them solve the problems that arise due to Jia Yu. Dean soon falls for Liang Liang, though he doesn't reveal it and remains a supportive friend to her. The office also has other staff members who later find their life partners within the office. Liang Liang helps Qi Yi and his father find Qi Yi's mother, whom they haven't had contact with for 20 years. For this, and other acts, Qi Yi's dad finds Liang Liang to be a nice person. But Jia Yu is acquainted with Qi Yi's mother. Jia Yu keeps making herself seem like a victim of the choices she's made, causing Qi Yi to feel guilty and sympathize with her. Because Qi Yi wants to make things right, he starts paying more attention to Jia Yu's needs, ignoring Liang Liang and hurting her in the process. Jia Yu makes her friend Jerry cause trouble so she could make Qi Yi fall in love with her again. Jerry ends up kidnapping Liang Liang, and she finds out that Jia Yu and Jerry ran off to the United States after Qi Yi proposed to her. While Jia Yu only goes out of fear of being tied down, Jerry has true feelings for Jia Yu. To try and make her love him, Jerry does everything Jia Yu says. She ends up using him to try and get back with Qi Yi. Liang Liang reveals her true feelings to Qi Yi in front of Jia Yu and the rest of the staff at GAZE. Qi Yi resigns as CEO of GAZE and becomes one of the directors of Hua Lian (a company GAZE is merging with). He promises Liang Liang that he will always stay by her side. Qi Yi's parents end up remarrying in a joint ceremony along with a couple from GAZE. After these events, Liang Liang thinks out loud about why Qi Yi hasn't proposed to her, deciding that if he won't than she will. Unbeknownst to her, Qi Yi is behind her, listening to her ramblings. He emerges and hands her a box. Inside is a ring placed inside a rose.

== Cast ==
=== Main cast ===
- Aaron Yan as Qi Yi
- Puff Kuo as Cheng Liang Liang
- Dean Fujioka as Dean Kamiya
- Lyla Lin as Ding Jia Yu

=== Other Main Cast ===
- Katherine Wang as Kate Liang
- Tang Zhen-Gang as Alex

=== Extended cast ===
- Rim Lin as Ou Lai En
- Lin Yu-pin as Princess
- Zeng Yun Rou as Meimei
- Ke Ya Xin as Shi Cui Xia
- Xie Qi Wen as Li Han Po
- Shen Meng-sheng as Qi Yi's father
- Xie Qiong Nuan as Qi Yi's mother
- Wang Dao An as Cheng Shou An
- Yang Li-yin as Liao Tian Feng
- Sun Peng as Ba Si
- Lin Yo Wei as Da Yan
- Ma Li Ou as Doctor
- Huang Zhen Ni as Nurse
- He Jia Min as GAZE security guard
- Min Xiong as Zhang Tie Xiong
- Wu Zhen Ya as Accounting Manager
- Li Shu Han as Sales Manager
- Chen Bor-jeng as Jiang Hai Bo
- Xu Hao En as Sen
- Tao Chuan Zheng as Mr. Zhao
- Liu Shang Qiang as Mr. Zhang
- Doris Kuang as Secretary Chen
- Chang Han as Jerry

== Soundtrack ==
Just You Original TV Soundtrack (OST)

Soundtrack album by Various artists
- Released: 21 March 2014
- Genre: Mandopop
- Language: Mandarin
- Label: Rock Records Co., Ltd. 滾石國際音樂股份有限公司

Just You Original TV Soundtrack (OST) (就是要你愛上我 電視原聲帶) was released on March 21, 2014 by various artists under Rock Records Co., Ltd. label. It contains 13 tracks total. The opening theme is track 1 "Beloved (心愛的)" by Genie Chuo and Alien Huang. The closing theme song is "Unstoppable Sun (擋不住的太陽)" by Aaron Yan which is not featured in the soundtrack album since Yan is signed artiste to HIM records.

=== Track listing ===
No.	Title	Singer(s)	Length
1.	"Beloved" (心愛的)	Genie Chuo 卓文萱 and Alien Huang 黃鴻升	3:37
2.	"Don't Fall In Love At The Office!" (別在辦公室談戀愛！)	Instrumental	3:01
3.	"Our Half Spoken Story" (我們的故事只講了一半)	Freya Lim 林凡	4:13
4.	"No Matter How Tangled, There Is A Warm Home" (再怎麼糾纏，還是有家的溫暖)	Instrumental	3:01
5.	"One Thousandth Of A Percent" (千分之一)	Alien Huang 黃鴻升	3:32
6.	"Exclusive Expression Of Love" (專屬的戀愛表情)	Instrumental	3:09
7.	"Village Cat" (村上的貓)	Alien Huang 黃鴻升	3:51
8.	"I'm Not Your toilet!" (我不是你的馬桶！)	Instrumental	2:58
9.	"Love, Do Not Fade, Okay?" (愛，不要凋謝好嗎？)	Instrumental	3:07
10.	"Hugely Fortunate" (大確幸)	Alien Huang 黃鴻升	2:40
11.	"Not A Cute Cat" (不可愛的貓)	Instrumental	3:22
12.	"Do You Want To Throw Me Away?" (要把我丟掉嗎？)	Instrumental	3:18
13.	"You Will Be My Love" (你會變成我的愛)	Instrumental	2:59

== Publications ==
*August 2, 2014: S-Pop Vol. 8 August 2013 (華流 8月號/2013) - barcode 4717095573604 Sanlih E-Television 三立電視 - Author: Sanlih E-Television 三立電視監製

The main leads Aaron Yan and Puff Kuo are featured on the cover of S-Pop August 2013 regular edition of the magazine.

== Episode ratings ==
Competing dramas on rival channels airing at the same time slot were:
- TTV - Happy 300 Days, A Good Wife, The Pursuit of Happiness
- SET - Flavor of Life, White Magnolia
- FTV - Independent Heroes
- CTV - True Love 365, Dragon Gate

Air Date	Episode	Average Ratings	Rank
June 21, 2013	1	1.15	2
June 28, 2013	2	1.16	2
July 5, 2013	3	0.79	3
July 12, 2013	4	0.71	3
July 19, 2013	5	0.78	3
July 26, 2013	6	1.07	3
August 2, 2013	7	1.20	3
August 9, 2013	8	1.26	2
August 16, 2013	9	1.50	3
August 23, 2013	10	1.65	2
August 30, 2013	11	1.67	2
September 6, 2013	12	1.44	3
September 13, 2013	13	1.12	4
September 20, 2013	14	1.85	1
September 27, 2013	15	1.36	3
October 4, 2013	16	1.54	3
October 11, 2013	17	1.58	3
October 18, 2013	18	1.48	3
October 25, 2013	19	1.49	2
November 1, 2013	20	1.48	3
November 8, 2013	21	1.68	2
Average ratings		1.33	

== Awards and nominations ==
The 2013 Sanlih Drama Awards Ceremony were held on December 28, 2013 at Sanlih's headquarters and broadcasting studios at No. 159, Section 1, Jiuzong Rd, Neihu District Taipei City, Taiwan.

Year	Ceremony	Category	Nominee	Result
2013	2013 Sanlih Drama Awards 華劇大賞	Best Actor Award	Aaron Yan	Nominated
2013	2013 Sanlih Drama Awards 華劇大賞	Best Actress Award	Puff Kuo	Nominated
2013	2013 Sanlih Drama Awards 華劇大賞	Best Screen Couple Award	Aaron Yan & Puff Kuo	Won
2013	2013 Sanlih Drama Awards 華劇大賞	Best Kiss Award	Aaron Yan & Puff Kuo	Nominated
2013	2013 Sanlih Drama Awards 華劇大賞	Best Crying Award	Aaron Yan & Puff Kuo	Nominated
2013	2013 Sanlih Drama Awards 華劇大賞	Best Lady Killer Award	Shen Meng-Sheng	Won
2013	2013 Sanlih Drama Awards 華劇大賞	Best Foolishly Award	Yang Li-Yin	Nominated
2013	2013 Sanlih Drama Awards 華劇大賞	Most Popular Overseas Award	Aaron Yan	Nominated
2013	2013 Sanlih Drama Awards 華劇大賞	Most Popular Overseas Award	Puff Kuo	Nominated
2013	2013 Sanlih Drama Awards 華劇大賞	Weibo Popularity Award	Aaron Yan	Won
2013	2013 Sanlih Drama Awards 華劇大賞	Weibo Popularity Award	Puff Kuo	Nominated
2013	2013 Sanlih Drama Awards 華劇大賞	Viewers Choice Drama Award	Just You	Won
