= First Love (2019 film) =

2019 film

- Theatrical release poster

Japanese name
- Kanji: 初恋
Transcriptions
- Revised Hepburn: Hatsukoi
- Directed by: Takashi Miike
- Screenplay by: Masaru Nakamura
- Story by: Muneyuki Kii
- Produced by: Muneyuki Kii; Jeremy Thomas; Misako Saka
- Starring: Masataka Kubota; Nao Omori; Shota Sometani; Sakurako Konishi; Becky; Takahiro Miura; Mami Fujioka; Yen Cheng-kuo; Duan Chun-hao; Maimi Yajima; Masayuki Deai; Jun Murakami; Kenichi Takitoh; Bengal; Sansei Shiomi; Seiyo Uchino
- Cinematography: Nobuyashu Kita
- Edited by: Akira Kamiya
- Music by: Koji Endo
- Production company: OLM
- Distributed by: Toei Company, Ltd.
- Release dates: 17 May 2019 (Cannes); 28 February 2020 (Japan)
- Running time: 108 minutes
- Country: Japan
- Language: Japanese
- Box office: $366,247

First Love (Japanese: 初恋, Hepburn: Hatsukoi) is a 2019 crime thriller film directed by Takashi Miike. It tells the story of a boxer and a call girl who become unwittingly involved in a drug-smuggling scheme. The film premiered on 17 May 2019 in Directors' Fortnight, before being released in theatres in the United Kingdom and Japan in February 2020.

== Plot ==
Leo, an up-and-coming boxer, works at a Chinese restaurant in Kabukichō, Tokyo as his day job. After taking a surprise punch and collapsing during a match, he is told by a doctor that he has an inoperable brain tumour and does not have long to live. Meanwhile, drug-addicted call girl Yuri is trying to pay off her father's debts. She is trapped by yakuza member Yasu and his girlfriend Julie in an apartment, which is used as one of the yakuza's drug-dealing hubs.

In the same district of Tokyo, yakuza member Kase and corrupt cop Ōtomo plan a drug-smuggling scheme: they plan to steal drugs from Yasu and Julie, then blame it on Yuri, hoping her drug habit will be enough to convince the rest of the yakuza. Ōtomo orders Yuri's services as an excuse to get Yuri out of the apartment, but Yuri sees a hallucination of her father and makes a break for it; as she does, she crosses paths with a depressed Leo on the street. Leo hits Ōtomo in the face and decides to help Yuri, figuring he has nothing to lose as he believes he's going to die of his brain tumour. As they run through the city, Leo helps Yuri come to terms with her trauma and her addictions.

Meanwhile, Kase has a Chinese triad man abduct Julie to keep her out of the apartment. Kase goes to the apartment and steals the drugs, but Yasu gets the drop on him, causing Kase to shoot him dead. Julie furiously kills the triad man and goes back to the apartment, finding Yasu murdered. She notifies the yakuza in her grief, who assume that the Chinese triad stole the drugs and abducted Yuri. Yakuza boss Gondō goes out with his colleagues to find Yuri. Around the same time, Chiachi, another Chinese triad member, and her colleagues are also sent to find Yuri, who they believe killed one of their men.

Kase and Ōtomo find and capture Leo and Yuri after Leo kills an attacking yakuza member, but the four are attacked by both the yakuza and the Chinese triad. After crashing their car, Leo and Yuri escape into a hardware store, where Leo learns that due to a mix-up at the doctor's office, his MRI was switched with a different patient's and he has no tumour. Realizing he can be strong even when he's not about to die, Leo resolves to get Yuri out alive. When the triad and yakuza converge on the store, a series of gunfights and sword fights occur, resulting in the deaths of Kase, Julie, and several other yakuza and triad members. When the police arrive and Ōtomo tries to flash his badge, he's shot by Chiachi, who he shoots, causing the police to gun them both down. With help from Gondō, Leo and Yuri escape from the store by crashing Gondō's car through the upstairs parking garage and jumping over the blockade of police.

Gondō lets Leo and Yuri go free, leading the police on a chase and seemingly succumbing to the wounds he received in the hardware store. Some time later, Leo continues to pursue his career as a boxer and Yuri finally overcomes her drug addiction in a rehabilitation center. The film ends as Leo and Yuri, now a couple, enter an apartment together on a snowy day.

== Cast ==
- Masataka Kubota as Leo Katsuragi
- Nao Omori as Ōtomo
- Shota Sometani as Kase
- Sakurako Konishi as Yuri/Monica
- Becky as Julie
- Takahiro Miura as Yasu
- Mami Fujioka as Chiachi
- Yen Cheng-kuo as Wang
- Duan Chun-hao as Fu
- Maimi Yajima as Miyuki
- Masayuki Deai as Jōjima
- Jun Murakami as Ichikawa
- Kenichi Takitoh as Doctor
- Bengal as Fortune teller
- Sansei Shiomi as Deputy boss
- Seiyo Uchino as Gondō

== Release ==
The film had its world premiere in the Directors' Fortnight section at the 2019 Cannes Film Festival on 17 May 2019. It was also screened at the Toronto International Film Festival, Busan International Film Festival, BFI London Film Festival, and Fantastic Fest.

The film was first released in cinemas in the United States and Canada (several months before it was released in its country of origin), on 27 September 2019, distributed by Well Go USA Entertainment.

It was released in cinemas in the United Kingdom and Ireland on 14 February 2020, distributed by Signature Entertainment, and in Japan two weeks later, on 28 February 2020, distributed by Toei.

== Reception ==
On review aggregator website Rotten Tomatoes, the film holds an approval rating of 97% based on 118 reviews, and an average rating of 7.5/10. The website's critical consensus reads, "First Love's blend of violence, comedy, and romance might seem disparate -- but for director Takashi Miike, it's just another wildly entertaining entry in a filmography full of them." On Metacritic, the film has a weighted average score of 77 out of 100, based on 24 critics, indicating "generally favorable reviews".

Mike D Angelo of The A.V. Club gave the film a grade of B+, writing, "First Love ranks among Miike's most purely entertaining movies (out of more than 100 now!), gradually building steam until it reaches a sustained pitch of cheerful insanity." Stephen Dalton of The Hollywood Reporter commented that "the Tarantino-style rollercoaster ride is as effortlessly enjoyable as ever, accentuating the director's lighter comic leanings over his bloodthirsty side." David Ehrlich of IndieWire praised Shota Sometani's performance, stating, "Sometani is particularly brilliant as the yakuza screw-up who never misses a chance to scratch off one of his enemies and climb a rung on the ladder, even if he seems to sink lower with every decision he makes."
