= Sakurako Konishi =

Japanese actress

- 小西 桜子
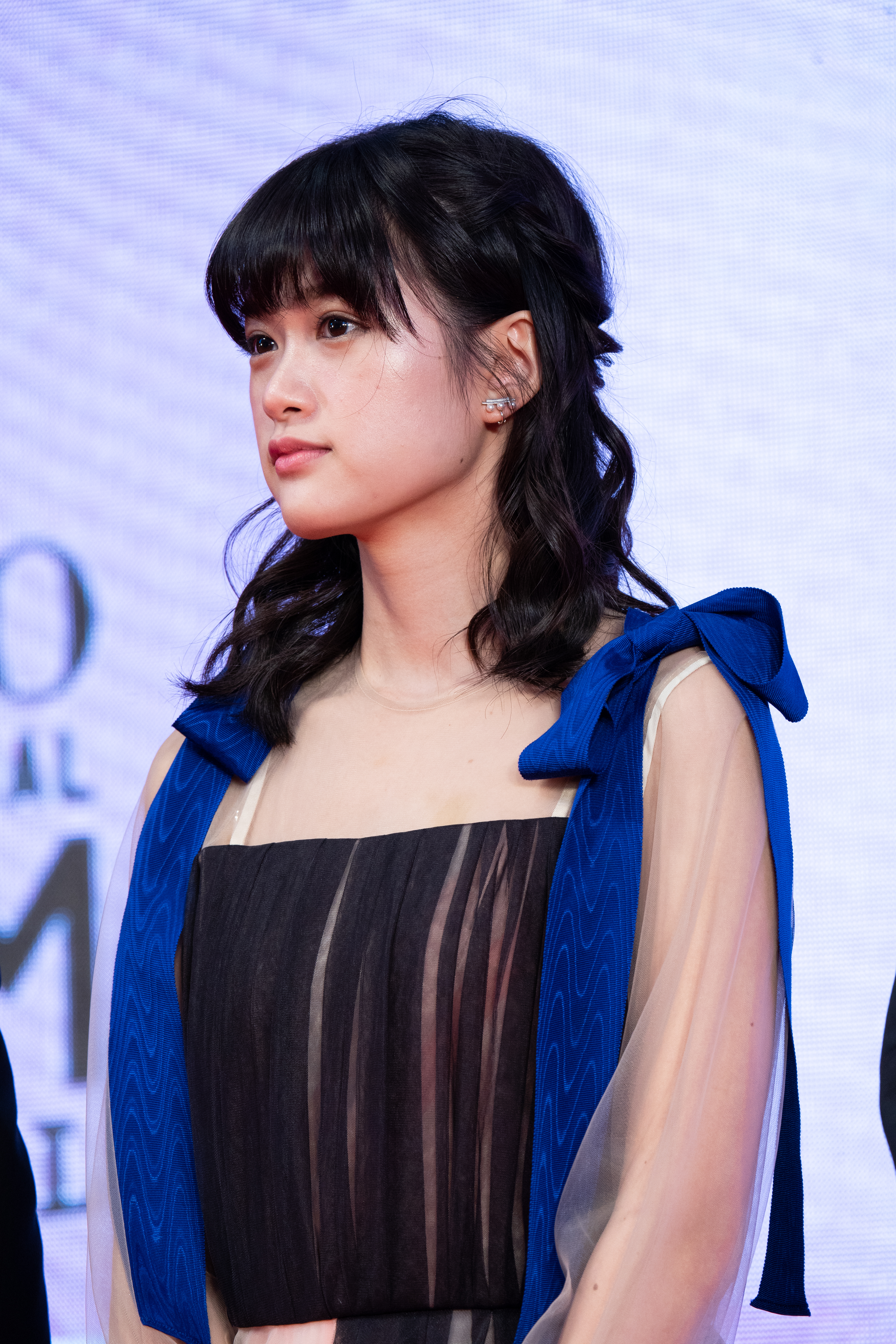
- Konshi in 2019
- Born: 29 March 1998 (age 28); Saitama, Japan
- Occupation: Actress
- Years active: 2017–present

Sakurako Konishi (小西 桜子 Konishi Sakurako) (born March 29, 1998) is a Japanese actress from Saitama.

== Career ==
Konishi first became interested in an acting career after watching Sion Sono's film Himizu in junior high school. She subsequently appeared in a self-produced film at university, and began to send her resume to entertainment agencies and attended auditions. After meeting film director Masaoki Hirota, she was cast as the heroine in his 2020 film Fancy, which became her first commercial film appearance. She was also cast as the heroine in Takashi Miike's First Love, being chosen out of 3,000 applicants in auditions in 2019. She also appeared on the cover and the opening gravure of the manga magazine Young King, for the March 2, 2020 issue, published by Shōnen Gahōsha.

Konishi has stated that she is not affiliated with an entertainment agency, choosing instead to "prioritize the approaches she wants to develop in her work." She does however have a manager. In 2020 she won the 42nd Yokohama Film Festival's Best Newcomer Award for her work in First Love, Fancy, and Sasaki In My Mind. She was also nominated for the 14th Asian Film Awards Award for Best Newcomer that year.

== Filmography ==
=== Film ===
Year	Title	Role	Notes	Ref.
2019	First Love	Monica/Yuri		
2020	Fancy	"Moonlit Night's Star"		
2020	Keep Your Hands Off Eizouken!	Toru Dotonbori		
2020	The Samejima Incident	Fumi Nakase		
2020	Sasaki In My Mind	Ichinose		
2021	Between Us	Misuzu Saeki		
2021	Colorless	Hisako		
2023	Spring in Between	Haru Komukai		
2024	In Your Own Words	Rie Suzuki		
2026	The Girl at the End of the Line			
2026	2126, Looking for the Sea's Star			

=== Television drama ===
Year	Title	Role	Notes	Ref.
2020	On Nights When I Want To End It All...	Okada	Episodes 2 and 3	
2020	Keep Your Hands Off Eizouken!	Toru Dotonbori		
2020	Furo Girl!	Aino Hiyama		
2020	Cat	Mineko Kaneko	Lead role	
2021	Keihan Story: Old Folk House Vacation Rental Bond Shop	Imachi Jun	Lead role	
2021	The Romance Manga Artist	Yuna Ito		
2021	Love Phantom	Momoko Hirasawa		
2022	Short Program	Keiko Komiya	Lead role; Ep. 11	
2023	Burn the House Down	Nanami Katsuragi		

== Stage performance ==
Year	Title	Role	Location	Notes	Ref.
2019	365 days, 36.5 °C	Chaoyang	Sumida Park - Studio Kura	30 October - November 4, 2019	

== Music video ==
Year	Artist	Song	Date	Ref.
2018	ayU tokiO	"Asagao"	June 15, 2018	
2019	Maruritoryuga	"Wake janai"	August 24, 2019	
2020	Regal Lily	"Hanshī"	February 5, 2020	
