= Koji Abe =

Japanese comedian, comic chat artist, actor and lyricist

- あべ こうじ
- Born: Koji Abe (阿部 公二); 19 February 1975 (age 51); Yokohama, Kanagawa Prefecture
- Occupations: Comedian; actor; lyricist
- Years active: 1997–
- Agent: Yoshimoto Creative Agency
- Notable work: Koji Abe no Podcast Banchō
- Style: Mandan
- Television: Current; Yume wa koko kara Namahōsō: Happy; Former; Shōjo B; Happy Music
- Height: 178 cm (5 ft 10 in)
- Spouse: Ai Takahashi (m. 2014)
- Partner: Kazuyuki Sakuma (Abesaku)
- Website: Official website

Koji Abe (あべ こうじ, Abe Kōji; born 19 February 1975, in Minami-ku, Yokohama, Kanagawa Prefecture) is a Japanese comedian (pin entertainer), comic chat artist, actor and lyricist. His wife is former Morning Musume member and tarento Ai Takahashi.

Abe is represented with Yoshimoto Kogyo in Tokyo (Tokyo Yoshimoto, a subsidiary of Yoshimoto Creative Agency).

== Programme appearances ==
Year	Title	Network	Ref.
2006	Koji Abe no Podcast Banchō	TBS Radio	
	Dai Shōten	NTV	
	Bakushō Red Carpet	Fuji TV	
	Enta no Kamisama	NTV	
	Owarai Dynamite!	TBS	
2007	Kuchikomi Johnny	NTV	
	Yoshimoto Mugendai	Yoshimoto Fandango TV	
2008	Gold Rush 2008 –Kotoshi koso Break shitai Geinin ga Hiraku Atarashiki Iromonea no Yoake!!	TBS	
2008	MS Young Town Doyōbi	MBS Radio	
2008	Tensai TV-kun Max	NHK-E	
2009	Shinshun Golden Pink Carpet SP	Fuji TV	
2009	Hitoshi Matsumoto no Marumaru na Hanashi	Fuji TV	
	Happy Music	NTV	
	Futtonda	CTV	
2010	U-La-La@7	Tokyo MX	
2010	Dai Kaizō!! Gekiteki Before After	ABC	
2011	Yamagata Hatsu! Tabi no Kenmonroku	TV Saitama, YBC	
2012	wktk Radio Gakuen	NHK Radio 1	
2012	HKT48 no Baby Radio	FM Fukuoka	
2013	Pon!	NTV	
2013	Yume wa koko kara Namahōsō: Happy	ABA	
2015	Yume wa koko kara Shinya Hōsō: Lucky	ABA	

== Films ==
Year	Title	Role
2006	Tsukue no Nakami	Moto Baba
2007	Hero	
2007	Switch	
2008	my	Moto Baba
2011	Yuki no Naka no shiro Usagi	
2024	Zagin de Shisu!?	

== Television dramas ==
Year	Title	Role	Network
1997	Ultraman Tiga		TBS
2011	Yūsha Yoshihiko to Maō no Shiro	Burglar	TV Tokyo
2013	Amachan		NHK
2022	Short Program	Shopkeeper	Amazon Prime Video
2022	Kamen Rider Geats	Morio Koganeya/Kamen Rider Mary	TV Asahi

== Stage ==
Year	Title
	Abesaku Talk
Pinspo'
The Momo-Taro
Boku o Wasurete
Hinode Apart no Seishun
2011	Rosencrantz and Guildenstern Are Dead

== Songwriting ==
- Nander Max

Year	Title
2009	"Saāikō"

== Videography ==
Year	Title
1997	Yuzu "Chikagai"

== In-store broadcasts ==
Year	Title	Network	Ref.
2014	Fami Yoshi "Egao no Takkyūbin	FamilyMart Store Broadcast	
