= The Next Me (EP) =

- The Next Me cover

EP 下一個炎亞綸 by Aaron Yan
- Released: 25 March 2011
- Genre: Mandopop
- Length: 24:21
- Language: Mandarin
- Label: HIM International Music; Pony Canyon (Japan)

Aaron Yan chronology
| The Next Me (2011) | The Moment 紀念日 (2012) |

The Next Me (Chinese: 下一個炎亞綸; pinyin: xià yī gè yán yà lún; lit. 'The Next Aaron Yan') is the debut Mandarin solo EP by Aaron Yan of Taiwanese Mandopop quartet boy band Fahrenheit. It was released by HIM International Music on 25 March 2011 with pre-orders available from 11 March 2011. The Japanese edition was released on 15 June 2011 by Pony Canyon, which included the Japanese version of title track "下一個我" (The Next Me).

The EP consists of five songs and one instrumental track performed by Yan. The track "只看見妳" (I Can See Nothing But You) was composed by label mate singer-songwriter Tank, it also features a duet, "最後一眼" (Just One Look) with Singaporean songstress Olivia Ong.

The album is the third best selling album in Taiwan in 2011, with 68,000 copies sold.

== Track listing ==
| No. | Title | Lyrics | Music | Translation | Length |
|---|---|---|---|---|---|
| 1. | "下一個我" (Xia Yi Ge Wo) | Chen Xinyan | Rao Shanjiang | The Next Me | 4:41 |
| 2. | "只看見妳" (Zhi Kan Jian Ni) | Yaoruo Long | Tank | I Can See Nothing But You | 4:12 |
| 3. | "一觸即發" (Yi Chu Ji Fa) | Huang Jianzhou | Yang Zi Pu, Xu Zhou | Touch and Go | 4:02 |
| 4. | "最後一眼" (Zui Hou Yi Yan feat Olivia Ong) | Yaoruo Long | Chiharu Tamaki | Just One Look | 3:40 |
| 5. | "忽然之間" (Hu Ran Zhi Jian) | Zhouyao Hui, Li Cheuk-hung | Lin Jianhua | Suddenly | 3:55 |
| 6. | "The Truth That You Leave" (Piano instrumental) | | Gao Zhi Hao | | 3:51 |

Japanese Edition
| No. | Title | Length |
|---|---|---|
| 1. | "The Next Me" (下一個我 Japanese version) | 4:41 |
| 2. | "The Next Me" (下一個我) | 4:41 |
| 3. | "I Can See Nothing But You" (只看見妳) | 4:12 |
| 4. | "Touch and Go" (一觸即發) | 4:02 |
| 5. | "Just One Look" (最後一眼 feat Olivia Ong) | 3:40 |
| 6. | "Suddenly" (忽然之間) | 3:55 |
| 7. | "The Truth That You Leave" (Piano instrumental) | 3:51 |

== Music videos ==
- "下一個我" (The Next Me) MV
- "只看見妳" (I Can See Nothing But You) MV
- "最後一眼" (Just One Look) MV
