= Short Program (TV series) =

2022 Japanese television series

- Promotional image of Short Program
- Kanji: ショート・プログラム
- Genre: Teen drama; Romance; Slice of life
- Based on: Short Program by Mitsuru Adachi
- Screenplay by: Yusuke Moriguchi; Ryohei Watanabe; Naho Kamimura; Yu Asahina; Masahiko Shirakawa; Minami Nakai; Sachio Yanai; Takeo Kikuchi; Takashi Masuyama; Masahiro Yamaura
- Directed by: Ryohei Watanabe; Naho Kamimura; Tetsuhiko Tsuchiya; Takeo Kikuchi; Takashi Masuyama; Takeshi Moriya
- Starring: JO1; Natsumi Okamoto; Sayu Kubota; Honoka Yahagi; Asuka Kijima; Nashiko Momotsuki; Shiori Akita; Fumika Baba; Yurina Yanagi; Sara Ogawa; Riko; Sakurako Konishi; Marika Itō
- Theme music composer: Yoshitaka Fujimoto
- Ending theme: "Dreamer" by JO1
- Composers: Yoshitaka Fujimoto; Shizuka Tokuda; Katō Kenji; Hidekazu Sakamoto; Yasuhisa Inoue
- Country of origin: Japan
- Original language: Japanese
- No. of seasons: 1
- No. of episodes: 12

Production
- Executive producers: Choi Shin-hwa; Jang Hyeok-jin; Shū Kamigaso
- Producers: Yusuke Kitahashi; Takeshi Moriya; Ayano Saiki
- Running time: 26-39 minutes per episode
- Production companies: Atmovie Inc.; Lapone Entertainment

Original release
- Network: Amazon Prime Video
- Release: 1 March – 14 March 2022

Short Program (Japanese: ショート・プログラム, Hepburn: Shōto Puroguramu) is a 2022 Japanese anthology streaming television drama series based on Mitsuru Adachi's manga collection with the same name starring members of boy band JO1 as the male protagonists. The series is produced by Atmovie Inc. and Lapone Entertainment, with Yoshimoto Kogyo as the distributor. It was premiered on Amazon Prime Video in Japan on March 1, 2022. "Dreamer" by JO1 served as the ending theme for the series.

== Premise ==
Short Program follows eleven members of boy band JO1 alternately playing the male protagonist in each episode, based on the short stories on youth and romance from Mitsuru Adachi's manga collection with the same name. Each story centers on different theme or activity, such as sports, music, or detective story. The series concluded with an original story written by Yusuke Moriguchi, featuring all male protagonists from the previous episodes.

== Cast and characters ==
=== Main ===
JO1

- Takumi Kawanishi as Ichirō Imai
- Shion Tsurubo as Kenji Uehara
- Shosei Ohira as Kōhei Shinjō
- Ren Kawashiri as Kazuhiko Sugii
- Sho Yonashiro as Haruhiko Takechi
- Sukai Kinjo as Misaki Tadokoro
- Syoya Kimata as Keiichi Kataoka
- Keigo Sato as Shōhei Tahara
- Ruki Shiroiwa as Seiya Toda
- Issei Mamehara as Hajime Toshino
- Junki Kono as Wataru Matsumura

Female protagonists

- Natsumi Okamoto as Chisato Ichinose
- Sayu Kubota as Tomomi Sakamoto
- Honoka Yahagi as Nao Tanimura
- Asuka Kijima as Asako Takazawa
- Nashiko Momotsuki as Misato Yamane
- Shiori Akita as Wakaba Moriyama
- Fumika Baba as Michiko
- Yurina Yanagi as Naomi Morimura
- Sara Ogawa as Satomi Nishijima
- Riko as Manami Nonomura
- Sakurako Konishi as Keiko Komiya
- Marika Itō as Miho

=== Supporting ===
- Raiku as Sugimoto
- Itsuji Itao as Ichirō's father
- Takurō Osada as Haruki Kitayama
- Wan Marui as Sayaka
- Junya Ikeda as Tomio Akahori
- Yumecchi as waitress. She accompanied Kōhei finishing his script.
- Koji Abe as shopkeeper. He received posters from Kōhei and Nao.
- Nachi Sakuragi as Toshio Higashi
- Ryōka Neya as Hinata, Kazuhiko's girlfriend
- Shunya Itabashi as Mr. Yamane, Misato's older brother
- Reiya Masaki as Katsuaki Sugiyama
- Ami Tomite as Yuki
- Masanobu Katsumura as Detective Moriyama
- Noboru Kaneko as Mr. Komiyama, Wakaba's boss
- Shōno Hayama as Shin
- Ami Inoha as Akane
- Yôta Kawase as Mr. Ōba, Seiya and Ken's boss
- Miyuu Teshima as Haruko Tsuyama
- Kuu Izima as Ken Takasugi
- Katsuya as Mr. Tanabe, lodge owner
- Louis Kurihara as an actor, who claims to be an alien.
- Tomoki Hirose as Kakimoto, who claims to be a YouTuber.
- Ikkei Watanabe as a detective
- Mariko Tsutsui as Mayumi, Keiko's aunt and boss
- Oideyasu Oda as a police
- Ryota Sakai as a beach house visitor
- Zen Kajihara as the CEO of Project 101

== Episodes ==
No.	Title	Directed by	Written by	Music by	Original release date
1	"Plus 1"; Transliteration: "Purasu Wan" (Japanese: プラス1)	Ryohei Watanabe	Yusuke Moriguchi	Yoshitaka Fujimoto	March 1, 2022
Helping his injured father handle their family's electrical shop, Ichirō Imai is fixing an old stereo at the home of his classmate, Chisato Ichinose. Despite being mocked as someone who "always lacks something", Chisato still gravitates towards Ichirō after finding they share the same interests. Meanwhile, Sugimoto, Ichirō's former bandmate and a womanizer, is interested in Chisato and trying to get closer to her in his way. Cast : Takumi Kawanishi, Natsumi Okamoto, Raiku, Itsuji Itao
2	"Spring Passes"; Transliteration: "Yuku Haru" (Japanese: ゆく春)	Ryohei Watanabe	Ryohei Watanabe	Yoshitaka Fujimoto	March 1, 2022
Kenji Uehara has come to watch a match of his alma mater's rugby team with his girlfriend Sayaka when he notices Tomomi Sakamoto watching alone on the bleachers. While the rugby team is struggling in the field, Kenji and Tomomi are reminiscing the team's late star player and Kenji's best friend, Haruki Kitayama. Haruki, who had a crush on Tomomi, found Kenji also liked her, but they decided to compete on who would pursue her. Back in the present, Tomomi thanks Kenji for the lie he told during Haruki's passing despite always being a frank person. Cast : Shion Tsurubo, Sayu Kubota, Takurō Osada, Wan Marui
3	"Spring Call"; Transliteration: "Supuringu Kōru" (Japanese: スプリング・コール)	Naho Kamimura	Naho Kamimura	Shizuka Tokuda	March 1, 2022
One month until their next performance, the members of the university's theater club feel unsatisfied with the current script written by their leader Tomio Akahori. Nao Tanimura encourages Kōhei Shinjō to write his own script, which he later titles Spring Call. However, Kōhei lets Tomio keep belittling his work. Watching Nao's frustration over his inaction and knowing Tomio's cunning intention behind his script, Kōhei eventually can no longer suppress his true feelings. Cast : Shosei Ohira, Honoka Yahagi, Junya Ikeda, Yumecchi, Koji Abe
4	"The Current State of Affairs"; Transliteration: "Kinkyō" (Japanese: 近況)	Naho Kamimura	Naho Kamimura	Katō Kenji	March 4, 2022
Kazuhiko Sugii, an apprentice stylist, attends his class reunion where he meets Asako Takazawa, a kindergarten teacher, and the popular Toshio Higashi. The tension between Asako and Toshio is apparent. During high school, Kazuhiko bonded with Asako over their love for sewing, but when he accidentally picked up a love letter from Toshio for her, Kazuhiko gave his blessing for the couple. In the present, drunk Toshio airs out all of his complaints when he was still dating Asako to Kazuhiko, causing them to engage in an altercation. After finding out what happened to the muffler he helped Asako knit, it dawns on Kazuhiko how clueless he was about the three of them back in school. Cast : Ren Kawashiri, Asuka Kijima, Nachi Sakuragi, Ryōka Neya
5	"At the Intersection"; Transliteration: "Kōsaten Mae" (Japanese: 交差点前)	Ryohei Watanabe	Yusuke Moriguchi	Katō Kenji	March 4, 2022
Every Tuesday at 14:45, Haruhiko Takechi always goes to the same intersection only to pass by the woman he has a crush on. Despite the encouragement from his co-worker Katsuaki to talk to her, Haruhiko is too fixated on his wild imaginations about their potential future. One day, a misunderstanding occurs when he's visiting a nearby coffee shop with Katsuaki and his girlfriend Yuki, resulting in the woman never passing the intersection again. But this bad luck may ultimately not be a bad thing. Cast : Sho Yonashiro, Nashiko Momotsuki, Shunya Itabashi, Reiya Masaki, Ami Tomite
6	"Subject - Wakaba"; Transliteration: "Wakaba Māku" (Japanese: 若葉マーク)	Tetsuhiko Tsuchiya	Yu Asahina & Masahiko Shirakawa	Hidekazu Sakamoto	March 4, 2022
Detective Moriyama assigns his assistant Misaki Tadokoro to investigate the girl whom the client's son has fallen in love with at first sight. Upon seeing her photo, Misaki is surprised the girl is none other than Moriyama's daughter, Wakaba, whom he saved from a stalker half a year ago. During his investigation, Misaki finds out she's involved with a married man, which he later presents to his boss as a ruse to scare off the unwanted suitor instead. Unbeknownst to everyone, Wakaba's secret is not as it seems. Cast : Sukai Kinjo, Shiori Akita, Masanobu Katsumura, Noboru Kaneko
7	"Blowing Any Which Way"; Transliteration: "Doko Fuku Kaze" (Japanese: どこ吹く風)	Ryohei Watanabe	Minami Nakai	Yoshitaka Fujimoto	March 6, 2022
Aspiring hairstylist Shōhei Tahara temporarily lives with Shin, who came from Tokyo to avoid his family's home. Shōhei has been interested in their high school friend Michiko but could only watch over her as she gets along better with Shin. One day, Shin and Michiko plan a birthday party for Shōhei. After finding out Shin will pick up Akane, who has come from Tokyo to join them, Shōhei tells Michiko the party has been canceled. He is annoyed about how careless Shin is with Michiko's feelings. However, a slip-up by Akane clues him in on how Michiko truly feels. Cast : Keigo Sato, Fumika Baba, Shōno Hayama, Ami Inoha
8	"Short Program"; Transliteration: "Shōto Puroguramu" (Japanese: ショート・プログラム)	Takeo Kikuchi	Sachio Yanai & Takeo Kikuchi	Hidekazu Sakamoto	March 6, 2022
Just after arriving at his apartment from work, Seiya Toda notices his obsessive ex-girlfriend Haruko Tsuyama in his room. As he is trying to fend off Haruko, who is wielding a kitchen knife, a sandal hits his windowpane, giving him a chance to seize the knife. Looking out the window, the sandal thrower turns out to be Naomi Morimura, a woman living in the apartment across the street. The two gradually get closer as Seiya is receiving random things at his apartment and feels someone has been stalking him. His fellow part-timer Takasugi and their boss Mr. Oba encourage him to confess his feelings for Naomi, but they later point out how it's such a coincidence she managed to help him at the right time that night. It dawns on Seiya that she has done it too many times. Cast : Ruki Shiroiwa, Yurina Yanagi, Yōta Kawase, Miyuu Teshima, Ku Ijima
9	"What's Going On!?"; Transliteration: "Nani ga Nanda ka" (Japanese: なにがなんだか)	Takashi Masuyama	Takashi Masuyama	Yasuhisa Inoue	March 6, 2022
Keiichi Kataoka, an office worker from Tokyo, is on his way to a mountain lodge to meet his pen pal for three years Satomi Nishijima, who mentioned she would stay there in her last letter. Because he doesn't know whether it's her real name and her face, he decides to check in with a fake name. However, things take an unexpected turn when one of the lodgers introduces himself as an alien and others follow him by introducing themselves with a fake identity. Watching how everyone has turned the vacation into a masquerade game as a means of escapism from their reality, frustrated Keiichi impulsively confronts them. Cast : Syoya Kimata, Sara Ogawa, Katsuya, Louis Kurihara, Tomoki Hirose
10	"Memory Off"; Transliteration: "Memorī Ofu" (Japanese: メモリーオフ)	Ryohei Watanabe	Masahiro Yamaura & Ryohei Watanabe	Shizuka Tokuda	March 9, 2022
This New Year, Hajime Toshino is unable to go on a vacation to Hawaii with his family because he is busy studying after taking a gap year. Late at night, the intercom at his house rings and he sees a strange girl through the front door monitor who keeps asking where and who she is. Relenting to her insistence, he opens the door to see a gun pointed at him instead. A stun gun and a knife are also found on her person, but she doesn't remember anything. Relying on the Proust Effect, Hajime has the girl smells various stimuli to evoke her memories, which leads them to sneak into a botanical garden. However, it's Hajime who recalls a memory when he accidentally smells her. In another part of his neighborhood, a detective is investigating a murder of a middle-aged man who is dead from a shot to his head. The murder weapon is nowhere to be found. Cast : Issei Mamehara, Riko, Ikkei Watanabe, Ruki Shiroiwa
11	"A Stop on The Way"; Transliteration: "Tochū Gesha" (Japanese: 途中下車)	Ryohei Watanabe	Masahiro Yamaura & Ryohei Watanabe	Yoshitaka Fujimoto	March 9, 2022
As a game punishment from his friends, Wataru Matsumura is off to see his first love Asami Sakura, who has saved his life in junior high school. He gets on a bus bound for Higashi Sanbonmatsu, where she supposedly lives. But when he wakes up from his sleep near the stop for Kimihama, he notices his bag is missing and has no option but to get off. As he is looking around the beach area, Wataru, who has been getting bad luck since he was small, accidentally breaks a signboard at a beach house. The owner Mayumi happens to be the aunt of his junior high school classmate Keiko Komiya and allows Wataru to work for her to compensate for the damage. Bad luck continues befalling him as he's staying there to work. When he finally has the money to continue his journey, Wataru happens to meet another former classmate on the bus, and subsequently manages to turn all his bad luck into good luck. Cast : Junki Kono, Sakurako Konishi, Mariko Tsutsui, Oideyasu Oda, Ryota Sakai, Takumi Kawanishi
12	"Dreamer"; Transliteration: "Dorīmā" (Japanese: ドリーム)	Takeshi Moriya	Yusuke Moriguchi	Katō Kenji	March 14, 2022
Following their decision to pursue their forgotten dream in the previous episodes, Hajime Toshino, Kenji Uehara, Ichiro Imai, Keiichi Kataoka, Kohei Shinjo, Haruhiko Takechi, Shohei Tahara, Toda Seiya are in the last group to audition for Project 101, but there have to be at least ten contestants to start it. The two late contestants are Wataru Matsumura, whose bag was stolen again, and Misaki Tadokoro. It is revealed Misaki is a former professional dancer who suddenly quit five years ago. On the other side of the building, Kazuhiko Sugii accidentally met the show's CEO when delivering wardrobes, and is recommended to audition. The group is eventually ready to start after Misaki rushes into the venue. However, believing there must be a good reason behind Misaki's comeback to the entertainment industry, they decide to wait for him. Cast : JO1, Marika Itō, Zen Kajihara

== Production ==
=== Development ===
On December 12, 2021, it was announced that the Japanese boy band JO1 would release their first drama Short Program. Takeshi Moriya, known for Midnight Swan and the 2020 remake of Tokyo Love Story, was announced as one of the producers. The production companies involved in the series were Atmovie Inc. and Lapone Entertainment, while Yoshimoto Kogyo acted as the distributor. Ryohei Watanabe, Takeo Kikuchi, Naho Kamimura, Tetsuhiko Tsuchiya, Takashi Masuyama, and Takeshi Moriya were appointed to direct the episodes. Each director and scriptwriter decided which episode they would take based on what they had discussed together. The principal photography took place from Summer to Fall 2021.

=== Casting ===
With nearly all members of JO1 being inexperienced in acting, the production was preceded by a series of acting workshops before the directors decided roles for each member. On February 14, 2022, the list of leading roles and titles of each episode was announced. Natsumi Okamoto, Honoka Yahagi, Sakurako Konishi and others were announced to play the female protagonists the next day. Itsuji Itao and other supporting casts were announced on February 22. Former member of Nogizaka46 Marika Itō was announced to play the female protagonist of the surprise last episode released on March 14, 2022.

=== Music ===
The opening theme song is composed by Yoshitaka Fujimoto. The ending theme song for the series titled "Dreamer" by JO1 was released digitally on February 14, 2022. Its music video featuring scenes from the series was released the next day.

== Release ==
The first three episodes of Short Program were released on Amazon Prime Video in Japan on March 1, 2022, at 5 p.m Japan Standard Time (UTC+09:00). The premiere was accompanied by the release of Produce 101 Japan director's cut version. The subsequent episodes were released within 2–3 days interval with the final two episodes released on March 9, 2022. A surprise 12th episode was later announced on March 14, 2022 and released on the same date at 5 p.m JST.

== Reception ==
=== Critical response ===
Entertainment writers Akiko Shin, Ayaka Sakai, and Kana Yoshida wrote a series of reviews on the series for Quick Japan, and praised several members of JO1 for their first attempt at acting. Shin, in particular, was impressed by Shion Tsurubo's ability in "creating an atmosphere" in "Spring Passes", stating "although the slight intonation of the Kansai dialect remained in his voice, it did not bother him as his facial expressions spoke more than his words". Sakai called Ren Kawashiri's casting in "The Current State of Affairs" as "apt" since he was "able to transfer the sharpness he had acquired through dancing into his acting, and to carry Sugii's feelings in each of his move." Yoshida praised Keigo Sato's performance in "Blowing Any Which Way" and felt that "even though Sato is playing the opposite of himself, he is able to give a performance that will move the hearts of those who are watching". Meanwhile, Sakai applauded Syoya Kimata for using his personality in "What's Going On!?" by saying "while some actors tend to erase their own personalities and get into their roles, Kimata is the type of actor who does the opposite. In this episode, he used his own charm in his performance and 'possessed' the character even more". Shin later praised Mamehara's expressive eyes in "Memory Off", saying "his large eyes clearly reflect a wide range of emotions: dismay, interest, worry, relief, determination, hesitation, and so on".

The writers also commented on the production side of the series. Yoshida praised "the bold rearrangement" the production team took with "At the Intersection" and wrote "the episode also shows the excitement, confusion, and fantasy of the person Haruhiko sees every day, as well as the feelings from the female protagonist's side, making us want to root for them even more. In such a short period of time, each character is portrayed well". Sakai praised the direction by Takashi Masuyama in "What's Going On!?" despite "the rapidly changing circumstances" in the episode. She also praised "the nostalgic and dramatic feel" created by the combination of images and the music score by Yoshitaka Fujimoto in "A Stop on the Way".
