= Small and Mighty =

Taiwanese television series

Chinese name
- Traditional Chinese: 正義的算法
- Simplified Chinese: 正义的算法
Transcriptions
Standard Mandarin
- Hanyu Pinyin: Zhèngyì de suànfǎ
- Genre: Legal comedy drama
- Based on: Kevin Hill by Jorge A. Reyes
- Directed by: Hsu Fu-hsiang
- Starring: Chen Bolin; Puff Kuo
- Country of origin: Taiwan
- Original language: Mandarin
- No. of seasons: 1
- No. of episodes: 26

Production
- Producers: Zhang Wei-han; Duan Yi-lun
- Running time: 36-41 minutes
- Production companies: Jason's Entertainment Co., Ltd.

Original release
- Network: Disney+
- Release: 15 June 2022 – July 21, 2022

Small and Mighty (Chinese: 正義的算法; pinyin: Zhèngyì de suànfǎ) is a 2022 Taiwanese television series that was produced by the production company Jason's Entertainment in collaboration with co-producers Disney+ and Bilibili. In Taiwan, the series premiered on June 15, 2022, as an original through Disney+ via Star.

== Synopsis ==
The life of the cunning and greedy lawyer Liu Lang, who lacks any sense of morality and compassion, is turned upside down. Not only does the bachelor lose his lucrative job at a prestigious law firm, but shortly beforehand, five-year-old Liang-liang comes into his life and claims to be his son. Liu Lang doesn't want to believe this and wants to get rid of the cute and thoughtful little boy as quickly as possible. But now he is left without a job, with a child and without shelter. Since all the big law firms reject him, he is forced to start working for the small law firm Chu Hsing, which mainly takes on pro bono cases. The young and idealistic defense attorney Lin Xiao-yan, who is dedicated to justice, also works there. From now on, Liu Lang and Lin Xiao-yan work on cases together. Whether big or small, young or old, rich or poor and regardless of their clients' origins, the two work on a variety of cases that span all social classes. The two fundamentally different colleagues often clash, and they also have little sympathy for each other. Over time, Lang begins to change, caring more and more for Liang-liang, improving his cooperation with Xiao-yan, and trying to look at his cases from a different perspective.

== Cast ==
=== Main starring ===
Role	Actor/Actress	Description
Liu Lang	Chen Bolin	Experienced lawyer who lacks a sense of morality.
Lin Xiao-yan	Puff Kuo	Rookie lawyer who is dedicated to justice.
