= The Moment (Aaron Yan album) =

Studio album by Aaron Yan
- Released: 19 October 2012; November 30, 2012（Private. Diary Ver.） March 6, 2013（Japan 1st limited Ver.／Japan Regular Ver.）
- Recorded: December 19, 2016
- Genre: Mandopop
- Length: 43:47
- Language: Mandarin
- Label: HIM International Music; Pony Canyon (Japan)

Aaron Yan chronology
The Next Me (2011)	The Moment (2012)	Drama (2014)

The Moment (Chinese: 紀念日; pinyin: Ji Nian Ri; lit. 'The Moment') is the first Mandarin solo LP by Aaron Yan of Taiwanese Mandopop quartet boy band Fahrenheit. It was released by HIM International Music on 19 December 2012. The Japanese edition was released on 6 March 2013 by Pony Canyon, which included the Japanese version of title track "紀念日" (The Moment). The LP consists of ten songs performed by Yan.

== Track listing ==
No.	Title	Lyrics	Music	Translation	Length
1.	"被忘錄" (Bei Wang Lu)	Chen Xinyan	Zhang Jianjunwei	Memorandum	4:21
2.	"紀念日" (Ji Nian Ri)	Chen Xinyan	Huang Hanqing	The Moment	4:49
3.	"備份人生" (Bei Fen Ren Sheng)	Chen Jingnan	Zheng Nan	Backup Life	4:29
4.	"可能妳還愛我" (Ke Neng Ni Hai Ai Wo)	Aaron Yan	Pink, Max Martin	The Love Left or Maybe You Still Love Me	4:35
5.	"比寂寞更寂寞" (Bi Ji Mo Geng Ji Mo)	Aaron Yan	Zhang Yifan	Lonelier than lonely	4:48
6.	"換我陪妳" (Huan Wo Pei Ni)	Chen Xinyan	Wang Yan, Huang Zhou	My Turn To Be With You	3:38
7.	"少來" (Shao Lai)	Lan Xiaoxie	Zhang Yifan	Don't Even	4:01
8.	"逾時不候的永恆" (Yu Shi Bu Hou De Yong Heng)	Xu Shi Zheng, Wu Huifu	Zhang Yifan	The Late Eternity	3:47
9.	"原來" (Yuan Lai)	Lan Xiaoxie	Zhang Jianqi	Originally	4:14
10.	"借過" (Jie Guo)	Chen Lerong	Zhong Wanyun	Excuse Me	5:05

== Album version ==
- 不想忘記版 (Don't Want to Forget Ver.) (Pre-order), with calendar
- 永遠記得版 (Always remember Ver.) (Pre-order), with calendar
- 正式版 (Official Ver.)
- 私.日記版 (Private. Diary Ver.), with Photo Lyric book
- 日本初回限定版 (Japanese 1st limited ver.), with DVD of short movies "Valentine's Day, The Moment" and "Maybe You Still Love Me", and music videos "The Moment" and "Backup Life"
- 日本普通版 (Japanese Regular Ver.) with the song "The Moment (Japanese Version)"

== Music videos ==
- "可能妳還愛我" (Maybe You Still Love Me) MV
- "紀念日" (The Moment) MV
- "換我陪妳" (My Turn to be With You) MV
- "原來" (Originally) MV
- "逾時不候的永恆" (The Late Eternity) MV

== Charts ==
=== Taiwan ===
Year	Song	UFO	Hito	MTV	FOX
2012	Maybe You still Love Me	2	1	4	3
2012	The Moment	5	2	-	4
2012	Backup Life	7	3	7	-
2012	My Turn to be With You	-	5	-	-
2013	Originally	-	-	-	-

=== Hong Kong ===
Year	Song	903	TVB	997	RTHK
2012	Maybe You Still Love Me	-	-	1	-
2013	My Turn to be With You	-	-	3	-

=== Singapore ===
Year	Song	YES933	Radio1003
2012	Maybe You Still Love Me	5	1
2012	The Moment	1	17

=== Malaysia ===
Year	Song	988
2012	Maybe You Still Love Me	5
2013	The Moment	12
