= Dream Girls (band) =

Taiwanese girl group

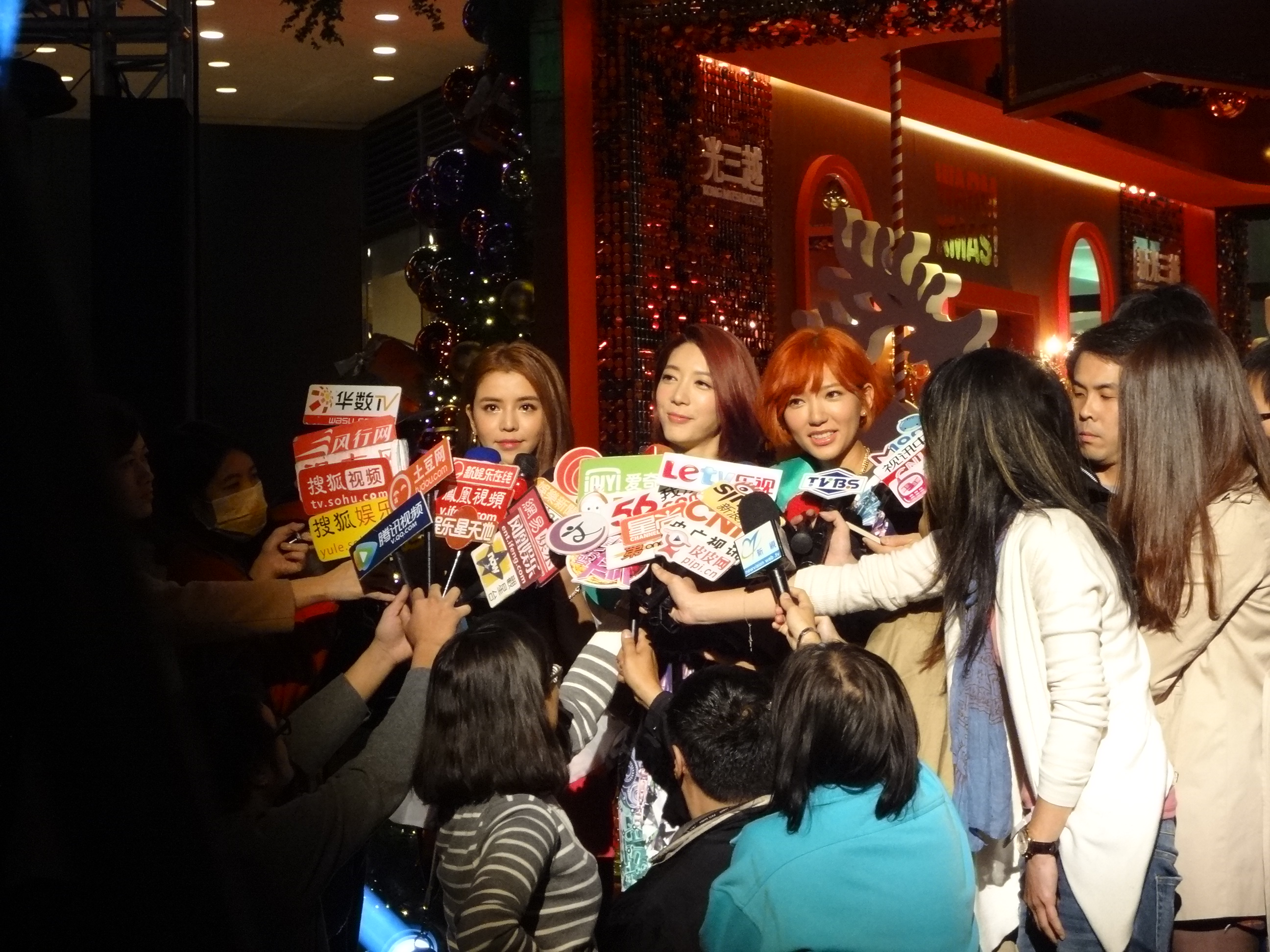

Background information
- Origin: Taiwan
- Genres: Mandopop
- Years active: 2011 – 2015
- Labels: Dorian International Entertainment
- Members: Emily Song; Tia Lee; Puff Kuo
- Website: Official website

Dream Girls was a Taiwanese girl group formed in 2011. The group consisted of members Emily Song, Tia Lee and Puff Kuo.

== Members ==
Dream Girls
Name	Date of birth	Nationality
Emily Song	March 23, 1983 (age 41)	South Korea
Tia Lee	May 11, 1985 (age 39)	Republic of China
Puff Kuo	June 30, 1988 (age 36)	Republic of China

== Discography ==
=== EP Album ===
Album	Album Info	Track Listing
1st	First EP《美夢當前》: Release Date: April 8, 2011; Language: Mandarin	Song List: CD; 1. I'm your dreamgirl 2. 流淚也要美; 3. 軟弱; DVD; 1. 流淚也要美(MV); 2. 软弱(MV); 3. Dream Girls 「築夢」計劃
2nd	2nd EP《Girl's Talk》: Release Date: December 7, 2012; Language: Mandarin	Song List: CD; 1. Dying For Love; 2. Don't stop the music 3. 因為有妳在; 4. 愛情微波爐; 5. 讓你走

=== LP Album ===
Album	Album Info	Track Listing
1st	1st LP 《美麗頭條》: Release Date: December 27, 2013; Language: Mandarin	Song List: CD; 1. 美麗頭條; 2. 聽你說; 3. 雪人的眼淚(Puff solo); 4. 我跟她們不一樣(Tia solo); 5. 再見我愛你(Emily solo); 6. 隨風而過; 7. Amazing; 8. 聽說愛情回來過; 9. 來得及愛你(Tia solo)【濤女郎主題曲】; 10. Whatever(美麗頭條 korean ver.)

== Tours and concerts ==
Date	Name	Venue
August 6, 2011	臺北親水節水岸 LOVERS 迷戀演唱會	
November 27, 2011	MTV封神榜演唱會	
December 10, 2011	新竹公益演唱會	Hsinchu
December 31, 2011	2012台中市跨年晚會	Taichung
December 31, 2011	2012龍來台南跨年晚會	Tainan
December 31, 2011	2012新竹縣跨年晚會	Hsinchu
August 18, 2012	MTV封神榜演唱會	
December 31, 2012	2013台中跨年晚會 就是要這Young	Taichung
December 31, 2012	2013 高雄跨年晚會 不思議港都跨年夜	Kaohsiung
December 31, 2012	2013 嘉義跨年晚會 全嘉藝起來	Chiayi
December 31, 2012	2013新北市歡樂耶誕城 樂夜耶誕演唱會	Taipei 市民廣場
December 31, 2012	2014台北最high新年城跨年晚會	市民廣場 (Taipei)
December 31, 2012	2014新竹縣跨年晚會 迎向光明新竹動起來	Hsinchu 政府廣場

== Awards and nominations ==
Year	Award	Category	Recipient	Result
2011	YAHOO Most Searched Award	Most Popular Female Group	Dream Girls	Won
2014	10th Hito Music Awards	Most Popular Group	Dream Girls	Won
