= Natsumi Kiyoura =

Japanese actress and singer from Chiba (born 1990)

- Born: Natsumi Kiyoura; July 4, 1990 (age 36); Chiba, Japan
- Occupations: Actress, singer
- Years active: 2003–present

Natsumi Kiyoura (清浦夏実, Kiyoura Natsumi; born July 4, 1990) is a Japanese actress and singer from Chiba. She is represented by the talent agency Oscar Promotion. Her music records have been released under Flying Dog.

== Career ==
Kiyoura made her acting debut in 2003 on the tokusatsu TV series Pretty Guardian Sailor Moon. In 2005, she became Sponichi Annex's third image girl (or "Anecco" as they call it). She debuted as a singer in 2007 with the single "Kaze Sagashi", theme song for the Sketch Book ~full color's~ anime series. She has since performed theme songs for other anime series, including Spice and Wolf, Sgt. Frog, Ristorante Paradiso, and Sasameki Koto. She released her first album Juukuiro in 2010.

Since 2015 she is the lead singer of the band Tweedees, fronting the band together with bass player and songwriter Reiji Okii from the famous 1990's band Cymbals.

== Filmography ==
=== Film ===
Tsukue no Nakami (2007)

=== Television ===
Pretty Guardian Sailor Moon (2003–2004) Kinpachi-sensei (7th series, 2004–2005)

== Discography ==
=== Singles ===
"Kaze Sagashi" (Released October 24, 2007)

- Anime television series Sketchbook ~full color's~ opening theme

"Tabi no Tochuu" (Released February 6, 2008)

- Anime television series Spice and Wolf opening theme

"Bokura no Aikotoba" (Released July 23, 2008)

- Anime television series Sgt. Frog ending theme and insert song

"Kanashii Hodo Aoku / Nijiiro Pocket" (Released October 21, 2009)

- Anime television series Sasameki Koto opening and ending themes

"Hologram" (Released November 23, 2011)

- Anime television series Phi Brain: Puzzle of God ending theme

=== Albums ===
Juuku Iro (Released February 24, 2010)

=== Other ===
CM Yoko 2 (Yoko Kanno album; Released April 22, 2009)

- "Obento o Tabenagara" (2008 Hotto Motto CM song)
