= Tomoki Hirose =

Japanese actor (born 1987)

- 廣瀬 智紀
- Born: February 14, 1987 (age 39); Saitama, Japan
- Occupation: Actor
- Years active: 2009–present
- Agent: Stardust Promotion
- Notable work: Yowamushi Pedal; Ace of Diamond
- Spouse: Rina Kawaei (m. 2019; div. 2026)
- Children: 2

Tomoki Hirose (Japanese: 廣瀬 智紀, Hepburn: Hirose Tomoki; born February 14, 1987) is a Japanese actor represented by Stardust Promotion.

== Personal life ==
Hirose announced his marriage to actress and former AKB48 member Rina Kawaei in 2019 and that they were expecting their first child together. They have two children, born in November 2019 and June 2023. On April 10, 2026, Hirose and Kawaei jointly announced through their respective official social media accounts that their divorce have been finalized, which confirmed media reports speculating their separation earlier that month. The two promised to co-parent their two children together.

== Filmography ==
=== Drama ===
- The Memorandum of Kyoko Okitegami (2015) - Employee of Drink Kitchen (Ep. 9)
- Dansui! (2017) - Ryoya Kawasaki
- Majimuri Gakuen (2018) - Crazy Dog Jack / Shinichi Inuyama
- Masked Reunion (2019) - Kataoka Yamato
- Short Program (2022) - Kakimoto (Ep. 9)

=== Super Sentai ===
- Avataro Sentai Donbrothers (2022-2023) - Sonoshi

=== Movies ===
- Touken Ranbu (2019) - Uguisumaru
- Don't Lose Your Head! (2024) - Kataoka Gengoemon

=== Stage Play ===
- Peony flower (2009)
- EBiDAN(Ebisu Academy Boys' Club)
  - The culture festival of EBiDAN...well it's not really a festival version (2010)
  - Arashi no Seaside School !! Waves, Fights, Ebidans are Super Atukirin Patterns!! version (2011)
- GO-SUNS "Pistol" (2010)
- Theater Company "TAIYO MAGIC FILM" - "Hero" (2012) - Matsushima Ryuji
- Gokujo Bungaku "Night on the Galactic Railroad" (2012) - Giovanni
- High School Opera Company☆ Boys Group (2012) - Okajima Tetsuya
- Martini! Press right now for a 5 hours recording (2013) - Imamura Hayato
- Reading play "Tails' friends 2"
  - Koyuki, Koharu and Kotaro (2013) - Kotaro
  - A dog searching for a marriage partner (2013) - Goemon / Lupine
- Theater Company "TAIYO MAGIC FILM" - "Akane no Ma" (2013) - Takahama Yusuke
- Stage play "Yowamushi Pedal" - Makishima Yusuke
  - Inter High Chapter: The First Result (2013)
  - Inter High Chapter: The Second Order (2014)
  - Inter High Chapter: The WINNER (2015)
  - IRREGULAR ~ Two Summits (2015)
- Stage play "My Host-chan" - Yuki Ojo
  - "My Host-chan" (2013)
  - "My Host-chan" - Blood Fight! Fukuoka Nakasu edition (2014)
  - "My Host-chan" - Clash! Sakae edition (2016)
- Reading play "Tails' friends 3"
  - Dog graduation (2013) - Rocket
  - August adventure (2013) - Haruo
- Our tomorrow (2014) - Shinpei Goto
- Tumbling FINAL (2014) - Kaneko Ryota
- Reading play "My plan of marrying a rich man" (2014) - Gerve
- Reading play "The eraser in my head" - Kosuke
  - 7th letter (2015)
  - 8th letter (2016)
- Takiguchi flame (2015) - Tomonori Yagyu
- Stage play "Ace of Diamond" - Satoru Furuya
  - "Ace of Diamond The LIVE" (2015)
  - "Ace of Diamond The LIVE II" (2016)
  - "Ace of Diamond The LIVE III" (2016)
  - "Ace of Diamond The LIVE V" (2017)
- Reading play "Tails' friends 4"
  - Rokujo Ichima Kingdom (2015) - Ryunosuke
  - Dog collage (2015) - Ryunosuke
- "New Year's Meijiza Offering Festival" Part 2 "Mononoke Show" (2015) - Guest appearance
- WORLD - beyond the destiny -(2016) - Ryuji
- Scarlet Pimpanell (2016) - Haru
- Dansui! (2017) - Kawasaki Ryoya
- Seven Souls in the Skull Castle - Season Moon (2017-2018) - Mukaiya Ranbei/ Mori Ranmaru
- Susanoo and Mikoto ~ Kojiki ~ (2018) - Susanoo
- A phonecall from my boyfriend (2018) - Fujiwara Hayao
- Recitated stage "Tomorrow I will date with yesterday's you" (2018) - Takatoshi Minamiyama
- "HERO" - Summer 2019 - (2019) - Iizura Hiroki
- The Count of Monte Christo - Kuroki Shougun to Catherine (2020) - Prosecutor Gérard de Villefort
