= Kobe Collection =

Annual Fashion Event

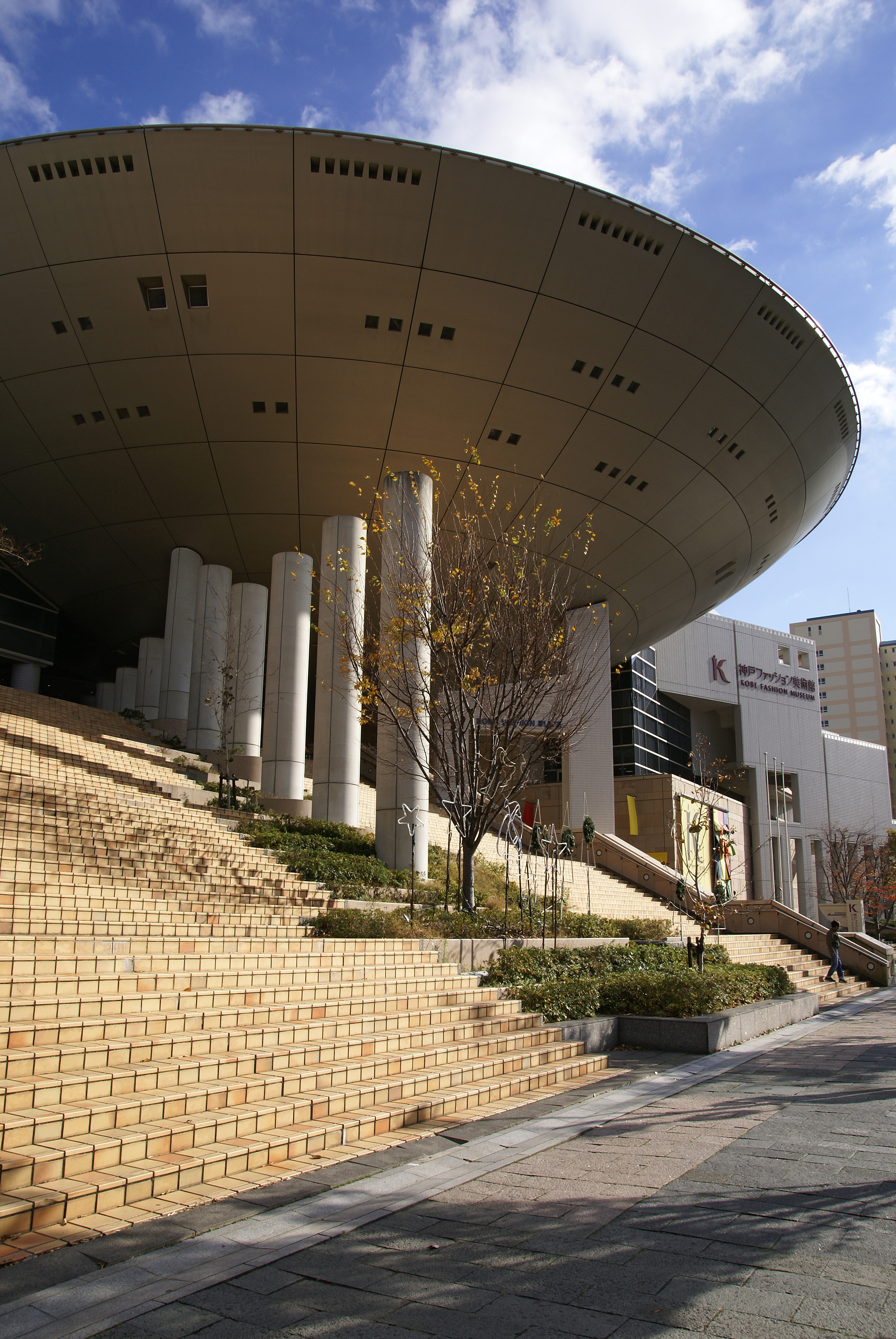
Kobe Fashion Museum in Rokko Island, Kobe, Hyogo, Japan

The Kobe Collection (神戸コレクション) is a fashion event that has been held in Kobe, Japan and other cities during spring and autumn every year since 2002; over 30 brands have participated. It is characteristically a public relations event for consumers, and a chance for young designers to publish their own designs.

In the second half of the 19th century, there were many trading companies and banks that made inroads into Kobe, and the comparatively wealthy families who worked for these companies, tended to live on the mountain side of Kobe and Ashiya. Originally the Kobe fashion-style was seen in children of such wealthy families. The fashion-style was characterized by the refined everyday wear which in quiet colors (navy blue, black, white and gray), in contrast to the popular style for girls in Osaka. From around 1990, many Japanese women's magazines came to take up this style, because it is known to look refined and cute by women in their teens and early 20s. A magazine named Kobe Style focuses on the style trends of Kobe.

The mode of "Kobe-Style" has somewhat changed, although it is expressed as a pronoun of a conservative fashion in Japan currently, it has been popular among young Japanese girls. Kobe collection has held a strong social background in Japan and surrounding east-Asian countries; In 2007, Kobe collection was held in Shanghai, Yokohama, and in Kobe.

And Kobe collection will hold in Second Life, an Internet-based virtual world developed by Linden Research, Inc (commonly referred to as Linden Lab).

== Sponsors (2002 - 2007) ==
- American Express
- Asahi Breweries
- Asahi Kasei
- Coca-Cola
- Daimaru
- Häagen-Dazs
- JJ (magazine)
- Kirin Brewery Company
- Kodansha
- Mainichi Broadcasting System
- Namco Bandai
- Nissan Motors
- Shiseido
- Thailand
- Tokyo Broadcasting System
- Toshiba
- VISA Japan
- UCC Ueshima Coffee Co.
- Wacoal
