= Cut (EP) =

EP by Aaron Yan
- Released: 27 June 2014
- Genre: Mandopop
- Length: 25:25
- Language: Mandarin
- Label: HIM International Music

Aaron Yan chronology
Drama (2014)	Cut (2014)

Cut is the third Mandarin solo mini album by Aaron Yan of Taiwanese Mandopop quartet boy band Fahrenheit. It was released by HIM International Music on June 27, 2014. The EP consists of six songs performed by Yan.

== Track listing ==
No.	Title	Lyrics	Music	Translation	Length
1.	"一刀不剪" (Yi Dao Bu Jian)	Zhou Yaohui	JerryC	No Cut	3:38
2.	"大智若娛" (Da Zhi Ruo Yu)	Ge Dawei	Ryan B.	Entertainer	4:44
3.	"現在開始" (Xian Zai Kai Shi)	Real, Cozy Diary, Shi Rencheng	Real	Starting From Now	4:02
4.	"好想對他說" (Hao Xiang Dui Ta Shuo)	Lan Xiaoxie	Real	It Will Be Fine	4:32
5.	"綁架愛情" (Bang Jia Ai Qing)	Xu Shizhen, Wu Huifu	Ryan B.	Kidnap Love	3:36
6.	"台北沉睡了" (Tai Bei Chen Shui Le)	Chen Xinyan	Zhang Jianjunwei	Taipei Dreamin	4:53

== Music videos ==
Song	Producer	Date	Collaboration
台北沉睡了 (Taipei Dreamin')	Huang Zhongping	August 12, 2013	Liu Yushan (Popu Lady)
一刀不剪 (No Cut)	Duo Tianzhuoye	June 23, 2014	Lena Fujii
