= Song Mi-jin =

South Korean singer and actress (born 1983)

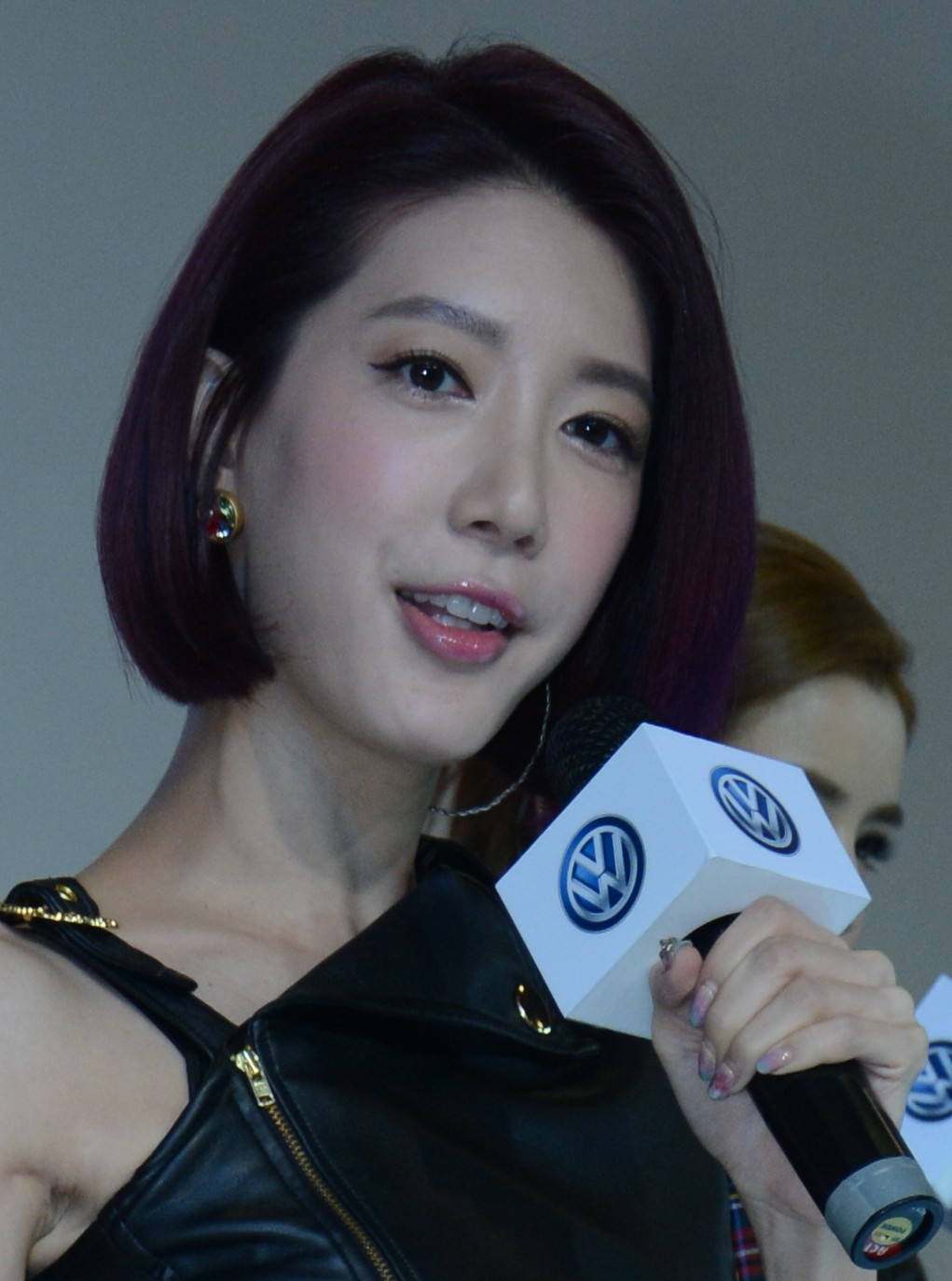
- Song in 2013

Background information
- Born: March 23, 1983 (age 43); Seoul, South Korea
- Occupations: Singer; actress

Korean name
- Hangul: 송미진
- Hanja: 宋米秦
- RR: Song Mijin
- MR: Song Mijin

Song Mi-jin (Korean: 송미진; born March 23, 1983), known as Emily Song is a South Korean singer and actress. She is a member of Taiwanese girl group Dream Girls.

== Filmography ==
=== Television series ===
Year	Title	Role
2009	Invincible Lee Pyung Kang	Clerk
2013	Fabulous Boys	Herself
2014	Adhere to the Spirit	Mi-jin
2015	Rainbow Fairy	

=== Films ===
Year	Title	Role
2013	Rhythm of the Rain	
