= Falling into You (TV series) =

2020 Taiwanese horror TV series

- Chinese: 因为我喜欢你
- Genre: Drama
- Written by: Pei-Yu Lin
- Directed by: Choon Hooi Ker; Ching-Fang Lin
- Starring: Puff Kuo; Jiro Wang
- Composer: 徐儀芳 余政憲
- Country of origin: Taiwan
- Original language: Mandarin
- No. of seasons: 1
- No. of episodes: 13

Production
- Producers: Kelly Kuo; Sin-Guei Wang
- Running time: 72 minutes

Original release
- Network: Taiwan Television
- Release: 19 September – 26 December 2020

Falling into You (simplified Chinese: 因为我喜欢你; traditional Chinese: 因為我喜歡你) is a Taiwanese drama streaming television show, created for Taiwan Television and released on streaming platform Viki through its channel on Apple TV and Netflix internationally. It premiered on 19 September 2020.

== Plot ==
Chen Zi Tong (Puff Kuo) is down on her luck. She was once a promising taekwondo athlete with hopes of competing at the Olympic Games, but she suffered a knee injury inflicted by a scheming friend and a disloyal boyfriend that made her turn her back on her sporting ambitions. Chen still dreams of returning to competition, but has been forced to take on a job as a worker at a startup delivery company where she meets its young, successful CEO Fang Zhi Sheng (Jiro Wang). She manages to land a job at his company's head office, but Fang soon discovers she is not that interested in him. However, Fang Zhi Sheng suffers from hemophobia and is scared at the sight of blood. Slowly, the unconventional duo begins to form a bond over this disease. Fang helps encourage Chen to start rehabilitating her injury and return to training while she helps him confront his fears.

== Cast ==
- Puff Kuo as Chen Zi Tong
- Jiro Wang as Fang Zhi Sheng
- Desmond Tan as Chen Tian-Lin
- Peng Yuchang as Fang Qing

== Release ==
The series started airing on 19 September 2020 on TTV. The series is an addition to Netflix's Chinese Language Originals collection as well as part of the Viki catalogue. In Singapore, the series is available on MeWATCH and will be premiere in March 2021 on Mediacorp TV Channel 8.
