= Emily Ge Song =

Chinese-American media executive

Emily Ge Song or Song Ge (Chinese: 宋歌; born 1990 or 1991) is a Chinese-American executive at e.l.f. Beauty, a former executive at Creative Artists Agency, and a former TV host at China Central Television. In 2018, she was named by Forbes in the "30 under 30" list for Asia.

== Biography ==
Song Ge was born and raised in Tianjin, China, in 1990 or 1991. As a teenager, she worked as a TV host for China Central Television.

When she was in college, she interviewed Warren Buffett and Bill Clinton.

After finishing high school, Song studied Product Design Engineering at Stanford University, where she ran a TV station on campus. After Stanford, Song worked on Broadway musical productions in San Francisco, before receiving an MBA from Harvard Business School.

After graduating from Harvard, Song moved to Los Angeles to work as an executive at Creative Artists Agency, the world's largest entertainment agency. In her position at CAA, she helped guide China-U.S. investment decisions for upwards of 150 million dollars in films, TV, sports, and music. She was named to Forbes Magazine's "30 under 30" list for Asia in 2018.

She moved to United Talent Agency in 2019, and was named to Variety's "Hollywood's New Leaders" list in 2021.

In 2024, Song joined e.l.f. Beauty as Head of Immersive Marketing, leading the company's gaming, platform, and brand partnership strategy. Under her leadership, e.l.f. expanded its presence on Roblox across three branded experiences: e.l.f. UP!, Glow Up!, and Fortune Island.

In July 2024, e.l.f. became the first beauty brand to test real-world commerce on Roblox, launching a Walmart-powered virtual kiosk within e.l.f. UP! that let users purchase physical products alongside a digital "virtual twin" item.

In April 2025, the brand launched Fortune Island: Earn, Learn, Flex, developed with Chime, becoming the first beauty brand to launch a financial literacy game on Roblox. e.l.f. UP! won Best Use of Immersive Marketing at the 2025 Roblox Innovation Awards. In 2026, the Fortune Island game and the "e.l.f. x Sailing with Phoenix" earned-media campaign were named Webby Award Honoree and Webby Award Nominee, respectively.

The "Sailing with Phoenix" campaign, which Song led, involved e.l.f. air-dropping a care package, including SPF products, to sailor Oliver Widger during a solo Pacific Ocean voyage, a story covered by People and other outlets.

Song also led e.l.f.'s 2025 partnership with HoYoverse's mobile game Honkai: Star Rail, activated at Anime Expo; the brand's feature in the April 2025 pilot of Wicked Saints Studios' World Reborn, an activism-focused mobile game centered on women's sports empowerment; and e.l.f.'s Roblox collaboration with Moose Toys' XOX Kweenies collectible toy line, described by The Toy Insider as the first beauty-and-toy crossover campaign on Roblox.
