= Tired =

Tired may refer to:

== Emotional or physical state ==
- Fatigue, a feeling of exhaustion
- Sleepy, having the need for sleep

== Geography ==
- Tired Mountain, a mountain in Alaska

== Music ==
=== EPs ===
- Tired (EP), a 2002 EP by Monkey Majik

=== Songs ===
- "Tired" (Alan Walker song), from 2017
- "Tired" (Stone Sour song), a song by Stone Sour from House of Gold & Bones - Part 1
- "Tired", a song by Adele on 19 from 2007
- "Tired", a song by LCD Soundsystem on LCD Soundsystem from 2005
- "Tired", a song by Rollins Band on Weight from 1994
- "Tired", a song originally performed by Tabitha's Secret, covered by Matchbox Twenty
- "Tired", a song by Vaughan Williams from Four Last Songs (Vaughan Williams)
- "Tired", a song by Willa Ford on Willa Was Here from 2001
- "Tired", a song by Kelly Price from 2011

== See also ==
- Tire (disambiguation)
