= Teyr =

Teyr can refer to:

- Teyr, the number 3 in
  - Cornish
  - Cumbrian dialect
  - Brythonic Celtic languages used by shepherds in Northern England

== See also ==
- Tyr (disambiguation)
