= Monkey Majik discography =

- Studio albums: 14
- Extended plays: 4
- Live albums: 6
- Compilation albums: 5
- Singles: 30

The discography of Monkey Majik consists of fourteen studio albums, five compilation albums and numerous singles and digital downloads. The band's releases were originally self-released in Sendai, after which they were signed to independent label and management Under Horse Records, and released material through there between 2004 and 2005. In 2005, Monkey Majik were signed to major label Avex Entertainment, and continue to release under the Binyl Records sub-label.

Monkey Majik have four certified albums by the RIAJ, including the platinum Sora wa Marude (2007). They have five songs that were commercially successful enough to receive certifications, including the double platinum "Around the World" (2006) and "Sora wa Marude" (2007).

== Albums ==
=== Studio albums ===
| Year | Details | Chart positions | Total sales | Certifications |
| Year | Details | JPN | Total sales | Certifications |
|---|---|---|---|---|
| 2003 | Spade: Released: September 24, 2003; Label: Under Horse Records; Formats: Compact disc, digital download | 192 | 6,400 | |
| 2005 | Eastview: Released: September 21, 2005; Label: Under Horse Records; Formats: Compact disc, digital download | 122 | 14,000 | |
| 2006 | Thank You: Released: May 24, 2006; Label: Binyl Records; Formats: Compact disc, digital download, rental CD | 5 | 97,000 | RIAJ: Gold |
| 2007 | Sora wa Marude: Released: July 25, 2007; Label: Binyl Records; Formats: Compact disc, digital download, rental CD | 3 | 266,000 | RIAJ: Platinum |
| 2008 | Time: Released: September 3, 2008; Label: Binyl Records; Formats: Compact disc, digital download, rental CD | 2 | 116,000 | RIAJ: Gold |
| 2011 | Westview: Released: February 2, 2011; Label: Binyl Records; Formats: Compact disc, digital download, rental CD | 9 | 18,000 | |
| 2012 | Somewhere Out There: Released: March 7, 2012; Label: Binyl Records; Formats: Compact disc, digital download, rental CD | 7 | 16,700 | |
| 2013 | DNA: Released: October 16, 2013; Label: Binyl Records; Formats: Compact disc, digital download, rental CD | 11 | | |
| 2015 | Colour By Number: Released: February 4, 2015; Label: Binyl Records; Formats: Compact disc, digital download, rental CD | 16 | | |
| 2016 | Southview: Released: March 9, 2016; Label: Binyl Records; Formats: Compact disc, digital download, rental CD | 21 | | |
| 2018 | Enigma: Released: March 21, 2018; Label: Binyl Records; Formats: Compact disc, digital download, rental CD | 28 | | |
| 2020 | Northview: Released: February 26, 2020; Label: Binyl Records; Formats: Compact disc, digital download | 23 | 1,903 (Phy.) | |
| 2023 | Curtain Call: Released: January 25, 2023; Label: Binyl Records | 38 | 1,261 (Phy.) | |
| 2024 | Circles: Released: July 24, 2024; Label: A.S.A.B | 45 | 1,124 (Phy.) | |

=== Compilation albums ===
| Year | Album Information | Chart positions | Total sales | Certifications |
|---|---|---|---|---|
| 2006 | Best 2000–2005: Independently released greatest hits album; Released: March 8, 2006; Label: Under Horse Records (UHR-11); Formats: Compact disc, digital download | 18 | 37,000 | |
| 2010 | Monkey Majik Best: 10 Years & Forever: Greatest hits album; Released: July 14, 2010; Label: Binyl Records (AVCH-78014); Formats: Compact disc, digital download, rental CD | 4 | 83,000 | RIAJ: Gold |
| 2010 | Rare Tracks: B-sides and rarities album; Released: March 2, 2011; Label: Binyl Records (AVCH-78030); Formats: Compact disc, digital download, rental CD | 28 | 6,700 | |
| 2012 | English Best: Released: December 5, 2012 | 34 | | |
| 2015 | Monkey Majik Best: A.RI.GA.TO: Released: October 21, 2015 | 19 | | |
| 2020 | MONKEY MAJIK BEST Special Selection Edition by Maynard, Blaise, TAX & DICK: Released November 18, 2020 | | | |
| 2021 | BEST ALBUM「20th Anniversary BEST 花鳥風月」: Released: January 20, 2021 | | | |

== Extended plays ==
| Year | Album Information | Chart positions | Total sales |
|---|---|---|---|
| 2002 | Tired: Self-released; Released: May 13, 2002; Format: Compact disc; Limited 1,000 copy release at Tower Records Sendai | — | — |
| 2005 | Lily: Independently released; Released: February 9, 2005; Label: Under Horse Records (UHR-4); Formats: Compact disc, digital download | 221 | 2,400 |
| 2005 | Get Started: Independently released; Released: April 13, 2005; Label: Under Horse Records (UHR-005); Formats: Compact disc, digital download | 135 | 4,300 |
| 2005 | Premium Box: Independently released; Released: July 2005; Label: Under Horse Records (UHR-005); Format: CD+DVD | — | — |

== Singles ==
| Release | Title | Notes | Chart positions | | | Oricon sales | Album |
| Release | Title | Notes | Oricon Singles Charts | Billboard Japan Hot 100† | RIAJ digital tracks† | Oricon sales | Album |
|---|---|---|---|---|---|---|---|
| 2006 | "Fly" | Debut single under Binyl Records | 19 | — | — | 43,000 | Thank You |
| 2006 | "Around the World" | Drama Saiyūki theme song. Certified double platinum for ringtones, platinum for cellphone downloads, gold for PC downloads and gold for physical copies. | 4 | — | — | 164,000 | Thank You |
| 2006 | "Futari" (フタリ; "Together") | | 15 | — | 28* | 11,000 | Sora wa Marude |
| 2007 | "Picture Perfect" | Collaboration with M-Flo | 23 | — | 41* | 10,000 | Sora wa Marude |
| 2007 | "Sotsugyō, Soshite Mirai e." (卒業、そして未来へ。; "Graduation, then onto Your Future.") | Collaboration with Seamo | 24 | — | 25* | 11,000 | Sora wa Marude |
| 2007 | "Change" | Collaboration with Yoshida Brothers | 52 | — | 91* | 6,000 | Sora wa Marude |
| 2007 | "Monkey Majik × Monkey Magic" | Saiyūki-themed release | 20 | — | — | 33,000 | Sora wa Marude |
| 2007 | "Sora wa Marude" (空はまるで; "The Sky Is Just Like") | Radio single, certified as a double platinum ringtone, platinum cellphone download. | — | — | 8* | — | Sora wa Marude |
| 2008 | "Together / Akari / Fall Back" (あかり; "Light") | Certified gold as a cellphone download | 11 | 8 | 23* | 35,000 | Time |
| 2008 | "Aitakute / Morning-Evening / Goin' Places" (あいたくて; "I Miss You") | | 21 | 17 | 73* | 11,000 | Time |
| 2008 | "Tada, Arigatō" (ただ、ありがとう; "Just, Thank You") | Certified gold as a cellphone download | 28 | 13 | 23* | 9,600 | Time |
| 2009 | "Aishiteru" (アイシテル; "I Love You") | Certified gold as a cellphone download | 12 | 7 | 7 | 14,000 | 10 Years & Forever |
| 2009 | "Lupin the Third" | Digital download, Lupin III theme song cover | — | — | 13 | — | Lupin the Third; Dance & Drive; Official Covers & Remixes |
| 2009 | "Niji-iro no Sakana / Open Happiness / Monster" (虹色の魚; "Rainbow-colored Fish") | | 22 | 10; 40 — | 32; 44 — | 5,000 | 10 Years & Forever |
| 2010 | "Sakura" ("Cherry Blossoms") | | 19 | 1 | 27 | 6,000 | 10 Years & Forever |
| 2010 | "Fast Forward" | Released as a rental single | — | — | 36 | — | 10 Years & Forever |
| 2010 | "Sunshine" | Anime Nura: Rise of the Yokai Clan theme song | 53 | 86 | 24 | 5,000 | Westview |
| 2011 | "Mahō no Kotoba" (魔法の言葉; "Magic Words") | Digital download | — | — | — | — | Westview |
| 2011 | "Yume no Sekai" (夢の世界; "World of Dreams") | Radio single | — | 20 | 44 | — | Westview |
| 2011 | "Ki o Ueta Otoko" (木を植えた男; "Man Who Grew a Tree") | Digital download, 2011 Tohoku earthquake charity single | — | — | — | — | Somewhere Out There |
| 2011 | "Headlight" | | 30 | 5 | 14 | 6,300 | Somewhere Out There |
| 2012 | "Hero" | | 54 | 7 | 67 | 1,800 | Somewhere Out There |
| 2012 | "A Christmas Song" | | 22 | — | | | DNA |
| 2013 | "If" | | 64 | — | | | DNA |
| 2013 | "Story" | | 59 | — | | | DNA |
| 2014 | "Natsu no Jōji" (夏の情事; "Summer Love Affair") | | 64 | — | | | Colour by Number |
| 2014 | "You Are Not Alone" | | 105 | — | | | Colour by Number |
| 2016 | "A.I. am Human" | | 90 | 89 | | | enigma |
| 2017 | "ray of light -movie ver.-" | | | | | | enigma |
| 2017 | "Is this love?" | | 96 | | | | enigma |
| 2018 | "Umāberasu"|ウマーベラス|"Umarvelous" | Released: August 8, 2018 | | | | | |
| 2018 | "配信シングル「クリスマスキャロルの頃には -NORTH FLOW-」" | Digital Single Released: December 5, 2018 | | | | | |
| 2019 | "配信シングル「Bitten By You」" | Digital Single Released: October 23, 2019 | | | | | |
| 2020 | "Eden" | Anime Fruits Basket (2019) theme song Released: July 7, 2020 | | | | | |
| 2020 | "gift" | Released: December 23, 2020 | | | | | |
| 2021 | "S.O.S (Zero-One Others: Kamen Rider Metsubou Jinrai)" | Released: July 14, 2021 | | | | | |
| 2021 | "Frontier (Zero-One Others: Kamen Rider Vulcan & Valkyrie)" | Released: November 10, 2021 | | | | | |
| 2022 | "Running In The Dark (Image Song for Arknights Mobile Game)" | Released: October 24, 2022 | | | | | |
* charted on monthly Chaku-uta Reco-kyō Chart. †Japan Hot 100 established February 2008, RIAJ Digital Track Chart established April 2009.
