= Tyre =

Tyre most often refers to:

- Tyre (wheel), or tire, the outer part of a wheel
- Tyre, Lebanon, a Mediterranean city

Tyre or Tyres may also refer to:

== Other places ==
=== Lebanon ===
- See of Tyre, a Christian diocese
- Tyre District, in the South Governorate
- Tyre Hippodrome, a UNESCO World Heritage site

=== United States ===
- Tyre, Michigan
- Tyre, New York

== Astronomy ==
- Tyre (Europa), a multi-ring impact crater on Europa, the fourth-largest moon of Jupiter.

== Mythology ==
- Tyres, one of two minor Greek mythological figures

== People with the name ==
- Colin Tyre, Lord Tyre (born 1956), Scottish judge
- Ralph Tyre, (1933–2019), American politician
- Tyre Glasper (born 1987), American football player
- Tyre Nichols (1993–2023), American man killed by police
- Tyre Phillips (born 1997), American football player
- Tyre West (born 2003), American football player
- Tyre York (1836–1916), American politician

== See also ==
- Siege of Tyre (disambiguation)
- Tire (disambiguation)
- Tyer, a surname
- Tyers (disambiguation)
- Tyr (disambiguation)
- Tyree (disambiguation)
