= Takumi Kawanishi =

Japanese singer and actor (born 1999)

- 川西 拓実
- Kawanishi in May 2026
- Born: June 23, 1999 (age 27); Hyogo, Japan
- Other name: T.K
- Occupations: Singer; actor
- Years active: 2019–present
- Musical career
- Genres: J-pop; K-pop
- Instrument: Vocals
- Label: Lapone
- Member of: JO1
- Website: Official website

Japanese name
- Kanji: 川西 拓実
- Hiragana: かわにし たくみ
- Romanization: Kawanishi Takumi

Korean name
- Hangul: 카와니시 타쿠미
- Revised Romanization: Kawanisi Takumi
- McCune–Reischauer: K'awanisi T'ak'umi

Takumi Kawanishi (川西 拓実, Kawanishi Takumi; born June 23, 1999) is a Japanese singer and actor. He debuted as a member of the Japanese boy band JO1 in 2020, after placing third in the first season of Produce 101 Japan. He is known for his roles in the live action adaptation of Play It Cool, Guys (2023) and the Fuji TV drama series Political Lupin (2026). Kawanishi also collaborated with the band Monkey Majik on their 2026 single "Unstoppable".

== Early life ==
Takumi Kawanishi was born on June 23, 1999, in Hyogo, Japan. Kawanishi played baseball from second grade of elementary school to third grade of high school, with the goal of competing in the Japanese High School Baseball Championships. He shaved his head in elementary school to imitate high school baseball players and once competed against Yomiuri Giants pitcher Iori Yamasaki.

Kawanishi was inspired to become a singer after he happened to watch a concert DVD owned by his mother when he was 11 years old and was practicing by himself ever since. During his third year in middle school, Kawanishi passed the second screening of a national men's talent search, but he canceled the trip to the last round of audition in Tokyo due to a baseball tournament. After graduating from high school, he worked as a buggy engineer at Kawasaki Heavy Industries.

== Career ==
=== 2019–2020: Produce 101 Japan and debut with JO1 ===
In September 2019, Kawanishi convinced his family to allow him to audition for Produce 101 Japan despite having no experience in dancing or singing. The show concluded in December, with Kawanishi finishing third with 252,885 votes. Upon training in Korea, Kawanishi made his debut as a member of JO1 on March 4, 2020, with the release of their first single Protostar under Lapone Entertainment.

=== 2021–present: Acting debut and first EP ===
Kawanishi made his acting debut on February 26, 2021, playing an unnamed role in the Yoshimoto Kogyo-produced anthology film Meters Away, Worlds Apart segment "Today is A Good Day", alongside his group-mates Ren Kawashiri and Syoya Kimata. On March 3, 2023, Kawanishi was cast as Sōma Shiki in the live version of the web manga series Play It Cool, Guys, with Yuta Nakamoto, Dori Sakurada, and Maito Fujioka. The first episode aired on April 14.

Kawanishi wrote JO1's digital single "Happy Unbirthday" for the group's Alice in Wonderland-inspired exhibition, JO1 in Wonderland!. The song was released on March 26, 2024. In May, Kawanishi made his lead feature debut with Hiroki Kazama's Buzzy Noise. He played the recluse electronic music composer Kiyosumi Umino opposite Hiyori Sakurada. Kawanishi worked with music producer Yaffle to record the song "Surge" for the film, and the rearranged version "Surge" (single edit) was made available on April 29, 2024. The digital single also includes the self-written song "Heaven", which Kawanishi described as "a demo song Kiyosumi might have made".

In July 2024, Kawanishi starred in the film Run for Money the Movie: Tokyo Mission, which commemorated the 20th anniversary of Fuji TV's variety show Run for Money: Tōsō-chū. He played the lead role of Tachibana Yamato, a sprinter from Meio University's track and field team, with his groupmates Sukai Kinjo and Syoya Kimata, as well as Sota Nakajima, Taiki Sato, and Leiya Seguchi of Fantastics from Exile Tribe. In October 2025, Kawanishi was cast in Wowow's original drama series on domestic violence victims Shadow Work. Kawanishi played Yūma Araki, a junior detective and partner to the co-lead character. On December 5, JO1 released "Santa-san E" (サンタさんへ, To Santa), a song co-written by Kawanishi and was originally performed a year prior to celebrate the group's fifth anniversary.

On June 17, 2026, Kawanishi released his collaboration with the Japanese band Monkey Majik, "Unstoppable", to commemorate the band's 20th anniversary. He previously listed the band as an artist he admires. On June 24, Kawanishi released his first digital extended play (EP), Sketch, as part of the PlanJ project. (Note: PlanJ is a series of self-produced projects by JO1 members on YouTube, in which they freely express themselves.) Kawanishi later wrote "Murasakiiro" (むらさきいろ) for the drama Fūfu to 16-sai: Kyōki no Rinjin (夫婦と16歳〜狂気の隣人〜, The Married Couple and The 16-Year Old: The Crazy Neighbor), starring band mate Issei Mamehara. In October, Kawanishi and producer Dem Jointz co-wrote the single "Animal" for JO1's eponymous debut US EP. He then released his second EP, Tomorrow, in the same month. Kawanishi plays Ginji Hanazono, the nephew and secretary of Issey Takahashi's character, in the prime time drama series Political Lupin.

== Discography ==
=== Extended plays ===
List of extended plays
Title	Album details	Peak chart position		Sales
Title	Album details	JPN Dig.	JPN DL	Sales
Sketch	Released: June 24, 2026 (JPN); Label: Lapone Entertainment; Formats: Digital download, streaming	7	—	JPN: 806
Tomorrow	Released: October 27, 2026 (JPN); Label: Lapone Entertainment; Formats: Digital download, streaming	6	4	JPN: 552
"—" denotes releases that did not chart or were not released in that region.

=== Singles ===
List of singles as a lead artist, with selected chart positions, showing year released and album name
Title	Year	Peak chart position		Sales	Album
Title	Year	JPN Dig.	JPN DL	Sales	Album
"Surge" (single edit)	2024	—	81	—N/a	Non-album single
"Kyou mo Manten de Manten Janai" (今日も満点で満天じゃない)	2026	—	47	—N/a	Sketch
"Unstoppable" (with Monkey Majik)	2026	45	46	JPN: 729	Frequency
"Saigo no Ai" (最後の愛)	2026	–	–	—N/a	Tomorrow
"—" denotes releases that did not chart or were not released in that region.

=== Songwriting credits ===
All song credits are adapted from the Japanese Society for Rights of Authors, Composers and Publishers's database, unless otherwise noted.

Key
†	Indicates single
#	Indicates a non-commercial release
‡	Indicates songs written solely by Kawanishi

List of songs, showing featured performers, associated album, credited lyricist(s) or composer(s), and year released
Title	Year	Artist(s)	Album	Lyrics		Music		Ref.
Title	Year	Artist(s)	Album	Credit	With	Credit	With	Ref.
"Get Back" #	2021	Shosei, Takumi, Syoya, Shion	JO1 Atelier track (Note: JO1 Atelier is a YouTube series showing the musical growth of JO1 members. The song was later performed during Open the Door concert.)	Yes	Shosei, Syoya, Shion	No		
"Breaking the Rules"	2023	Keigo, Takumi, Máme	2023 JO1 2nd Arena Live Tour "Beyond the Dark – Rise in Kyocera Dome"	Yes	Keigo, T.K, (Note: Kawanishi is credited as T.K for his songwriting and solo works.) Máme	No		
"D.I.Y."	2024	Ren, Takumi, Hiroto	Non-album song (Note: Performed during Laposta 2024)	Yes	Ren, Hiroto	Yes	Ren, Hiroto	
"Happy Unbirthday" ‡†	2024	JO1	Be Classic	Yes	—N/a	Yes	—N/a	
"Heaven" ‡	2024	Kiyosumi (Note: Fully credited as Kiyosumi by Takumi Kawanishi)	Non-album song (Note: A coupling song to "Surge" (single edit))	Yes	—N/a	Yes	—N/a	
"Santa-san E" (サンタさんへ) #	2024	JO1	Non-album song	Yes	—N/a	Yes	Skinner Box	
"Super Star" ‡	2025	T.K	Unreleased song (Note: Performed during Kawanishi's solo concert at Laposta 2025)	Yes	—N/a	Yes	—N/a	
"Come Again" ‡#	2025	T.K	PlanJ track	Yes	—N/a	Yes	—N/a	
"Warainaki" (笑い泣き) ‡	2025	T.K	Unreleased songs	Yes	—N/a	Yes	—N/a	
"True" ‡	2025	T.K	Unreleased songs	Yes	—N/a	Yes	—N/a	
"Sekai ga Hiroi No Ka. Boku ga Chiisai No Ka" (世界が広いのか。僕が小さいのか。) ‡	2025	T.K	Unreleased songs	Yes	—N/a	Yes	—N/a	
"Bingo"	2026	Ren, Takumi	JO1nder Show 2025 "Wherever We Are" in Tokyo Dome	Yes	Ren	Yes	Ren	
"Push On" ‡	2026	Ruki, Sukai	JO1nder Show 2025 "Wherever We Are" in Tokyo Dome	Yes	—N/a	Yes	—N/a	
"Kyou mo Manten de Manten Janai" (今日も満点で満天じゃない) †	2026	Takumi Kawanishi	Sketch	Yes	—N/a	Yes	Naoki Kubo	
"Unstoppable" †	2026	Monkey Majik, Takumi Kawanishi	Frequency	Yes	Maynard, Blaise, Tax	Yes	Maynaird, Blaise	
"Heibon" (平凡)	2026	Takumi Kawanishi	Sketch	Yes	—N/a	Yes	Naoki Kubo	
"Give Me Five"	2026	Takumi Kawanishi	Sketch	Yes	—N/a	Yes	Naoki Kubo	
"Harukaze" (ハルカゼ)	2026	Takumi Kawanishi	Sketch	Yes	—N/a	Yes	Naoki Kubo	
"Zutto, Zutto, Ikite Ikemasu Youni" (ずっと、ずっと、生きていけますように)	2026	Takumi Kawanishi	Sketch	Yes	—N/a	Yes	Naoki Kubo	
"Isshoumono" (一生物)	2026	Takumi Kawanishi	Sketch	Yes	—N/a	Yes	Naoki Kubo	
"Murasakiiro" (むらさきいろ) †	2026	Máme	Non-album single	Yes	—N/a	Yes	Naoki Kubo	
"Hitotoki" (ひととき)	2026	Takumi Kawanishi	Tomorrow	Yes	—N/a	Yes	Naoki Kubo	
"Animal" †	2026	JO1	Animal	No		Yes	Dem Jointz, THE B7ANK, Alexis Boyd, Carmen Reece, Zacharie Raymond, Yannick Rastogi	
"Saigo no Ai" (最後の愛) †	2026	Takumi Kawanishi	Tomorrow	Yes	—N/a	Yes	Naoki Kubo	
"Kedo, Boku Neko Alergy" (けど、僕猫アレルギー)	2026	Takumi Kawanishi	Tomorrow	Yes	—N/a	Yes	Naoki Kubo	
"Hoshi no Baby" (星のベイビー)	2026	Takumi Kawanishi	Tomorrow	Yes	—N/a	Yes	Naoki Kubo	
"Ha Ha Ha" ‡	2026	Takumi Kawanishi	Tomorrow	Yes	—N/a	Yes	—N/a	
"Pride"	2026	Takumi Kawanishi	Tomorrow	Yes	—N/a	Yes	Naoki Kubo	

== Filmography ==
=== Film ===
List of films, with release year, role and note
Year	Title	Role	Note	Ref.
2021	Meters Away, Worlds Apart	Unnamed	Segment: "Today is A Good Day"	
2024	Buzzy Noise	Kiyosumi Umino	Lead role	
2024	Run for Money the Movie: Tokyo Mission	Tachibana Yamamoto	Lead role	

=== Television ===
List of television programs, with release year, role and note
Year	Title	Role	Note	Ref.
2019	Produce 101 Japan	Contestant	Finished 3rd	
2022	Short Program	Ichiro Imai	Lead role; anthology series	
2023	Play It Cool, Guys	Sōma Shiki	Main role	
2023	Play It Cool, Guys - Our Love Story	Sōma Shiki	Main role	
2025	Shadow Work	Yūma Araki		
2026	Political Lupin	Ginji Hanazono		

=== Music videos ===
List of music videos, showing year released, other featured artists and directors
Title	Year	Other artist(s)	Director	Ref.
"Come Again"	2025	—N/a	Afghan Ray (Hive Inc.)	
"Kyou mo Manten de Manten Janai" (今日も満点で満天じゃない)	2026	—N/a	Yuuka Eda	
"Unstoppable"	2026	Monkey Majik	Ryo Suda	
"Isshoumono" (一生物)	2026	—N/a	Sho Hatano	
"Hitotoki" (ひととき)	2026	—N/a	Afghan Ray (Hive Inc.)	
"Saigo no Ai" (最後の愛)	2026	—N/a	Rin Yabe	
