= List of Produce 101 Japan contestants =

Produce 101 Japan is a 2019 Japanese reality competition show and a spin-off of the South Korean television series Produce 101. 101 trainees, aged 16–30 years old who are not affiliated with any talent agency, will be competing to debut in an 11-member boy band, with members selected by live voting from the viewers.

== Contestants ==
The spelling of names in English is according to the official website. The Japanese contestants are presented in Western order (given name, family name), while the names of the Korean contestants are presented in Eastern order (family name, given name).

Color key

Top 11 of the week
Left the show
Eliminated in Episode 5
Eliminated in Episode 8
Eliminated in Episode 11
Eliminated in Episode 11, but saved
Eliminated in Episode 12
Final members of JO1

Region	Audition Team Name	Name	Age	Judges' Evaluation		Ranking													
Region	Audition Team Name	Name	Age	Judges' Evaluation		Ep. 1	Ep. 2	Ep. 3	Episode 5		Ep. 6	Episode 8		Ep. 9	Episode 11		Episode 12		Final
Region	Audition Team Name	Name	Age	1	2	#	#	#	#	Votes (Note: The number of votes for the eliminated trainees was not shown on-air on Episode 5.)	#	#	Votes (Note: The number of votes for the eliminated trainees was not shown on-air on Episode 8.)	#	#	Votes	#	Votes (Note: The number of votes for the eliminated trainees was not shown on-air on Episode 12.)	Final
Okayama	—N/a	Issei Mamehara (豆原 一成)	17	A	A	3	1	1	2	1,848,191	4	4	962,252	1	2	505,823	1	261,583	1
Fukuoka	UN Backers (Note: UN Backers consists of contestants who were professional back-up dancers.)	Ren Kawashiri (Note: Ren Kawashiri attended Very Merry Music School. He was a back-up dancer for SMAP, FT Island, Dreams Come True, Tomohisa Yamashita, Lead, Wanna One, and Pentagon.) 川尻 蓮	22	A	A	1	2	2	1	1,883,178	2	2	1,074,606	2	1	516,171	2	256,527	2
Hyogo	KSix	Takumi Kawanishi (川西 拓実)	20	B	A	2	3	3	3	1,771,861	1	1	1,149,244	12	6	381,845	3	252,885	3
Kyoto	UN Backers	Shosei Ohira (大平 祥生)	19	C	B	15	9	8	7	1,053,408	9	11	543,768	13	11	336,162	4	220,594	4
Shiga	Sion	Shion Tsurubo (鶴房 汐恩)	19	C	A	7	5	5	5	1,238,146	3	3	996,794	3	3	460,657	5	204,045	5
Tokyo	Hangyaku no Prince (Note: Hangyaku no Prince consists of contestants who were former singers.) 反逆のプリンス	Ruki Shiroiwa (Note: Ruki Shiroiwa was a member of the Johnny & Associates' trainee group Johnny's Jr. He was also part of the voice actor music group Tsukicro in 2017, where he portrayed and voiced the character Ruki Hibiya.) 白岩 瑠姫	22	C	B	22	20	19	16	680,592	16	13	494,924	4	4	448,795	6	194,919	6
Aichi	High-Steps	Keigo Sato (佐藤 景瑚)	21	A	A	25	19	17	12	780,055	14	16	464,326	17	15	287,083	7	186,309	7
Aichi	Shachihoko Friends (しゃちほこフレンズ)	Syoya Kimata (木全 翔也)	19	A	A	19	23	22	22	513,499	17	14	477,526	9	10	339,052	8	171,205	8
Nara	Six Packs (シックスパックス)	Junki Kono (河野 純喜)	21	B	B	16	17	18	15	752,859	10	9	661,099	11	13	300,869	9	159,057	9
Osaka	Team Sky	Sukai Kinjo (金城 碧海)	19	B	F	66	85	38	33	223,410	26	25	229,731	24	16	237,936	10	157,373	10
Okinawa	Six Packs (シックスパックス)	Sho Yonashiro (與那城 奨)	24	B	B	23	24	24	26	325,996	19	17	425,199	8	12	320,944	11	140,003	11
Saitama	Petit Men (プチメン)	Yugo Miyajima (宮島 優心)	19	B	A	18	15	10	10	835,565	12	18	414,240	25	22 (Note: Raira Sato and Yugo Miyajima were originally eliminated in Episode 11 but returned to compete in the Debut Evaluations because contestants Jeong Young-hoon and Kim Yoon-dong left the show and their rank got pushed up.)	204,145	12	Eliminated	12
Tokyo	Smile Magic	Shunya Osawa 大澤 駿弥	22	D	B	11	12	11	9	854,843	8	8	705,067	19	17	235,413	13	Eliminated	13
Fukuoka	Six Packs シックスパックス	Tomoaki Ando 安藤 誠明	23	B	B	4	4	7	11	798,477	11	10	654,176	7	7	355,660	14	Eliminated	14
Fukushima	Hangyaku no Prince 反逆のプリンス	Kosuke Honda 本田 康祐	24	B	B	47	39	33	28	303,267	13	15	477,362	15	18	229,428	15	Eliminated	15
Nara	KSix	Raira Sato 佐藤 來良	19	A	B	36	34	27	21	513,553	18	21	364,272	18	21	209,695	16	Eliminated	16
Osaka	Dancer Hico ダンサーhico	Masahiko Imanishi 今西 正彦	18	F	B	5	8	13	13	761,996	20	22	336,637	20	20	217,437	17	Eliminated	17
Shiga	Black Belt	Minato Inoue 井上 港人	20	C	B	28	32	39	36	209,582	28	30	203,852	22	14	287,656	18	Eliminated	18
Kumamoto	Kyushu Otokogumi 九州漢組	Shion Tokonami 床波 志音	19	C	B	87	65	94	35	214,846	21	19	402,418	16	19	223,259	19	Eliminated	19
Tokyo	—N/a	Jun Uehara (Note: Jun Uehara previously competed in Produce X 101 and was eliminated in the first round, placing 91st.) 上原 潤	23	C	B	6	7	12	17	650,811	22	12	519,155	5	8	354,058	20	Eliminated	20
South Korea	Hello Again (Note: Kim Hee-cheon, Kim Yoon-dong, and Jeong Young-hoon (under the stage name Ooon) were members of the South Korean boy group HALO.)	Jeong Young-hoon (Note: On December 5, 2019, Kim Yoon-dong and Jeong-Young-hoon announced that they were voluntarily leaving the show for undisclosed reasons.) チョン・ヨンフン	26	B	C	9	11	9	8	905,412	7	7	748,508	6	5	383,463	Left the show		21
South Korea	Hello Again	Kim Yoon-dong キム・ユンドン	24	A	A	13	13	6	6	1,145,844	5	6	807,141	10	9	347,621	Left the show		22
Yamanashi	Black Belt	Fumiya Sano 佐野 文哉	22	B	B	94	57	79	57	157,943	37	34	175,673	21	23	203,197	Eliminated		23
Hyogo	Petit Men プチメン	Koshin Komatsu 小松 倖真	18	D	D	21	21	23	23	477,851	29	31	180,413	28	24	185,385	Eliminated		24
Saitama	Team DK	Ryuji Sato 佐藤 隆士	19	C	C	35	31	35	56	169,961	36	33	176,035	27	25	184,001	Eliminated		25
Miyazaki	Team DK	Reito Kitagawa 北川 玲叶	17	D	F	20	18	20	24	461,920	23	23	269,711	23	26	148,527	Eliminated		26
Mie	KSix	Kanta Migakida 磨田 寛大	20	F	F	24	26	29	41	206,392	41	26	225,718	26	27	129,462	Eliminated		27
Okinawa	Ryukyu Boys 琉球BOYS	Tatsutoshi Miyazato 宮里 龍斗志	21	B	B	32	28	25	25	374,466	24	27	224,857	29	28	118,118	Eliminated		28
Tokyo	Team Breakin'	Masanami Aoki 青木 聖波	18	B	D	14	14	15	14	754,940	15	20	365,955	30	29	108,388	Eliminated		29
Okinawa	Ryukyu Boys 琉球BOYS	Sho Fukuchi 福地 正	26	F	C	50	60	67	59	157,298	27	32	176,636	31	30	89,361	Eliminated		30
Fukuoka	Kyushu Otokogumi 九州漢組	Naoki Ozawa 男澤 直樹	20	B	B	58	69	75	27	313,583	25	24	231,106	32	31	69,937	Eliminated		31
Osaka	KSix	Taiga Nakamoto 中本 大賀	18	D	C	61	36	30	29	271,957	31	29	204,423	33	32	64,952	Eliminated		32
Saitama	Triforce トライフォース	Kaito Okano 岡野 海斗	18	C	D	54	82	82	50	178,283	30	28	207,937	35	33	54,202	Eliminated		33
Kanagawa	Hangyaku no Prince 反逆のプリンス	Shuta Urano (Note: Shuta Urano was a member of the Johnny & Associates' trainee group Johnny's Jr., where he was assigned to the sub-unit Blow.) 浦野 秀太	22	C	C	81	72	96	49	179,023	57	35	164,879	34	34	38,000	Eliminated		34
South Korea	Hello Again	Kim Hee-cheon (Note: On November 28, 2019, Kim Hee-cheon dropped out of the show due to personal reasons.) キム・ヒチョン	25	A	A	10	6	4	4	1,411,741	6	5	823,022	14	Left the show				35
Osaka	Team DK	Hiroto Ikumi 井汲 大翔	17	C	D	12	16	16	19	565,892	33	36	Eliminated						36
Chiba	Rebornz (Note: Rebornz consists of contestants who are former child actors.)	Tsubasa Takizawa (Note: Tsubasa Takizawa was a regular on the children's variety show Let's Tensai no TV-kun and appeared in the movie Kamen Rider Wizard in Magic Land.) 瀧澤 翼	16	B	D	29	29	31	37	209,445	35	37	Eliminated						37
Osaka	KSix	Hikaru Kitagawa 北川 暉	20	D	D	39	37	41	39	206,878	47	38	Eliminated						38
Nagasaki	Team Sky	Sora Nakazato 中里 空	17	C	B	85	98	37	42	205,590	32	39	Eliminated						39
Kanagawa	Athlete Boys アスリートBOYS	Kei Terashi 寺師 敬	23	B	F	30	35	42	55	170,218	40	40	Eliminated						40
Tokyo	Hangyaku no Prince 反逆のプリンス	Ryo Mitsui 三井 瞭	22	B	D	17	22	26	30	266,289	34	41	Eliminated						41
South Korea/ Ibaraki	Beauty 4 ビューティー4	Lee Min-hyuk (Note: Lee Min-hyuk achieved fame as a YouTuber under the name "Hyuk", with over 290,000 subscribers before his retirement.) イ・ミンヒョク	28	B	D	8	10	14	20	525,979	38	42	Eliminated						42
Osaka	Smile Magic	Ryuta Hayashi 林 龍太	23	A	A	40	25	21	18	629,359	49	43	Eliminated						43
Tokyo	Team DK	Akihito Furuya 古屋 亮人	18	D	D	76	73	88	60	156,742	44	44	Eliminated						44
Ishikawa	Killer-Smile (Note: Killer-Smile consists of contestants who are former models or have entered modeling contests before.)	Kyo Yamada 山田 恭	18	B	C	72	62	54	58	157,564	39	45	Eliminated						45
Miyagi	DDD	Mao Sasaki 佐々木 真生	18	D	B	70	74	50	34	222,871	45	46	Eliminated						46
Yamagata	Athlete Boys アスリートBOYS	Yu Ando 安藤 優	20	F	C	37	40	40	40	206,479	42	47	Eliminated						47
Osaka	Dreamland ドリームランド	Kento Kitaoka 北岡 謙人	19	C	B	34	33	28	32	238,778	43	48	Eliminated						48
Okinawa	Ryukyu Boys 琉球BOYS	Masaki Ageda 安慶田 真樹	21	D	F	65	79	90	47	180,707	51	49	Eliminated						49
Aichi	Smile Magic	Ryuto Iwasaki 岩崎 琉斗	18	D	F	42	43	46	45	189,582	46	50	Eliminated						50
Tokyo	Killer-Smile	Ryono Kusachi 草地 稜之	21	B	F	49	44	34	31	241,094	48	51	Eliminated						51
Osaka	High-Steps	Ryunosuke Nakano 中野 龍之介	20	B	F	63	50	45	38	208,013	52	52	Eliminated						52
Hokkaido	DDD	Koki Nishio 西尾 航暉	20	F	F	43	68	91	52	174,629	53	53	Eliminated						53
Aichi	Team Breakin'	Takehiro Okada 岡田 武大	19	C	C	27	27	32	43	203,684	50	54	Eliminated						54
Osaka	Athlete Boys アスリートBOYS	Toi Nakabayashi 中林 登生	21	D	D	89	58	93	44	190,407	55	55	Eliminated						55
Tokyo	18X↑ イチハチエックス	Ryusei Watanabe 渡辺 龍星	22	B	D	83	78	95	48	179,353	56	56	Eliminated						56
Osaka	Beauty 4 ビューティー4	Hyuga Nakatani 中谷 日向	20	F	D	44	75	89	53	173,896	54	57	Eliminated						57
Tokyo	18X↑ イチハチエックス	Shuto Uchida 内田 脩斗	20	D	D	79	77	92	46	183,098	60	58	Eliminated						58
Hyogo	Triforce トライフォース	Miyabi Suzuki 鈴木 雅	23	B	F	86	80	97	54	171,732	59	59	Eliminated						59
Osaka	Beauty 4 ビューティー4	Yushi Katagami 片上 勇士	22	F	F	46	70	98	51	177,865	58	60	Eliminated						60
Tokyo	Killer-Smile	Kazuma Koga 古賀 一馬	22	D	D	26	30	36	61	Eliminated									61
Fukuoka	Boyz III Men	Ginsuke Nakagawa 中川 吟亮	20	F	F	33	45	62	62	Eliminated									62
Hyogo	Team Rapper Crew	Katsunari Nakagawa 中川 勝就	22	C	B	51	64	61	63	Eliminated									63
Nagasaki	Kyushu Otokogumi 九州漢組	Rikuto Omizu 大水 陸渡	20	B	F	48	53	63	64	Eliminated									64
Ibaraki	Team DK	Keiya Taguchi 田口 馨也	16	C	D	78	38	44	65	Eliminated									65
Aichi	Shachihoko Friends しゃちほこフレンズ	Ryotaro Nishi 西 涼太郎	19	B	D	64	67	64	66	Eliminated									66
Tokyo	Triforce トライフォース	Akira Takano 高野 慧	19	D	D	31	42	59	67	Eliminated									67
Tokyo	Athlete Boys アスリートBOYS	Tomoya Nishino 西野 友也	22	D	F	67	97	51	68	Eliminated									68
Tokyo	Dreamland ドリームランド	Ryusei Kurokawa 黒川 竜聖	19	F	F	55	89	47	69	Eliminated									69
Tokyo	High-Steps	Hayato Isohata 五十畑 颯斗	26	B	D	38	47	65	70	Eliminated									70
Japan/ Philippines	Junshin 純真	Takeru Gutierez グチェレス タケル	17	D	C	45	41	49	71	Eliminated									71
Fukuoka	Boyz III Men	Kazuki Nishiyama 西山 和貴	24	B	C	88	71	60	72	Eliminated									72
Gunma	Killer-Smile	Yuki Ishii (Note: Yuki Ishii is a former actor who first appeared in the Ensemble Stars! stage plays as Kanata Shinkai.) 石井 祐輝	21	C	D	68	90	48	73	Eliminated									73
Kanagawa	Team Rapper Crew	Hikari Inayoshi 稲吉 ひかり	19	B	C	60	76	77	74	Eliminated									74
Hiroshima	—N/a	Taichi Kihara 木原 汰一	21	B	F	95	46	43	75	Eliminated									75
Saitama	High-Steps	Yuya Tanaka 田中 雄也	21	B	D	75	88	73	76	Eliminated									76
Canada	Junshin 純真	Eujin Aljama アルジャマ 勇心	18	C	F	69	63	69	77	Eliminated									77
Osaka	Rebornz	Reiya Okawa 大川 澪哉	19	B	B	59	66	68	78	Eliminated									78
Miyazaki	To-Go	Yoshiki Togo 東郷 良樹	24	B	D	41	61	66	79	Eliminated									79
Yamagata	Athlete Boys アスリートBOYS	Tatsuki Yuki 結城 樹	22	D	D	71	93	55	80	Eliminated									80
Tokyo	Petit Men プチメン	Kenta Yamamoto 山本 健太	16	D	C	93	56	87	81	Eliminated									81
Osaka	Rebornz	Gen Suzuki 鈴木 玄	18	B	C	56	81	71	82	Eliminated									82
Hokkaido	DDD	Masahiro Kanno 菅野 雅浩	19	C	B	62	83	72	83	Eliminated									83
Shizuoka	Athlete Boys アスリートBOYS	Shinjun Suzuki 鈴木 晨順	20	F	B	96	55	86	84	Eliminated									84
Kanagawa	UN Backers	Satoshi Yamada 山田 聡	21	D	F	92	48	80	85	Eliminated									85
Australia	팬팬 (Pen Pen) ペンペン	Kengo Hata 秦 健豪	18	B	B	82	91	58	86	Eliminated									86
Miyazaki	Watanabe Kyōdai 渡邊兄弟	Taiki Watanabe 渡邊 大貴	21	D	C	77	94	53	87	Eliminated									87
Nara	Beauty 4 ビューティー4	Naoki Nakanishi 中西 直樹	21	B	C	98	54	83	88	Eliminated									88
Kyoto	Boyz III Men	Reo Hasegawa 長谷川 怜央	21	F	F	74	92	52	89	Eliminated									89
Osaka	KSix	Shinjiro Mori 森 慎二郎	19	F	F	53	51	76	90	Eliminated									90
Osaka	18X↑ イチハチエックス	Shohei Yonehara 米原 尚平	23	F	D	84	84	74	91	Eliminated									91
Hyogo	Athlete Boys アスリートBOYS	Masayoshi Ikemoto 池本 正義	17	C	C	91	49	78	92	Eliminated									92
Osaka	Keiō Boys 慶應BOYS	Yuki Komajaku 駒尺 雄樹	19	F	D	52	95	57	93	Eliminated									93
Miyazaki	Watanabe Kyōdai 渡邊兄弟	Koki Watanabe 渡邊 公貴	21	D	D	80	96	56	94	Eliminated									94
Hokkaido	Keiō Boys 慶應BOYS	Haruka Matsukura 松倉 悠	23	F	F	97	52	84	95	Eliminated									95
Ibaraki	18X↑ イチハチエックス	Kentaro Ishii 石井 健太郎	22	F	F	57	87	70	96	Eliminated									96
Fukushima	팬팬 (Pen Pen) ペンペン	Fumiya Kumazawa 熊澤 歩哉	22	B	F	73	86	85	97	Eliminated									97
Hyogo	Black Belt	Shogo Koyama 小山 省吾	19	F	B	90	59	81	Left the show										98
Tokyo	Killer-Smile	Kenya Hata 畑 顕矢	23	D	C	Left the show													—N/a
—N/a	Kyushu Otokogumi 九州漢組	Kazuto Sato (Note: Kazuto Sato and Yuki Katayama left the show before the first episode aired.) 佐藤 一翔	20	C	—N/a	Left the show													—N/a
—N/a	—N/a	Yuki Katayama (片山 湧貴)	—N/a	—N/a	—N/a	Left the show													—N/a

== Position Battle Evaluation Performances (Episodes 3–4) ==
Color key

- Winner
- Leader
- Center
- Leader and center

Bold denotes the person who picked the team members. Each person, selected via lottery, chose a song of his choice with a maximum of twelve people per song. Afterwards, the highest-ranking member of each group chose five people to be on his team, while the remaining members become their opposing team. There was nobody who chose "Tamashii Revolution" first, so Ryuji Sato was selected to pick the team members.

Performance				Team		Contestant			Ranking				
#	Position	Artist	Song	#	Votes	Name	Votes	Votes with bonus	Song	Vocal	Dance	Rap	Rank
1	Dance	BTS	"DNA (Japanese ver.)"	1 DTSS	270	Shogo Koyama	12	1,012	12		22		50
1	Dance	BTS	"DNA (Japanese ver.)"	1 DTSS	270	Yoshiki Togo	47	1,047	7		17		38
1	Dance	BTS	"DNA (Japanese ver.)"	1 DTSS	270	Kim Youn-dong	95	1,095	3		7		15
1	Dance	BTS	"DNA (Japanese ver.)"	1 DTSS	270	**Issei Mamehara**	68	1,068	6		13		27
1	Dance	BTS	"DNA (Japanese ver.)"	1 DTSS	270	Takumi Kawanishi	93	1,093	4		8		16
1	Dance	BTS	"DNA (Japanese ver.)"	1 DTSS	270	Kim Hee-cheon	76	1,076	5		11		23
1	Dance	BTS	"DNA (Japanese ver.)"	2 GPS	119	Keigo Sato	141	3,141	1		4		9
1	Dance	BTS	"DNA (Japanese ver.)"	2 GPS	119	Mao Sasaki	36	36	9		41		85
1	Dance	BTS	"DNA (Japanese ver.)"	2 GPS	119	Shion Tsurubo	114	114	2		28		57
1	Dance	BTS	"DNA (Japanese ver.)"	2 GPS	119	Hayato Isohata	43	43	8		39		79
1	Dance	BTS	"DNA (Japanese ver.)"	2 GPS	119	Koki Watanabe	23	23	11		45		93
1	Dance	BTS	"DNA (Japanese ver.)"	2 GPS	119	Shuto Uchida	26	26	10		44		92
2	Vocal	One OK Rock	"Wherever You Are"	1 One Pick Rock	310	Lee Min-hyuk	42	1,042	7	19			41
2	Vocal	One OK Rock	"Wherever You Are"	1 One Pick Rock	310	Junki Kono	54	1,054	5	15			35
2	Vocal	One OK Rock	"Wherever You Are"	1 One Pick Rock	310	**Ryuta Hayashi**	44	1,044	6	18			40
2	Vocal	One OK Rock	"Wherever You Are"	1 One Pick Rock	310	Naoki Nakanishi	16	1,016	10	22			47
2	Vocal	One OK Rock	"Wherever You Are"	1 One Pick Rock	310	Naoki Ozawa	224	14,224	1	1			2
2	Vocal	One OK Rock	"Wherever You Are"	2 Make You Smile	75	Ginsuke Nakagawa	112	113	2	25			58
2	Vocal	One OK Rock	"Wherever You Are"	2 Make You Smile	75	Raira Sato	82	82	4	28			63
2	Vocal	One OK Rock	"Wherever You Are"	2 Make You Smile	75	Kei Terashi	31	31	9	39			89
2	Vocal	One OK Rock	"Wherever You Are"	2 Make You Smile	75	Tomoya Nishino	110	110	3	26			59
2	Vocal	One OK Rock	"Wherever You Are"	2 Make You Smile	75	Shinjun Suzuki	39	39	8	35			83
3	Dance	Exile The Second	"Wild Wild Wild"	1 The First (ザ・ファースト)	70	Hikaru Kitagawa	70	70	5		31		65
3	Dance	Exile The Second	"Wild Wild Wild"	1 The First (ザ・ファースト)	70	Minato Inoue	61	61	6		33		68
3	Dance	Exile The Second	"Wild Wild Wild"	1 The First (ザ・ファースト)	70	Yuya Tanaka	56	56	8		34		69
3	Dance	Exile The Second	"Wild Wild Wild"	1 The First (ザ・ファースト)	70	Kyo Yamada	40	40	10		40		81
3	Dance	Exile The Second	"Wild Wild Wild"	1 The First (ザ・ファースト)	70	Shunya Osawa	103	103	3		29		60
3	Dance	Exile The Second	"Wild Wild Wild"	1 The First (ザ・ファースト)	70	**Masayoshi Ikemoto**	50	50	9		38		76
3	Dance	Exile The Second	"Wild Wild Wild"	2 Lions (獅子)	321	Satoshi Yamada	6	1,006	11		25		53
3	Dance	Exile The Second	"Wild Wild Wild"	2 Lions (獅子)	321	Taiki Watanabe	5	1,005	12		26		54
3	Dance	Exile The Second	"Wild Wild Wild"	2 Lions (獅子)	321	Masanami Aoki	117	1,117	2		6		13
3	Dance	Exile The Second	"Wild Wild Wild"	2 Lions (獅子)	321	Masahiko Imanishi	120	4,120	1		2		5
3	Dance	Exile The Second	"Wild Wild Wild"	2 Lions (獅子)	321	Yu Ando	78	1,078	4		10		22
3	Dance	Exile The Second	"Wild Wild Wild"	2 Lions (獅子)	321	Ryunosuke Nakano	58	1,058	7		15		33
4	Vocal	Kenshi Yonezu	"Lemon"	1 Revol	301	Taiga Nakamoto	125	1,125	3	5			12
4	Vocal	Kenshi Yonezu	"Lemon"	1 Revol	301	**Rikuto Omizu**	66	1,066	5	12			28
4	Vocal	Kenshi Yonezu	"Lemon"	1 Revol	301	Kengo Hata	34	1,034	8	20			42
4	Vocal	Kenshi Yonezu	"Lemon"	1 Revol	301	Tatsuki Yuki	16	1,016	10	22			47
4	Vocal	Kenshi Yonezu	"Lemon"	1 Revol	301	Sho Yonashiro	151	4,151	1	2			4
4	Vocal	Kenshi Yonezu	"Lemon"	2 Rise	91	Ryusei Watanabe	31	31	9	40			89
4	Vocal	Kenshi Yonezu	"Lemon"	2 Rise	91	Yushi Katagami	41	41	7	34			80
4	Vocal	Kenshi Yonezu	"Lemon"	2 Rise	91	Reo Hasegawa	87	87	4	27			62
4	Vocal	Kenshi Yonezu	"Lemon"	2 Rise	91	Shohei Yonehara	66	66	5	29			66
4	Vocal	Kenshi Yonezu	"Lemon"	2 Rise	91	Masahiro Kanno	127	127	2	24			56
5	Dance	Hey! Say! JUMP	"Over the Top"	1 National Producers' Cheeks (国プちゃんのほっぺ)	143	Jeong Young-hoon	139	139	2		27		55
5	Dance	Hey! Say! JUMP	"Over the Top"	1 National Producers' Cheeks (国プちゃんのほっぺ)	143	Hyuga Nakatani	53	53	6		37		72
5	Dance	Hey! Say! JUMP	"Over the Top"	1 National Producers' Cheeks (国プちゃんのほっぺ)	143	**Hiroto Ikumi**	36	36	7		41		85
5	Dance	Hey! Say! JUMP	"Over the Top"	1 National Producers' Cheeks (国プちゃんのほっぺ)	143	Koshin Komatsu	56	56	5		34		69
5	Dance	Hey! Say! JUMP	"Over the Top"	1 National Producers' Cheeks (国プちゃんのほっぺ)	143	Reito Kitagawa	66	66	3		32		66
5	Dance	Hey! Say! JUMP	"Over the Top"	1 National Producers' Cheeks (国プちゃんのほっぺ)	143	Reiya Okawa	20	20	10		46		94
5	Dance	Hey! Say! JUMP	"Over the Top"	2 Reiwa Jump (令和JUMP)	244	Kosuke Honda	230	14,230	1		1		1
5	Dance	Hey! Say! JUMP	"Over the Top"	2 Reiwa Jump (令和JUMP)	244	Ryono Kusachi	33	1,033	8		18		43
5	Dance	Hey! Say! JUMP	"Over the Top"	2 Reiwa Jump (令和JUMP)	244	Koki Nishio	7	1,007	12		22		52
5	Dance	Hey! Say! JUMP	"Over the Top"	2 Reiwa Jump (令和JUMP)	244	Ruki Shiroiwa	59	1,059	4		14		31
5	Dance	Hey! Say! JUMP	"Over the Top"	2 Reiwa Jump (令和JUMP)	244	Ryusei Kurokawa	33	1,033	8		18		43
5	Dance	Hey! Say! JUMP	"Over the Top"	2 Reiwa Jump (令和JUMP)	244	Fumiya Kumazawa	16	1,016	11		21		47
6	Vocal	Superfly	"Tamashii Revolution"	1 Soul Voice	358	Sukai Kinjo	46	1,046	6	17			39
6	Vocal	Superfly	"Tamashii Revolution"	1 Soul Voice	358	Eujin Aljama	26	1,026	11	21			45
6	Vocal	Superfly	"Tamashii Revolution"	1 Soul Voice	358	Tatsutoshi Miyazato	69	1,069	4	11			25
6	Vocal	Superfly	"Tamashii Revolution"	1 Soul Voice	358	Tomoaki Ando	92	1,092	2	7			17
6	Vocal	Superfly	"Tamashii Revolution"	1 Soul Voice	358	**Ryuji Sato**	62	1,062	5	13			29
6	Vocal	Superfly	"Tamashii Revolution"	1 Soul Voice	358	Gen Suzuki	88	1,088	3	8			19
6	Vocal	Superfly	"Tamashii Revolution"	2 Neo 6	35	Tsubasa Takizawa	167	3,167	1	4			8
6	Vocal	Superfly	"Tamashii Revolution"	2 Neo 6	35	Kazuma Koga	44	44	7	32			77
6	Vocal	Superfly	"Tamashii Revolution"	2 Neo 6	35	Takehiro Okada	44	44	7	32			77
6	Vocal	Superfly	"Tamashii Revolution"	2 Neo 6	35	Akira Takano	19	19	12	41			95
6	Vocal	Superfly	"Tamashii Revolution"	2 Neo 6	35	Kentaro Ishii	38	38	9	36			84
6	Vocal	Superfly	"Tamashii Revolution"	2 Neo 6	35	Haruka Matsukura	34	34	10	38			88
7	Rap	Produce 101 Japan	101 Original Rap	1	308	Katsunari Nakagawa	54	1,054	6			5	35
7	Rap	Produce 101 Japan	101 Original Rap	1	308	Hikari Inayoshi	59	1,059	5			4	31
7	Rap	Produce 101 Japan	101 Original Rap	1	308	Jun Uehara	175	1,175	2			2	10
7	Rap	Produce 101 Japan	101 Original Rap	1	308	**Kaito Okano**	84	1,084	3			3	20
7	Rap	Produce 101 Japan	101 Original Rap	2 Pick Me-in (ピックミン)	76	Ryo Mitsui	185	13,185	1			1	3
7	Rap	Produce 101 Japan	101 Original Rap	2 Pick Me-in (ピックミン)	76	Shinjiro Mori	51	51	7			7	75
7	Rap	Produce 101 Japan	101 Original Rap	2 Pick Me-in (ピックミン)	76	Miyabi Suzuki	40	40	8			8	81
7	Rap	Produce 101 Japan	101 Original Rap	2 Pick Me-in (ピックミン)	76	Kenta Yamamoto	80	80	4			6	64
8	Vocal	Back Number	"Happy Birthday"	1 Who Happy	87	Taichi Kihara	35	35	9	37			87
8	Vocal	Back Number	"Happy Birthday"	1 Who Happy	87	Takeru Gutierez	53	53	7	30			72
8	Vocal	Back Number	"Happy Birthday"	1 Who Happy	87	Shion Tokonami	217	3,217	1	3			6
8	Vocal	Back Number	"Happy Birthday"	1 Who Happy	87	Kento Kitaoka	52	52	8	31			74
8	Vocal	Back Number	"Happy Birthday"	1 Who Happy	87	**Yuki Ishii**	19	19	10	41			95
8	Vocal	Back Number	"Happy Birthday"	2 Happy Set	301	Kazuki Nishiyama	61	1,061	5	14			30
8	Vocal	Back Number	"Happy Birthday"	2 Happy Set	301	Kanta Migakida	54	1,054	6	15			35
8	Vocal	Back Number	"Happy Birthday"	2 Happy Set	301	Ryuto Iwasaki	73	1,073	4	10			24
8	Vocal	Back Number	"Happy Birthday"	2 Happy Set	301	Shuta Urano	81	1,081	3	9			21
8	Vocal	Back Number	"Happy Birthday"	2 Happy Set	301	Masaki Ageda	102	1,102	2	6			14
9	Dance	Seventeen	"Highlight"	1 Your Light	317	Syoya Kimata	89	1,089	4		9		18
9	Dance	Seventeen	"Highlight"	1 Your Light	317	Toi Nakabayashi	18	1,018	9		20		46
9	Dance	Seventeen	"Highlight"	1 Your Light	317	**Ren Kawashiri**	138	1,138	2		5		11
9	Dance	Seventeen	"Highlight"	1 Your Light	317	Yugo Miyajima	69	1,069	5		12		25
9	Dance	Seventeen	"Highlight"	1 Your Light	317	Sora Nakazato	9	1,009	12		23		51
9	Dance	Seventeen	"Highlight"	1 Your Light	317	Shosei Ohira	56	1,056	6		16		34
9	Dance	Seventeen	"Highlight"	2 Nineteen	72	Keiya Taguchi	30	30	8		43		91
9	Dance	Seventeen	"Highlight"	2 Nineteen	72	Akihito Furuya	92	92	3		30		61
9	Dance	Seventeen	"Highlight"	2 Nineteen	72	Ryotaro Nishi	10	10	11		48		98
9	Dance	Seventeen	"Highlight"	2 Nineteen	72	Yuki Komajaku	15	15	10		47		97
9	Dance	Seventeen	"Highlight"	2 Nineteen	72	Fumiya Sano	55	55	7		36		71
9	Dance	Seventeen	"Highlight"	2 Nineteen	72	Sho Fukuchi	178	3,178	1		3		7

== Group Battle Evaluation Performances (Episodes 6–7) ==
Color key

- Winner
- Leader
- Center
- Leader and center

Bold denotes the person who chose the team members, with priority given to higher-ranked trainees. Ren Kawashiri was ranked #1 during the first eliminations and chose his team first. The remaining trainees were only allowed to pick four people, and the nine trainees left over were each allowed to pick the team of their choice. Songs were chosen through a medley race consisting of a cargo net crawl, disentanglement puzzle, and balloon popping. The individual winner of each group gets a 20,000 point bonus, the overall individual winner gets a 50,000 point bonus, and the overall group winners get a 100,000 point bonus.

Performance			Team		Contestant					
#	Artist	Song	#	Votes	Position	Name	Team	Votes	Votes with bonus	Rank
1	Exo	"Love Me Right (Japanese ver.)"	7 Dimples (えくぼ)	1771	Main Vocal	Sora Nakazato	5	249		47
1	Exo	"Love Me Right (Japanese ver.)"	7 Dimples (えくぼ)	1771	Sub Vocal 1	Keigo Sato	3	338		24
1	Exo	"Love Me Right (Japanese ver.)"	7 Dimples (えくぼ)	1771	Sub Vocal 2	Taiga Nakamoto	4	271		43
1	Exo	"Love Me Right (Japanese ver.)"	7 Dimples (えくぼ)	1771	Sub Vocal 3	Syoya Kimata	1	367	20,367	10
1	Exo	"Love Me Right (Japanese ver.)"	7 Dimples (えくぼ)	1771	Rapper 1	**Yugo Miyajima**	2	342		23
1	Exo	"Love Me Right (Japanese ver.)"	7 Dimples (えくぼ)	1771	Rapper 2	Takehiro Okada	6	204		55
2	Da Pump	"If..."	6 Petit Pump (ぷち☆ぱんぷ)	1789	Main Vocal	Shion Tokonami	1	402	20,402	9
2	Da Pump	"If..."	6 Petit Pump (ぷち☆ぱんぷ)	1789	Sub Vocal 1	Hikaru Kitagawa	3	305		33
2	Da Pump	"If..."	6 Petit Pump (ぷち☆ぱんぷ)	1789	Sub Vocal 2	Koki Nishio	6	170		56
2	Da Pump	"If..."	6 Petit Pump (ぷち☆ぱんぷ)	1789	Sub Vocal 3	Sho Fukuchi	4	292		37
2	Da Pump	"If..."	6 Petit Pump (ぷち☆ぱんぷ)	1789	Rapper 1	Kaito Okano	2	336		26
2	Da Pump	"If..."	6 Petit Pump (ぷち☆ぱんぷ)	1789	Rapper 2	**Masanami Aoki**	5	284		39
3	BTS	"Fire (Japanese ver.)"	2	2136	Main Vocal	Junki Kono	5	349		21
3	BTS	"Fire (Japanese ver.)"	2	2136	Main Rapper	Kim Youn-dong	3	377		19
3	BTS	"Fire (Japanese ver.)"	2	2136	Sub Vocal 1	Jeong Young-hoon	4	359		20
3	BTS	"Fire (Japanese ver.)"	2	2136	Sub Vocal 2	**Issei Mamehara**	1	407	20,407	7
3	BTS	"Fire (Japanese ver.)"	2	2136	Sub Rapper 1	Shion Tsurubo	2	400		17
3	BTS	"Fire (Japanese ver.)"	2	2136	Sub Rapper 2	Kanta Migakida	6	244		49
4	Daichi Miura	"(Re)play"	4 Friendly Brothers (仲良し兄弟)	1879	Main Vocal	Naoki Ozawa	2	344		22
4	Daichi Miura	"(Re)play"	4 Friendly Brothers (仲良し兄弟)	1879	Sub Vocal 1	Raira Sato	4	316		30
4	Daichi Miura	"(Re)play"	4 Friendly Brothers (仲良し兄弟)	1879	Sub Vocal 2	Minato Inoue	5	292		37
4	Daichi Miura	"(Re)play"	4 Friendly Brothers (仲良し兄弟)	1879	Sub Vocal 3	Masaki Ageda	6	246		48
4	Daichi Miura	"(Re)play"	4 Friendly Brothers (仲良し兄弟)	1879	Sub Vocal 4	Kosuke Honda	1	360	20,360	11
4	Daichi Miura	"(Re)play"	4 Friendly Brothers (仲良し兄弟)	1879	Sub Vocal 5	**Shosei Ohira**	3	321		29
5	Blackpink	"Ddu-Du Ddu-Du (Japanese ver.)"	8 Whitepink	1544	Main Vocal	Yushi Katagami	6	139		59
5	Blackpink	"Ddu-Du Ddu-Du (Japanese ver.)"	8 Whitepink	1544	Sub Vocal 1	**Reito Kitagawa**	1	337	20,337	13
5	Blackpink	"Ddu-Du Ddu-Du (Japanese ver.)"	8 Whitepink	1544	Sub Vocal 2	Akihito Furuya	2	297		36
5	Blackpink	"Ddu-Du Ddu-Du (Japanese ver.)"	8 Whitepink	1544	Main Rapper	Miyabi Suzuki	3	277		40
5	Blackpink	"Ddu-Du Ddu-Du (Japanese ver.)"	8 Whitepink	1544	Sub Rapper 1	Ryuto Iwasaki	5	220		53
5	Blackpink	"Ddu-Du Ddu-Du (Japanese ver.)"	8 Whitepink	1544	Sub Rapper 2	Ryunosuke Nakano	2	274		42
6	AAA	"Wake Up!"	10; Six Piece	1411	Main Vocal	**Tatsutoshi Miyazato**	2	305		33
6	AAA	"Wake Up!"	10; Six Piece	1411	Sub Vocal 1	Hyuga Nakatani	4	226		52
6	AAA	"Wake Up!"	10; Six Piece	1411	Sub Vocal 2	Sukai Kinjo	1	311	20,311	15
6	AAA	"Wake Up!"	10; Six Piece	1411	Sub Vocal 3	Ryusei Watanabe	5	167		57
6	AAA	"Wake Up!"	10; Six Piece	1411	Rapper 1	Yu Ando	3	259		45
6	AAA	"Wake Up!"	10; Six Piece	1411	Rapper 2	Ryono Kusachi	6	143		58
7	TVXQ	"Why? (Keep Your Head Down)"	3 Wh-Wh-Wh-Wh-Why? Team (わわわわワイチーム)	2120	Main Vocal	**Tomoaki Ando**	2	400		16
7	TVXQ	"Why? (Keep Your Head Down)"	3 Wh-Wh-Wh-Wh-Why? Team (わわわわワイチーム)	2120	Sub Vocal 1	Sho Yonashiro	1	407	20,407	7
7	TVXQ	"Why? (Keep Your Head Down)"	3 Wh-Wh-Wh-Wh-Why? Team (わわわわワイチーム)	2120	Sub Vocal 2	Fumiya Sano	4	337		25
7	TVXQ	"Why? (Keep Your Head Down)"	3 Wh-Wh-Wh-Wh-Why? Team (わわわわワイチーム)	2120	Sub Vocal 3	Ruki Shiroiwa	3	381		18
7	TVXQ	"Why? (Keep Your Head Down)"	3 Wh-Wh-Wh-Wh-Why? Team (わわわわワイチーム)	2120	Rapper 1	Shuto Uchida	6	259		45
7	TVXQ	"Why? (Keep Your Head Down)"	3 Wh-Wh-Wh-Wh-Why? Team (わわわわワイチーム)	2120	Rapper 2	Masahiko Imanishi	5	332		27
8	Arashi	"Happiness"	5 Pappy (パッピー)	1861	Main Vocal	**Ryuta Hayashi**	4	312		32
8	Arashi	"Happiness"	5 Pappy (パッピー)	1861	Sub Vocal 1	Kei Terashi	1	336	20,336	14
8	Arashi	"Happiness"	5 Pappy (パッピー)	1861	Sub Vocal 2	Kyo Yamada	2	327		28
8	Arashi	"Happiness"	5 Pappy (パッピー)	1861	Sub Vocal 3	Koshin Komatsu	3	315		31
8	Arashi	"Happiness"	5 Pappy (パッピー)	1861	Sub Vocal 4	Ryo Mitsui	6	271		43
8	Arashi	"Happiness"	5 Pappy (パッピー)	1861	Sub Vocal 5	Tsubasa Takizawa	5	300		35
9	Shinee	"Everybody (Japanese ver.)"	9 Kachitainee (lit. We Want to Win-ee)	1416	Main Vocal	Mao Sasaki	4	238		51
9	Shinee	"Everybody (Japanese ver.)"	9 Kachitainee (lit. We Want to Win-ee)	1416	Sub Vocal 1	Lee Min-hyuk	6	89		60
9	Shinee	"Everybody (Japanese ver.)"	9 Kachitainee (lit. We Want to Win-ee)	1416	Sub Vocal 2	Toi Nakabayashi	5	213		54
9	Shinee	"Everybody (Japanese ver.)"	9 Kachitainee (lit. We Want to Win-ee)	1416	Sub Vocal 3	Kento Kitaoka	3	242		50
9	Shinee	"Everybody (Japanese ver.)"	9 Kachitainee (lit. We Want to Win-ee)	1416	Rapper 1	Ryuji Sato	1	357	20,357	12
9	Shinee	"Everybody (Japanese ver.)"	9 Kachitainee (lit. We Want to Win-ee)	1416	Rapper 2	**Hiroto Ikumi**	2	277		40
10	Sandaime J Soul Brothers	"Raise the Flag"	1 Dream Flag	2233	Main Vocal	Shuta Urano	4	372	100,372	4
10	Sandaime J Soul Brothers	"Raise the Flag"	1 Dream Flag	2233	Main Rapper	Jun Uehara	6	300	100,300	6
10	Sandaime J Soul Brothers	"Raise the Flag"	1 Dream Flag	2233	Sub Vocal 1	**Ren Kawashiri**	2	395	100,395	2
10	Sandaime J Soul Brothers	"Raise the Flag"	1 Dream Flag	2233	Sub Vocal 2	Takumi Kawanishi	1	419	170,419	1
10	Sandaime J Soul Brothers	"Raise the Flag"	1 Dream Flag	2233	Sub Vocal 3	Kim Hee-cheon	3	376	100,376	3
10	Sandaime J Soul Brothers	"Raise the Flag"	1 Dream Flag	2233	Sub Vocal 4	Shunya Osawa	5	371	100,371	5

== Concept Evaluation (Episode 9–10) ==
- Winner
- Leader
- Center
- Leader and center

Members of each group are selected by audience vote on their official website between the broadcasts of episodes 5 and 6 (October 24 at 11:30 PM to October 30 at 5:00 AM (JST)). After episode 8, teams with more than 7 members vote on which members will leave, while teams who have less than 7 members have the opportunity to recruit them.

Performance					Contestant				
Concept	#	Producer	Song	Votes	Position	Name	Votes	Rank	Bonus
Future Pop	1 Black Out	Jinli (Full8loom), Kanata Nakamura (lyrics); Gloryface (Full8loom), Jinli (Full8loom), Jake K (composition); Gloryface (Full8loom), Jake K (arrangement)	"Black Out"	107	Main Vocal	Tomoaki Ando	16	18	
Future Pop	1 Black Out	Jinli (Full8loom), Kanata Nakamura (lyrics); Gloryface (Full8loom), Jinli (Full8loom), Jake K (composition); Gloryface (Full8loom), Jake K (arrangement)	"Black Out"	107	Sub Vocal 1	Kim Hee-cheon	15	20	
Future Pop	1 Black Out	Jinli (Full8loom), Kanata Nakamura (lyrics); Gloryface (Full8loom), Jinli (Full8loom), Jake K (composition); Gloryface (Full8loom), Jake K (arrangement)	"Black Out"	107	Sub Vocal 2	Fumiya Sano	10	26	
Future Pop	1 Black Out	Jinli (Full8loom), Kanata Nakamura (lyrics); Gloryface (Full8loom), Jinli (Full8loom), Jake K (composition); Gloryface (Full8loom), Jake K (arrangement)	"Black Out"	107	Sub Vocal 3	Kosuke Honda	12	22	
Future Pop	1 Black Out	Jinli (Full8loom), Kanata Nakamura (lyrics); Gloryface (Full8loom), Jinli (Full8loom), Jake K (composition); Gloryface (Full8loom), Jake K (arrangement)	"Black Out"	107	Sub Vocal 4	Sho Yonashiro	21	14	
Future Pop	1 Black Out	Jinli (Full8loom), Kanata Nakamura (lyrics); Gloryface (Full8loom), Jinli (Full8loom), Jake K (composition); Gloryface (Full8loom), Jake K (arrangement)	"Black Out"	107	Rapper 1	Sukai Kinjo	22	12	
Future Pop	1 Black Out	Jinli (Full8loom), Kanata Nakamura (lyrics); Gloryface (Full8loom), Jinli (Full8loom), Jake K (composition); Gloryface (Full8loom), Jake K (arrangement)	"Black Out"	107	Rapper 2	Osawa Shunya	11	24	
Retro House	2 Babulincho (バブりんちょ)	KZ, Kanata Nakamura (lyrics); KZ, Nthonius, PUYO (composition); Nthonius (arrangement)	"Yancha Boy Yancha Girl" (やんちゃBoyやんちゃGirl)	79	Main Vocal	Koshin Komatsu	12	22	
Retro House	2 Babulincho (バブりんちょ)	KZ, Kanata Nakamura (lyrics); KZ, Nthonius, PUYO (composition); Nthonius (arrangement)	"Yancha Boy Yancha Girl" (やんちゃBoyやんちゃGirl)	79	Sub Vocal 1	Yugo Miyajima	5	30	
Retro House	2 Babulincho (バブりんちょ)	KZ, Kanata Nakamura (lyrics); KZ, Nthonius, PUYO (composition); Nthonius (arrangement)	"Yancha Boy Yancha Girl" (やんちゃBoyやんちゃGirl)	79	Sub Vocal 2	Ryuji Sato	15	20	
Retro House	2 Babulincho (バブりんちょ)	KZ, Kanata Nakamura (lyrics); KZ, Nthonius, PUYO (composition); Nthonius (arrangement)	"Yancha Boy Yancha Girl" (やんちゃBoyやんちゃGirl)	79	Sub Vocal 3	Sho Fukuchi	5	30	
Retro House	2 Babulincho (バブりんちょ)	KZ, Kanata Nakamura (lyrics); KZ, Nthonius, PUYO (composition); Nthonius (arrangement)	"Yancha Boy Yancha Girl" (やんちゃBoyやんちゃGirl)	79	Sub Vocal 4	Shosei Ohira	30	10	
Retro House	2 Babulincho (バブりんちょ)	KZ, Kanata Nakamura (lyrics); KZ, Nthonius, PUYO (composition); Nthonius (arrangement)	"Yancha Boy Yancha Girl" (やんちゃBoyやんちゃGirl)	79	Rapper 1	Reito Kitagawa	9	27	
Retro House	2 Babulincho (バブりんちょ)	KZ, Kanata Nakamura (lyrics); KZ, Nthonius, PUYO (composition); Nthonius (arrangement)	"Yancha Boy Yancha Girl" (やんちゃBoyやんちゃGirl)	79	Rapper 2	Masahiko Imanishi	3	33	
Future Bass	3 DoReMiFaSoLaSiDomino	Kanata Nakamura (lyrics); Choi Hyun Joon, Kim Seung Soo (composition & arrangement)	"Domino"	129	Main Vocal	Junki Kono	5	30	
Future Bass	3 DoReMiFaSoLaSiDomino	Kanata Nakamura (lyrics); Choi Hyun Joon, Kim Seung Soo (composition & arrangement)	"Domino"	129	Sub Vocal 1	Ren Kawashiri	22	12	
Future Bass	3 DoReMiFaSoLaSiDomino	Kanata Nakamura (lyrics); Choi Hyun Joon, Kim Seung Soo (composition & arrangement)	"Domino"	129	Sub Vocal 2	Jeong Young-hoon	18	17	
Future Bass	3 DoReMiFaSoLaSiDomino	Kanata Nakamura (lyrics); Choi Hyun Joon, Kim Seung Soo (composition & arrangement)	"Domino"	129	Sub Vocal 3	Takumi Kawanishi	11	24	
Future Bass	3 DoReMiFaSoLaSiDomino	Kanata Nakamura (lyrics); Choi Hyun Joon, Kim Seung Soo (composition & arrangement)	"Domino"	129	Sub vocal 4	Issei Mamehara	19	15	
Future Bass	3 DoReMiFaSoLaSiDomino	Kanata Nakamura (lyrics); Choi Hyun Joon, Kim Seung Soo (composition & arrangement)	"Domino"	129	Rapper 1	Shion Tsurubo	35	9	
Future Bass	3 DoReMiFaSoLaSiDomino	Kanata Nakamura (lyrics); Choi Hyun Joon, Kim Seung Soo (composition & arrangement)	"Domino"	129	Rapper 2	Kim Yoon-dong	19	15	
Dance / Hip-hop	4 KungChiKiTanpopo (クンチキたんぽぽ)	Young Jay, Buggy, Ven, Kohway, Kanata Nakamura (lyrics); Young Jay, Buggy, Ven, Kohway (composition & arrangement)	"KungChiKiTa" (クンチキタ)	174	Main vocal	Tatsutoshi Miyazato	12	5	+20,000
Dance / Hip-hop	4 KungChiKiTanpopo (クンチキたんぽぽ)	Young Jay, Buggy, Ven, Kohway, Kanata Nakamura (lyrics); Young Jay, Buggy, Ven, Kohway (composition & arrangement)	"KungChiKiTa" (クンチキタ)	174	Sub vocal 1	Kaito Okano	6	6	+20,000
Dance / Hip-hop	4 KungChiKiTanpopo (クンチキたんぽぽ)	Young Jay, Buggy, Ven, Kohway, Kanata Nakamura (lyrics); Young Jay, Buggy, Ven, Kohway (composition & arrangement)	"KungChiKiTa" (クンチキタ)	174	Sub vocal 2	Syoya Kimata	34	3	+20,000
Dance / Hip-hop	4 KungChiKiTanpopo (クンチキたんぽぽ)	Young Jay, Buggy, Ven, Kohway, Kanata Nakamura (lyrics); Young Jay, Buggy, Ven, Kohway (composition & arrangement)	"KungChiKiTa" (クンチキタ)	174	Sub vocal 3	Keigo Sato	41	2	+20,000
Dance / Hip-hop	4 KungChiKiTanpopo (クンチキたんぽぽ)	Young Jay, Buggy, Ven, Kohway, Kanata Nakamura (lyrics); Young Jay, Buggy, Ven, Kohway (composition & arrangement)	"KungChiKiTa" (クンチキタ)	174	Sub Vocal 4	Masanami Aoki	4	7	+20,000
Dance / Hip-hop	4 KungChiKiTanpopo (クンチキたんぽぽ)	Young Jay, Buggy, Ven, Kohway, Kanata Nakamura (lyrics); Young Jay, Buggy, Ven, Kohway (composition & arrangement)	"KungChiKiTa" (クンチキタ)	174	Rapper 1	Jun Uehara	31	4	+20,000
Dance / Hip-hop	4 KungChiKiTanpopo (クンチキたんぽぽ)	Young Jay, Buggy, Ven, Kohway, Kanata Nakamura (lyrics); Young Jay, Buggy, Ven, Kohway (composition & arrangement)	"KungChiKiTa" (クンチキタ)	174	Rapper 2	Minato Inoue	46	1	+100,000
House	5 Happy Merry	Yu-ki Kokubo (lyrics); Bae Jae Seok, Yu-ki Kokubo (composition); Bae Jae Seok (arrangement)	"Happy Merry Christmas"	131	Main vocal	Shuta Urano	3	33	
House	5 Happy Merry	Yu-ki Kokubo (lyrics); Bae Jae Seok, Yu-ki Kokubo (composition); Bae Jae Seok (arrangement)	"Happy Merry Christmas"	131	Sub Vocal 1	Ruki Shiroiwa	70	8	
House	5 Happy Merry	Yu-ki Kokubo (lyrics); Bae Jae Seok, Yu-ki Kokubo (composition); Bae Jae Seok (arrangement)	"Happy Merry Christmas"	131	Sub vocal 2	Taiga Nakamoto	7	29	
House	5 Happy Merry	Yu-ki Kokubo (lyrics); Bae Jae Seok, Yu-ki Kokubo (composition); Bae Jae Seok (arrangement)	"Happy Merry Christmas"	131	Sub vocal 3	Shion Tokonami	24	11	
House	5 Happy Merry	Yu-ki Kokubo (lyrics); Bae Jae Seok, Yu-ki Kokubo (composition); Bae Jae Seok (arrangement)	"Happy Merry Christmas"	131	Sub vocal 4	Naoki Ozawa	2	35	
House	5 Happy Merry	Yu-ki Kokubo (lyrics); Bae Jae Seok, Yu-ki Kokubo (composition); Bae Jae Seok (arrangement)	"Happy Merry Christmas"	131	Rapper 1	Raira Sato	16	18	
House	5 Happy Merry	Yu-ki Kokubo (lyrics); Bae Jae Seok, Yu-ki Kokubo (composition); Bae Jae Seok (arrangement)	"Happy Merry Christmas"	131	Rapper 2	Kanta Migakida	9	27	

== Debut Evaluation Performances (Episode 12) ==
Color key

- Leader
- Center

Performance			Contestant	
#	Producer	Song	Position	Name
1	UNO BUCKX (lyrics); VERSACHOI (composition); Sun (composition & lyrics)	"Young"	Main Vocal	Tomoaki Ando
1	UNO BUCKX (lyrics); VERSACHOI (composition); Sun (composition & lyrics)	"Young"	Sub Vocal 1	Ren Kawashiri
1	UNO BUCKX (lyrics); VERSACHOI (composition); Sun (composition & lyrics)	"Young"	Sub Vocal 2	Ruki Shiroiwa
1	UNO BUCKX (lyrics); VERSACHOI (composition); Sun (composition & lyrics)	"Young"	Sub Vocal 3	Shunya Osawa
1	UNO BUCKX (lyrics); VERSACHOI (composition); Sun (composition & lyrics)	"Young"	Sub Vocal 4	Shosei Ohira
1	UNO BUCKX (lyrics); VERSACHOI (composition); Sun (composition & lyrics)	"Young"	Sub Vocal 5	Syoya Kimata
1	UNO BUCKX (lyrics); VERSACHOI (composition); Sun (composition & lyrics)	"Young"	Sub Vocal 6	Sho Yonashiro
1	UNO BUCKX (lyrics); VERSACHOI (composition); Sun (composition & lyrics)	"Young"	Rapper 1	Shion Tsurubo
1	UNO BUCKX (lyrics); VERSACHOI (composition); Sun (composition & lyrics)	"Young"	Rapper 2	Kosuke Honda
1	UNO BUCKX (lyrics); VERSACHOI (composition); Sun (composition & lyrics)	"Young"	Rapper 3	Yugo Miyajima
2	Yu-ki Kokubo (lyrics); HASEGAWA (composition); Coach & Sendo (composition & lyrics)	"GrandMaster"	Main vocal	Shion Tokonami
2	Yu-ki Kokubo (lyrics); HASEGAWA (composition); Coach & Sendo (composition & lyrics)	"GrandMaster"	Sub Vocal 1	Masahiko Imanishi
2	Yu-ki Kokubo (lyrics); HASEGAWA (composition); Coach & Sendo (composition & lyrics)	"GrandMaster"	Sub Vocal 2	Issei Mamehara
2	Yu-ki Kokubo (lyrics); HASEGAWA (composition); Coach & Sendo (composition & lyrics)	"GrandMaster"	Sub Vocal 3	Junki Kono
2	Yu-ki Kokubo (lyrics); HASEGAWA (composition); Coach & Sendo (composition & lyrics)	"GrandMaster"	Sub Vocal 4	Takumi Kawanishi
2	Yu-ki Kokubo (lyrics); HASEGAWA (composition); Coach & Sendo (composition & lyrics)	"GrandMaster"	Sub Vocal 5	Keigo Sato
2	Yu-ki Kokubo (lyrics); HASEGAWA (composition); Coach & Sendo (composition & lyrics)	"GrandMaster"	Sub Vocal 6	Sukai Kinjo
2	Yu-ki Kokubo (lyrics); HASEGAWA (composition); Coach & Sendo (composition & lyrics)	"GrandMaster"	Sub Vocal 7	Raira Sato
2	Yu-ki Kokubo (lyrics); HASEGAWA (composition); Coach & Sendo (composition & lyrics)	"GrandMaster"	Rapper 1	Minato Inoue
2	Yu-ki Kokubo (lyrics); HASEGAWA (composition); Coach & Sendo (composition & lyrics)	"GrandMaster"	Rapper 2	Jun Uehara
