= Somewhere Out There =

Somewhere Out There may refer to:

== Music ==
=== Albums ===
- Somewhere Out There (album), a 2012 album by MONKEY MAJIK

=== Songs ===
- "Somewhere Out There" (James Horner song), a 1986 song written by James Horner, performed by Linda Ronstadt and James Ingram, from the film An American Tail
- "Somewhere Out There" (Our Lady Peace song), a 2002 song on Our Lady Peace's album Gravity
- "Somewhere Out There" a song by Simon Townshend from the 1999 album Animal Soup
- "Somewhere Out There", a song by Steve Earle from the 1996 album El Corazón

== Other uses ==
- Somewhere Out There (film), an upcoming film directed by Alexander Payne
