= Tyr (comics) =

Tyr, in comics, may refer to:

- Tyr (Marvel Comics), an Asgardian in Marvel Comics
- Tyr (DC Comics), a villain in DC Comics
- Tyr, a character in the Danish series Valhalla

== See also ==
- Tyr (disambiguation)
