= Tire (disambiguation) =

A tire or tyre is the ring-shaped rubber covering that is fitted around the rim of a vehicle's wheel.

Tire may also refer to:

- A railway tire
- Tiredness or fatigue
- Tire, İzmir, a district in Turkey, and the center town of the district
- Tires (TV series), a 2024 comedy television series starring Shane Gillis

== See also ==
- Tyre (disambiguation)
- Tired (disambiguation)
