= Tyer =

Tyer is a surname. Notable people with this surname include:

- Edward Tyer (1830–1912), English railway engineer
- Mac Tyer (or Socrate Petnga, born 1979), French rapper
- Norma Tyer (born 1928), Australian composer

== Other ==
- Tyer's Electric Train Tablet, devised by Edward Tyer

== See also ==
- Tyers (disambiguation)
- Tyre (disambiguation)
