= Play It Cool, Guys =

Japanese manga series

- Cover of the first tankōbon volume

クールドジ男子 (Kūru Doji Danshi)
- Genre: Comedy, slice of life
- Manga
- Written by: Kokone Nata
- Published by: Square Enix
- English publisher: NA: Yen Press
- Imprint: Gangan Comics Pixiv
- Magazine: Pixiv; Pixiv Comic
- Original run: February 23, 2019 – present
- Volumes: 5
- Anime television series
- Directed by: Chiaki Kon
- Written by: Makoto Uezu
- Music by: Masato Nakayama
- Studio: Pierrot
- Licensed by: Crunchyroll
- Original network: TV Tokyo, AT-X, BS11
- Original run: October 11, 2022 – March 28, 2023
- Episodes: 24
- Original net animation

Petit Cool Doji Danshi no Hitokoma
- Directed by: Yū Hayata
- Written by: Mao Emura
- Studio: Aqua Aris
- Released: March 21, 2023 – March 28, 2023
- Episodes: 2
- Television drama
- Directed by: Hiroaki Yuasa; Yuka Eda; Akina Yanagi
- Written by: Hiroyuki Komine
- Studio: TV Tokyo; Robot
- Original network: TXN (TV Tokyo)
- Original run: April 15, 2023 – July 1, 2023
- Episodes: 12
- icon

Play It Cool, Guys (Japanese: クールドジ男子, Hepburn: Kūru Doji Danshi; lit. 'Cool Clumsy Guys') is a Japanese web manga series written and illustrated by Kokone Nata. It has been serialized on the Pixiv website since February 2019, with its chapters collected into five tankōbon volumes as of October 2022. An anime television series adaptation produced by Pierrot aired from October 2022 to March 2023. A television drama adaptation aired from April to July 2023.

== Plot ==
Despite their distinctive personalities, Souma Shiki, Hayate Ichikura, Shun Futami, and Takayuki Mima all have one thing in common: though naturally clumsy, the four disguise their embarrassment from tiny slip-ups by maintaining a composed demeanor. However, it is actually the guys' airheaded natures that makes the girls' hearts throb. No matter what happens in their daily lives, the boys do their best not to lose their cool!

== Characters ==
Hayate Ichikura (一倉 颯, Ichikura Hayate)
Voiced by: Chiaki Kobayashi
Portrayed by: Yuta Nakamoto
Hayate is a 20-year-old university student majoring in economics. He gets embarrassed whenever he becomes clumsy. He loves animals and enjoys reading.
Shun Futami (二見 瞬, Futami Shun)
Voiced by: Koki Uchiyama
Portrayed by: Maito Fujioka
Shun is a 17-year-old high school student who is athletic. He tends to pretend whatever clumsy action he has done was made on purpose. He enjoys playing sports.
Takayuki Mima (三間 貴之, Mima Takayuki)
Voiced by: Yūichirō Umehara
Portrayed by: Dori Sakurada
Mima is a 27-year-old salaryman who is seen as a mascot by his co-workers. He tends to be unfazed and oblivious whenever he becomes clumsy. He is childhood friends with Motoharu.
Sōma Shiki (四季 蒼真, Shiki Sōma)
Voiced by: Shōya Chiba
Portrayed by: Takumi Kawanishi
Sōma is a 19-year-old vocational student studying at a vocational design school. He tends to be positive whenever he does something clumsy.
Motoharu Igarashi (五十嵐 元晴, Igarashi Motoharu)
Voiced by: Makoto Furukawa
Igarashi is a 27-year-old author and a friend of Mima's from elementary school. He is described as a genius who can be clumsy as well.
Asami Futami (二見 あさみ, Futami Asami)
Voiced by: Satomi Satō
Portrayed by: Ryō Satō
Asami is Shun's older sister and the owner of the cafe Hayate and Sōma work at.
Sōta Shiki (四季 爽太, Shiki Sōta)
Voiced by: Kazuyuki Okitsu
Portrayed by: Kazuma Sano
Sōta is Mima's superior at work and Sōma's older brother.
Kurosaki (黒崎)
Voiced by: Taku Yashiro
Portrayed by: Kentarō Tomita
Akai (赤井)
Voiced by: Kengo Takanashi
Kida (黄田)
Voiced by: Seiichiro Yamashita
Aoyama (青山)
Voiced by: Kōhei Amasaki
Momo Momosaki (桃崎 もも, Momosaki Momo)
Voiced by: Haruka Shiraishi
Akane Kōno (紅野 茜, Kōno Akane)
Voiced by: Yō Taichi
Shirakawa (白川)
Voiced by: Ayako Kawasumi

== Production ==
While the manga series is in full color, Kokone Nata can color one page in about 30 minutes so she can finish the coloring work of 19 pages within one day.

== Media ==
=== Manga ===
Written and illustrated by Kokone Nata, Play It Cool, Guys started as a series of illustrations published on the author's Twitter account since May 11, 2018, before being serialized as a web manga on Pixiv on February 23, 2019. The manga has also been serialized on Pixiv's Pixiv Comic service. As of October 2022, five tankōbon volumes have been released by Square Enix under its Gangan Comics Pixiv imprint. In September 2020, Yen Press announced that it had licensed the series for English publication.

==== Volumes ====
No.	Original release date	Original ISBN	English release date	English ISBN
1	June 22, 2019	978-4-75-755934-9	March 9, 2021	978-1-97-532152-9
2	March 21, 2020	978-4-75-756544-9	June 29, 2021	978-1-97-532408-7
3	January 22, 2021	978-4-75-756821-1	May 24, 2022	978-1-97-533826-8
4	November 22, 2021	978-4-75-757585-1	September 27, 2022	978-1-97-534668-3
5	October 21, 2022	978-4-75-758150-0	January 23, 2024	978-1-97-537540-9

=== Novel ===
A novel adaptation written by Shino Kaida, titled Cool Doji Danshi: Connect It Cool, Guys, was published by Square Enix on March 21, 2020.

=== Anime ===
An anime television series adaptation was announced on April 22, 2022. It is produced by Pierrot and directed by Chiaki Kon, with scripts written by Makoto Uezu, and music composed by Masato Nakayama. Eri Taguchi is handling the character designs and serving as chief animation director. The series aired from October 11, 2022, to March 28, 2023, on TV Tokyo, AT-X, and BS11. (Note: TV Tokyo lists the series premiere at 25:30 on October 10, 2022, which is effectively 1:30 a.m. JST on October 11.) It ran for two cours, and consisted of 15-minute episodes. The opening theme songs are "Seishun Kippu" (青春切符; "Youth Ticket") by Mafumafu and "Warau na!" (笑うな！; "Don't Laugh!") by Syudou. The ending theme songs are "Flash!" and "Taisetsu" (たいせつ; "Precious"), both performed by PICG, a unit composed of Chiaki Kobayashi, Koki Uchiyama, Yūichirō Umehara, and Shōya Chiba. Crunchyroll streamed the series.

A two-episode spin-off anime, titled Petit Cool Doji Danshi no Hitokoma, premiered on NTT Docomo's dTV streaming service on March 21 and March 28, 2023. It is produced by Aqua Aris, with Yū Hayata directing and providing the character designs, and Mao Emura writing the screenplay.

==== Episodes ====
No.	Title	Directed by	Written by	Storyboarded by	Original release date
1	"Ichikura Hayate"; Transliteration: "Ichikura Hayate" (Japanese: 一倉颯)	Chiaki Kon	Makoto Uezu	Chiaki Kon	October 11, 2022
2	"Futami Shun"; Transliteration: "Futami Shun" (Japanese: 二見瞬)	Chiaki Kon	Yasuko Aoki	Chiaki Kon	October 18, 2022
3	"Mima Takayuki"; Transliteration: "Mima Takayuki" (Japanese: 三間貴之)	Nozomi Fukui	Tomoharu Suzuki	Chiaki Kon	October 25, 2022
4	"Shiki Souma"; Transliteration: "Shiki Sōma" (Japanese: 四季蒼真)	Nozomi Fukui	Yasuko Aoki	Chiaki Kon	November 1, 2022
5	"Shared Table"; Transliteration: "Aiseki" (Japanese: 相席)	Yūta Suzuki	Makoto Uezu	Chiaki Kon	November 8, 2022
6	"Things in Common"; Transliteration: "Kyōtsūten" (Japanese: 共通点)	Yūta Suzuki	Tomoharu Suzuki	Chiaki Kon	November 15, 2022 (Note: This episode aired at 1:40 a.m. JST, 10 minutes after the original air time on TV Tokyo.)
7	"Loop"; Transliteration: "Rūpu" (Japanese: ループ)	Takahiro Enokida	Makoto Uezu	Chiaki Kon	November 22, 2022
8	"Detour"; Transliteration: "Mawarimichi" (Japanese: まわりみち)	Takahiro Enokida	Yasuko Aoki	Chiaki Kon	November 29, 2022
9	"Bento"; Transliteration: "Obentō" (Japanese: お弁当)	Chiaki Kon	Tomoharu Suzuki	Chiaki Kon	December 6, 2022
10	"Day Off"; Transliteration: "Yasumi no Hi" (Japanese: 休みの日)	Chiaki Kon	Chiaki Kon	Chiaki Kon	December 13, 2022
11	"Everyday"; Transliteration: "Nichijō" (Japanese: 日常)	Nozomi Fukui	Tomoharu Suzuki	Chiaki Kon	December 20, 2022 (Note: This episode aired at 2:19 a.m. JST, 49 minutes after the original air time on TV Tokyo.)
12	"Progress"; Transliteration: "Zenshin" (Japanese: 前進)	Nozomi Fukui	Yasuko Aoki	Nozomi Fukui	December 27, 2022 (Note: This episode aired at 2:00 a.m. JST, 30 minutes after the original air time on TV Tokyo.)
13	"Reunion"; Transliteration: "Saikai" (Japanese: 再会)	Shizutaka Sugahara	Makoto Uezu	Shizutaka Sugahara	January 10, 2023
14	"Nice Location"; Transliteration: "Ii Tokoro" (Japanese: いいところ)	Shizutaka Sugahara	Tomoharu Suzuki	Nozomi Fukui	January 17, 2023
15	"Talking About Love"; Transliteration: "Koibana" (Japanese: 恋バナ)	Kaito Asakura	Yasuko Aoki	Yūta Suzuki	January 24, 2023
16	"Umbrella and..." Transliteration: "Kasa to..." (Japanese: 傘と…)	Yūta Suzuki	Tomoharu Suzuki	Yūta Suzuki	January 31, 2023
17	"Catalyst"; Transliteration: "Kikkake" (Japanese: きっかけ)	Yūta Suzuki	Makoto Uezu	Yūta Suzuki	February 7, 2023
18	"Takayuki and Motoharu"; Transliteration: "Takayuki to Motoharu" (Japanese: 貴之と元晴)	Kaito Asakura	Chiaki Kon	Shizutaka Sugahara	February 14, 2023
19	"New Member"; Transliteration: "Menbā-iri" (Japanese: メンバー入り)	Nozomi Fukui	Makoto Uezu	Nozomi Fukui	February 21, 2023
20	"Things You Don't Like"; Transliteration: "Nigate na Mono" (Japanese: 苦手なもの)	Nozomi Fukui	Yasuko Aoki	Nozomi Fukui	February 28, 2023
21	"Friends"; Transliteration: "Tomodachi" (Japanese: 友達)	Yūta Suzuki	Tomoharu Suzuki	Yukihiro Matsushita	March 7, 2023
22	"Summer Festival"; Transliteration: "Natsumatsuri" (Japanese: 夏祭り)	Takahiro Enokida	Tomoharu Suzuki	Yukihiro Matsushita	March 14, 2023
23	"Summer Sky and Sea"; Transliteration: "Natsuzora to Umi" (Japanese: 夏空と海)	Takahiro Enokida	Tomoharu Suzuki	Yukihiro Matsushita	March 21, 2023
24	"Cool and Awkward Guys"; Transliteration: "Kūru Doji na Danshi-tachi" (Japanese: クールドジな男子たち)	Chiaki Kon, Nozomi Fukui	Makoto Uezu	Chiaki Kon, Yūta Suzuki, Nozomi Fukui	March 28, 2023

=== Drama ===
A television drama adaptation was announced on February 24, 2023. It is directed by Hiroaki Yuasa, Yuka Eda, and Akina Yanagi, based on a screenplay by Hiroyuki Komine. The series aired on TV Tokyo from April 15 to July 1, 2023. Yuta Nakamoto of NCT 127, Takumi Kawanishi of JO1, Dori Sakurada, and Maito Fujioka were cast to play the main roles.

== Reception ==
In 2019, the manga was ranked 16th in Takarajimasha's Kono Manga ga Sugoi! guidebook for best manga series in 2019 for female readers, placed 7th in Pixiv and Nippon Shuppan Hanbai's Web Manga General Election, and was placed 16th in the Next Manga Awards.
