= Tyers =

Tyers may refer to:

== People ==
- Angus Tyers (born 1987), Australian rower
- Charles Tyers (1806–1870), explorer of Australia
- Joe Tyers (born 2000), English boxer
- Jonathan Tyers (1702–1767), owner of Vauxhall Gardens and the Denbies estate
- J.H. Tyers, English swimmer dominant in 1890s
- Kathy Tyers (born 1952), American author
- Máiréad Tyers (born 1998), Irish actress
- Pádraig Tyers (1925–2010), Irish Gaelic footballer
- Thomas Tyers (1726–1787), English playboy and dilettante author
- William H. Tyers (1870–1924), American musician and conductor

== Places ==
- Tyers, Victoria, a small town in Australia named after Charles Tyers.
- Tyers River, river in West Gippsland, Victoria, Australia
- Mount Tyers, a low peak of Mount Baw Baw, Australia

== See also ==
- Tyer
