= Westview (album) =

westview

Studio album by MONKEY MAJIK
- Released: 2 February 2011
- Genre: Pop rock, J-Pop
- Length: 55:14
- Label: Binyl Records
- Producer: Maynard Plant, Blaise Plant

MONKEY MAJIK chronology
| Time (2008) | westview (2011) | Somewhere Out There (2012) |

Westview (stylized as westview) is the 6th full album released by MONKEY MAJIK on February 2, 2011 in celebration of their 10-year anniversary. Westview is a follow-up album to their album eastview released in 2005. Most of the tracks recorded for westview were recorded in Greece. The song "Sunshine" was used as the opening song for the anime "ぬらりひょんの孫 (Nurarihyon no Mago)."

== Track listing ==
All tracks are written by MONKEY MAJIK.

| No. | Title | Length |
|---|---|---|
| 1. | "Angel" | 4:29 |
| 2. | "The Man You Were" | 2:53 |
| 3. | "Sunshine" | 3:58 |
| 4. | "夢の世界 (Yume no Sekai, Dream World)" | 4:50 |
| 5. | "魔法の言葉 (Mahō no Kotoba, Magic Words)" | 3:33 |
| 6. | "Runaway" | 4:14 |
| 7. | "Disco Girl" | 3:00 |
| 8. | "Wonderland" | 4:07 |
| 9. | "Everything is going to be alright" | 4:29 |
| 10. | "the party's over" | 3:24 |
| 11. | "One Day" | 5:14 |
| 12. | "Safari" | 3:32 |
| 13. | "If I Knew" | 3:29 |
| 14. | "HALO" | 4:11 |
