= Issei Mamehara =

Japanese singer and actor (born 2002)

- 豆原 一成
- Mamehara in 2026
- Born: May 30, 2002 (age 24); Maniwa, Okayama, Japan
- Other name: Máme
- Occupations: Singer; actor
- Musical career
- Genres: J-pop; K-pop
- Instrument: Vocals
- Years active: 2019–present
- Label: Lapone
- Member of: JO1
- Website: Official website

Japanese name
- Kanji: 豆原 一成
- Hiragana: まめはら いっせい
- Romanization: Mamehara Issei

Korean name
- Hangul: 마메하라 잇세이
- Revised Romanization: Mamehara Itsei
- McCune–Reischauer: Mamehara Issei

Issei Mamehara (豆原 一成, Mamehara Issei; born May 30, 2002), is a Japanese singer and actor. He debuted as a member of the Japanese boy band JO1 in 2020, after placing first in the first season of Produce 101 Japan. He made his debut as an actor in 2021 and played Kamen Rider Chimera in the Kamen Rider Revice films.

== Early life and education ==
Issei Mamehara was born on May 30, 2002, in Maniwa, Okayama, Japan. During his early years, he developed a passion for physical activities, participating in baseball, swimming, and sumo tournaments throughout his school life. Mamehara's interest in dance emerged during elementary school, inspired by his older sister's dance classes. This interest deepened when he became a fan of the boy band Generations from Exile Tribe after watching one of their televised performances, prompting him to enroll in a dance school in his second year of junior high. He specialized in 1990s hip hop dance and began teaching children at the same dance school by his freshman year of high school. Mamehara also grew up with a deep appreciation for tokusatsu media, particularly the Kamen Rider franchise, and aspired to appear in the series as an actor.

Mamehara graduated from high school in March 2021.

== Career ==
=== 2019–2020: Produce 101 Japan and debut with JO1 ===
After failing a series of auditions in 2019, Mamehara's older sister, a fan of South Korean Produce 101, suggested he try out for Produce 101 Japan. Having limited knowledge about K-pop, he initially refused to apply because he wanted to be a professional dancer instead. He eventually applied a day before the deadline, following his sister's encouragement. The show was held from September to December, where he finished first with 261,583 votes.

Following an "intense" boot camp in South Korea, seventeen-year-old Mamehara debuted as a member of the resulting boy group JO1 on March 4, 2020, with the release of their first single Protostar under Lapone Entertainment. His win awarded him the choreographic center position in the group's debut song, "Infinity".

=== 2020–present: Acting debut ===
In November 2020, Mamehara was named Mezamashi TV's monthly entertainment presenter, making him the segment's youngest presenter at that time. He then took acting classes and made his acting debut in the Yoshimoto Kogyo-produced anthology film, Meters Away, Worlds Apart in 2021, alongside Produce 101 Japan's host and comedian Takashi Okamura. In 2022, Mamehara was cast as Kamen Rider Chimera in the film Kamen Rider Revice: Battle Familia. He reprised his role in Birth of Chimera (2022), an exclusive Toei Tokusatsu Fan Club spin-off film that delves into his character's backstory.

In 2023, he made his small screen debut in NHK's War Records of Superhuman Fortress Hiroshi, as the humanoid Hiroshi. In the following year, he made his TBS Sunday Theatre debut in the Ryunosuke Kamiki-led drama The Diamond Sleeping in the Sea. In February 2025, Mamehara was appointed as an ambassador to his hometown of Maniwa. Later that year, he played the lead role of Tsukasa Kiriki for the live action movie adaptation of the manga Bad Boys and co-starred opposite Yoshie Ichige in the family drama Mt. Fuji, Coffee, and the Formula for Happiness. He played Ichige's grandson, Takuma, a university student who likes coffee and discovers his dream with his grandmother. In July 2026, Mamehara co-starred alongside Rino Katase on the TV Tokyo's drama Fūfu to 16-sai: Kyōki no Rinjin (夫婦と16歳〜狂気の隣人〜, The Married Couple and The 16-Year Old: The Crazy Neighbor). He played Hiro Nomura, the married man Katase's character falls in love with, and sang the theme song "Murasakiiro" (むらさきいろ), written by his bandmate Takumi Kawanishi.

== Discography ==
=== Singles ===
List of singles as a lead artist, with selected chart positions, showing year released and album name
Title	Year	Peak chart position		Sales	Album
Title	Year	JPN Dig.	JPN DL	Sales	Album
"Not Puppy Love"	2025	49	47	JPN: 715	Non-album singles
"Murasakiiro" (むらさきいろ)	2026	32	32	JPN: 759	Non-album singles

=== Songwriting credits ===
All song credits are adapted from the Japanese Society for Rights of Authors, Composers and Publishers's database, unless otherwise noted.

Key
†	Indicates single
#	Indicates a non-commercial release

List of songs, showing year released, artist name, and name of the album
Title	Year	Artist(s)	Album	Lyrics		Ref.
Title	Year	Artist(s)	Album	Credit	With	Ref.
"Breaking the Rules"	2023	Keigo, Takumi, Máme	2023 JO1 2nd Arena Live Tour "Beyond the Dark – Rise in Kyocera Dome"	Yes	Keigo, T.K, Máme	
"Not Puppy Love" †	2025	Máme	PlanJ tracks (Note: PlanJ is a series of self-projects by JO1 members on YouTube.)	Yes	Sean Bowe	
"Mama" (ママへ) #	2025	Máme	PlanJ tracks	Yes	Makka	

== Filmography ==
=== Film ===
List of films, with the release year, role, and note
Year	Title	Role	Note	Ref.
2021	Meters Away, Worlds Apart	Hiroki Asada	Segment: "Today is A Good Day"	
2022	Kamen Rider Revice: Battle Familia	Nozomu Otani / Kamen Rider Chimera		
2025	Bad Boys: The Movie	Tsukasa Kiriki	Lead role	
2025	Mt. Fuji, Coffee, and the Formula for Happiness	Takuma Andō	Lead role	

=== Television ===
List of television programs, with the release year, role, and note
Year	Title	Role	Note	Ref.
2019	Produce 101 Japan	Contestant	Finished 1st	
2020	Mezamashi TV	Host of the month	For November 2020	
2022	Short Program	Hajime Toshino	Lead role; anthology series	
2022	Kamen Rider Revice Movie Spin-Off Web Drama: Birth of Chimera	Nozomu Otani	Lead role; television film	
2023	War Records of Superhuman Fortress Hiroshi	Hiroshi Tanaka		
2023	Azatoi Type A to Z	Takuma	Drama segment of Azatoku Nani ga Waruino?	
2023	An Encouragement of Laughing Life	Nobuyuki Yamamoto		
2024	Mame's and Sho's Best Holiday - JO1derful Tour	Himself	With Sho Yonashiro	
2024	The Diamond Sleeping in the Sea	Seiya		
2026	The Married Couple and The 16-Year Old: The Crazy Neighbor	Hiro Nomura	Lead role	

=== Music videos ===
List of music videos, showing year released and directors
Title	Year	Director	Ref.
"Not Puppy Love"	2025	Fumiya Hirai	
"Mama" (ママへ)	2025	Shun Murakami (Vil Tokyo)	
