= Cornish numerals =

Counting system used in the Cornish language

In the counting system used in the Cornish language, the numerals (number words) below 100 are based on twenties: so numbers from 21–39 are "x on twenty", 41–59 are "x on two twenty", numbers from 61–79 are "x on three twenty", and numbers from 81–99 are "x on four twenty". 40 is "two twenty", 60 is "three twenty", and 80 is "four twenty". This is very similar to counting in the Welsh language. It is also similar to the French numerals for 60–99.

== Numerals ==
Number	Cardinal no.	Ordinal no.
0	mann, zero	
1	onan, unn	kensa
2	dew (m), diw (f); both + soft mutation	nessa
3	tri (m), teyr (f); both + aspirate mutation	tressa
4	peswar (m), peder (f)	peswera
5	pymp	pympes
6	hwegh	hweghes
7	seyth	seythves (etc.)
8	eth	
9	naw	
10	deg	
11	unnek	
12	dewdhek	
13	tredhek	
14	peswardhek	
15	pymthek	
16	hwetek	
17	seytek	
18	etek	
19	nownsek	
20	ugens	
21	onan warn ugens ("one on twenty")	kensa warn ugens, etc.
22	dew/diw warn ugens	
23	tri/teyr warn ugens	
24	peswar/peder warn ugens	
25	pymp warn ugens	
26	hwegh warn ugens	
27	seyth warn ugens	
28	eth warn ugens	
29	naw warn ugens	
30	deg warn ugens ("ten on twenty")	
31	unnek warn ugens ("eleven on twenty")	
32	dewdhek warn ugens	
etc.
40	dew-ugens ("two-twenty")	
41	onan ha dew-ugens ("one and two-twenty")	
50	hanter kans ("half a hundred") deg ha dew-ugens ("ten and two-twenty")	
51	unnek ha dew-ugens	
60	tri-ugens ("three-twenty")	
61	onan ha tri-ugens	
70	deg ha tri-ugens ("ten and three-twenty")	
71	unnek ha tri-ugens ("eleven and three-twenty")	
80	peswar-ugens ("four-twenty")	
81	onan ha peswar-ugens	
90	deg ha peswar-ugens ("ten and four-twenty")	
91	unnek ha peswar-ugens ("eleven and four-twenty")	
100	kans	
200	dew kans	
300	tri hans	
400	peswar kans oll-ugens ("all-twenty")	
500	pymp kans	
600	hwegh kans	
1000	mil; + soft mutation	
2000	diw vil	
1,000,000	milvil, milyon	
1,000,000,000	bilyon	
1,000,000,000,000	trilyon	

== Variation in form ==
There is some syntactically and phonologically triggered variation in the form of numerals. There are, for example, masculine and feminine forms of the numbers "two" (dew and diw), "three" (tri and teyr) and "four" (peswar and peder), which must agree with the grammatical gender of the objects being counted. Numerals change as expected according to normal rules of consonant mutation; some also trigger mutation in some following words.

== Use with nouns ==
The singular form of the noun is used with numbers, but for larger numbers an alternative form is permitted, where a (partitive, "of") with the plural noun follows the number. Except where using this plural form, the noun is placed before any parts of the number that are added using warn ("on") or ha ("and") in the number system.

Nouns are also mutated following many numbers. Unn triggers the soft mutation of feminine nouns, but not masculine nouns. It also causes the word dydh "day" to become unn jydh "one day". Dew and diw both trigger the soft mutation. Tri and teyr trigger the aspirate mutation. The part of the number immediately preceding the noun will determine any mutation of the noun. In the plural form with a, the soft mutation is used as is normal after a.

The following example with kath ("cat") illustrates several of these points:

- Diw gath

Two cats

- Teyr hath warn ugens

Twenty-three cats (literally "Three cat on twenty")

- Etek kath ha tri-ugens

Seventy-eight cats (literally "Eighteen cat and three-twenty")

- Tri hans eth mil ha dew-ugens, hwegh kans naw kath ha tri-ugens or
- Tri hans eth mil ha dew-ugens, hwegh kans naw ha tri-ugens gathes

Three hundred and forty eight thousand, six hundred and sixty nine cats (348,669)

- Milvil gath or
- Milvil a gathes

A million cats
