= Tyr (disambiguation) =

Týr is the god of law, justice, the sky, war and heroic glory in Norse mythology.

Týr, Tyr, or TYR may also refer to:

== People ==
- Gabriel Tyr (1817–1868), French painter
- Tyr Walker (born 2003), Canadian soccer player
- Jan Erik Tiwaz (born 1972), also known as Tyr, Norwegian bassist formerly with the band Borknagar

== Music ==
- Týr (band), a Faroese folk metal band
- Tyr (album), a 1990 album by the heavy metal band Black Sabbath
- "Tyr", a 2017 single by Danheim

== Entertainment ==
- Tyr (comics), several characters
- Tyr (Forgotten Realms), a deity in the Dungeons & Dragons fantasy role-playing game
- Tyr, a city state in the Dark Sun Dungeons & Dragons universe
- Tyr Anasazi, a character on the television series Andromeda
- Tyr, a character in the video game God of War Ragnarök

== Ships ==
- HNoMS Tyr, several ships of the Royal Norwegian Navy
- ICGV Týr, a 1974 offshore patrol vessel and the flagship of the Icelandic Coast Guard
- Hvalur 9, a 1952 Icelandic whaler requisitioned by the Icelandic Coast Guard and renamed Týr

== Abbreviation ==
- Austrian Arrows (ICAO airline code TYR)
- County Tyrone, Northern Ireland (Chapman code TYR)
- Tyler Pounds Regional Airport, Tyler, Texas (IATA airport code TYR)
- Tyrosinase (TYR), a protein
- Tyrosine (Tyr), an amino acid

== Other uses ==
- Tyr (journal), US traditionalist journal
- Tyr, Russia, a village
- TYR Sport, a swimwear apparel and gear manufacturing company
- Ulmus × hollandica 'Tyr', a bonsai cultivar
- 4092 Tyr, an asteroid; see list of minor planets: 4001–5000
- Operation Tyr; see list of coalition military operations of the Iraq War

== See also ==
- Tyre (disambiguation)
