= Tired Mountain =

Mountain in Alaska, United States

Coordinates: 55°10′04″N 131°28′07″W

Tired Mountain is a summit in Prince of Wales – Hyder Census Area, Alaska, in the United States. With an elevation of 2,195 feet (669 m), Tired Mountain is the 1792nd highest summit in the state of Alaska.

Tired Mountain was named in 1883 by an officer of the United States Navy.
