= Somewhere Out There (album) =

Studio album by MONKEY MAJIK
- Released: 7 March 2012
- Genre: Pop rock, J-Pop
- Length: 47:10
- Label: Binyl Records
- Producer: Maynard Plant, Blaise Plant

MONKEY MAJIK chronology
Westview (2011)	Somewhere Out There (2012)

Somewhere Out There is the 7th full album released by MONKEY MAJIK on March 7, 2012. The album itself is a dedication to Sendai and all of those affected by the 2011 Tōhoku earthquake and tsunami, with songs that are reflective of this theme. The lead single from the album is "Headlight", followed by "HERO". "Ki wo Ueta Otoko" was released in 2011 as a digital charity single for the earthquakes.

== Track listing ==
All songs written by Maynard Plant, Blaise Plant and tax, except 3 & 5 by Maynard and Blaise, and 8, written (and originally performed) by 小田和正 (Kazumasa Oda).

No.	Title	Length
1.	"Headlight"	5:22
2.	"Black Hole"	4:26
3.	"ホワイトノイズ (Howaito Noizu, White Noise)"	4:00
4.	"U.F.O."	5:02
5.	"Go With U"	3:02
6.	"RAIN"	4:18
7.	"足跡 (Ashiato, Footprints)"	4:59
8.	"My Home Town"	4:01
9.	"トビラ (Tobira, Door)"	3:40
10.	"HERO"	4:55
11.	"木を植えた男 (Ki wo Ueta Otoko, The Man Who Planted a Tree)"	3:57

== Special Edition Bonus DVD ==
MONKEY MAJIK BEST ALBUM TOUR2010 ～10years&Forever～at 東京C.C.Lemonホール LIVE映像 (Tokyo C.C. Lemon Hall Live Eizou/Video) (53:42)

1. goin' places
2. tired
3. 大丈夫 (Daijoubu, All Right)
4. アイシテル (Aishiteru, I Love You)
5. Lily
6. Angel
7. 空はまるで (Sora wa Maru de, The Sky is Just Like)
8. Open Happiness
9. One moment
10. I like pop
11. 魔法の言葉 (Mahou no Katoba, Magic Words)
12. FOREVER
