= Monkey Majik =

Japanese pop rock band

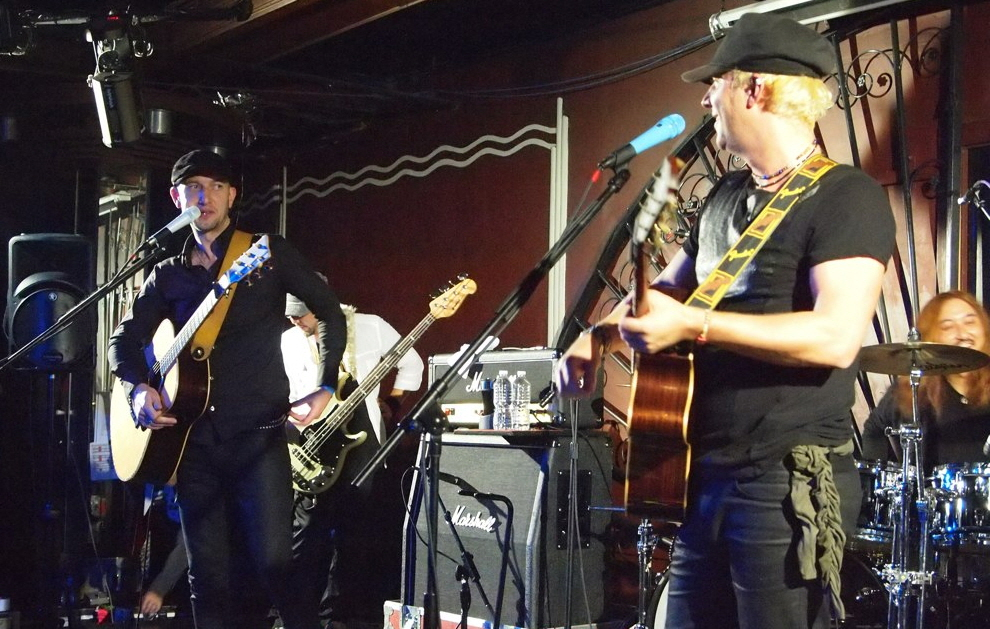
- Monkey Majik at Webster Hall, New York City, in November 2012

Background information
- Origin: Sendai, Miyagi, Japan
- Genres: Pop rock; alternative rock
- Years active: 2000–present
- Labels: Under Horse Records (2000 - 2005); Binyl Records (2006 - present)
- Members: Maynard Plant; Blaise Plant; Tax Kikuchi; Dick Mori
- Past members: Misao Urushizaka; Chad Ivany; Jan Kuypers; Tom Prichard
- Website: http://www.monkeymajik.com/

Monkey Majik (stylised as MONKEY MAJIK) is a Japanese pop rock band formed in 2000 in Sendai, Japan. The band consists of Canadian brothers, Maynard Plant and Blaise Plant, each acting as lead vocalists and guitarists, and two Japanese members: Tax on drums, and Dick on bass. Monkey Majik is signed to Binyl Records, a subsidiary of Avex Records.

The band rose to mainstream success after the 2006 success of their singles "Fly", and "Around the World" from the album Thank You, eventually reaching the top Oricon charts and collaborating with major Japanese sensations such as m-flo and SEAMO. As of 2012, they have released seven studio albums, four EP's, three physical live albums, three digital live albums, and three compilation albums, and have certified five singles through the Recording Industry Association of Japan. Since the debut of Monkey Majik, Maynard and Blaise have both simultaneously worked solo ventures into the music industry to much acclaim.

== History ==
=== Formation (2000–2002) ===
Monkey Majik was formed by Maynard Plant, Tom Pritchard, Chad Ivany, and Misao Urushizaka as a way to pass the times with friends in Aomori prefecture, Japan while serving as an Assistant Language Teacher (ALT) in the JET Programme, 1998–2001. They were named by Pritchard, an English drummer, in tribute to the song "Monkey Magic" performed by Godiego (later recorded and performed by the band as a tribute single, Monkey Majik x Monkey Magic, in 2007), which was the theme song to Saiyūki, a drama that was dubbed into English for broadcast in Great Britain as Monkey. The former drummer had watched the series as a child growing up in Britain and was a fan of the show and its theme song.

=== Debut: Tired, Spade, and Eastview (2002–2005) ===
With a line-up consisting of Urushizaka, Kuypers, and the Plant brothers, Monkey Majik released 1000 copies of their first EP, Tired, through Tower Records in Sendai in a personally-financed venture. Tired became the best-selling release at Tower Records for six consecutive weeks, cuing Monkey Majik to record their first full-length album.

A full-length debut album, Spade, was released through Tower Records in 2004. It stayed at the number 1 position on Tower's sales charts for 13 weeks straight, and then was released nationwide in 2004. Shortly thereafter, Kuypers and Urushizaka left the group, and were replaced by current band members, ex-dental technician and salaryman, drummer Tax (Takuya Kikuchi) and bassist Dick (Hideki Mori). In 2005, their second full-length studio album, Eastview, depicting a life in Japan from a westerner's view, was released. Eastview sold 14,000 units. The group was then picked up by avex in the latter half of that same year, propped up for a mainstream debut.

=== Mainstream success: Thank You, Sora wa Maru de.., and Time (2006–2010) ===
In 2006, Monkey Majik's first major label album, Thank You was released, with two leading singles paving the way to success: “Fly” (typeset as “fly”), and smash hit “Around the World”. The album hit gold standards with 97,000 albums sold during its initial run. “Around the World” reached No. 4 on the Oricon charts and became the theme song to the Japanese television drama, Saiyūki, or Journey to the West. It sold a total of 164,299 copies in Japan, becoming the 62nd most-purchased single of 2006 in the country.

Their fourth studio album, Sora wa Maru de.. (2007), had a slickly-produced pop-rock sound, with hip-hop artists m-flo and SEAMO participating. The title track quickly became a double-platinum download track.

In 2008, the band followed up with Time, which went gold, selling 116,000 units nationwide during its initial sales push. Later, in 2009, the band members were ushered in as Canadian-Japanese Kizuna, or Goodwill, Ambassadors in honor of the 80th Anniversary of Friendship between Canada and Japan, and had the honor of joining Emperor Akihito, Empress Michiko, Stephen Harper, and Laureen Teskey at the Lester B. Pearson Building in Ottawa, Ontario.

Finally, in 2010, the band released their second compilation album, Monkey Majik Best ~10 Years & Forever~, to commemorate their 10th anniversary. An independent single, "Aishiteru", also rose to popularity during this time, reaching No. 12 on the Oricon charts, and reaching No. 7 on Japan's Billboard Hot 100.

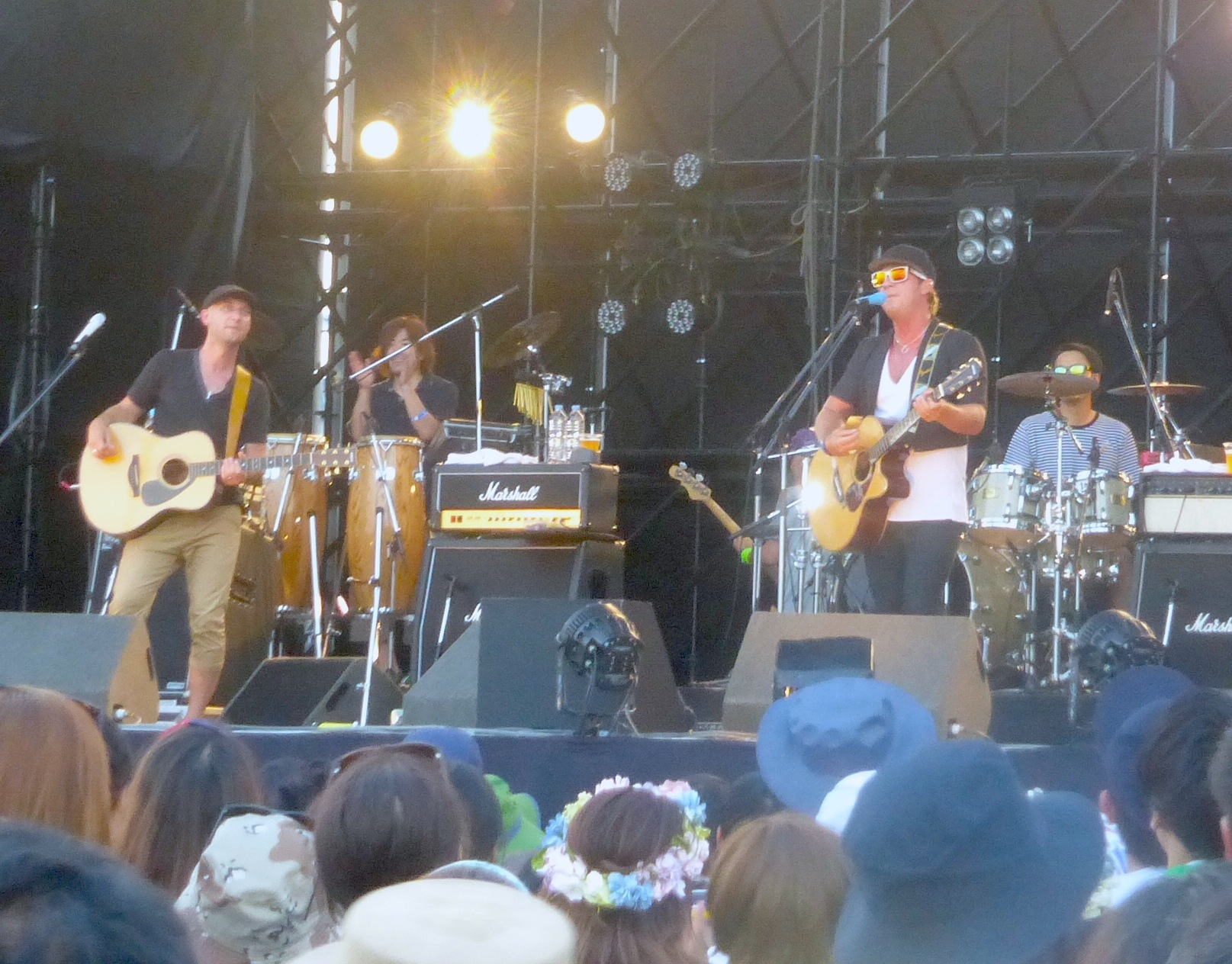
Monkey Majik performing at Tokyo Summer Sonic, 2015

=== Westview, the Tōhoku earthquake, and Somewhere Out There (2010–present) ===
In 2010, Monkey Majik produced and in 2011 released their sixth studio album, "Westview", a spiritual counterpart to "Eastview" reflecting the views of a Japanese in western society. The majority of the album was produced in Greece, where the band also had all promo pictures for the album taken. The lead single, Sunshine, was used as the opening theme of Weekly Shōnen Jump's anime adaptation of its popular manga, Nurarihyon no Mago.

In the course of the reconstructions after the 2011 Tōhoku earthquake and tsunami, Monkey Majik was invited to the 2011 edition of the Fantasy on Ice show in Niigata. They performed with figure skater and two-time Olympic champion, Yuzuru Hanyu, to the song "Change", which the band had recorded in collaboration with the Yoshida Brothers. More live show performances with Hanyu followed at the 2014 Together on Ice amongst others.

Somewhere Out There was released on March 7, 2012. Both leading singles, Headlight and HERO, were inspired by the Tōhoku disasters. On March 26, 2012, the band's official MTV Unplugged concert aired on television for the first time.

In 2017, they sung the ending of the movie Chou Super Hero Taisen, called ray of light. In the 2019-2020 Kamen Rider series Kamen Rider Zero-One, Maynard and Blaise Plant provided the voices for the Hiden Zero-One Driver and Progrise Keys. Later in 2021, they voiced the Massbrain System AI & Kamen Rider MetsubouJinrai, the main antagonist of the Zero-One Others V-CINEXT movies Kamen Rider MetsubouJinrai and Kamen Rider Vulcan & Valkyrie, in English. They also sung the two endings of those 2 movies S.O.S. and Frontier.

In 2018, Monkey Majik released their 11th Album, Enigma, followed up in 2020 by their 12th album Northview. Again, in 2023, they released another album, Curtain Call, and in 2024, they released their 14th album Circles. In this time frame, they also released several singles: Bitten By You was released in 2019, for the movie Spookiz, the song Eden for the anime series Fruits Basket (2019 reboot) as the second ending, and Running in the Dark, in 2022, as an image song for the 3.5 anniversary of the game Arknights. In 2025, the group released the single The Boyz.

== Band members ==
=== Current members ===
- Maynard Plant (since 2000) [born August 6, 1975, from Vanier, Ottawa, Ontario, Canada]: Vocals, rhythm guitar, songwriter
- Blaise Plant (since 2001) [born March 18, 1980, from Vanier, Ottawa, Ontario, Canada]: Lead guitar, vocals, producer, songwriter
- Takuya "Tax" Kikuchi (菊池拓哉) (since 2004) [born August 31, 1975, from Sendai, Miyagi, Japan]: Drums, percussion
- Hideki "Dick" Mori (森秀樹) (since 2004) [born March 10, 1978, from Sapporo, Hokkaidō, Japan]: Bass guitar

=== Supporting members ===
- Ichiro "Mister" Watanabe (渡邊一郎) (since 2006) [born April 1, 1978, from Ōgawara, Miyagi, Japan]: Keyboards

=== Past members ===
- Misao Urushizaka (漆坂ミサオ) (2000–2004) [from Towada, Aomori, Japan]: Bass guitar
- Chad Ivany (2000–2001): Lead guitar
- Tom Prichard (2000–2001): Drums, percussion
- Jan Kuypers (2001–2004): Drums, percussion

== Discography ==
=== Studio albums ===
- Spade (2003)
- Eastview (2005)
- Thank You (2006)
- Sora wa Marude (2007)
- Time (2008)
- Westview (2011)
- Somewhere Out There (2012)
- DNA (2013)
- Colour by Numbers (2015)
- Southview (2016)
- Enigma (2018)
- Northview (2020)
- Curtain Call (2023)
- Circles (2024)

=== RIAJ-certified songs ===
- "Around the World" (2006)
- "Sora wa Marude.." (2007)
- "Together / Akari / Fall Back" (2008)
- "Tada, Arigatō" (2008)
- "Aishiteru" (2009)
