= Sgt. Frog season 7 =

Season of television series

Sgt. Frog
- Season 7
- No. of episodes: 51

Release
- Original network: TV Tokyo
- Original release: April 3, 2010 – April 3, 2011

Season chronology
- ← Previous; Season 6

The seventh and final season of the Sgt. Frog anime series consists of 51 episodes after episode 307 from the series, which first aired in Japan from April 3, 2010, to April 3, 2011, on TV Tokyo. The season had its running time reduced to 15 minutes in its original timeslot. However, a 2nd timeslot, which reruns the first 15-minute story and presents a new 15 minute one, called Keroro Gunso Otsu (ケロロ軍曹乙), was created. The "A" stories are the ones shown in the old timeslot, while the "B" stories are exclusive to the Otsu timeslot. After timeslot changes caused by the 2011 Tōhoku earthquake and tsunami, episode 356 was announced to be the final Keroro Gunso Otsu episode, with two stories exclusively airing in the night timeslot at a timeslot of 3:05 am, the announcement also referenced in the first airing of episode 355. However, after a few days that announcement was changed, and Keroro Otsu was just delayed for one week, returning to the original plans for the series' ending, although airing everything one week later.

== Episode list ==
No.	Title	Original release date
308–A	"Keroro, nightmare in the third planet!" (Japanese: ケロロ 第三惑星の悪夢 であります)	April 3, 2010
Keroro has a recurring dream in which he successfully conquers Pekopon.
308–B	"Nocturnal Sergeant Keroro" (Japanese: 夜のケロロ軍曹 であります)	April 4, 2010
Keroro causes mischief late at night.
309–A	"Giroro, Pekopon invasion starts!" (Japanese: ギロロ ペコポン侵略開始! であります)	April 10, 2010
Giroro tries to take over Pekopon by himself.
309–B	"Giroro & Natsumi, operation cell phone mail" (Japanese: ギロロ&夏美 携帯メール作戦 であります)	April 11, 2010
Keroro takes advantage of people's reliance on text messaging by setting up a conversation with Natsumi.
310–A	"Tamama, Kingdom of Sweets" (Japanese: タママ お菓子の王国 であります)	April 17, 2010
Tamama turns the entire house into a wonderland made entirely of sweets.
310–B	"Momoka, I appreciate your kindness" (Japanese: 桃華 お世話になります であります)	April 18, 2010
Momoka and her crew move in with the Hinata family after the Nishizawa Group suddenly goes bankrupt.
311–A	"Kululu, the invasion has started" (Japanese: クルル 侵略ははじまっている であります)	April 24, 2010
It's Kururu's turn to come up with an invasion plan, and the others are scared of what kind of horrific antics he has in store.
311–B	"Keroro, a good kero story!" (Japanese: ケロロ ケロいい話! であります)	April 25, 2010
The platoon try to force Fuyuki into giving up the Kero Ball.
312–A	"Dororo, invasion is my mission!" (Japanese: ドロロ 侵略こそ我が使命! であります)	May 1, 2010
An evil clone of Dororo plots to kill Natsumi.
312–B	"Koyuki's Se-cre-t." (Japanese: 小雪 のヒ・ミ・ツ…。 であります)	May 2, 2010
Koyuki seems to be hiding something from the others, so they follow her around to find out what it is.
313–A	"Keroro, invasion achievement in the next day" (Japanese: ケロロ 侵略達成翌日 であります)	May 8, 2010
Keroro's mom returns, and is intent on her son finishing the invasion.
313–B	"Aki, becoming an invader" (Japanese: 秋 侵略者になる であります)	May 9, 2010
Aki joins the platoon for a day.
314–A	"Keroro, naked invasion" (Japanese: ケロロ 裸の侵略者 であります)	May 15, 2010
Keroro psychologically manipulates people into believing that he has a gun that only idiots can't see.
314–B	"Natsumi & Saburo, launch break of the skies" (Japanese: 夏美&サブロー 昼休みの空 であります)	May 16, 2010
Natsumi and Saburo try to enjoy their lunch break while dealing with Keroro and the others' constant interruptions.
315–A	"Keroro, enjoyable horticulture" (Japanese: ケロロ 楽しい園芸 であります)	May 22, 2010
Keroro starts turning into a plant after eating a strange flower seed.
315–B	"Fuyuki, Shadow stepping of the other days" (Japanese: 冬樹 いつかの影ふみ であります)	May 23, 2010
Everyone plays shadow tag while Fuyuki tries to find a place he saw in his dreams.
316–A	"Momoka, I'm the sergeant?" (Japanese: 桃華 私は軍曹? であります)	May 29, 2010
Momoka becomes the sergeant after switching bodies with Keroro.
316–B	"Keroro, invasion operation from space" (Japanese: ケロロ 宇宙からの侵略者作戦 であります)	May 30, 2010
Keroro and friends try to scare Fuyuki and Natsumi by pretending to be alien invaders.
317–A	"Keroro, Viper search!" (Japanese: ケロロ ヴァイパーを捜せ! であります)	June 5, 2010
Keroro is convinced that Viper is disguised as one of his friends, so he interrogates them to find out who it is.
317–B	"Giroro, soldier in the closet" (Japanese: ギロロ 天袋の中の戦士 であります)	June 6, 2010
Giroro is trapped in the closet.
318–A	"Dororo, the man of the mask" (Japanese: ドロロ 仮面の男 であります)	June 12, 2010
Keroro wants to see what Dororo looks like without his mask.
318–B	"Mois, black visitor" (Japanese: モア 黒い来訪者 であります)	June 13, 2010
Mois' old pen-pal Maya comes to visit. Tamama is jealous that he now has another "rival" for the sergeant's affections, while Momoka is angry when she sees Maya interacting with Fuyuki.
319–A	"Mois, genius hacker?" (Japanese: モア 天才ハッカー? であります)	June 19, 2010
While trying to print out a photo, Mois accidentally hacks into Kururu's computer database.
319–B	"Kululu, small old clock" (Japanese: クルル 小さな古時計 であります)	June 20, 2010
A talking antique clock named Gurong arrives in the mail, but he is in need of new parts. To fix him, Kururu must buy a repair robot in an online auction.
320–A	"Natsumi, charming invaders" (Japanese: 夏美憧れの侵略者 であります)	June 26, 2010
The platoon poses as a group of bishonen idols to invade Pekopon.
320–B	"Pururu, June's bride?" (Japanese: プルル 六月の花嫁?であります)	June 27, 2010
The platoon helps out Bariri again by disguising him as a human bachelor.
321–A	"Keroro, learning with the old" (Japanese: ケロロ 古きに学べであります)	July 3, 2010
Keroro tries to improve his team's success by cutting back on modern technology.
321–B	"Natsumi, gentleness is a sin..." (Japanese: 夏美 優しさは罪…であります)	July 4, 2010
Natsumi starts acting extremely nice towards Keroro for some reason. When the others begin to act this way as well, Keroro fears that he may be done for.
322–A	"Giroro, impossible escape?!" (Japanese: ギロロ 脱出不可能! であります)	July 10, 2010
Giroro is trapped in his test rocket in space, and the others have to find a way to bring him back.
322–B	"Keroro, impossible rescue?!" (Japanese: ケロロ 救出不可能? であります)	July 11, 2010
This episode shows the events of the previous episode from Keroro's point of view. It is revealed that Giroro and his spaceship were actually in the bathtub the whole time, and everyone's attempts to bring him back were really attempts to keep him from finding out the truth.
323–A	"Keroro, advent of the space chief of house-sitting" (Japanese: ケロロ 宇宙御留守番長降臨 であります)	July 17, 2010
Keroro has to watch the house all by himself while the Hinata family is away for a night.
323–B	"Natsumi, Cameraman training battlefield!" (Japanese: 夏美 戦場カメラマン大訓練! であります)	July 18, 2010
Natsumi gets trapped inside of the Kero Ball.
324–A	"Natsumi, presses it!" (Japanese: 夏美 押すな! であります)	July 24, 2010
Natsumi keeps seeing buttons that say "do not push" everywhere she goes.
324–B	"Keroro, invader level check" (Japanese: ケロロ 侵略者度チェック であります)	July 25, 2010
Fuyuki and Natsumi end up in the Kero Ball again, where they have to answer several multiple-choice questions.
325–A	"Keroro, Version Up Model" (Japanese: ケロロ バージョンアップモデル であります)	July 31, 2010
The platoon start wearing bizarre body paint to make others pay attention to them.
325–B	"Keroro, the make up used is the self" (Japanese: ケロロ お化粧するは我にあり であります)	August 1, 2010
Keroro uses makeup to manipulate the feelings of women.
326–A	"Chibi Kero, fireworks from that summer" (Japanese: ちびケロ あの夏の花火であります)	August 7, 2010
Keroro flashes back to a childhood memory when Chibi Zeroro was too sick to go see the fireworks, so Chibi Keroro and his friends try to bring him there themselves.
326–B	"Keroro, Swimsuit Beauties Contest!" (Japanese: ケロロ 水着美女コンテスト! であります)	August 8, 2010
The platoon enters a swimsuit competition at the beach.
327–A	"Keroro, super hero!" (Japanese: ケロロ 正義の味方! であります)	August 14, 2010
After stopping a robber while wearing one of his Pekoponian Suits, everyone thinks Keroro is a superhero.
327–B	"Keroro, invasion in a blink!" (Japanese: ケロロ あっというまの侵略! であります)	August 15, 2010
Keroro hears about an important treaty being signed, and decides to swap it out with a document signing control of Pekopon over to him.
328–A	"Momoka, becoming normal!" (Japanese: 桃華普通にしやがれ! であります)	August 21, 2010
Momoka wishes she had a normal life. Keroro shows her what that would be like by placing her in a few simulated scenarios.
328–B	"Paul's day off" (Japanese: ポールの休日 であります)	August 22, 2010
Tamama sees Paul leaving the Nishizawa mansion, presumably forever. The platoon follows him around, and they come to the conclusion that he is secretly a master criminal.
329–A	"Fuyuki worried!" (Japanese: 冬樹気になる! であります)	August 28, 2010
At a special dinner with Momoka's father, Fuyuki notices that the man has a distracting hair sticking out of his nose. He struggles over whether he should point it out, or pretend that it isn't there.
329–B	"Natsumi, the ocean isn't large or big" (Japanese: 夏美海は広いな大きいな であります)	August 29, 2010
Natsumi loses her top while out swimming with her friends.
330–A	"556, unluckiest partner" (Japanese: 556 史上最凶の相棒であります)	September 4, 2010
Giroro is forced to spend a day with Kogoro.
330–B	"Koyuki, first curry" (Japanese: 小雪 初めてのカレーであります)	September 5, 2010
Kururu teaches Koyuki how to make curry.
331–A	"Natsumi, one week without anger" (Japanese: 夏美怒ってはいけない一週間であります)	September 11, 2010
Keroro forces Natsumi to go an entire week without getting angry.
331–B	"Keroro, invasion is a second stomach?" (Japanese: ケロロ侵略はベツバラ?であります)	September 12, 2010
The platoon puzzles over a mysterious part of the body known as a "dessert stomach".
332–A	"Fuyuki, butterfly person appears?" (Japanese: 冬樹蝶人出現?であります)	September 18, 2010
Fuyuki comes across the infamous Mothman.
332–B	"Giroro, uninvited guest" (Japanese: ギロロ招かざる客であります)	September 19, 2010
A Keronian fugitive known as Darere is suspected to be hiding on Pekopon.
333–A	"Momoka, mood of the starry sky" (Japanese: 桃華星空の気持ちであります)	September 25, 2010
While at the planetarium, Fuyuki is possessed by its projector.
333–B	"Keroro, little hair of luck" (Japanese: ケロロ福毛ちゃんであります)	September 26, 2010
Keroro learns about the concept of a "lucky hair" when he discovers one growing on his body. He tries to increase his luck by treating the hair with respect.
334–A	"Keroro, clash, star circular violence tool tournament" (Japanese: ケロロ 激突☆暴輪具大会であります)	October 2, 2010
Keroro converts the base into a bowling alley.
334–B	"Keroro, My Super Decisive Plan!?" (Japanese: ケロロ 我輩、超決断計画!?であります)	October 3, 2010
The others have finally had enough of Keroro's constant failures, leaving him to come up with his most brilliant plan all by himself.
335–A	"Keroro, leader representative robot launches!" (Japanese: ケロロ 隊長代理ロボ出動!であります)	October 9, 2010
Keroro orders a robotic commander to fill in for him.
335–B	"Keroro, the moon is luxurious!" (Japanese: ケロロ 月は豪華だ! であります)	October 10, 2010
The Hinata family enjoys a luxurious vacation on the moon.
336–A	"Dororo, ninja approaching the shadow" (Japanese: ドロロ 忍び寄る影 であります)	October 16, 2010
Zoruru returns, and demands to have a showdown with Dororo. Dororo must enter the Assassin Zone and defeat his dreaded rival once and for all.
336–B	"Natsumi, exploration of the construction of the Hinata residence" (Japanese: 夏美 日向家建物探訪 であります)	October 17, 2010
A famous space television star named Atanabe Watsushi is coming to the Hinata house, so Keroro turns it into an obstacle course.
337–A	"Keroro, Flowers for Algernainon" (Japanese: ケロロ アルジャナイノンに花束を であります)	October 23, 2010
337–B	"Giroro, oh! Ferocious Ox" (Japanese: ギロロ Oh!モウギュウ であります)	October 24, 2010
Giroro is turned into a large, angry ox, bent only on causing destruction.
338–A	"Koyuki, day of Halloween" (Japanese: 小雪 ハロウィンの日 であります)	October 30, 2010
Koyuki celebrates Halloween for the first time, and also makes friends with a poltergeist. Meanwhile, Dororo searches for candy to hand out.
338–B	"Koyuki vs Alisa, duel of the ocean depths" (Japanese: 小雪VSアリサ 深海の決闘 であります)	October 31, 2010
Koyuki's new friend possesses Keroro, Kururu, and Tamama, giving them strange new powers. Alisa wants to destroy the ghost, which Koyuki is very much against.
339–A	"Keroro, red light of fear" (Japanese: ケロロ 恐怖の赤信号 であります)	November 6, 2010
After being inconvenienced by a stoplight, Keroro has them installed all throughout the house.
339–B	"Keroro, Invasion Plus Minus" (Japanese: ケロロ 侵略プラスマイナスであります)	November 7, 2010
Keroro starts investing most of his time into a simulated invasion game, where he performs numerous cruel acts on Natsumi.
340–A	"Aki, real ramen" (Japanese: 秋本当のラーメン であります)	November 13, 2010
The platoon opens up their own ramen cart, with Aki as their taste tester.
340–B	"Joriri, false ramen" (Japanese: ジョリリ 偽りのラーメン であります)	November 14, 2010
After having their ramen rejected, Joriri drops by to give the platoon useless advice on how to make it better.
341–A	"Keroro, restroom survival!" (Japanese: ケロロ トイレでサバイバル! であります)	November 20, 2010
Keroro is locked in the bathroom.
341–B	"Keroro vs Giroro vs Tamama vs Dororo" (Japanese: ケロロ 対ギロロ対タママ対ドロロ であります)	November 21, 2010
Everyone fights over who gets to use the last empty stall.
342–A	"Keroro, Birth! New Final Technique!" (Japanese: ケロロ 誕生!新必殺技! であります)	November 27, 2010
Keroro learns a new special move.
342–B	"Natsumi going through" (Japanese: 夏美 ツツヌケ であります)	November 28, 2010
Keroro causes trouble with his "butt ventriloquism", which only Natsumi can decipher.
343–A	"556, the Space Sheriff!" (Japanese: 556 宇宙刑事だっ!)	December 4, 2010
Kogoro takes an entrance exam so he can join the space police.
343–B	"Lavie, leave it to me" (Japanese: ラビー におまかせであります)	December 5, 2010
Lavie is the only one who can save the day when everyone else is turned into balls for Viper's lottery raffle.
344–A	"Pururu, Pekopon love tour" (Japanese: プルル めぐり愛ペコポンであります)	December 11, 2010
Bariri is heartbroken when he finds out that Pururu is being reassigned to another planet. He has one last chance to tell her about his feelings at her farewell party.
344–B	"Alisa & Momoka, women's battle" (Japanese: アリサ&桃華 女の戦いであります)	December 12, 2010
Momoka grows jealous when she sees Fuyuki spending time with Alisa.
345–A	"Keroro vs Giroro, duel in the cold rain!" (Japanese: ケロロVSギロロ 氷雨の中の決闘!であります)	December 18, 2010
The others must prevent Keroro from gaining favor with Natsumi.
345–B	"Keroro platoon, big year-end party" (Japanese: ケロロ小隊 大忘年会であります)	December 19, 2010
Kururu's new "BureiCola" causes trouble when he passes it out at the New Year's party.
346–A	"Keroro, rejected Operation Bouquet" (Japanese: ケロロ ボツ作戦に花束をであります)	December 25, 2010
Keroro and friends must fight the physical manifestation of all of their rejected plans.
346–B	"Keroro, dear Natsumi" (Japanese: ケロロ 拝啓夏美殿であります)	December 26, 2010
Keroro loses his physical body after a hyperspace incident.
347–A	"Keroro, invader's aura" (Japanese: ケロロ 侵略者のオーラ であります)	December 31, 2010
A Keronian with a very strong aura named Orara comes to Pekopon, and Keroro tries to take advantage of his amazing powers.
347–B	"Dororon? Tamama-kun" (Japanese: ドロロ ン? タママくん であります)	January 1, 2011
While trying to fix one of Keroro's toys, Tamama gets himself stuck to Dororo. Dororo disguises himself as a hat while Tamama struggles over whether or not to tell Keroro the truth.
348–A	"Fuyuki, Birth! Jerseyman Fuyuki" (Japanese: 冬樹誕生・ジャージマン冬樹 であります)	January 2, 2011
Keroro gets a jersey from one of his favorite TV shows in the mail. Fuyuki puts it on and starts acting crazy.
348–B	"Keroro, the great throat candies" (Japanese: ケロロ素敵ナの雨 であります)	January 8, 2011
Kururu invents magic cough drops that cause everyone to add verbal tics to the ends of their sentences.
349–A	"Keroro, invading daily life" (Japanese: ケロロ 日常を侵略せよ であります)	January 15, 2011
Keroro's new "Shuffle Button" causes all electronic devices in the house to go haywire.
349–B	"Keroro, hooray for reset" (Japanese: ケロロ リセット万歳 であります)	January 22, 2011
Keroro resets people's memories by using Kururu's headphones.
350–A	"Mois, chronicle of uncle's hard battles" (Japanese: モア オジサマ奮闘記 であります)	January 29, 2011
Mois fills in for her uncle.
350–B	"Aki VS Cat, mixed martial arts match" (Japanese: 秋×ネコ 異種格闘技戦！ であります)	February 5, 2011
Aki is intent on keeping Giroro's cat out of the house.
351–A	"This time is Gero Gero 15 minutes" (Japanese: こんどはゲロゲロ15分 であります)	February 12, 2011
Another collection of short segments.
351–B	"Giroro, show me!" (Japanese: ギロロ 見せてくれ！! であります)	February 13, 2011
Giroro is mad that his story got cut from the last episode, so he asks to see more.
352–A	"Nabebe, Yaminabe magistrate!" (Japanese: ナベベ 闇鍋奉行！! であります)	February 19, 2011
A Keronian named Nabebe relaxes everyone with his cooking.
352–B	"Natsumi, 623's identity" (Japanese: 夏美 623の正体 であります)	February 20, 2011
Natsumi believes that 623's true identity is actually Giroro, so she starts acting nicer to him.
353–A	"Spirit-chan, I'll rest in peace" (Japanese: 幽霊ちゃん 私成仏します であります)	February 26, 2011
The ghost that lives in the basement decides that it's time for her to move on.
353–B	"Giroro, even after dreaming time" (Japanese: ギロロ 夢見る頃を過ぎても であります)	February 27, 2011
Giroro is placed into a dream world to prevent him from interfering with a plan to humiliate Natsumi.
354–A	"Keroro, visitor from the future" (Japanese: ケロロ 未来からの訪問者であります)	March 5, 2011
A Keronian from the future comes to help out with the invasion, but he is even lazier than Keroro.
354–B	"623, tragedy of the radio star" (Japanese: 623 ラジオスターの悲劇であります)	March 6, 2011
623 announces that he is ending his show and returning home to Venus. Natsumi makes one last attempt to find out who he really is.
355–A	"Ouka resigns!" (Japanese: 桜華 引退! であります)	March 13, 2011 (Note: March 19, 2011 for 15 minutes version)
Momoka's mother returns to spend more time with her daughter.
355–B	"Keroro must survive" (Japanese: ケロロ 君は生き残ることが出来るか であります)	March 13, 2011
Keroro and his friends must infiltrate Area 51 to rescue a Keronian that is being held there.
356–A	"Keroro platoon, real Dragon Warriors" (Japanese: ケロロ小隊 真ドラゴンウォリアーズ であります)	March 26, 2011
When the Garuru Platoon is attacked by a mysterious force, Keroro and his friends must become dragons again to save the day.
356–B	"Mois, that one other person's spring" (Japanese: モア もうひとりへの春 であります)	March 27, 2011
Mois helps out her Pekoponian double with a test.
357	"Hinata family, Haru returns" (Japanese: 日向家 春、帰還 であります)	April 2, 2011
The platoon's Pekoponian friends are invited to Keron for a vacation, unaware that this is actually a plot by HQ to eliminate all threats to their invasion.
358–A	"Keroro, The world's Sgt. Keroros" (Japanese: ケロロ 世界のケロロ軍曹 であります)	April 3, 2011
Keroro uses Dororo's Clone Jutsu technique to create various international copies of himself.
358–B	"Keroro, Keron Army Style excursion great opening!" (Japanese: ケロロ ケロン軍式遠足大公開! であります)	April 3, 2011
Keroro takes his friends on an excursion to the park, where the series comes to an end as everyone has a nice picnic together.
