= Sgt. Frog season 5 =

Season of television series

Sgt. Frog
- Season 5
- Cover of the first DVD volume by Bandai Visual, featuring Sergeant Keroro
- No. of episodes: 51

Release
- Original network: TV Tokyo
- Original release: April 5, 2008 – March 28, 2009

Season chronology
- ← Previous; Season 4 Next → Season 6

The fifth season of the Sgt. Frog anime series consists of the fifty-one episodes after episode two-hundred-and-five from the series, which first aired in Japan from April 5, 2008, to March 28, 2009, on TV Tokyo. Season 5 uses 5 songs: 2 Openings and 3 Endings. "Nante Suteki na Doyōbi" (なんて素敵な土曜日; "What a Wonderful Saturday") by Keroro Platoon is used as the opening from episode 206 to 231. "Hello Darwin! ~Kōkishin On Demand~" (ハローダーウィン! 〜好奇心オンデマンド〜, Harō Dāwin! ~Kōkishin On Demando~; "Hello Darwin! ~Curiosity On Demand~") by JAM Project is used as the opening from episode 232 to 256. "Omatase Pekopon Itchō!" (おまたせ地球一丁（ペコポンいっちょう）!; "Here's Pekopon for You!") by the Keroro Platoon is used as the ending from episode 206 to 218. "Bokura no Aikotoba" (僕らの合言葉; "Our Password") by Natsumi Kiyoura is used as the ending from episode 219 to 244. "Kekkekkeroro no Daisakusen" (ケッケッケロロの大作戦♪; Ke-Ke-Keroro's Big Plan) by the Keroro Platoon is used as the ending from episode 245 to 256.

== Episode list ==
No.	Title	Original release date
206	"Keroro Platoon, Start the Color Operation!!/Dororo, Do You Like Natto?"; Transliteration: "Keroro Shōtai Iroiro Sakusen Kaishi!! de Arimasu/Dororo Nattō wa Osuki? de Arimasu" (Japanese: ケロロ小隊 色々作戦開始！！ であります/ドロロ 納豆はお好き？ であります)	April 5, 2008
The platoon switches their colors around just to spice things up. Dororo likes natto, so he convinces Keroro to use it as part of an invasion plan.
207	"Keroro, Build A Company!/Ouka, Come With Cherry Blossoms"; Transliteration: "Keroro Kaisha o Tsukurou! de Arimasu/Sakura Sakura Totomoni Kuru de Arimasu" (Japanese: ケロロ 会社を作ろう！ であります/桜華 桜と共に来る であります)	April 12, 2008
Keroro and friends start their own company with Keroro as the president. Keroro soon learns that being the leader of a company is harder than it looks. Momoka is worried that her mother won't make it home before the last cherry blossoms fall, so Keroro and Tamama try to find ways to prevent them from falling.
208	"Giroro, A Man's Backup/Keroro, Great Economical Mobile Operation!"; Transliteration: "Giroro Otoko no Bakkuappu de Arimasu/Keroro Oena Keitai Daisakusen! de Arimasu" (Japanese: ギロロ オトコのバックアップ であります/ケロロ お得な携帯大作戦！ であります)	April 19, 2008
Keroro downloads an illegal video file that contains a deadly space computer virus. Giroro must go into cyberspace to prevent it from spreading its mischief to the rest of the world. The platoon creates a new cell phone with some unusual features.
209	"Koyuki, I'll Stop Being A Shinobi"; Transliteration: "Koyuki Shinobi, Yame Masu de Arimasu" (Japanese: 小雪 忍び、やめます であります)	April 26, 2008
An old friend of Koyuki's from her ninja village, Shigure, offers to let her join his new group, one where she can hone her ninja skills without having to hide them from modern society.
210	"Natsumi, Disturbance After School/Aki, Children's Day"; Transliteration: "Natsumi Konwaku no Hōkago de Arimasu/Aki Kodomo no Hi de Arimasu" (Japanese: 夏美 困惑の放課後 であります/秋 子供の日 であります)	May 3, 2008
On her way home from school, Natsumi is abducted by aliens who take advantage of people's confusion. Aki is turned into a child after a mishap with Kururu's age-changing gun.
211	"Musha Kero, Volume 1: Legendary Hero"; Transliteration: "Musha Kero Ichi no Maki Densetsu no Yūsha de Gozasōrō" (Japanese: 武者ケロ 壱の巻 伝説の勇者 でござ候)	May 10, 2008
Keroro and his friends travel to the planet Sengoku Ran, where they must collect the first of five ancient treasures that make up the "Ultimate Weapon".
212	"Keroro, Don't Look At That!/Kogoro vs. Space Superintendent"; Transliteration: "Keroro Soredake wa Minai de! de Arimasu/Kogorō tai Uchū Keishi de Arimasu" (Japanese: ケロロ それだけは見ないで！ であります/556 VS 宇宙警視 であります)	May 17, 2008
While training on the beach, Keroro and Giroro both remember that they left a photo of Natsumi at the house. Space Detective K is on the lookout for an escaped felon, so he possesses Kogoro to accomplish his mission.
213	"Momoka, Reclaim Tomorrow!"; Transliteration: "Momoka Ashita o Torimodose! de Arimasu" (Japanese: 桃華 明日を取り戻せ！ であります)	May 23, 2008
Momoka is planning to open an amusement park to impress Fuyuki, but she gets caught up in a time loop that prevents the grand opening from coming.
214	"Kululu, I Quit/Pururu, Nurse In Love"; Transliteration: "Kururu Yame Masu de Arimasu/Pururu Koisuru Kangohei de Arimasu" (Japanese: クルル やめます であります/プルル恋する看護兵 であります)	May 31, 2008
Kururu leaves the platoon and ends up joining the Nishizawa family. Keroro and Giroro are convinced that Pururu is secretly in love with Joriri.
215	"Keroro, The Eight Wettle Kings/Keroro, Gamma 3's Big Wet Idea"; Transliteration: "Keroro Hachinin no Wettoru Kingu de Arimasu/Keroro Gama Sangō Wetto Sakusen de Arimasu" (Japanese: ケロロ 8人のウェットルキング であります/ケロロ ガマ3号ウェット作戦 であります)	June 7, 2008
During a battle with an army of Wettol Kings, Natsumi is saved by a mysterious, handsome stranger. A Nyororo merges with the Wettol Kings and turns them into evil hybrid creatures.
216	"Keroro, Compression Invasion?/Fuyuki, Legendary Things in The Hinata House"; Transliteration: "Keroro Asshuku de Shinryaku? de Arimasu/Fuyuki Hinataka Zaihō Densetsu de Arimasu" (Japanese: ケロロ 圧縮で侵略？ であります/冬樹 日向家財宝伝説 であります)	June 14, 2008
Kururu invents a device that can compress things that Keroro hasn't finished yet. Fuyuki finds an old book that contains instructions on how to find treasure.
217	"Chibi Kero, The Forbidden Game/Keroro, Frightening Invaders"; Transliteration: "Chibi Kero Kinjirareta Asobi de Arimasu/Keroro Kyōfu no Shinryakusha de Arimasu" (Japanese: ちびケロ 禁じられた遊び であります/ケロロ 恐怖の侵略者 であります)	June 21, 2008
The Chibi Kero Platoon fools around with Zeroro's new copy robot. Keroro plans on getting Pururu to touch it so he can practice admitting his love for her. Keroro is forced to take a fire prevention course.
218	"Chibi Kero, Whisper of the Heart/Keroro, Caries War 2"; Transliteration: "Chibi Kero Mimi o Sumaseba de Arimasu/Keroro Kariesu Wō Tsū de Arimasu" (Japanese: ちびケロ 耳をすませば であります/ケロロ カリエスウォー2 であります)	June 28, 2008
The Chibi Kero Platoon finds a discarded robot head in the trash. They decide to rebuild it. Keroro has a toothache again, so the others have to go back inside to cure it. However, there may be more to this toothache than it seems...
219	"Musha Kero, Volume Two: Outburst of Laughter, Sengoku Comedian War!"; Transliteration: "Musha Kero Ni no Maki Bakushō! Sengoku Owarai Kassen ni Gozasōrō" (Japanese: 武者ケロ・弐の巻 爆笑！ 戦国お笑い合戦 にござ候)	July 5, 2008
In the second Musha Kero adventure, everyone takes part in a Sengoku-styled comedy battle.
220	"Keroro, What is Global Warming?/Sababa, Devil King of The Desert"; Transliteration: "Keroro Chikyūondanka tte Nani? de Arimasu/Sababa Sabaku no Maō de Arimasu" (Japanese: ケロロ 地球温暖化ってなぁに？ であります/サババ 砂漠の魔王 であります)	July 12, 2008
Dororo tries to warn his friends about global warming. The platoon comes across an ancient civilization of sand creatures while exploring a pyramid.
221	"Momoka, Decision on Sunday/Giroro, Decision on Sunday"; Transliteration: "Momoka Kessen wa Nichiyōbi de Arimasu/Giroro Kessen wa Nichiyōbi de Arimasu" (Japanese: 桃華 決戦は日曜日 であります/ギロロ 決戦は日曜日 であります)	July 19, 2008
Momoka is determined to keep anything from ruining her date. Taking place at the same time as the previous episode, Giroro and Natsumi have an adventure of their own.
222	"Keroro, Fishing Rice Cookies on Rainy Days/Keroro, Memories and Fireworks"; Transliteration: "Keroro Ame no Hi wa Senbei Tsuri! de Arimasu/Keroro Omoide to Hanabi de Arimasu" (Japanese: ケロロ 雨の日はせんべい釣り！ であります/ケロロ 思い出と花火 であります)	July 26, 2008
Everyone tries to pass the time on a rainy day at Grandma's house. Keroro comes up with a plan to make the Hinata family see the fireworks.
223	"Momoka, Desert Island Full of Women/Keroro, Frightening Red Shoes Operation"; Transliteration: "Momoka Onna Darake no Jujintō de Arimasu/Keroro Kyōfu no Akai Kutsu Sakusen de Arimasu" (Japanese: 桃華 女だらけの無人島 であります/ケロロ 恐怖の赤い靴作戦 であります)	August 2, 2008
Momoka, Natsumi, and Koyuki end up on a deserted island with Natsumi's classmates. Unfortunately, Keroro has ended up with them, too. Natsumi puts on a pair of red shoes that cause her to dance uncontrollably.
224	"Keroro, Celebrity Resort Dragnet"; Transliteration: "Keroro Serebu Rizōto Sōsa Mō de Arimasu" (Japanese: ケロロ セレブリゾート捜査網 であります)	August 9, 2008
When a disaster occurs at a fancy resort that the platoon is staying at, they get help in solving the case from a catlike inspector named Namennya, a parody of Horatio Caine.
225	"Tamama, Beautiful Dive!/Keroro, The Ultimate Pekoponian Suit"; Transliteration: "Tamama Utsukushiki Daibu! de Arimasu/Keroro Kyūkyoku no Pekoponjin Sūtsu de Arimasu" (Japanese: タママ 美しきダイブ！ であります/ケロロ 究極のペコポン人スーツ であります)	August 16, 2008
Tamama is afraid of jumping off the diving board at the pool. Keroro's new Pekoponian suit works a little too well, as it causes him to forget he's an alien.
226	"Fuyuki, From a Distant Ocean Came a Turtle"; Transliteration: "Fuyuki Tōi Umi kara Kita Kame de Arimasu" (Japanese: 冬樹 遠い海から来たカメ であります)	August 23, 2008
Fuyuki finds a turtle from outer space.
227	"Keroro and Natsumi, One Room"; Transliteration: "Keroro & Natsumi Hitotsu no Heya de Arimasu" (Japanese: ケロロ&夏美 ひとつの部屋 であります)	August 30, 2008
Keroro and Natsumi are trapped in an otherworldly space together.
228	"Meruru, Postal Ser～vice!/Fuyuki, A Break in the Parking Area"; Transliteration: "Meruru Yūbin de ～ su!/Fuyuki Paakingu Eria de Arimasu" (Japanese: メルル 郵便で～す！ であります/冬樹 パーキングエリアで一服 であります)	September 6, 2008
A Keronian mail lady named Meruru arrives on Earth with a message for Keroro. Keroro and Fuyuki end up at a rest stop for aliens.
229	"Keroro, Killer Fist of Words!/Saburo and Kululu, Silent Fight"; Transliteration: "Keroro Kotoba no Hissatsu Ken! de Arimasu/Saburō & Kururu Shizuka na Tatakai de Arimasu" (Japanese: ケロロ コトバの必殺拳！ であります/サブロー&クルル 静かな戦い であります)	September 13, 2008
A creature known as the Quietite comes to Earth and eliminates all sound. Saburo and the Quietite have one last battle.
230	"Momoka, Big Operation: Love Savings/Zeroro, I Finally Found Kikaka"; Transliteration: "Momoka Ai no Setsuyaku Sakusen de Arimasu/Zeroro Kikaka ga Yattekita de Arimasu" (Japanese: 桃華 愛の節約作戦 であります/ゼロロ キカカがやってきた であります)	September 20, 2008
Momoka has to devise a new plan to make Fuyuki fall in love with her while taking her budget into account. (Note: This is the last episode to feature Tomoko Kawakami as the voice of Fuyuki) Chibi Zeroro makes friends with a mysterious robot named Kikaka.
231	"Musha Kero: Volume 3, Big Explosion, Close Call For Princess Momo"; Transliteration: "Musha Kero San no Maki Daibakuhatsu! Momohime Kikiippatsu de Gozasōrō" (Japanese: 武者ケロ 参の巻 大爆発！桃姫危機一髪 でござ候)	September 27, 2008
The next ancient treasure for the Musha Keroro Platoon to collect is located in a town ruled by Princess Momo. It quickly becomes a rescue mission when she gets captured by the Vipers.
232	"Keroro, Board Robbing/Keroro, He～ro～es"; Transliteration: "Keroro Bōdorobō de Arimasu/Keroro Hīrōzu de Arimasu" (Japanese: ケロロ ボードロボー であります/ケロロ ひ～ろ～ず であります)	October 4, 2008
Keroro's flying board has gone missing. The platoon gains superpowers after eating some experimental curry.
233	"Aki, Editors are Strong!"; Transliteration: "Aki Henshūsha wa Tsuyoshi! de Arimasu" (Japanese: 秋 編集者は強し！ であります)	October 11, 2008
Aki helps a troubled young manga artist.
234	"Keroro, Operation TV Projector/Keroro, Invading with a How-To Book"; Transliteration: "Keroro Teroppu Daisakusen de Arimasu/Keroro Hautsū Hon de Shinryaku de Arimasu" (Japanese: ケロロ テロップ大作戦 であります/ケロロ ハウツー本で侵略 であります)	October 18, 2008
On-screen text starts affecting the real world. Keroro takes advice from Urere's new book on how to be a successful invader.
235	"Fuyuki and the Plesiosaur"; Transliteration: "Fuyuki to Shuchōryū de Arimasu" (Japanese: 冬樹 と 首長竜 であります)	October 25, 2008
Fuyuki goes to Lake Sashida to find the legendary lake monster, Sassie.
236	"Keroro, Chewing Gum?/Tamama, Tamamatango"; Transliteration: "Keroro Gamu Kamu? de Arimasu/Tamama Tamama Tango de Arimasu" (Japanese: ケロロ ガム噛む？ であります/タママ タママタンゴ であります)	November 1, 2008
Kururu creates a special kind of gum that relaxes the senses and makes Keroro a more competent invader. Tamama tries to hide the fact that he ate a potentially poisonous mushroom from the others.
237	"Musha Kero, Volume 4: Go West, Musha Kero Platoon"; Transliteration: "Musha Kero Yon no Maki Musha Kero Shōtai Nishi e! de Gozasōrō" (Japanese: 武者ケロ 四の巻 武者ケロ小隊 西へ！ でござ候)	November 8, 2008
The Musha Keroro Platoon takes to the high seas in search of the next treasure.
238	"Keroro, Attack! Hint Age Difference Ultra Hammer/Dororo, Big Change!"; Transliteration: "Keroro Atakku! Hinto de Tashi no Sa Urutora Hanmā de Arimasu/Dororo Daikaizō! de Arimasu" (Japanese: ケロロ アタック！ヒントで 年の差ウルトラハンマー であります/ドロロ 大改造！ であります)	November 15, 2008
The platoon competes on an intergalactic game show hosted by Dasonu Maso. Tired of Dororo always rejecting his plans, Keroro has Kururu invent a device that makes Dororo agree with everything they say. Unfortunately, this makes Dororo into a laid-back, English-speaking annoyance.
239	"Natsumi, Is it A Love Triangle?/Pururu, Big Marriage Meeting Plan!"; Transliteration: "Natsumi Moshikashite Sankaku Kankei? de Arimasu/Pururu Omiai Daisakusen! de Arimasu" (Japanese: 夏美 もしかして三角関係？ であります/プルル お見合い大作戦！ であります)	November 22, 2008
Natsumi is afraid that Saburo is in a relationship with Koyuki. Pururu has been set up in an arranged marriage with a Keronian named Bariri. She has no interest in a romantic relationship, however, so she has to figure out how to tell him without hurting his feelings.
240	"Kululu, Sergeant Major's Special Mission/Keroro, Morning of Legends"; Transliteration: "Kururu Tokumei Sōchō de Arimasu/Keroro Densetsu no Asa de Arimasu" (Japanese: クルル 特命曹長 であります/ケロロ 伝説の朝 であります)	November 29, 2008
Keroro is convinced that Kururu has some sort of secret mission planned. Keroro waits outside of a video game store all night.
241	"Kogoro, I Can't Tell You Right Now/Keroro, Vacuum Cleaner Forever!"; Transliteration: "Kogorō Ima wa Ienai de Arimasu/Keroro Sōjiki yo Eien nare! de Arimasu" (Japanese: 556 今は言えない であります/ケロロ 掃除機よ永遠なれ！ であります)	December 6, 2008
Keroro serves as a bodyguard for Kogoro and Lavie. Keroro turns the vacuum cleaner into a human.
242	"Keroro, Ceiling Walker/Keroro, Self-Consciousness Invasion"; Transliteration: "keroro Yaneura no Sanposha de Arimasu/Keroro Jiishikikajō de Shinryaku! de Arimasu" (Japanese: ケロロ 屋根裏の散歩者 であります/ケロロ 自意識過剰で侵略！ であります)	December 13, 2008
Keroro ends up in a mysterious space in the ceiling, where he plays pranks on his friends. Everyone starts to feel like they are being watched.
243	"Keroro, Merry Christmas on the Battlefield"; Transliteration: "Keroro Senjō wa Merī Kurisumasu de Arimasu" (Japanese: ケロロ 戦場はメリークリスマス であります)	December 20, 2008
The Keronian God of Destruction, Kiruru, comes to Earth and threatens to ruin Christmas.
244	"Keroro, Graffiti Dweller/Keroro, New Year's Eve Bustle"; Transliteration: "Keroro Rakugaki no Jūnin de Arimasu/Keroro Toshikoshi Daisōdō de Arimasu" (Japanese: ケロロ 落書きの住人 であります/ケロロ 年越し大騒動 であります)	December 27, 2008
Keroro is turned into living graffiti by the "Graffiti Dwellers", and starts making mean drawings of his friends. Keroro, who is still a drawing, is left behind while everyone else enjoys the New Year. He tries to find ways to make himself useful, but they all fail.
245	"Keroro, New Year's Invasion Operation!/Kogoro, Scratched Helmet"; Transliteration: "Keroro Hatsu Shinryaku Sakusen! de Arimasu/Kogorō Kizutsuita Herumetto de Arimasu" (Japanese: ケロロ 初侵略作戦！ であります/556 傷ついたヘルメット であります)	January 3, 2009
Urere gives Keroro tips on how to complete a successful invasion. Keroro and his friends complete each task, and it seems as though they have finally finished their task. Or have they? Kogoro becomes depressed after ruining his helmet.
246	"Giroro, Special Gargling Training!/Keroro, Kero-Eraser!"; Transliteration: "Giroro Ugai Mōtokkun!/Keroro Kero Keshi! de Arimasu" (Japanese: ギロロ うがい猛特訓！ であります/ケロロ ケロ消し！ であります)	January 10, 2009
Giroro doesn't know how to gargle, so the others teach him how. The platoon creates their own erasers.
247	"Mois, Lipstick Slapstick/Keroro, Get Out! Keron Bar Field"; Transliteration: "Moa Rippusutikku Surappusutikku de Arimasu/Keroro Dasshutsu! Keron Bā Fīrudo de Arimasu" (Japanese: モア リップスティック・スラップスティック であります/ケロロ 脱出！ ケロンバーフィールド であります)	January 17, 2009
Mois decides to try on lipstick for the first time, and soon the entire house is obsessed with wearing makeup. Keroro and friends have to fight a space chupacabra.
248	"Keroro, Don't Call Me Mommy/Masayoshi Yoshiokadaira: That Delusion is Mine!"; Transliteration: "Keroro Mama to Yobanai de de Arimasu/Yoshiokadaira Masayoshi Mōsō suru wa Waga ni Ari! de Arimasu" (Japanese: ケロロ ママと呼ばないで であります/吉岡平正義 妄想するは我にあり！ であります)	January 24, 2009
Keroro wakes up one night to find a baby in his bed. Young Masayoshi of the Momoka Protection Squad loses his confidence.
249	"Musha Kero, Volume 5: Keronian of the Hidden Fortress"; Transliteration: "Musha Kero Go no Maki Kakushi Toride no Keronjin de Gozasōrō" (Japanese: 武者ケロ・伍の巻 隠し砦のケロン人 でござ候)	February 7, 2009
During their search for the final treasure, the platoon is captured by Viper and forced to work as slaves. Meanwhile, Dororo saves a young ninja named Yukino.
250	"Musha Kero, Volume 6: The Revived Hero!!"; Transliteration: "Musha Kero Roku no Maki Yomigaeru Yūsha de Gozasōrō!!" (Japanese: 武者ケロ•六の巻 蘇る勇者 でござ候)	February 14, 2009
The Musha Keroro Platoon has one final battle with the Viper Clan in order to complete the Ultimate Weapon.
251	"Kogoro and Kobayashi!"; Transliteration: "Kogorō to Kobayashi! de Arimasu" (Japanese: 556と5884！ であります)	February 21, 2009
Kogoro adopts a cute space creature as a pet, unaware that it is actually a vicious monster known as an "eatoilodon".
252	"Keroro, Let's Go to the Movies!"; Transliteration: "Keroro Eiga ni Yukou! de Arimasu" (Japanese: ケロロ 映画に行こう！ であります)	February 28, 2009
Keroro spends a day at the movies.
253	"Keroro, The Incredible Keroro/Keroro, Black-Phone Investigator 66"; Transliteration: "Keroro Chōjin Keroro de Arimasu/Keroro Kuro Denwa Sōsakan Rokujūroku de Arimasu" (Japanese: ケロロ 超人ケロロ であります/ケロロ 黒電話捜査官66 であります)	March 7, 2009
After a mishap with gamma rays, Keroro starts gaining super-strength. Keroro teams up with a telephone robot to find out who has been scamming him out of money.
254	"Fuyuki, Trunks versus Briefs/Garuru, Obscured Feelings!?"; Transliteration: "Fuyuki Torankusu tai Burīfu de Arimasu/Garuru Hisokanaru Omoi!? de Arimasu" (Japanese: 冬樹 トランクス対ブリーフ であります/ガルル 密かなる想い！？ であります)	March 14, 2009
After Fuyuki's mom buys him new underwear, he debates between sticking with briefs or changing to trunks. One pair of his briefs comes to life and talks to him. Garuru returns, and everyone thinks that he is hiding a secret crush on Pururu.
255	"Keroro, Frightening Darkness Plan!/Keroro, Frightening Whiteness Plan/Keroro, Frightening Time-Stop Plan!"; Transliteration: "Keroro Kyōfu no Dai Ankoku Sakusen! de Arimasu/Keroro Kyōfu no Dai Bihaku Sakusen! de Arimasu/Keroro Kyōfu no Dai Teishi Sakusen! de Arimasu" (Japanese: ケロロ 恐怖の大暗黒作戦！ であります/ケロロ 恐怖の大美白作戦！ であります/ケロロ 恐怖の大停止作戦！ であります)	March 21, 2009
Keroro's latest plan involves making everything pitch black. Keroro's next idea goes in the opposite direction by making everything extremely bright. Keroro tries one final desperate plan that involves slowing everything down.
256	"Fuyuki and Natsumi, Keroro Invasion!/Keroro, That's a～Lie♪"; Transliteration: "Fuyuki & Natsumi Keroro Shūrai! de Arimasu/Keroro Usso da Yōn♪ de Arimasu" (Japanese: 冬樹&夏美 ケロロ襲来！ であります/ケロロ ウッソだよ～ん♪ であります)	March 28, 2009
On April Fool's Day, Keroro plays an alien invasion prank on Fuyuki and Natsumi. Keroro is himself the victim of a prank on a Candid Camera-like show, which results in Fuyuki's computer getting sucked into a black hole. Keroro tries to tell Fuyuki what happened, but everyone else thinks he is just playing another prank.
