= Sgt. Frog season 6 =

Season of television series

Sgt. Frog
- Season 6
- Cover of the first DVD volume by Bandai Visual, featuring Sergeant Keroro.
- No. of episodes: 51

Release
- Original network: TV Tokyo
- Original release: April 4, 2009 – March 27, 2010

Season chronology
- ← Previous; Season 5 Next → Season 7

The sixth season of the Sgt. Frog anime series consists of the fifty-one episodes after episode two-hundred-and-fifty-six from the series, which first aired in Japan from April 4, 2009 to March 27, 2010 on TV Tokyo.

== Episode list ==
| No. | Title | Original release date |
|---|---|---|
| 257 | "Keroro, First Encounter Revisited!"; Transliteration: "keroro Daiichi Wa Kaitei! de Arimasu" (Japanese: ケロロ 第一話改訂！ であります) | April 4, 2009 |
To celebrate the show's sixth anniversary, Keroro decides to remake the first episode so it paints him in a more flattering light.
| 258 | "Keroro, Negative Thinking of Terror/Keroro, Grilled Meat Without Dignity"; Transliteration: "Keroro Kyōfu no Negativu Shinkingu de Arimasu/Keroro Jingi naki Yakiniku de Arimasu" (Japanese: ケロロ 恐怖のネガティヴシンキング であります/ケロロ 仁義なき焼肉 であります) | April 11, 2009 |
Keroro invents a device to make Pekoponians feel depressed. However, Natsumi breaks the device when he tries to blast her with it, and it ends up affecting him instead. Pururu has lunch with the platoon.
| 259 | "Koyuki, Cherry Blossom Trouble!"; Transliteration: "Koyuki Sakura Taihen! de Arimasu" (Japanese: 小雪 サクラ大変！ であります) | April 18, 2009 |
Koyuki takes everyone to see the cherry blossoms in her old village, but there doesn't seem to be any left.
| 260 | "Kero Zero, Keroro Platoon's Departure Last Night/Kero Zero, Keroro Platoon's First Mission"; Transliteration: "Kero Zero Keroro Shōtai Shuppatsu Zen'ya de Arimasu/Kero Zero Keroro Shōtai Fāsuto Misshon de Arimasu" (Japanese: ケロゼロ ケロロ小隊出発前夜 であります/ケロゼロ ケロロ小隊ファーストミッション であります) | April 25, 2009 |
On the day that they are supposed to leave for Pekopon, Keroro, Zeroro, and Giroro have forgotten the password to their secret base. The Keroro Platoon are finally united together for the first time, but Keroro has left the Kero Ball behind.
| 261 | "Momoka, The Big Seat Change Plan/Kogoro, My Feelings!"; Transliteration: "Momoka Seki Kae Daisakusen de Arimasu/Kogorō Ore no Omoi! de Arimasu" (Japanese: 桃華 席替え大作戦 であります/556 オレの想い！ であります) | May 2, 2009 |
Keroro disguises himself as a teacher yet again on a day when the students are supposed to change seats in class. An alien robs people of their most important memories.
| 262 | "Bariri, Loving Chief Medic/Keroro, Mother Looking Up In the Sky"; Transliteration: "Bariri Itoshi no Kangochō de Arimasu/Keroro Sora o Miagerya Ofukuro-san de Arimasu" (Japanese: バリリ 愛しの看護長 であります/ケロロ 空を見上げりゃお袋さん であります) | May 9, 2009 |
Bariri is reunited with Pururu after getting injured in battle. Keroro's mother comes to visit.
| 263 | "Keroro, Weevil That Grants Dreams/Keroro, Do Your Best, Trash Bag!"; Transliteration: "Keroro Yume o Kanaeru Zōmushi de Arimasu/Keroro Ganbare Gomibukuro! de Arimasu" (Japanese: ケロロ 夢をかなえるゾウムシ であります/ケロロ がんばれゴミ袋！ であります) | May 16, 2009 |
Keroro meets a wish-granting weevil. Natsumi falls in love with a living trash bag.
| 264 | "Keroro, the Space Digital Monster Attacks!/Keroro, Transform"; Transliteration: "Keroro Uchū Dejitaru Kaijū Shūrai! de Arimasu/Keroro Henshin de Arimasu" (Japanese: ケロロ 宇宙デジタル怪獣襲来！ であります/ケロロ 変身 であります) | May 23, 2009 |
Keroro and Lavie are taken control of by a monster that inhabits the digital space. Keroro turns into a Gundam model.
| 265 | "Giroro, Remote-Controlled Date/Keroro, Pu's Doubts"; Transliteration: "Giroro Rimokon de Dēto de Arimasu/Keroro Pū ga Ita Dōkutsu de Arimasu" (Japanese: ギロロ リモコンでデート であります/ケロロ プーがいた洞窟 であります) | May 30, 2009 |
Giroro uses mind-control on Natsumi to sabotage her date with Saburo. The platoon ends up on a deserted planet, where they meet a creature that grows larger when it eats.
| 266 | "Tamama, That Wake-Up Kiss is Mine/Pururu, Revealed Secret?!"; Transliteration: "Tamama Mezame no Kissu wa Boku no Mono de Arimasu/Pururu Barechatta Himitsu?! de Arimasu" (Japanese: タママ 目覚めのキッスは僕のもの であります/プルル ばれちゃった秘密?! であります) | June 6, 2009 |
Tamama wants to give Keroro a "wake-up kiss". Mois notices a wrinkle on Pururu's face, and tries to prevent anyone else from seeing it.
| 267 | "Keroro, Big Air Anything Operation/Keroro, Motel"; Transliteration: "Keroro Ea Nantoka Daisakusen! de Arimasu/Keroro Moteru de Arimasu" (Japanese: ケロロ エアなんとか大作戦！ であります/ケロロ モテる であります) | June 13, 2009 |
Keroro tries to control Pekopon by giving people virtual reality helmets to distract them. Keroro falls in love with a woman who loves Gundam as much as him.
| 268 | "Kero Zero, Enter Pekoponian Mecha Designer Kiko Katoyama"; Transliteration: "Kero Zero Pekoponjin Meka Dezainā Katoyama Kiko Tōjō de Arimasu" (Japanese: ケロゼロ ペコポン人 メカデザイナー カトヤマ・キコ 登場 であります) | June 20, 2009 |
On the way to Pekopon, the platoon hires Kiko Katayama to build their machines. Things become complicated when they encounter a shapeshifting creature known as "Butt Firecracker".
| 269 | "Momoka, Big Head Over Heels Operation/Giroro, Escape From Natsumi!"; Transliteration: "Momoka Horeta Hareta no Daisōdō de Arimasu/Giroro Natsumi kara no Dasshutsu! de Arimasu" (Japanese: 桃華 ホレたハレたの大騒動 であります/ギロロ 夏美からの脱出！ であります) | June 27, 2009 |
A love potion mishap causes everyone to fall in love with the first person (or object) they see. Natsumi gets sick from eating a space cheesecake, so Giroro dives into her stomach in order to cure her.
| 270 | "Chibi Kero vs. Chibi Fuyuki"; Transliteration: "Chibi Kero tai Chibi Fuyuki de Arimasu" (Japanese: ちびケロVSちび冬樹 であります) | July 4, 2009 |
Keroro, Dororo, Giroro, and Fuyuki are accidentally turned into children by one of Kururu's inventions.
| 271 | "Tamama, It's Hard Being an Upperclassman/Natsumi, We're All Boys!"; Transliteration: "Tamama Senpai wa Tsurai yo de Arimasu/Natsumi Bokutachi Otokonoko! de Arimasu" (Japanese: タママ 先輩はつらいよ であります/夏美 僕たち男の子！ であります) | July 11, 2009 |
Joriri joins the platoon, but quickly annoys everyone with his useless advice. Natsumi is accidentally turned into a boy.
| 272 | "Wettle King versus Kogoro/Three Weirdos, Smallest Showdown on Pekopon"; Transliteration: "Wettoru Kingu tai Kogorō! de Arimasu/San Daikaijin Pekopon Saishō no Kessen de Arimasu" (Japanese: ウェットルキング 対 556！ であります/三大怪人 ペコポン最小の決戦 であります) | July 18, 2009 |
Wettol King falls in love with Lavie, much to Kogoro's displeasure. They must soon learn to work together when Mecha Viper returns. Mecha Viper, Keroro, and Wettol King end up in a void, where there is only a single vending machine.
| 273 | "Keroro, Training is OK/Koyuki, Confrontation! Midsummer's Shore"; Transliteration: "Keroro Shikomi wa OK de Arimasu/Koyuki Taiketsu! Manatsu no Kaigan de Arimasu" (Japanese: ケロロ 仕込みはＯＫ であります/小雪 対決！真夏の海岸 であります) | July 25, 2009 |
A mysterious boy arrives from space who wants to learn to be a comedian. Another comedy contest is being held at the beach, except this time, Koyuki is the one who is turned into an adult.
| 274 | "Keroro Platoon, Under Keroro!"; Transliteration: "Keroro Shōtai Chinmoku no Keroro! de Arimasu" (Japanese: ケロロ小隊 沈黙のケロロ！ であります) | August 1, 2009 |
On a very hot day, Keroro transports the Hinata siblings to his secret summer paradise...an iceberg.
| 275 | "Keroro, Keron-Style Golf/Keroro, Run Keroro"; Transliteration: "Keroro Keron Shiki Gorufu de Arimasu/Keroro Hashire Keroro de Arimasu" (Japanese: ケロロ ケロン式ゴルフ であります/ケロロ 走れケロロ であります) | August 8, 2009 |
The platoon plays a lively game of golf. Kururu's new exercise bike has been sabotaged by Viper. While Keroro rushes off to find him, the others have to keep using it or else it will explode.
| 276 | "Keroro, The Admiral Attacks!/Giroro, It's This Zipper"; Transliteration: "Keroro Teitokudono Kyōshū! de Arimasu/Giroro Chakku wa Sonomama de de Arimasu" (Japanese: ケロロ 提督殿強襲！ であります/ギロロ チャックはそのままで であります) | August 15, 2009 |
Keroro switches Kururu and Natsumi's grandmother's bodies around. To get revenge on Keroro, Natsumi switches bodies with Keroro's mom. When she goes wandering off, Giroro has to keep an eye on her.
| 277 | "Kero Zero, Space Catering/Kero Zero, Formula for Eating"; Transliteration: "Kero Zero Uchū de Demae de Arimasu/Kero Zero Tabetai Hōteishiki de Arimasu" (Japanese: ケロゼロ 宇宙で出前 であります/ケロゼロ 食べたい方程式 であります) | August 22, 2009 |
Keroro orders take-out food, but finds out that doing so is forbidden. He must destroy the delivery vehicle before HQ finds out. Due to a water shortage, everyone is limited to flushing the toilet only once a day. The platoon has to resist using the toilet until they reach the next planet, even though they just ate a huge meal.
| 278 | "Ghost Girl, Before-After/Giroro, the Red Fairy"; Transliteration: "Yūrei-chan Bifō Afutā de Arimasu/Giroro Akai Yōsei de Arimasu" (Japanese: 幽霊ちゃん ビフォーアフター であります/ギロロ 赤い妖精 であります) | August 29, 2009 |
The ghost girl who lives in the basement wants other people to find her scary. One of Natsumi's classmates catches a glimpse of Giroro and thinks that he is Prince Charming.
| 279 | "Alisa's First Time with Mama!?"; Transliteration: "Arisa Hajimete no Mama!? de Arimasu" (Japanese: アリサ 初めてのママ!? であります) | September 5, 2009 |
Fuyuki is depressed that his mom is always at work, so the others ask Alisa to cheer him up.
| 280 | "Keroro & Natsumi, Ruthless Stamp Card/Keroro, Sad Kerobot"; Transliteration: "Keroro & Natsumi Hitoyoshi naki Sutanpu Kādo de Arimasu/Keroro Kanashimi no Kerobotto de Arimasu" (Japanese: ケロロ＆夏美 仁義無きスタンプカード であります/ケロロ 悲しみのケロボット であります) | September 12, 2009 |
Natsumi goes to the supermarket to fill out her stamp card, but Keroro is planning to do the same thing. Keroro wants Kururu to destroy the God Keron robot so there will be enough room for a new one. Kururu, unhappy that Keroro has no respect for his inventions, makes Keroro dream that he is a robot.
| 281 | "Keroro, Cicada Platoon/Keroro, Ribbit Day"; Transliteration: "Keroro Semi Shōtai de Arimasu/Keroro Kērō no Hi de Arimasu" (Japanese: ケロロ セミ小隊 であります/ケロロ ケーローの日 であります) | September 19, 2009 |
Keroro and his friends turn themselves into cicadas so that they can annoy the populace. A special day arrives where everyone has to be nice to Keronians.
| 282 | "Momoka, Sudden Dance of Flames/Kero Zero, All Quiet on the Fig Front"; Transliteration: "Momoka Totsuzen Honō no Gotoku de Arimasu/Kero Zero Ichijiku Sensen Ijō nashi de Arimasu" (Japanese: 桃華 突然炎のごとく であります/ケロゼロ イチジク戦線異常なし であります) | September 26, 2009 |
Paul reflects back on the day that Momoka and Tamama first met. Tamama becomes obsessed with eating figs.
| 283 | "Keroro, 5 Shocked Keronians/Fuyuki, Planet of the Humans"; Transliteration: "Keroro Gonin no Akireru Keronjin de Arimasu/Fuyuki Ningen no Wakusei de Arimasu" (Japanese: ケロロ 5人の呆れるケロン人 であります/冬樹 人間の惑星 であります) | October 3, 2009 |
The platoon are tasked with defending Giroro in court. A prehistoric creature moves in with the Hinatas.
| 284 | "Dororo, Farewell Platoon"; Transliteration: "Dororo Saraba Shōtai de Arimasu" (Japanese: ドロロ さらば小隊 であります) | October 10, 2009 |
Dororo cuts ties with the rest of the platoon when a new, evil commander takes charge. He tries to keep this a secret from Koyuki, but is forced to spill the beans when his friends are in danger.
| 285 | "Aki, Earth's Front Line of Defense/Natsumi, Tension! Parent's Classroom Visit"; Transliteration: "Aki Chikyūbōei Saizensen! de Arimasu/Natsumi Kinpaku! Jugyō Sankan de Arimasu" (Japanese: 秋 地球防衛最前線！ であります/夏美 緊迫！授業参観 であります) | October 17, 2009 |
Two Keronian criminals named Zurara and Gururu hold Keroro hostage, and Aki is the only one who can save him. Kururu fills in for Natsumi's mother on Open House Day.
| 286 | "Keroro, Careless Saturated Operation!/Keroro, Invasion! Softglon of Terror"; Transliteration: "Keroro Ukkari Bichobicho Daisakusen! de Arimasu/Keroro Shinryaku! Kyōfu no Sofutoguron de Arimasu" (Japanese: ケロロ うっかりビチョビチョ大作戦！ であります/ケロロ 侵略！恐怖のソフトグロン であります) | October 24, 2009 |
Keroro's latest plan involves making everyone extremely clumsy. Tamama has to save his friends from an invasion of evil ice cream.
| 287 | "Natsumi, Stop Those Hiccups～/Kero Zero, The one waiting on the Training Planet"; Transliteration: "Natsumi Shakkuri Tometē de Arimasu/Kero Zero Kunren Wakusei no Machibito de Arimasu" (Japanese: 夏美 しゃっくり止めて～ であります/ケロゼロ 訓練惑星の待ち人 であります) | October 31, 2009 |
The platoon tries to help Natsumi get rid of her hiccups. The platoon searches for a mysterious singer on the Training Planet.
| 288 | "Keroro, Kappa Legend/Keroro, Welcome Back"; Transliteration: "Keroro Kappa Densetsu de Arimasu/Keroro Okaerinasai de Arimasu" (Japanese: ケロロ カッパ伝説 であります/ケロロ おかえりなさい であります) | November 7, 2009 |
Keroro poses as a kappa so that he can get free DVDs and Gunpla models. Keroro's shirikodama has been removed from his body, leaving him disoriented and unable to do anything properly. Momoka and her squad find the object, but they're not going to give it up that easily.
| 289 | "Giroro, Red Devil of the Battlefield/Keroro, Is That Really a Lie?"; Transliteration: "Giroro Senjō no Akai Akuma de Arimasu/Keroro Sono Uso, Honto? de Arimasu" (Japanese: ギロロ 戦場の赤い悪魔 であります/ケロロ そのウソ、ホント？ であります) | November 14, 2009 |
Giroro is interviewed about his life as a soldier. Kururu's new device punishes people that tell lies.
| 290 | "Poyon, Miracle Paul Operation!/Kero Zero, Snow is a Merciless Queen of the Night"; Transliteration: "Poyon Pōru ni Mirakuru Daisakusen! de Arimasu/Kero Zero Yuki wa Mujihi na Yoru no Joō de Arimasu" (Japanese: ポヨン ポールにミラクル大作戦！ であります/ケロゼロ 雪は無慈悲な夜の女王 であります) | November 21, 2009 |
Space Officer Poyon falls in love with Paul. Tamama is displeased at having to carry K6000 around a snowy planet.
| 291 | "Alisa & Nevula, First Hot Spring/Keroro Platoon, Struggle! Torinoichi"; Transliteration: "Arisa & Nebura Hajimete no Onsen de Arimasu/Keroro Shōtai Funtō! Torinoichi de Arimasu" (Japanese: アリサ＆ネブラ 初めての温泉 であります/ケロロ小隊 奮闘！酉の市 であります) | November 28, 2009 |
Alisa has trouble fitting in at the hot springs. Keroro takes Fuyuki and Natsumi to celebrate the Day of the Rooster in Alien Town.
| 292 | "Natsumi, Secret of the Dresser/Keroro, You Were in my Dream"; Transliteration: "Natsumi Tansu no Himitsu de Arimasu/Keroro Yume no Naka ni Kimi ga Ite de Arimasu" (Japanese: 夏美 タンスの秘密 であります/ケロロ 夢の中に君がいて であります) | December 5, 2009 |
Natsumi finds a blob-like alien in her dresser. The platoon and Natsumi are trapped in a dream world.
| 293 | "Again Gero Gero 30 Minutes"; Transliteration: "Matamata Gerogero Sanjū Bun de Arimasu" (Japanese: またまたゲロゲロ30分 であります) | December 12, 2009 |
Another episode consisting of various short segments.
| 294 | "Yoshiokadaira, Bodyguard Elegy/Natsumi, Christmas Party Operation"; Transliteration: "Yoshiokadaira Shineitai Erejī de Arimasu/Natsumi Kurisumasu Kai Daisakusen de Arimasu" (Japanese: 吉岡平 親衛隊哀歌（エレジー） であります/夏美 クリスマス会大作戦 であります) | December 19, 2009 |
Yoshiokaidara resigns his position as one of Momoka's bodyguards. Natsumi is eager to ask Saburo to come to the Christmas party at her house. Meanwhile, Giroro tries to prevent this from happening.
| 295 | "Keroro, The Two of Us Are One Kerororm/Keroro, Mysterious Ultimate Weapon"; Transliteration: "Keroro Futari ga Hitori Kerorōmu! de Arimasu/Keroro Nazo no Saishū Heiki de Arimasu" (Japanese: ケロロ 二人が一人ケロロ～ム！ であります/ケロロ 謎の最終兵器 であります) | December 26, 2009 |
In a parody of Kamen Rider W, Keroro gets each member of the platoon to fuse with him. Keroro buys an expensive-looking robot, but he doesn't even know what its function is.
| 296 | "Keroro, New Year's Lucky Haste/Keroro, This Year Is Keron Year!"; Transliteration: "Keroro Shinnen Sōsō Rakkī de Arimasu/Keroro Kotoshi wa Kerontoshi! de Arimasu" (Japanese: ケロロ 新年早々 ラッキー であります/ケロロ 今年はケロン年！ であります) | January 2, 2010 |
Keroro tries to win the space postcard lottery. Giroro is entered in a race to become part of the Zodiac. His friends try sabotaging the other competitors to make sure he wins.
| 297 | "Keroro, Just One Chance/Dangale Lands"; Transliteration: "Keroro Chansu wa Ichido de Arimasu/Dangaru Daichi ni Tatsu de Arimasu" (Japanese: ケロロ チャンスは一度 であります/ダンガル 大地を立つ であります) | January 9, 2010 |
Keroro is intent on not missing any of his shows, no matter what happens to the Earth. Keroro and his friends build a giant snow sculpture of a Dangal that comes to life overnight.
| 298 | "Mois, Goodbye Pekopon/Saburo, The Mysterious Boy"; Transliteration: "Moa Sayonara Pekopon de Arimasu/Saburo Nazo Ōki Shōnen de Arimasu" (Japanese: モア さよなら ペコポン であります/サブロ 謎多き少年 であります) | January 16, 2010 |
After getting cheered up by Keroro, a depressed Mois finally has the courage to destroy the Earth. Fuyuki has a bizarre dream wherein he is attacked by various forms of Saburo.
| 299 | "Giroro, Take Down G-Force!/Giroro, G-Force's Counterattack"; Transliteration: "Giroro Jī o Taose! de Arimasu/Giroro Jī no Gyakushū de Arimasu" (Japanese: ギロロ Ｇを倒せ！ であります/ギロロ Ｇの逆襲 であります) | January 23, 2010 |
Giroro takes charge of a mission to keep out an invasion of Gs. Giroro and Natsumi wake up to discover that they have been turned into Gs. Now they must evade the efforts of the platoon to destroy them.
| 300 | "Onono, Illusionary Keron Soldier"; Transliteration: "Onono: Maboroshi no Keron hei de Arimasu" (Japanese: オノノ 幻のケロン兵 であります) | February 6, 2010 |
The platoon meets an elderly Keronian soldier named Onono who has been hiding on Pekopon for many years.
| 301 | "Tamama, Kicked Out Of The Nishizawa Family?/Momoka, Chocolate Cake of Love and Sadness"; Transliteration: "Tamama: Nishizawa ke Tsuihō? de Arimasu/Momoka: Ai to Kanashimi no Choko Keeki de Arimasu" (Japanese: タママ 西澤家追放？ であります/桃花 愛と悲しみのチョコケーキ) | February 13, 2010 |
Tamama gets booted from the Nishizawa family after eating a special chocolate heart that Momoka was planning to give to Fuyuki. Momoka is heartbroken when she sees what appears to be Pururu giving a box of chocolates to Fuyuki.
| 302 | "Keroro, I'm A Director!/Keroro & Fuyuki, Small Adventure In a Big City"; Transliteration: "Keroro: Wagahai wa Kantoku dzayo! de Arimasu/Keroro & Fuyuki Dai tokai no Chiisa na Bōken de Arimasu" (Japanese: ケロロ 我輩は監督ぢゃよ！ であります/ケロロ＆冬樹 大都会の小さな冒険 であります) | February 20, 2010 |
A movie producer from space named Chibaba wants to put Keroro and his friends on the big screen. He puts Keroro in charge as the director. Keroro wants to go see a movie called "Space Hammer Handstand Girl", so he has Fuyuki take him across town to the movie theater.
| 303 | "Kero Zero, My Home is Pekopon"; Transliteration: "Kero Zero: Kokyō wa Pekopon de Arimasu" (Japanese: ケロゼロ 故郷はペコポン) | February 27, 2010 |
After their ship is attacked by Viper, the platoon ends up on Pekopon for the first time.
| 304 | "Keroro, Please Give Me That Back!"; Transliteration: "Keroro: Soredake wa Kaeshi te Chōtai de Arimasu" (Japanese: ケロロ それだけは返してちょ～だい！ であります) | March 6, 2010 |
A little girl named Kana swipes Keroro's hat, and she doesn't want to return it.
| 305 | "Nobibi Came!"; Transliteration: "Nobibi ga kita! de Arimasu" (Japanese: ノビビ が来た！ であります) | March 13, 2010 |
Nobibi, a Keronian whom the platoon's old friend Kiko Katayama used to mention a lot, appears in the flesh on Pekopon.
| 306 | "Shugo Kero, Dokki Doki Party!/Dororo, Doro is Coming!"; Transliteration: "Shugo Kero, Dokki Doki Pāti! de Arimasu / Dororo: Doro rō ga kuru! de Arimasu" (Japanese: しゅごケロ どっき どき パーティ！ であります/ドロロ ドロ郎が来る！ であります) | March 20, 2010 |
Keroro's guardian angels show up and convince him to keep wasting his money on useless things. A space demon possesses Dororo and makes him subject his friends to horrible punishments.
| 307 | "Keroro & Fuyuki, Night of the Time Capsule"; Transliteration: "Keroro & Fuyuki: Taimu Kapuseru no Yoru de Arimasu" (Japanese: ケロロ＆冬樹 タイムカプセルの夜 であります) | March 27, 2010 |
Keroro accidentally loses an important piece of equipment in a time capsule.
