= Sgt. Frog season 4 =

Season of television series

Sgt. Frog
- Season 4
- Cover of the first DVD volume released by Bandai Visual featuring Sergeant Keroro and Private Second Class Tamama
- No. of episodes: 51

Release
- Original network: TV Tokyo
- Original release: 7 April 2007 – 29 March 2008

Season chronology
- ← Previous; Season 3 Next → Season 5

The fourth season of the anime series Sgt. Frog (Keroro Gunsō) comprises 51 episodes, numbered 155–205 overall. It aired in Japan on TV Tokyo from 7 April 2007 to 29 March 2008.

== Episode list ==
No.	Title	Original release date
155	"Keroro Platoon, Cut a Good Tune!/Keroro Platoon, Big Resonance!"; Transliteration: "Keroro Shōtai zekkōchō! de Arimasu/Keroro Shōtai Daikyōmei! de Arimasu" (Japanese: ケロロ小隊 絶好調！ であります/ケロロ小隊 大共鳴！ であります)	7 April 2007
Keroro tries to make his new song a success. The platoon tries perfecting their resonance in order to win a contest.
156	"Keroro, Unite! Keroro Robo/Keroro Invasion! Cherry Blossom Frontline Extreme!"; Transliteration: "Keroro Gattai! Keroro Robo de Arimasu/Keroro Shinryaku! Sakura Saizensen! de Arimasu" (Japanese: ケロロ 合体！ケロロロボ であります/ケロロ 侵略！桜最前線！ であります)	14 April 2007
The platoon uses their giant robots to fight Viper. Keroro plans to use the cherry blossom viewing area as a battlefield.
157	"Leave it to Chief Medic Pururu!/Natsumi, Today's Fortune"; Transliteration: "Pururu Kangochō ni Omakase!/Natsumi Kyō no Uranai de Arimasu" (Japanese: プルル 看護長におまかせ！ であります/夏美 今日の占い であります)	21 April 2007
Chief Medic Pururu arrives to give the platoon the results of their latest checkup. She puts a treatment plan in place to help them recover, which is particularly hard for Keroro, as he begins to suffer from withdrawal symptoms after being forced to give up his Gunpla. The platoon manipulates Natsumi by taking advantage of a horoscope.
158	"Keroro, Past Victories/Giroro, Exclude These Memories"; Transliteration: "Keroro Kako no Eikō de Arimasu/Giroro Kindan no Kioku de Arimasu" (Japanese: ケロロ 過去の栄光 であります/ギロロ 禁断の記憶 であります)	28 April 2007
The Keroro Platoon create a video showing off their various "successes" in trying to take over Pekapon. Keroro, Tamama, Dororo, and Pururu travel inside of Giroro's memories. Things take a turn for the worse, however, when Kururu starts inserting himself into each memory to mess with Giroro.
159	"Keroro, Climax! Card Battle/Keroro, the Targeted Platoon"; Transliteration: "Keroro Hakunetsu! Kādo Batoru/Keroro Nerawareta Shōtai de Arimasu" (Japanese: ケロロ 白熱！カードバトル であります/ケロロ 狙われた小隊 であります)	5 May 2007
Keroro's latest plan to invade Pekopon involves creating a Yu-Gi-Oh!-esque card game. Shurara, the leader of the Shurara Corps, has been watching over Keroro and his friends for quite some time. He goes over each member of the platoon and their weaknesses.
160	"Momoka, the Greatest Mother's Day"; Transliteration: "Momoka Saikyō no Haha no Hi de Arimasu" (Japanese: 桃華 最強の母の日 であります)	12 May 2007
Momoka's mother returns to check up on her daughter.
161	"Putata and Mekeke, Overzealous Killers"; Transliteration: "Putata & Mekeke Hissatsu Oshigotojin de Arimasu" (Japanese: プタタ＆メケケ 必殺お仕事人 であります)	19 May 2007
The first members of the Shurara Corps, Putata and Mekeke, arrive on Pekopon. Putata wreaks havoc with his living paintings, while Mekeke turns people into puppet slaves.
162	"Chibi Kero, That Time, Joriri"; Transliteration: "Chibi Kero Ano Koro Joriri de Arimasu" (Japanese: ちびケロ あのころジョリリ であります)	26 May 2007
Keroro remembers a time from his childhood days when he and his friends first met the strange old Keronian known as Joriri.
163	"Natsumi, Goodbye Saburo/Fuyuki and Alisa, The Rain Monster"; Transliteration: "Natsumi Sayonara Saburō de Arimasu/Fuyuki & Arisa Ame no Kaibutsu de Arimasu" (Japanese: 夏美 さよならサブロー であります/冬樹＆アリサ 雨の怪物 であります)	2 June 2007
When rumors start going around that 623 might be ending his radio show, Keroro seizes the opportunity to take over the airwaves for good. Fuyuki is being followed around by a mysterious rainstorm that only seems to be affecting him. With help from Alisa, he learns that an imaginary creature he created as a child has somehow escaped his mind and is causing these problems.
164	"Keroro, Nyororo Extinction?/Lavie, Goings of an Honorable Bride!"; Transliteration: "Keroro Nyororo Metsubō? de Arimasu/Rabī Oyome ni Ikimasu! de Arimasu" (Japanese: ケロロ ニョロロ滅亡？ であります/ラビー お嫁に行きます！ であります)	9 June 2007
Keroro and his crew go back in time to prevent the Nyororo from ever becoming a threat. Lavie falls in love with a handsome young man. But Kogoro is convinced that his sister is being tricked by a space alien in disguise. The Keroro Platoon tries to stop him from ruining their relationship, until it is revealed that this was all just part of a TV show that Lavie is appearing in.
165	"Kululu, Temporary Leader/Koyuki, Training as Usual"; Transliteration: "Kururu Rinji Taichō de Arimasu/Koyuki Futsū Mōtokkun de Arimasu" (Japanese: クルル 臨時隊長 であります/小雪 普通猛特訓 であります)	16 June 2007
Kururu has to take over as the leader when Keroro hurts his back. Unfortunately, an ambassador from space is also visiting that day. Koyuki takes lessons on how to be normal.
166	"Keroro, Crush! Wettol Robo/Keroro, Assault! Wettol Human"; Transliteration: "Keroro Kudake! Wettoru Robo de Arimasu/Keroro Totsugeki! Wettoru Hyūman de Arimasu" (Japanese: ケロロくだけ！ウエットルロボであります/ケロロ突撃！ウエットルヒューマンであります)	23 June 2007
Wettol King returns to battle Natsumi in a new, mechanical form.
167	"556, Cup Ramen Recipe/Keroro, Capture! Crossword"; Transliteration: "Kogorō Kappumen no Tsukurikata de Arimasu/Keroro Kōryaku! Kurosuwādo de Arimasu" (Japanese: ５５６ カップメンの作り方 であります/ケロロ 攻略！クロスワード であります)	30 June 2007
Kogoro tries to learn how to make cup noodles. The platoon becomes invested in a crossword puzzle.
168	"Keroro, Big Plan for Period Restriction/Momoka, My Limited Tanabata"; Transliteration: "Keroro Kikan Gentei Daishinryaku de Arimasu/Momoka Tanabata Gentei no Watashi de Arimasu" (Japanese: ケロロ 期間限定大侵略 であります/桃華 七夕限定の私 であります)	7 July 2007
Keroro's latest convoluted plan involves a gun that makes things "exclusive" so more people take notice of them. It turns out to be a surprising success. Momoka asks to be hit with the exclusivity gun so Fuyuki will finally take notice of her. Unfortunately, there is an unwanted side-effect: once each item that is hit with the gun stops being exclusive, it disappears. The platoon has to save her before she vanishes as well.
169	"Urere, King of the Trains/Giroro, Beautiful Girl and the Liquid Keronian"; Transliteration: "Urere Densha no Ōsama de Arimasu/Giroro Bishōjo to Ekitai Keronjin de Arimasu" (Japanese: ウレレ 電車の王様 であります/ギロロ 美少女と液体ケロン人 であります)	14 July 2007
Urere returns, but this time, he tries invading Pekopon with a train. Giroro is turned into liquid by the liquid Keronian, Giruru.
170	"Fuyuki and Keroro, Inaccurate! Seven Wonders/Pururu and Chiruyo, Secret Friends"; Transliteration: "Fuyuki & Keroro Abake! Nana Fushigi de Arimasu/Pururu & Chiruyo Himitsu no Tomodachi de Arimasu" (Japanese: 冬樹＆ケロロ あばけ！七不思議 であります/プルル＆散世 秘密の友達 であります)	21 July 2007
Keroro tries to solve the seven mysteries of Fuyuki's school. Pururu is discovered by Chiruyo, who thinks that she and Keroro are part of a husband-and-wife comedy duo.
171	"Tamama, To Rebel Is Regrettable/Kululu, When Was He a House Sitter?"; Transliteration: "Tamama Riyūnaki Hankō de Arimasu/Kururu to Orusuban? de Arimasu" (Japanese: タママ 理由なき反抗 であります/クルル と お留守番？ であります)	28 July 2007
Tamama has reached the stage of his life where he starts acting more rebellious. The others try to find a way to break him out of these new habits. Kururu is left behind by the others while they go on an important mission, so he spends his time bossing around Fuyuki and Natsumi.
172	"Alisa and Fuyuki, UMA Versus Dangal!"; Transliteration: "Arisa F fuyuki UMA tai Dangaru! de Arimasu" (Japanese: アリサ＆冬樹 ＵＭＡ対ダンガル！ であります)	4 August 2007
A Hollywood adaptation of Dangal is being made on the beach this year, and the winner of a cosplay contest will get to be in the movie. Meanwhile, Alisa is on the hunt for members of the Dark Race, one of which happens to be inhabiting the giant Dangal prop.
173	"Keroro, Yamato, and Kappa"; Transliteration: "Keroro Yamato to Kapū de Arinsu" (Japanese: ケロロ ヤマトとカプー でありんす)	11 August 2007
A young boy named Yamato mistakes Keroro for a kappa.
174	"Keroro, Butchered Hair, and the Afro Ondo?/Dororo, Mysterious Mountain"; Transliteration: "Keroro Buccha Ke, Afuro de ondo? de Arimasu/Dororo Fushigi no Yama de Arimasu" (Japanese: ケロロ ブッチャ毛、アフロで音頭？ であります/ドロロ 不思議の山 であります)	18 August 2007
Dasonu Maso is back yet again, and this time, he is planning to sap people of their energy by constantly repeating his catchphrase. Dororo is training in the mountains when he gets caught up in a bizarre otherworldly situation.
175	"Keroro, Dive! Vinyl Pool/Fuyuki and Natsumi, A New Day Is Here"; Transliteration: "Keroro Tobikome! Binīru Pūru de Arimasu/Fuyuki & Natsumi Atarashii Asa ga Kita de Arimasu" (Japanese: ケロロ 飛び込め！ビニールプール であります/冬樹＆夏美 新しい朝がきた であります)	25 August 2007
On a hot summer day, Keroro shrinks himself, the platoon, and Fuyuki, so that they have more room to swim around in a small kiddie pool. After a watermelon-related mishap, Fuyuki and Natsumi spend the morning exercising with Keroro, Tamama, and several other aliens.
176	"Chibi Kero, Goodbye Summer Vacation!"; Transliteration: "Chibi Kero Saraba Natsuyasumi! de Arimasu" (Japanese: ちびケロ さらば夏休み！ であります)	1 September 2007
Keroro remembers a time from his childhood when he spent all summer goofing around instead of doing his homework. When he tries to help Zeroro with his wilted morning glories, he instead ends up creating a giant plant monster.
177	"Dokuku, Gas Keronian Number One/Keroro, Pekopon's Number One Gunpla Boy"; Transliteration: "Dokuku Gasu Keronjin Daiichigō de Arimasu/Keroro Pekopon Ichi no Ganpura Otoko de Arimasu" (Japanese: ドクク ガスケロン人第１号 であります/ケロロ ペコポン一のガンプラ男 であります)	8 September 2007
The next member of the Shurara Corps, Dokuku, possesses Tamama and tries to use him to release his brother Giruru from captivity. Keroro aspires to become the president of the company that makes his favorite Gunpla models.
178	"Momoka and the Ghost, The Hinata Family's Phantom"; Transliteration: "Momoka Gōsuto Hinataka no Maboroshi de Arimasu" (Japanese: 桃華 ゴースト 日向家の幻 であります)	15 September 2007
Momoka is turned into a ghost by the platoon, and makes friends with the Hinata Family phantom.
179	"Keroro, Running An Election!/Natsumi and Giroro, The Two Who Can't Return"; Transliteration: "Keroro Shutsuba suru! de Arimasu/Natsumi & Giroro Kaerenai Futari de Arimasu" (Japanese: ケロロ 出馬する！ であります/夏美＆ギロロ 帰れない二人 であります)	22 September 2007
Keroro tries to become the mayor of Tokyo. A tear in the space-time continuum sends Giroro and Natsumi to a barren desert.
180	"Keroro, War is a Huge Hustle"; Transliteration: "Keroro Sōdatsu Daisensō de Arimasu" (Japanese: ケロロ 争奪大戦争 であります)	29 September 2007
Karara and Chiroro return again, this time fawning over Keroro. Tamama is not pleased by this, and he goes to war with the two of them. Meanwhile, Mois has found a perfect fault line in the backyard with which to bring about the end of the world.
181	"Mushishi, Search for the Insects!/Momoka, Three-Legged Race!"; Transliteration: "Mushishi Mushi no Idokoro o Sagase! de Arimasu/Momoka Sōdatsu! Nininsanyaku de Arimasu" (Japanese: ムシシ 虫の居所を探せ！ であります/桃華 争奪！二人三脚 であります)	6 October 2007
An elderly assassin named Mushishi comes to Pekopon for assistance in a plan involving insects. It's Sports Day again, and Momoka's mother is intent on participating in the events with her daughter.
182	"Keroro, Buried Treasure Special/Tamama versus Tamama"; Transliteration: "Keroro Maizōkin Supesharu de Arimasu/Tamama tai Tamama de Arimasu" (Japanese: ケロロ 埋蔵金スペシャル であります/タママ対タママ であります)	13 October 2007
Keroro bonks his head and dreams that he and Giroro are on a search for lost treasure. Tamama competes in various challenges against his copy robot.
183	"Garuru, Repeated Bother, Vacation"; Transliteration: "Garuru Hata Meiwaku na Bakēshon de Arimasu" (Japanese: ガルル はた迷惑なバケーション であります)	20 October 2007
Giroro's brother Garuru returns to Pekopon for a vacation. Giroro and the others try to make him feel as welcome as possible.
184	"Fuyuki, Burning Occult Article Ambition/Natsumi, Romeo and Juliet?"; Transliteration: "Fuyuki Moeagare Okaruto Bunkasai de Arimasu/Natsumi Romio to Jurietto? de Arimasu" (Japanese: 冬樹 燃え上がれオカルト文化祭 であります/夏美 ロミオとジュリエット？ であります)	27 October 2007
Fuyuki takes part in a festival themed around the occult. The school is putting on a production of Romeo and Juliet, and Natsumi has been cast in a lead role. Giroro desperately tries to join the cast so he can be on stage with his beloved Natsumi.
185	"Robobo, Big Mechanized Operation/Tamama, It's a Notebook"; Transliteration: "Robobo Kikaika Daisakusen de Arimasu/Tamama Nōto desū de Arimasu" (Japanese: ロボボ 機械化大作戦 であります/タママ ノートですぅ であります)	3 November 2007
Another member of the Shurara Corps, Robobo, arrives, and starts turning everyone into living appliances. Tamama finds a notebook that allows him to alter reality. But he gets more than he bargained for when he tries to use it on Momoka.
186	"Arisa vs. the Ghost, Aggression is the Lack of Progress"; Transliteration: "Arisa tai Yōkai Shinryaku ga Susumanai de Arimasu" (Japanese: アリサVS妖怪 侵略が進まない であります)	10 November 2007
Keroro learns about yokai from Fuyuki and plays tricks on the others by pretending to be the "Invasion Goes Nowhere" yokai. Unfortunately, his mask is actually a space parasite that takes control of his body.
187	"Keroro, Thanksgiving's Working Ways/Keroro, Fight! WakiRanger"; Transliteration: "Keroro Kinrō o Kansha seyo de Arimasu/Keroro Tatakae! Wakirenjā de Arimasu" (Japanese: ケロロ 勤労を感謝せよ であります/ケロロ 戦え！ワキレンジャー であります)	17 November 2007
Keroro runs away when the others reveal that they have no reason to be thankful for him. He runs into Joriri, who teaches him how to live a carefree lifestyle. The platoon are pestered by a Sentai-esque group of invaders known as the MinoRangers.
188	"Nuii, Don't Ever Leave Me!"; Transliteration: "Nuii Boku o Sutenai de! de Arimasu" (Japanese: ヌイイ ボクを捨てないで！ であります)	24 November 2007
Natsumi finds a doll in the trash that reminds her of a favorite childhood stuffed animal. She takes the doll home with her, unaware that the doll is actually a member of the Shurara Corps named Nuii. Meanwhile, another Shurara Corps member named Gyororo is turning Natsumi's friends into dolls.
189	"Dororo, The Assassin From the Past"; Transliteration: "Dororo Kako kara no Shikaku de Arimasu" (Japanese: ドロロ 過去からの刺客 であります)	8 December 2007
Dororo's former master, an assassin named Jirara, returns to cause trouble on Pekopon. Dororo is forced to confront his past in order to save his friends.
190	"Giroro, Target! The Present!/Keroro, The Big Birthday Party!"; Transliteration: "Giroro Mokuhyō! Purezento! de Arimasu/Keroro Tanjōbi Dai Pātī! de Arimasu" (Japanese: ギロロ 目標！プレゼント！ であります/ケロロ 誕生日大パーティー！ であります)	15 December 2007
Giroro tries to find a present for Natsumi's birthday. Giroro becomes desperate when he learns that Natsumi is going out to dinner with a friend for her birthday.
191	"Keroro, He and Lullaby Legend/Keroro, Plastic Model King, Very Big Charge!"; Transliteration: "Keroro Aitsu to Rarabai Densetsu de Arimasu/Keroro Puramo Ō Daikessen! de Arimasu" (Japanese: ケロロ あいつとララバイ伝説 であります/ケロロ プラモ王大決戦！ であります)	22 December 2007
Keroro gets a new vacuum cleaner and terrorizes the rest of the house with it. Keroro enters a plastic model building contest against the Superior Plastic Model Lord.
192	"Keroro, Prevent Christmas!/Keroro Platoon, A Cake Is a Man's Battlefield!"; Transliteration: "Keroro Kurisumasu o Bōshi seyo! de Arimasu/Keroro Shōtai Kēki wa Otoko no Senjō da! de Arimasu" (Japanese: ケロロ クリスマスを防止せよ！ であります/ケロロ小隊 ケーキは男の戦場だ！ であります)	29 December 2007
When he doesn't get the Gunpla models he wanted for Christmas, Keroro decides to ruin the holiday for everyone. But he soon learns that Santa Claus is not somebody to be messed with, especially when he turns out to be someone rather close to him. Everyone fights over who gets to eat the Christmas cake.
193	"Keroro, Hatsumōde Without Humility/Keroro, Sechira versus Zonira"; Transliteration: "Keroro Jingi naki Hatsumōde de Arimasu/Keroro Sechira tai Zonira de Arimasu" (Japanese: ケロロ 仁義なき初詣 であります/ケロロ セチラ対ゾニラ であります)	5 January 2008
The platoon visits a special shrine for New Year's Day. A giant robot that Keroro ordered to break his bad luck goes on a destructive rampage instead.
194	"Toilet, Now, We Strike!/Kululu and a Puppy"; Transliteration: "Toire Ima, tachiagaru Toki! de Arimasu/Kururu to Koinu de Arimasu" (Japanese: トイレ 今、立上がるとき！ であります/クルルと子犬 であります)	12 January 2008
Keroro puts a special device on each of the toilets in town which makes them aggressive. However, it backfires when the toilets start rebelling. Kururu brings home a puppy and starts showing an uncharacteristic caring side for it. Meanwhile, Giroro has mysteriously disappeared...
195	"Natsumi, I Said "I Want to Ski, Too"!/Keroro, Hot Spring, Tiring Tennis Match!"; Transliteration: "Natsumi Watashi mo Sukī ni Tsuretette! de Arimasu/Keroro Onsen ttsūtara Takkyū da! de Arimasu" (Japanese: 夏美 私もスキーに連れてって！ であります/ケロロ 温泉っつうたら卓球だ！ であります)	19 January 2008
Everyone spends a day at the ski slopes, where Natsumi is entered into a skiing contest so she can win a "Gunhed (film)" model for Keroro. At the hot springs, everyone gets involved with table-tennis.
196	"Keroro Special - Returned! Gero Gero 30 Minutes, 13 Stories"; Transliteration: "Kaettekita Gerogero Sanjū Bun de Arimasu" (Japanese: 帰ってきたゲロゲロ30分 であります)	26 January 2008
Another collection of various short stories.
197	"Zeroro, Multiplying?/Keroro, I Want to Dig Holes!"; Transliteration: "Zeroro Fuesugi? de Arimasu/Keroro Ana ga Attara Horitai! de Arimasu" (Japanese: ゼロロ 増えすぎ？ であります/ケロロ 穴があったら掘りたい！ であります)	2 February 2008
In an adventure from the platoon's childhood days, Dororo (then known as Zeroro) gets himself cloned numerous times. Keroro has been making large holes throughout the Hinata household. This is revealed to be the result of a space drill that appears on his forehead, which he then starts spreading to the others.
198	"Chibi Kero, Little-Little Big Adventure!/Natsumi and Momoka, Obligation Chocolate Excluded!"; Transliteration: "Chibi Kero Chibichibi Daibōken! de Arimasu/Natsumi & Momoka Giri Choko Kinshi! de Arimasu" (Japanese: ちびケロ チビチビ大冒険！ であります/夏美＆桃華 義理チョコ禁止！ であります)	9 February 2008
The Chibi Keroro Platoon are shrunk to the size of ants after eating an experimental candy that Kururu made. It's Valentine's Day, and Kururu gets himself in trouble when he uses a device to spy on everyone.
199	"Kululu, Kululun Idol Legend/Keroro, Resetting My Mind!"; Transliteration: "Kururu Kururun Aidoru Densetsu de Arimasu/Keroro Shoshin ni Kaeru! de Arimasu" (Japanese: クルル クルルンアイドル伝説 であります/ケロロ 初心に帰る！ であります)	16 February 2008
Kururu becomes extremely popular as a singing idol. Keroro decides to take the platoon back to their roots and start committing more horrific crimes.
200	"Keroro, Uru Has Come!"; Transliteration: "Keroro Urū ga Kuru! de Arimasu" (Japanese: ケロロ ウルーが来る！ であります)	23 February 2008
Keroro learns about the concept of leap years, and is terrified, because this means that an evil alien named Uru will come and destroy Pekopon.
201	"Giroro, the Third of March is Ear Day?/Keroro, It's Not A Woman's Fight"; Transliteration: "Giroro Sangetsu Mikka wa Mimi no Hi? de Arimasu/Keroro Ja nakute Onna no Tatakai de Arimasu" (Japanese: ギロロ ３月３日は耳の日？ であります/ケロロ じゃなくて女の戦い であります)	1 March 2008
Keroro's latest plan involves making everyone in Pekopon clean each other's ears. The girls fight over who gets to control a mystical orb known as the Toramon Ball.
202	"Keroro, Attack! The Last Worker"; Transliteration: "Keroro Gekitō! Saigo no Oshigotojin de Arimasu" (Japanese: ケロロ 激闘！最後のお仕事人 であります)	8 March 2008
After defeating Yukiki and Kagege, the last two members of the Shurara Corps, the platoon come face to face with Shurara himself.
203	"Keroro, Shurara, Final Brawl!"; Transliteration: "Keroro Shurara Saishū Kessen! de Arimasu" (Japanese: ケロロ シュララ最終決戦！ であります)	15 March 2008
The final battle with Shurara takes place, and Keroro learns who his formidable nemesis really is.
204	"Robo Kogoro/Keroro and Natsumi, Shelter From The Rain"; Transliteration: "Robo Kogorō de Arimasu/Keroro & Natsumi Amayadori de Arimasu" (Japanese: ロボ ５５６ であります/ケロロ＆夏美 雨宿り であります)	22 March 2008
Kogoro is turned into a robot. Keroro and Natsumi are stuck outside during a rainstorm.
205	"Keroro and Fuyuki, Another World"; Transliteration: "Keroro & Fuyuki Mō Hitotsu no Sekai de Arimasu" (Japanese: ケロロ＆冬樹 もうひとつの世界 であります)	29 March 2008
Keroro takes an underground train and ends up in an alternate reality where he never met Fuyuki.
