= Sgt. Frog season 3 =

Season of television series

Sgt. Frog
- Season 3
- Cover of the first DVD volume released by Bandai Visual featuring Fuyuki Hinata and Sergeant Keroro
- No. of episodes: 51

Release
- Original network: TV Tokyo
- Original release: April 7, 2006 – March 30, 2007

Season chronology
- ← Previous; Season 2 Next → Season 4

The third season of the Sgt. Frog anime series consists of the fifty-one episodes after episode one-hundred-and-three from the series, which first aired in Japan from April 7, 2006, to March 30, 2007, on TV Tokyo.

== Episode list ==
| No. | Title | Original release date |
|---|---|---|
| 104 | "Keroro Farewell, My Dear Keroro!"; Transliteration: "Keroro Saraba Itoshiki Keroro! de Arimasu" (Japanese: ケロロ さらば愛しきケロロ！ であります) | April 7, 2006 |
| 104 | "Keroro Countdown To Ruin"; Transliteration: "Keroro Metsubō e no Kauntodaun de Arimasu" (Japanese: ケロロ 滅亡へのカウントダウン であります) | April 7, 2006 |
Fuyuki's dream of Keroro successfully invading seems to come true as the platoon begin to act with uncharacteristic determination. However, it is eventually revealed that these are actually robotic doubles of the platoon. The platoon send an army of moving drawers to pummel the toes of Pekoponians into submission, leaving them open to invasion.
| 105 | "Keroro The Monumental Depths Of a Smile Sale!"; Transliteration: "Keroro Shinsō Kaiten Sumairu Sēru! de Arimasu" (Japanese: ケロロ 新装開店スマイルセール！ であります) | April 14, 2006 |
| 105 | "Momoka, The Grand Cherry Blossom Viewing Love-Love Strategy!"; Transliteration: "Momoka Ohanami de Raburabu Dairansen! de Arimasu" (Japanese: 桃華 お花見でラブラブ大乱戦！ であります) | April 14, 2006 |
The Keroro platoon opens a hamburger store. Everyone makes hamburgers of their own style, with Tamama putting a lot of sweet potato dangos in his burger, and Giroro putting gross ingredients in it, saying "If you can't even eat this, how will you survive on the battlefield?". Fuyuki and Natsumi help them too, Natsumi helps Mois with strangely selling "smiles" that give you motivation, and Fuyuki helps with burgers. However, Keroro orders new ingredients and has to pay a very huge amount of money for them. After doing that, they finally find out none of the burgers have been sold, but only the smiles have been selling, so the plan fails. Momoka orders her squad to find a magical Cherry Blossom tree, and invites Fuyuki to come watch them. It is said that two persons standing under the tree will fall in love, which turns out to be true when Keroro and Tamama, as well as Mois and Giroro, fall in love with each other while standing there. However, there may be more to the tree than it seems...
| 106 | "Fuyuki And Natsumi Convenient Invaders"; Transliteration: "Fuyuki And Natsumi Katte ni Shinnyūsha de Arimasu" (Japanese: 冬樹&夏美 勝手に侵入者 であります) | April 21, 2006 |
| 106 | "Giroro, A Time For Hobbies"; Transliteration: "Giroro Shumi no Jikan de Arimasu" (Japanese: ギロロ 趣味の時間 であります) | April 21, 2006 |
Fuyuki and Natsumi see Keroro sneaking around on the streets. When they think he's planning something suspicious, they follow him to a dead end. Fuyuki opens a closet, and falls into a hole along with Natsumi, leading to a secret place called Alien Street. However, humans are not allowed there, so they disguise themselves as aliens, and explore the city. The Keroro platoon make a test from the Keron Army, asking for their hobbies, interests, etc. When Natsumi sees Giroro doesn't have any interests, Keroro tricks him, saying Natsumi will always find him a boring man if he doesn't get a hobby, just so Keroro won't have to worry about the invasion anymore. Giroro goes to everyone to ask what their hobbies are, but they're total crap. When Natsumi hears of Giroro trying to get a hobby, she teaches him that a hobby is what interests you the most. When Giroro hears that, he realizes what interests him the most and what he really wants to do...Conquer Pekopon!
| 107 | "Natsumi The Dreaded Health Inspection"; Transliteration: "Natsumi Kyōfu no Karada Kensa de Arimasu" (Japanese: 夏美 恐怖の身体検査 であります) | April 28, 2006 |
| 107 | "Fuyuki And Natsumi The Grand Sibling War!"; Transliteration: "Fuyuki Ando Natsumi Kyōdai Daisensō! de Arimasu" (Japanese: 冬樹&夏美 姉弟大戦争！ であります) | April 28, 2006 |
Keroro finds out Natsumi and Fuyuki have a health inspection on their school. Knowing this, the platoon invades the Health Inspection and punish the students in many ways. When Natsumi finds out, the platoon runs for it, but later gets caught by Dororo in a trap. Dororo reminds Keroro of him abusing Dororo in the Keron Army health inspection, and almost makes them suffocate, when Natsumi arrives and is about to attack. Keroro calls Dororo "most popular and loved dororo heichou", with Dororo getting all happy, not realizing he has been tricked. The platoon runs for it, with Natsumi chasing them. They get chased into the boy's changing room, where Natsumi can't go. Fuyuki accidentally gets knocked out of the door, and is seen in his underwear by all the girls on the school. Fuyuki is still mad at Natsumi for what happened that day. Keroro realizes that if they get in a fight, Keroro might get all the blame. So he adds oil to the fire that he caused, and hosts a "sibling fight" between Natsumi and Fuyuki. At the end, when Natsumi wins, their find kind of ends, when they find out Fuyuki wasn't mad about the health examination accident, but that Natsumi threw away an occult magazine he left in the hallway. With Keroro realizing and telling it was actually him telling Giroro it was okay to burn it, they get tied to pieces of wood on a campfire and get punished.
| 108 | "Tamama Monopoly! A Time For Adults"; Transliteration: "Tamama Dokusen! Otona no Jikan" (Japanese: タママ 独占！オトナの時間 であります) | May 5, 2006 |
| 108 | "Fuyuki And Momoka The Island Of Doctor Kululu"; Transliteration: "Fuyuki Ando Momoka Dokutā Kururu no Shima de Arimasu" (Japanese: 冬樹&桃華 ドクタークルルの島 であります) | May 5, 2006 |
Tamama wakes up, seeing his tail is gone. Not knowing what this means, he asks the other members of the platoon, and they explain he has become an adult. When Kururu mentions that he's now ready to "Drink, hit, and buy", Tamama explores the adult part of Alien Street to find out what this means. In the end, it seems that while he was asleep, the "If you can live life over again gun" fell out of a closet and fired at Tamama, making him an adult. Fuyuki, Momoka, and the platoon get stranded on a deserted island. They find the platoon sitting in killer machines, and they attack. They're no match for Momoka's second personality though, and later, when Momoka has called the rescue squad, they find out that it was Kururu's island. He found the platoon knocked out, and used them as guinea pigs for his fighting machines.
| 109 | "Keroro Mama's Grand Rejuvenation"; Transliteration: "Keroro Mama-dono Iyashikei Daisakusen de Arimasu" (Japanese: ケロロ ママ殿癒し系大作戦 であります) | May 12, 2006 |
| 109 | "Dororo Silently Running Wild On the Galaxy Express"; Transliteration: "Dororo Chinmoku no Bōsō Ginga Tokkyū de Arimasu" (Japanese: ドロロ 沈黙の暴走銀河特急 であります) | May 12, 2006 |
Keroro perfects his shoulder massaging technique in order to gain Aki's appreciation and pay. The Keroro Platoon try to stop a Galaxy Express 999 which Dororo's mother is on.
| 110 | "Keroro Quite Possibly the Best Medicine Ever"; Transliteration: "Keroro Sukoshi Fushigi na Tokkōyaku de Arimasu" (Japanese: ケロロ すこしふしぎな特効薬 であります) | May 19, 2006 |
| 110 | "Keroro All Paths Lead To Starfruit!"; Transliteration: "Keroro Subete no Michi wa Sutāfurūtsu e Tsuzuku! de Arimasu" (Japanese: ケロロ すべての道はスターフルーツへ続く！ であります) | May 19, 2006 |
Keroro falls gravely ill with a mysterious illness. After being cured, Keroro plans to turn everything on Pekopon into his new favorite food, starfruit.
| 111 | "Koyuki A Shinobi Pajama Party"; Transliteration: "Koyuki Shinobiryū Pajama Pātī de Arimasu" (Japanese: 小雪 忍流パジャマパーティー であります) | May 26, 2006 |
| 111 | "Natsumi The Shocking Teacher's Visit!"; Transliteration: "Natsumi Dokkiri Katei Hōmon! de Arimasu" (Japanese: 夏美 ドッキリ家庭訪問！ であります) | May 26, 2006 |
Koyuki has an eventful sleepover with Natsumi. Giroro tries to sabotage it, but Dororo is also keeping an eye on them. When the platoon discover that Natsumi's mom can't come and talk to the teacher about her daughter's education, they try and take her place.
| 112 | "Kululu & Saburo The Artist's Decisive Encounter!"; Transliteration: "Kururu & Saburō Deai wa Oekaki Gachinko Shōbu! de Arimasu" (Japanese: クルル&サブロー 出会いはお絵かきガチンコ勝負!であります) | June 2, 2006 |
Keroro wants to use one of two reality pens, a pen that makes drawn things real, for the invasion. But Kururu can't remember where he put one and Saburo is the only one who can use the other! Keroro dives into his memories and ends up in the place where Kururu first met Saburo. As the platoon search for the pen, the mystery of how Kururu and Saburo met is unravelled.
| 113 | "Keroro Battling Our Wettol King"; Transliteration: "Keroro Tatakae Bokura no Wettoru Kingu de Arimasu" (Japanese: ケロロ 戦え僕らのウェットルキング であります) | June 9, 2006 |
| 113 | "Natsumi The Return of Wettol King"; Transliteration: "Natsumi Kaettekita Wettoru Kingu de Arimasu" (Japanese: 夏美 帰ってきたウェットルキング であります) | June 9, 2006 |
Keroro learns of Natsumi's fear of slugs, and turns a slug into the action hero Wettol King to fight her. Keroro calls on Wettol King to once again fight Natsumi, but Wettol King hesitates as he begins to gain a true hero's heart.
| 114 | "Giroro My Way Of Getting Revenge!"; Transliteration: "Giroro Adauchisuru wa Ware ni Ari! de Arimasu" (Japanese: ギロロ あだ討ちするはわれにあり！ であります) | June 16, 2006 |
| 114 | "Keroro Dasonu Maso Again and Again and Again?"; Transliteration: "Keroro Matamatamata Dasonu Maso? de Arimasu" (Japanese: ケロロ またまたまたダソヌ☆マソ？ であります) | June 16, 2006 |
A pair of alien kids arrive on Earth seeking revenge for their father. Giroro trains the brother while Keroro, Tamama and Mois search for the kids' target. Dasonu Maso's sister, Dasonu Marie, comes to observe the comedic antics of the Keroro Platoon.
| 115 | "Keroro Nyororo vs. Mecha Nyororo"; Transliteration: "Keroro Nyororo tai Mekanyororo de Arimasu" (Japanese: ケロロ ニョロロ対メカニョロロ であります) | June 23, 2006 |
| 115 | "Keroro Gone with the Nyobo"; Transliteration: "Keroro Nyobo totomoni Sarinu de Arimasu" (Japanese: ケロロ ニョボと共に去りぬ であります) | June 23, 2006 |
Keroro directs a movie wherein he battles Nyororo using a robotic counterpart. Keroro turns the robotic Nyororo into a pet, and quickly bonds with it.
| 116 | "Keroro Aiming For That Shining Flow!"; Transliteration: "Keroro Pikafuro o Nerae! de Arimasu" (Japanese: ケロロ ピカフロをねらえ！ であります) | June 30, 2006 |
| 116 | "Mois A Diary About Uncle"; Transliteration: "Moa Ojisama Nikki de Arimasu" (Japanese: モア おじさま日記 であります) | June 30, 2006 |
Keroro battles Natsumi for right to take a comfortable bath. The platoon take a look through Mois' diary to reflect on their past endeavors.
| 117 | "Keroro Wishes On Tanabata"; Transliteration: "Keroro Tanabata ni Negai o! de Arimasu" (Japanese: ケロロ 七夕に願いを！ であります) | July 7, 2006 |
| 117 | "Keroro Revival! The Extraordinarily Talented Dopamine"; Transliteration: "Keroro Fukkatsu! Kaiketsu Dōpamin de Arimasu" (Japanese: ケロロ 復活！怪傑ドーパミン であります) | July 7, 2006 |
The platoon snoops through the Tanabata wishes of the town. Keroro takes to the airwaves again to make the Pekopon Shinryaku Ondo a hit song.
| 118 | "Ghost Girl Let's Go To School"; Transliteration: "Yūrei-chan Gakkō e Yukou de Arimasu" (Japanese: 幽霊ちゃん 学校へ行こう であります) | July 14, 2006 |
| 118 | "Kululu The Sergeant Major Of Curry"; Transliteration: "Kururu Karē no Sōchōsama de Arimasu" (Japanese: クルル カレーの曹長さま であります) | July 14, 2006 |
The platoon decide to go haunting at Natsumi and Fuyuki's school for a new invasion plan, and the ghost comes too. But when she passes through a girl called Satsuki, she takes control of her body. She doesn't know what to do, and to make it worse, there's an important swimming competition! The platoon open a curry shop. The Hinatas don't think their curry is very good, but the curry is very popular, to their surprise. They discover that Kururu added something to the curry; but what?
| 119 | "Giroro How Grand! Summer Training Camp"; Transliteration: "Giroro Sōzetsu! Natsu Gasshuku de Arimasu" (Japanese: ギロロ 壮絶！ 夏合宿 であります) | July 21, 2006 |
| 119 | "Keroro Capturing a Late Saturday Night's Shine!"; Transliteration: "Keroro Doyō no Ushinohi o Tsukamaero! de Arimasu" (Japanese: ケロロ 土曜の丑の日をつかまえろ！ であります) | July 21, 2006 |
Giroro trains the platoon in the mountains, while Natsumi and Koyuki enjoy a school trip to the lake. Keroro seeks to obtain all the eel in Japan, hoping to leave Natsumi without a refreshing summer snack.
| 120 | "Keroro Doinaka Coast Returns"; Transliteration: "Keroro Doinaka Kaigan Ritānzu de Arimasu" (Japanese: ケロロ 土井中海岸リターンズ であります) | July 28, 2006 |
| 120 | "Momoka One Summer Experience"; Transliteration: "Momoka Hito Natsu no Keiken de Arimasu" (Japanese: 桃華 ひと夏の経験 であります) | July 28, 2006 |
Keroro and Fuyuki compete in a swimsuit contest/eating contest/swimming race/footrace. Momoka gets aged up with an accidental blast from the "If I Could Do My Life Over" Gun, and ends up having an annoying and trendy alien fall for her.
| 121 | "Dororo Lady Ninja Karara Appears!"; Transliteration: "Dororo Kunoichi Karara Shushutto Sanjō! de Arimasu" (Japanese: ドロロ くの一カララ シュシュッと参上！ であります) | August 4, 2006 |
After changing her boyfriend from Kururu to Dororo, Karara comes back with her friend Chiroro to show off her new ninja skills to Dororo. But when Dororo turns out to be Viper in disguise, the platoon discover that they are in terrible danger!
| 122 | "Kululu The Cursed DVD"; Transliteration: "Kururu Noroi no DVD de Arimasu" (Japanese: クルル 呪いのDVD であります) | August 11, 2006 |
| 122 | "Natsumi By All Means, What is This Prohibition!"; Transliteration: "Natsumi Nani ga Nan demo Kinshi yo! de Arimasu" (Japanese: 夏美 何がなんでも禁止よ！ であります) | August 11, 2006 |
A bored Keroro goes around looking for DVDs to watch. He comes across a DVD in Kururu's lab that has warning signs on it, and when he plays it, it summons a Tiger Horse that appears in the hallway. What's strange, however, is that it can only be seen from inside Keroro's room. Natsumi is feeling grumpy due to the heat, so she disallows all sorts of things. Wanting to keep her from banning Gunpla, Keroro helps her out by creating some special robots that punish rule-breakers for her. However, the robots go out of control when they are told to eliminate all weapons from the house.
| 123 | "Visiting Grandma Hinata's House"; Transliteration: "Hinataka Satogaeri de Arimasu" (Japanese: 日向家 里帰り であります) | August 18, 2006 |
| 123 | "Tamama and the Turtle"; Transliteration: "Tamama to Kame de Arimasu" (Japanese: タママとカメ であります) | August 18, 2006 |
While visiting Grandma Hinata's house, the platoon find an alien that can shapeshift into anyone's worst fears. Tamama ponders a turtle going slowly down a country road he encounters during his training.
| 124 | "Keroro The Summer's Treasure"; Transliteration: "Keroro Natsu no Takaramono de Arimasu" (Japanese: ケロロ 夏の宝物 であります) | August 25, 2006 |
Keroro, Giroro, and Dororo remember their adventure as kids to find a Viper pirate's lost treasure on a far-off planet.
| 125 | "Keroro Morally Spinning Sushi!"; Transliteration: "Keroro Jinginaki Kaiten Sushi! de Arimasu" (Japanese: ケロロ 仁義なき回転寿司！ であります) | September 1, 2006 |
| 125 | "Keroro The Dreaded Mosquito"; Transliteration: "Keroro Kyōfu no Za Mosukīto de Arimasu" (Japanese: ケロロ 恐怖のザ・モスキート であります) | September 1, 2006 |
Keroro ruthlessly tries making the most of his meal at a conveyor-belt sushi place. A matter transporter incident causes Keroro's DNA to get mixed up with a mosquito's.
| 126 | "Keroro And Natsumi Which Way to Heroes?!"; Transliteration: "Keroro Ando Natsumi Yūsha wa Dotchi da?! de Arimasu" (Japanese: ケロロ&夏美 勇者はどっちだ？！ であります) | September 8, 2006 |
Kururu invites Keroro and friends to get zapped into his new RPG, but some bugs in the game's code lead to some unexpected side-effects.
| 127 | "Keroro Secret Moon Vacation"; Transliteration: "Keroro Kossori Tsuki Ryokō de Arimasu" (Japanese: ケロロ こっそり月旅行 であります) | September 15, 2006 |
| 127 | "Giroro Typhoon Invasion Operation Commences!"; Transliteration: "Giroro Taifū Shinryaku Sakusen Kekkō! de Arimasu" (Japanese: ギロロ 台風侵略作戦決行！ であります) | September 15, 2006 |
Keroro takes Fuyuki and Natsumi on a trip to the moon, while also hoping to quietly ditch his invasion deadline countdown. Giroro gets faced with a moral dilemma when a typhoon gives him a prime opportunity to conquer Pekopon.
| 128 | "Keroro Finally Prays to God?"; Transliteration: "Keroro Saigo wa Honki de Kamidanomi? de Arimasu" (Japanese: ケロロ 最後は本気で神頼み？ であります) | September 22, 2006 |
Keroro eventually gives up hope on the coundown timer counting down the days left to invade Pekopon. He prays to God, but also finds a red rock shaped like Giroro. Keroro advertises it as a new god and it becomes popular. All is going well, and for once the platoon have a hope that they might succeed in getting money for invasion.
| 129 | "Kiruru. The Messenger of Destruction"; Transliteration: "Kiruru Hametsu no Shisha de Arimasu" (Japanese: キルル 破滅の使者 であります) | September 29, 2006 |
The countdown timer is eventually up! It transforms into Kiruru. (Kiruru dot) who uses people's indecisiveness as energy for invasion by marking triangles on them. But the platoon discover that he is a faulty product, and Headquarters demand it back. But Keroro has become attached to the countdown timer, who he calls Mashiu. He doesn't want to give Kiruru. back. Nobody knows what to do.
| 130 | "Keroro Platoon All Members Reboot!"; Transliteration: "Keroro Shōtai Zen'in Saikidō! de Arimasu" (Japanese: ケロロ小隊 全員再起動！ であります) | October 6, 2006 |
| 130 | "Garuru Platoon Everyone Fight!"; Transliteration: "Garuru Shōtai Kakusen Eri de Arimasu" (Japanese: ガルル小隊 かく戦えり であります) | October 6, 2006 |
The platoon once again let their copy robots take care of the house while they plan for fun activities, but things spiral out of hand. The Garuru Platoon fight the Keroro Platoon's copy robots thinking they're the real deal.
| 131 | "Giroro A Secret Day Off"; Transliteration: "Giroro Himitsu no Kyūjitsu" (Japanese: ギロロ 秘密の休日 であります) | October 13, 2006 |
| 131 | "Baio Conquer the Sports Festival"; Transliteration: "Baio Undōkai o Shihai seyo de Arimasu" (Japanese: 梅雄 運動会を支配せよ であります) | October 13, 2006 |
The group follows Giroro to his secret vacation spot: a sweet potato field. The Keroro Platoon and Baio fight for control of the weather to determine the fate of Momoka's sports festival.
| 132 | "Dororo The Chance is Important!"; Transliteration: "Dororo Kikkake ga Daiji! de Arimasu" (Japanese: ドロロ キッカケが大事！ であります) | October 20, 2006 |
| 132 | "Natsumi My Bluebird"; Transliteration: "Natsumi Watashi no Aoi Tori de Arimasu" (Japanese: 夏美 私の青い鳥 であります) | October 20, 2006 |
An unsure assassin-in-training has trouble finding the nerve to challenge Dororo. Natsumi takes in a bluebird and struggles to keep it safe.
| 133 | "Alisa Hunter of Darkness, Halloween in Chaos!"; Transliteration: "Arisa Yami no Karyūdo Harowin Daisōdō! de Arimasu" (Japanese: アリサ 闇の狩人 ハロウィン大騒動！ であります) | October 27, 2006 |
Fuyuki has a dream about a girl who hunts unknown beings like aliens. She is, in fact, a real person, and she has her eye on the Keroro platoon. Her name is Alisa Southerncross, and she kidnaps Fuyuki, because he has the power to attract the creatures.
| 134 | "Keroro If You Catch a Cold, It'll be Fixed in Post!?"; Transliteration: "Keroro Kaze o Hiitara Afureko da!? de Arimasu" (Japanese: ケロロ 風邪をひいたらアフレコだ！？ であります) | November 3, 2006 |
| 134 | "Fuyuki & Kururu Go to Akihabara"; Transliteration: "Fuyuki & Kururu Akihabara o Yuku de Arimasu" (Japanese: 冬樹&クルル 秋葉原を行く であります) | November 3, 2006 |
Keroro loses his voice, and his friends go overboard trying to dub in his dialogue. Kururu encounters an old foe while shopping for computer parts with Fuyuki.
| 135 | "Karara And Chiroro The Shichi-Go-San of Nagomi"; Transliteration: "Karara Ando Chiroro Shichigosan ni Nagomi-san! de Arimasu" (Japanese: カララ&チロロ 七五三に753さん！ であります) | November 10, 2006 |
| 135 | "Keroro It's Only One Grain Left"; Transliteration: "Keroro Taka ga Hitotsubu Saredo Hitosubu de Arimasu" (Japanese: ケロロ たかが1粒されど1粒 であります) | November 10, 2006 |
A god from Keron comes and chases Karara and Chiroro to Pekopon. He is angry, and the Keroro platoon try and calm him down, but their efforts make it worse. And he has been known to destroy planets in his angriness. Dororo gets angry at Keroro for leaving rice in his bowl. He and Kururu team up to teach Keroro a lesson, and he experiences a rice grain's feelings about being uneaten after trying so hard to grow up into healthy rice.
| 136 | "Aki War at the Onsen!"; Transliteration: "Aki Onsen de Daikassen! de Arimasu" (Japanese: 秋 温泉で大合戦！ であります) | November 17, 2006 |
| 136 | "Keroro Go! Keroropan"; Transliteration: "Keroro Soreike! Keroropan de Arimasu" (Japanese: ケロロ それいけ！ケロロパン であります) | November 17, 2006 |
Aki is at a hot spring when she is accosted by monkeys. Since she is afraid of animals, Keroro and the others try to get rid of them. Keroro and his friends create giant bread replicas of themselves.
| 137 | "Keroro It's a Field Trip Until You Say I'm Home!"; Transliteration: "Keroro Tadaima! Toiu Made ga Ensoku da! de Arimasu" (Japanese: ケロロ ただいま！と言うまでが遠足だ！ であります) | November 24, 2006 |
| 137 | "Keroro Sukiyaki of Love and Sorrow"; Transliteration: "Keroro Ai to Kanashimi no Sukiyaki de Arimasu" (Japanese: ケロロ 愛と悲しみのスキヤキ であります) | November 24, 2006 |
A Bratterling wants the platoon to help sell tickets for his recital, but the platoon want nothing to do with Keroro after he bought Gunpla instead of meat. So, Keroro has to sell all of the tickets by himself, while everyone else has a picnic. Everyone goes nuts when Keroro forgets to ask for shiritaki noodles.
| 138 | "Keroro Keroro Show"; Transliteration: "Keroro Keroro Shō de Arimasu" (Japanese: ケロロ ケロロショー であります) | December 8, 2006 |
| 138 | "Fuyuki & Chiruyo KGS Returns"; Transliteration: "Fuyuki & Chiruyo KGS Futatabi de Arimasu" (Japanese: 冬樹&散世 KGS再び であります) | December 8, 2006 |
The platoon tries to create their own character stage show. The Newspaper Club tries to uncover the platoon's secrets once again.
| 139 | "Kogoro Central Tokyo is a Man's Battlefield"; Transliteration: "Kogorō Oku Tōkyō-shi wa Otoko no Senjō de Arimasu" (Japanese: 556 奥東京市は男の戦場 であります) | December 15, 2006 |
Kogoro gets a space cold and ends up infecting Natsumi and Aki with his "556 Virus". Kururu learns that he has been infected with the "Boss Virus", which will set up base inside anyone's body and whoever gets infected afterwards will become like that person. The only way to get rid of the virus is to destroy their base inside of the original target's body. Keroro, Giroro, Tamama and Fuyuki shrink themselves and enter Kogoro's body in order to fight the virus.
| 140 | "Keroro Platoon Super Battle Operation: Tax Return"; Transliteration: "Keroro Shōtai Nenmatsu Chōsei Daisakusen de Arimasu" (Japanese: ケロロ小隊 年末調整大作戦 であります) | December 22, 2006 |
| 140 | "Keroro A Certain Man's Fight"; Transliteration: "Keroro Aru Otoko no Tatakai" (Japanese: ケロロ ある男の戦い であります) | December 22, 2006 |
Keroro demands that everyone create a lavish dinner for him, while keeping under their budget. Keroro has trouble organizing all of his Gunpla figures.
| 141 | "Keroro Central Tokyo's Ice Age Alisa Has Come"; Transliteration: "Keroro Oku Tōkyō Hyōgaki Arisa ga Kita! de Arimasu" (Japanese: ケロロ 奥東京氷河期 アリサが来た！ であります) | December 29, 2006 |
Tokyo experiences a very cold Christmas, and it turns out that there is one creature behind all this. Alisa returns to fight the creature and return Tokyo to normal - and also have her dinner.
| 142 | "Keroro Give Me Back My New Year"; Transliteration: "Keroro Oshōgatsu o Kaeshite! de Arimasu" (Japanese: ケロロ お正月を返して！ であります) | January 5, 2007 |
| 142 | "Giroro Let's Get Working on the Pekopon Invasion!"; Transliteration: "Giroro Shigoto Hajime wa Pekopon Shinryaku! de Arimasu" (Japanese: ギロロ 仕事初めはペコポン侵略！ であります) | January 5, 2007 |
Keroro oversleeps and misses the first few days of the new year. When Keroro gets worked up about his next invasion plan, Giroro is the only who doesn't support it.
| 143 | "Keroro Miracle?! Keroro's Father."; Transliteration: "Keroro Kiseki!? Keroro no Chichi de Arimasu" (Japanese: ケロロ 奇跡！？ケロロの父 であります) | January 12, 2007 |
| 143 | "Hinata House Submerged!?"; Transliteration: "Hinataka Chinbotsu!? de Arimasu" (Japanese: 日向家 沈没！？ であります) | January 12, 2007 |
While waiting for Keroro's father to show up for a visit, Viper arrives and turns the platoon into bronze statues. While trying to recreate a Gundam episode, Keroro accidentally starts sinking the house.
| 144 | "Keroro A Bold-Faced Fake Fairytale The Ear's Conundrum"; Transliteration: "Keroro Tetsu Kamen Densetsu Nazo no Dekamimi de Arimasu" (Japanese: ケロロ 鉄仮面伝説 謎のデカ耳 であります) | January 19, 2007 |
Three new transfer students show up in Natsumi's class with animal ears. She is then approached by the space police to help them find a criminal with big ears. Naturally, she assumes that it's one of the new transfer students, but is it really?
| 145 | "Urere the Salesman Invader"; Transliteration: "Urere Urekko Shinryakusha de Arimasu" (Japanese: ウレレ 売れっ子侵略者 であります) | January 26, 2007 |
| 145 | "Keroro And Then Nonetheless There Were None"; Transliteration: "Keroro Soshite Yappari Dare mo Inakunatta de Arimasu" (Japanese: ケロロ そしてやっぱり誰もいなくなった であります) | January 26, 2007 |
Urere, a Keronian salesman, comes to Pekopon to help the Keroro Platoon with their invasion plans. He comes up with one which is so impressive that Keroro tries to steal it for himself. The platoon are stuck inside of an old house, where, one by one, they gradually start disappearing.
| 146 | "Pluto, do you remember it?" Transliteration: "Mei Oboete Imasu ka? de Arimasu" (Japanese: 冥 おぼえていますか？ であります) | February 2, 2007 |
After Pluto had officially been declared not a planet, a mysterious girl called Mei arrives. It turns out that she is from Pluto, and she is trying to make people remember that it is still there.
| 147 | "Paul A Butler's Honor"; Transliteration: "Pōru Shitsuji no Ichibun de Arimasu" (Japanese: ポール 執事の一分 であります) | February 9, 2007 |
| 147 | "Giroro who gave me this?" Transliteration: "Giroro Kureta no wa Dare? de Arimasu" (Japanese: ギロロ くれたのは誰？ であります) | February 9, 2007 |
Paul the butler wants to resign, and holds auditions to see who will become his successor. Giroro is determined to find out who sent him a box of chocolates.
| 148 | "Koyuki Jidaigeki Wonderland!"; Transliteration: "Koyuki Jidaigeki Wandārando! de Arimasu" (Japanese: 小雪 時代劇ワンダーランド！ であります) | February 16, 2007 |
| 148 | "Keroro jumps to Chubei!"; Transliteration: "Keroro Chūbeesama ni Tobitsukou! de Arimasu" (Japanese: ケロロ チュー兵衛様に飛びつこう！ であります) | February 16, 2007 |
Koyuki takes Natsumi and Giroro to a jidaigeki-themed park. Meanwhile, behind the scenes, Keroro and Tamama plan to sabotage things out of revenge for not being invited. Keroro and the others return to the park to investigate a mysterious energy reading.
| 149 | "Alisa Alien Versus Monster"; Transliteration: "Arisa Eirian tai Monsutā de Arimasu" (Japanese: アリサ エイリアン対モンスター であります) | February 23, 2007 |
The platoon must save Alisa when she is kidnapped by aliens.
| 150 | "Giroro An Established Time to Journey"; Transliteration: "Giroro Tabidachi no Toki de Arimasu" (Japanese: ギロロ 旅立ちのとき であります) | March 2, 2007 |
Giroro is reassigned to another platoon and has to leave Earth forever. Natsumi feels upset after yelling at him earlier, and tries to make it back home before he leaves.
| 151 | "Chiruyo Checking up on White Day"; Transliteration: "Chiruyo Howaitodē o Chekku! de Arimasu" (Japanese: 散世 ホワイトデーをチェック！ であります) | March 9, 2007 |
| 151 | "Fuyuki I Know How to Use The Application"; Transliteration: "Fuyuki Goriyō wa Keikakuteki ni de Arimasu" (Japanese: 冬樹 ご利用は計画的に であります) | March 9, 2007 |
On White Day, Chiruyo monitors the platoon members. After fooling around with the Kero Ball, Fuyuki ends up in a simulated battle with a giant monster.
| 152 | "Keroro Frequent Appearance! Planet Andou's Heaven"; Transliteration: "Keroro Shutsubotsu! Adosei kku Tengoku de Arimasu" (Japanese: ケロロ 出没！アド星ック天国 であります) | March 16, 2007 |
Keroro helps to produce a TV program that shows off the various sights of Pekopon.
| 153 | "Kerokero Military Operation Number 100"; Transliteration: "Kerokero Sakusen Daihyakugō de Arimasu" (Japanese: ケロケロ作戦 第100号 であります) | March 23, 2007 |
Keroro's 100th invasion plan is ruined when evil tables start attacking Pekopon. Little do they know, however, that an even bigger threat is approaching...
| 154 | "Keroro Farewell Sergeant Keroro"; Transliteration: "Keroro Saraba Keroro Gunsō de Arimasu" (Japanese: ケロロ さらばケロロ軍曹 であります) | March 30, 2007 |
Keroro and his friends learn that Alien Town can transform into a giant robot. With help from the Garuru Platoon, they use it to stop the invasion once and for all.
